= 1945 Pacific typhoon season =

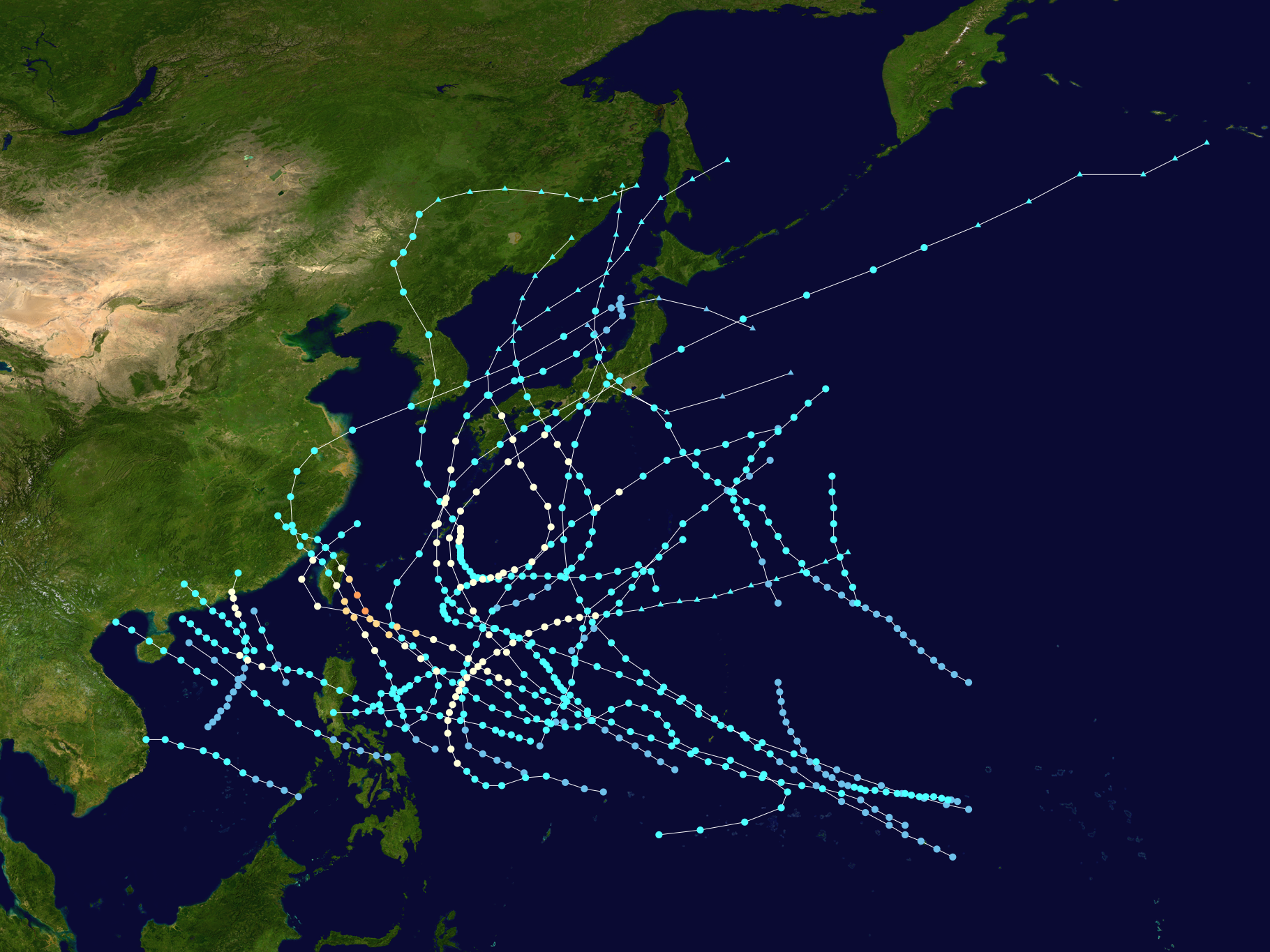
- Season summary map

Seasonal boundaries
- First system formed: April 19, 1945
- Last system dissipated: December 2, 1945

Strongest storm
- Name: Ida
  - Maximum winds: 130 km/h (80 mph) (1-minute sustained)
  - Lowest pressure: 917 hPa (mbar)

Seasonal statistics
- Total storms: 26
- Typhoons: 13
- Total fatalities: >3,798
- Total damage: Unknown

Related articles
- 1945 Atlantic hurricane season; 1942–1948 Pacific hurricane seasons; 1940s North Indian Ocean cyclone seasons

The 1945 Pacific typhoon season was the first official season to be included in the West Pacific typhoon database. It was also the first season to name storms. It has no official bounds; it ran year-round in 1945, but most tropical cyclones tend to form in the northwestern Pacific Ocean between June and December. These dates conventionally delimit the period of each year when most tropical cyclones form in the northwestern Pacific Ocean.

The scope of this article is limited to the Pacific Ocean, north of the equator and west of the International Date Line. Storms that form east of the date line and north of the equator are called hurricanes; see 1945 Pacific hurricane season. Predecessor agency to the Joint Typhoon Warning Center (JTWC), Fleet Weather Center/Typhoon Tracking Center was established on the island of Guam in June 1945, after multiple typhoons, including Typhoon Cobra in the previous season and Typhoon Connie in this season, had caused a significant loss of men and ships. It would not take major responsibility in the West Pacific basin until 1950 season. Instead, storms in this season are identified and named by the United States Armed Services, and these names are taken from the list that USAS publicly adopted before this season had started earlier this year. Since this is the first season to be included in the West Pacific typhoon database, this would also be the first season where the names of Western Pacific tropical cyclones are preserved publicly.

== Systems ==
=== Tropical Storm Ann ===
- Tropical storm (SSHWS)
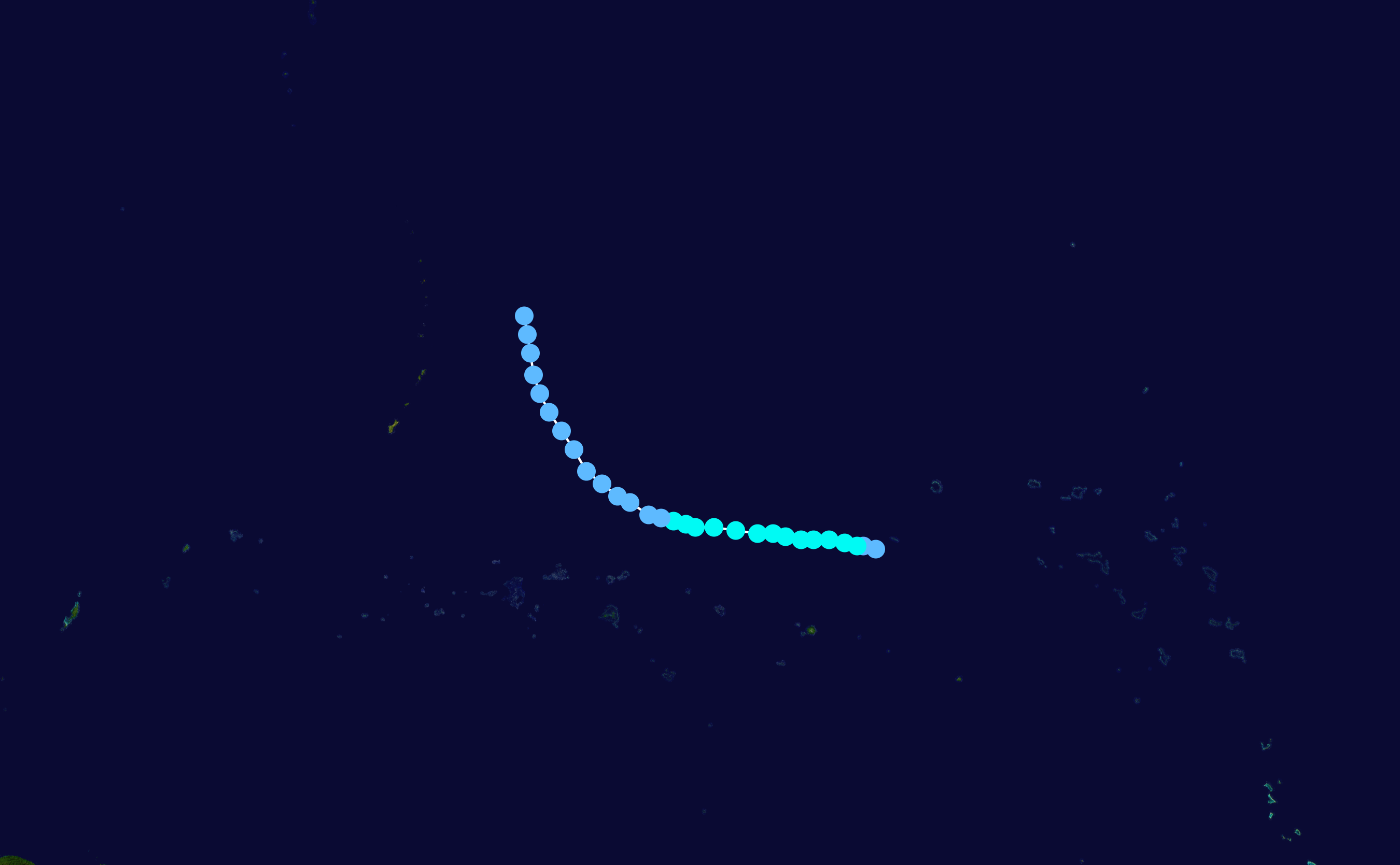
- Duration: April 19 – April 26
- Peak intensity: 95 km/h (60 mph) (1-min); 995 hPa (mbar)

The first named storm of the season, Tropical Storm Ann formed on April 19 at relatively low latitude of 9.5°N. Ann generally tracked westward and later reached its peak intensity on April 21, before weakening to a tropical depression on April 23. The storm began to curve north the next day, and overall did not affect any landmasses and dissipated on April 26.

=== Tropical Storm Betty ===
- Tropical storm (SSHWS)
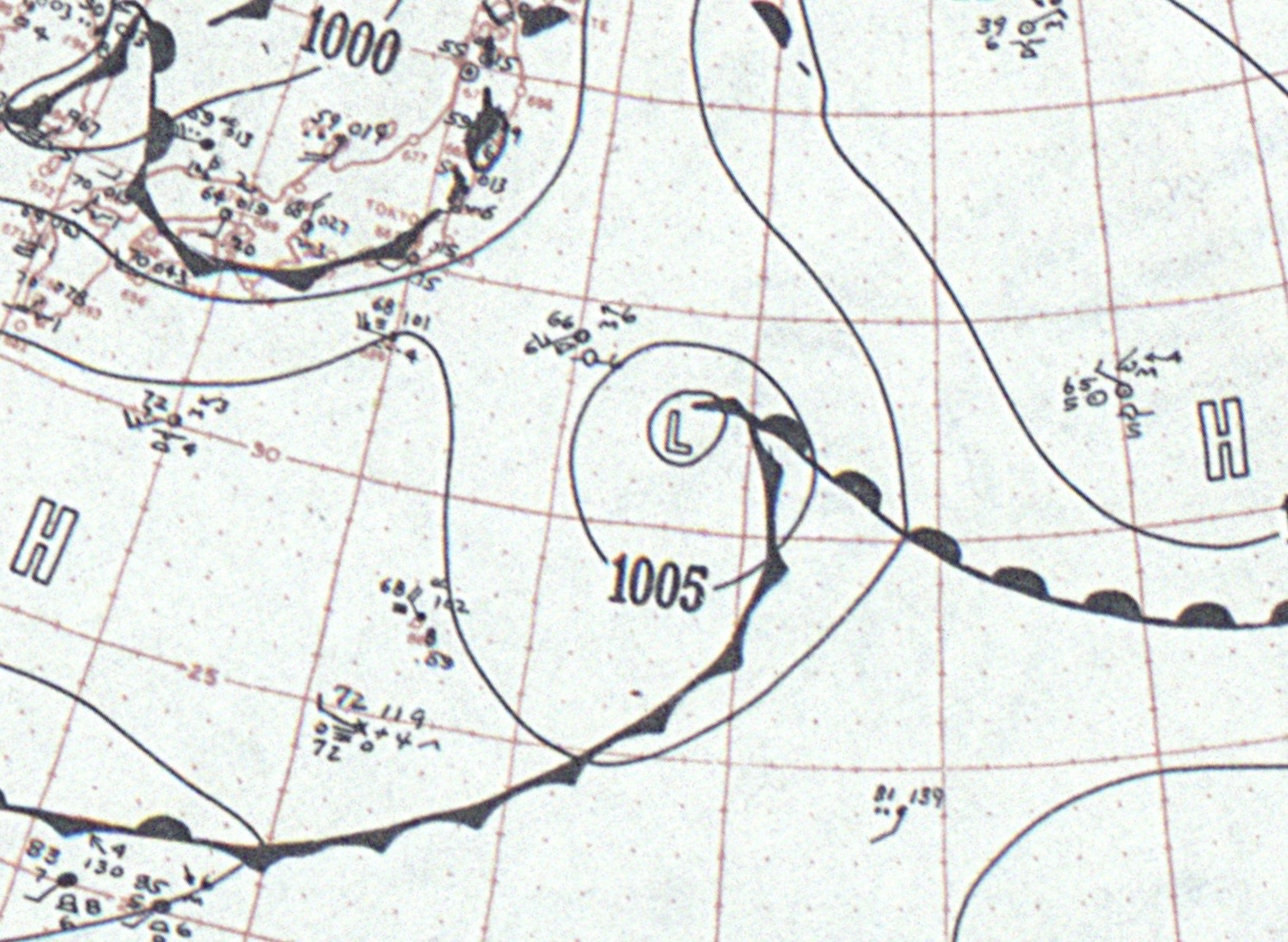
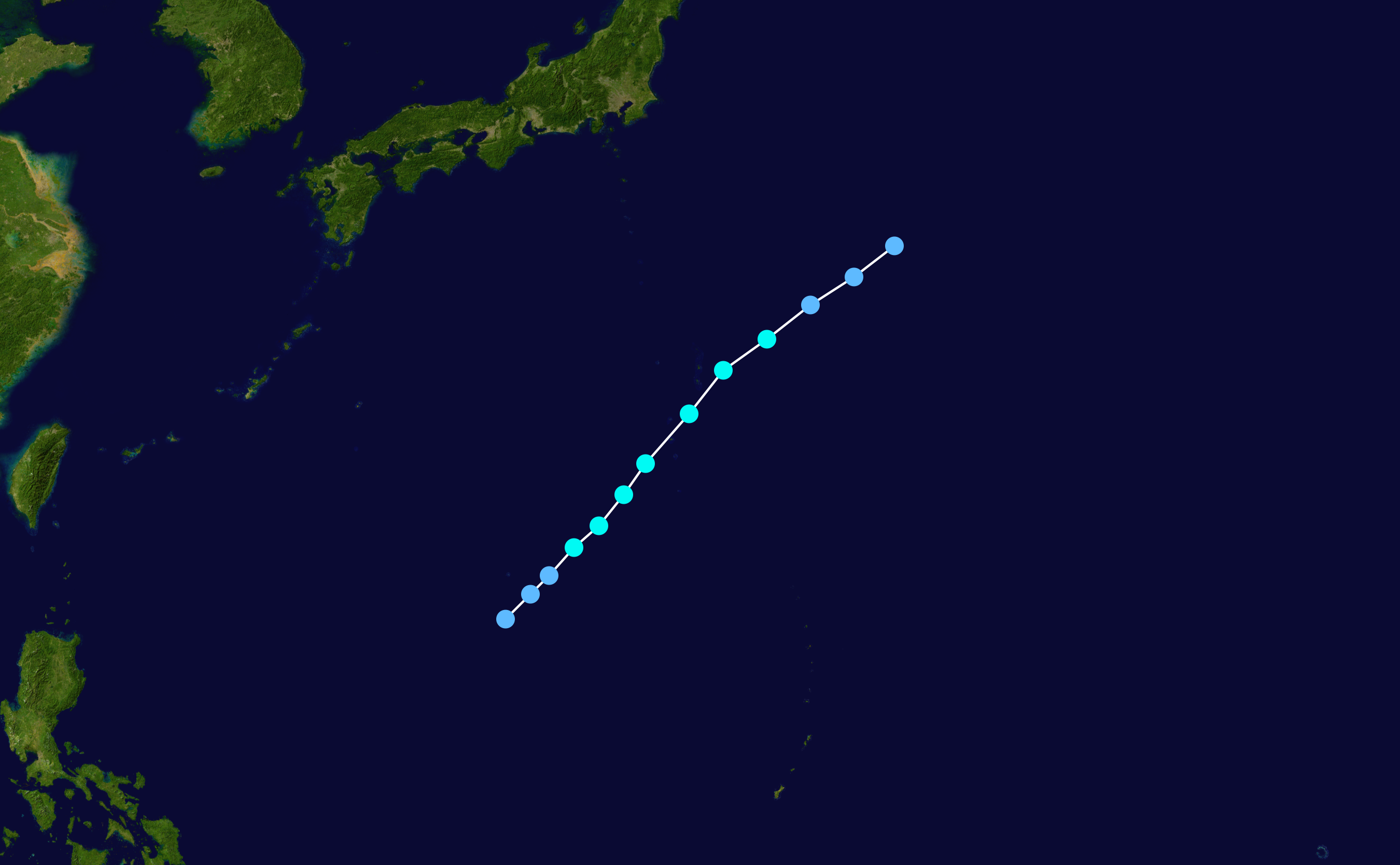
- Duration: May 13 – May 16
- Peak intensity: 100 km/h (65 mph) (1-min); 994 hPa (mbar)

The second named storm of the season, Tropical Storm Betty formed on May 13, 1945, and began to move in a northeastern direction. It strengthened into a tropical storm only 18 hours later and continued on its path. However, the storm eventually moved further north, and into colder waters. Betty weakened into a tropical depression and dissipated on May 16, having not threatened land at all.

=== Typhoon Connie ===
- Category 1 typhoon (SSHWS)
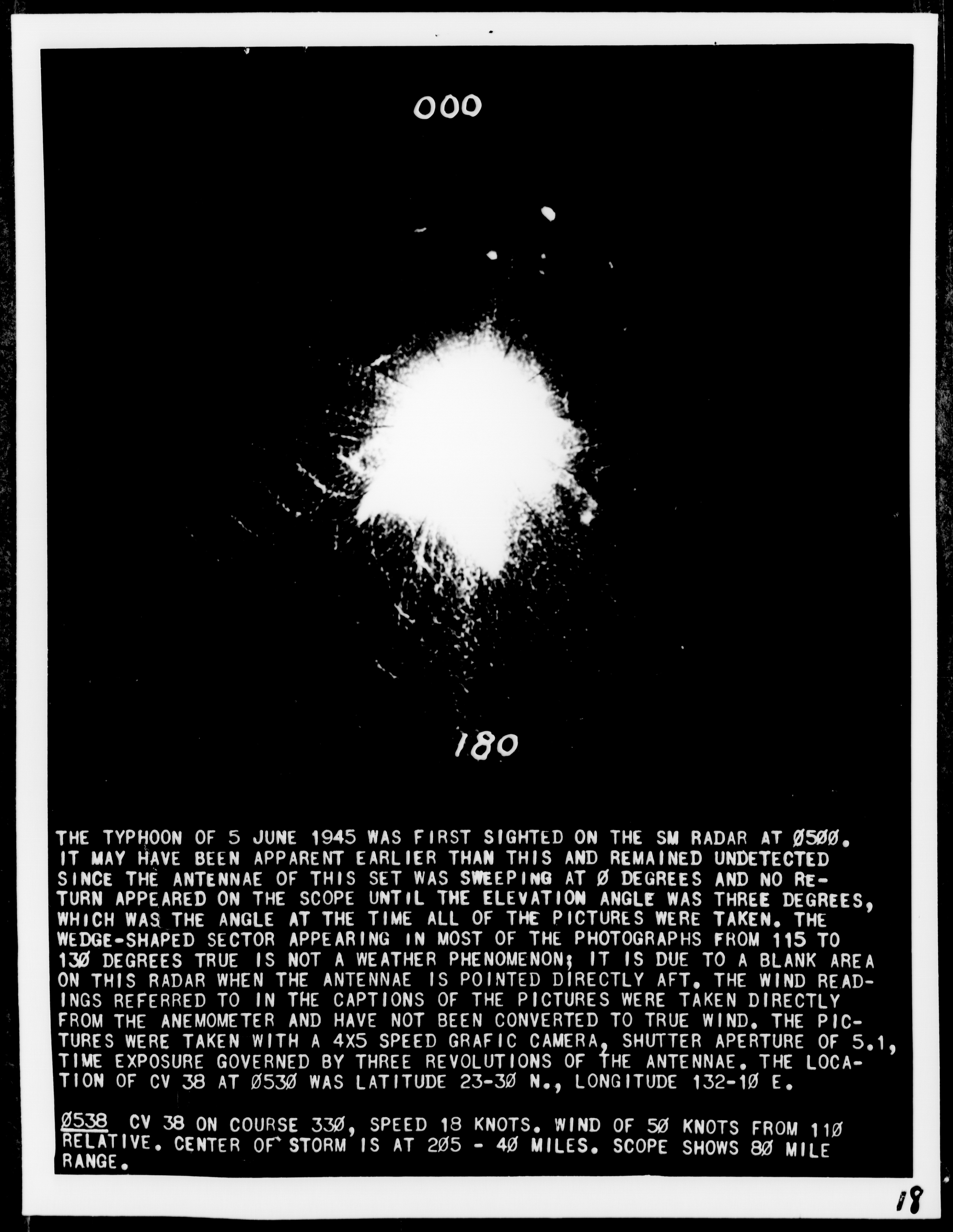
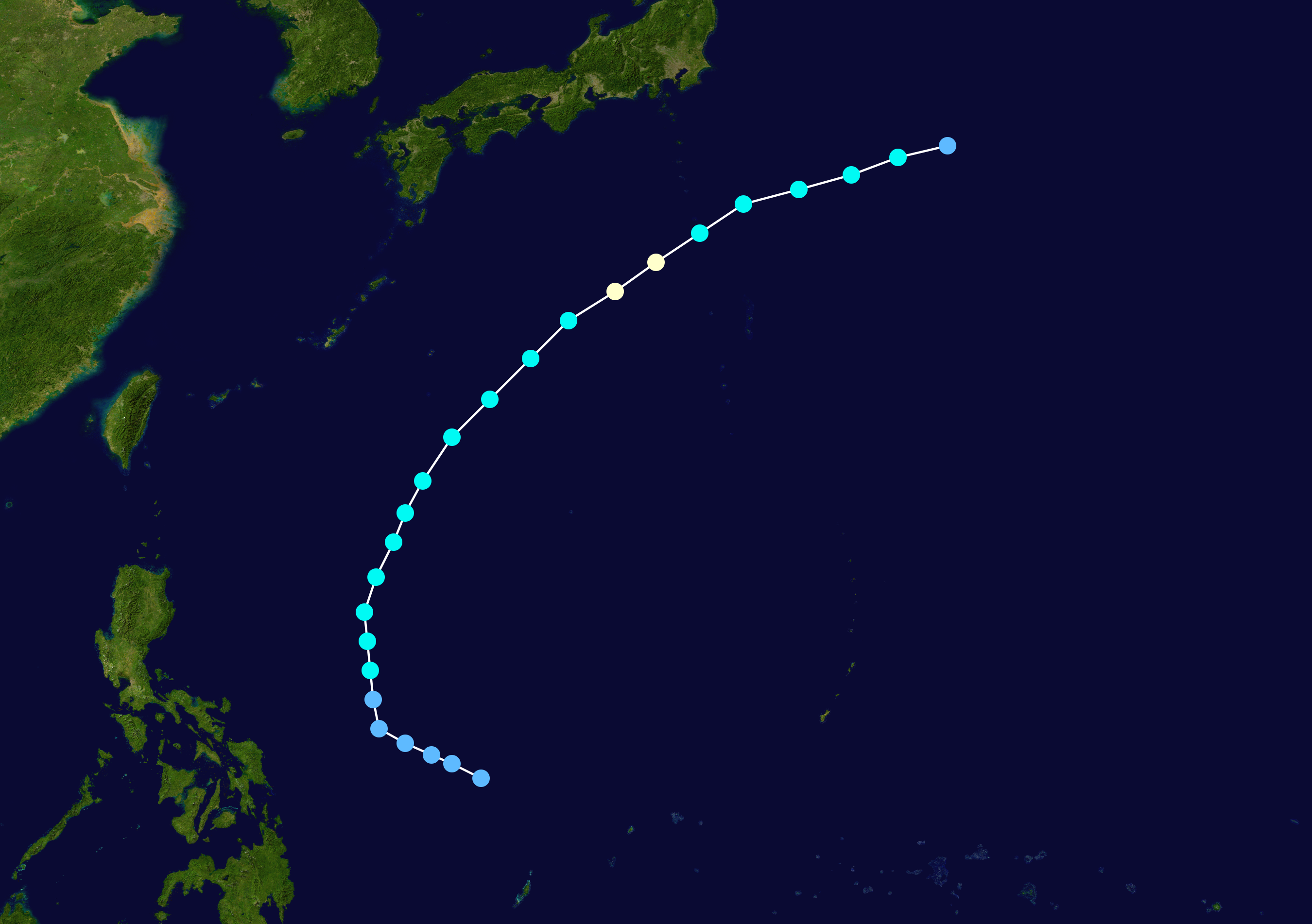
- Duration: June 1 – June 7
- Peak intensity: 130 km/h (80 mph) (1-min); 980 hPa (mbar)

A small yet powerful typhoon, Connie was first spotted on June 1 by the Fleet Weather Center on Guam, moving northeast. Winds were reported to have been as high as 230 km/h (140 mph). But by June 7, it began to weaken. Its final fate is unknown.

The United States Navy's Third Fleet was hit by Connie, which is also referred to as Typhoon Viper. The same fleet had previously been hit, with great loss of life, by Cobra the previous year. Connie was not as powerful as Cobra, but the fleet was still damaged by the storm, with six men killed or lost overboard and four seriously hurt. The ships USS Hornet, USS Bennington, USS Windham Bay, USS Salamaua, USS Pittsburgh, USS Baltimore, and USS Duluth suffered major damage and 26 vessels suffered minor damage. 76 planes were destroyed and 70 suffered damage. The damage sustained during Cobra and Connie led to improvements in design such as faster pumping arrangement for fuel and ballast tanks, better protection from the elements for electrical panels, and an effort to make ships less top heavy. They also sped up the development of storm forecasting and led to the development of hurricane hunters.

=== Tropical Storm Doris ===
- Tropical storm (SSHWS)
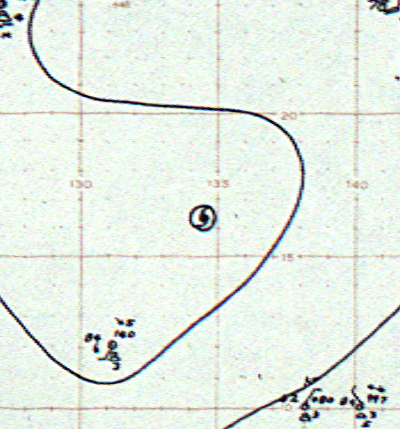
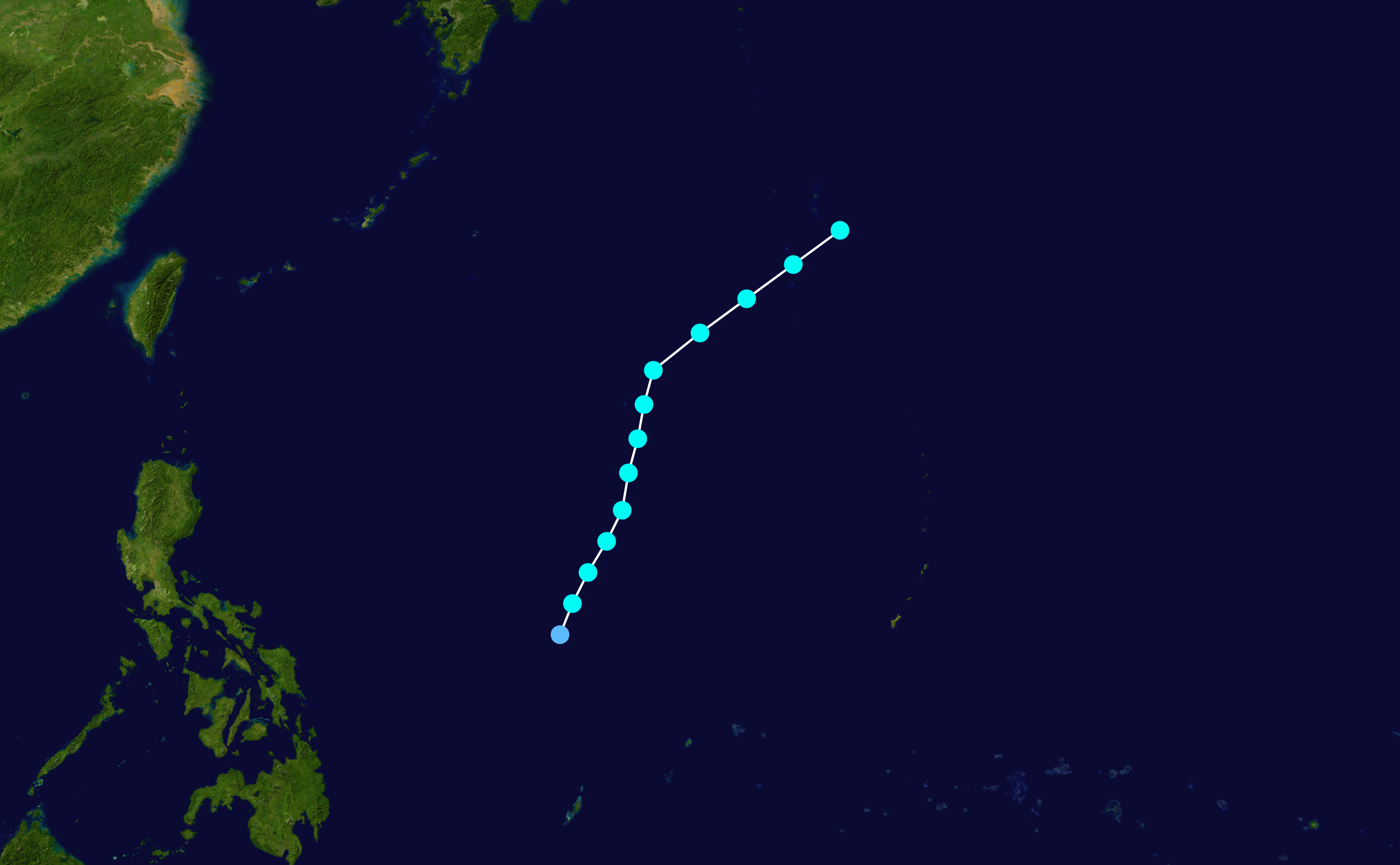
- Duration: June 18 – June 21
- Peak intensity: 85 km/h (50 mph) (1-min); 997 hPa (mbar)

Tropical Storm Doris existed from June 18 to 21 and did not make landfall.

=== Tropical Storm Nancy ===
- Tropical storm (SSHWS)
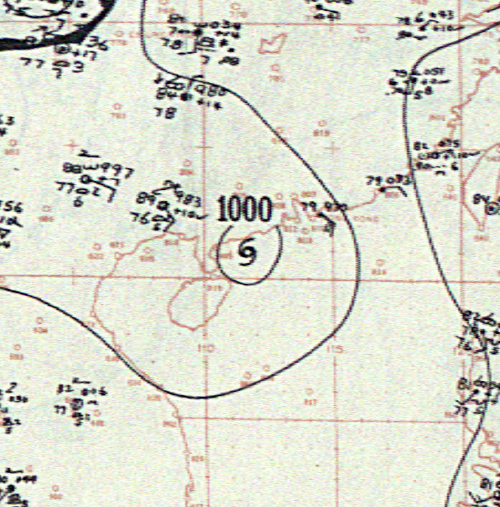
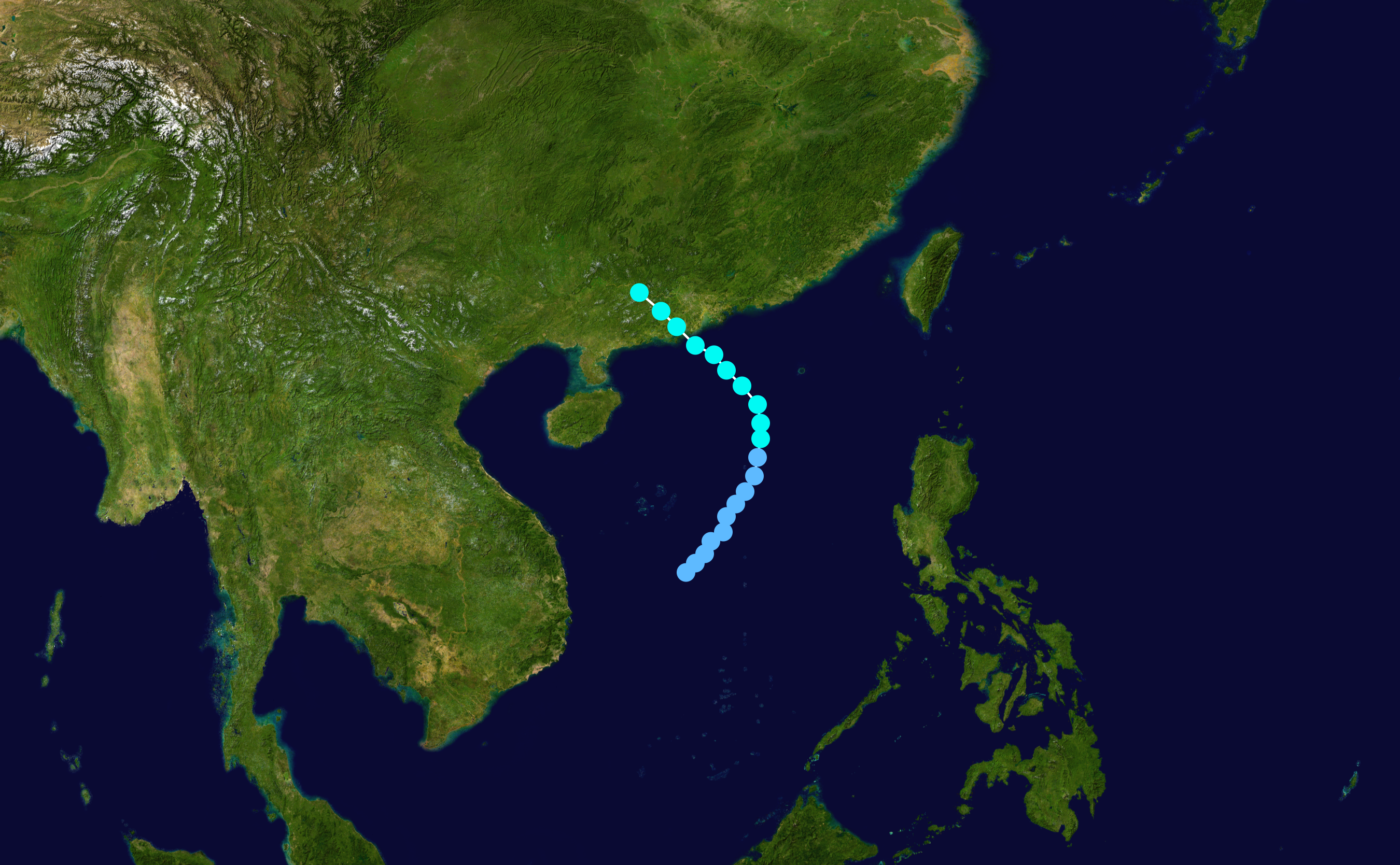
- Duration: July 3 – July 8
- Peak intensity: 95 km/h (60 mph) (1-min); 992 hPa (mbar)

Tropical Storm Nancy formed on July 3 to the east of Vietnam. It started to move in a northeast direction before shifting its course to the northwest until it eventually made landfall near Hong Kong as a tropical storm. It rapidly weakened over land and dissipated on June 8. The damage is unknown.

=== Typhoon Opal ===
- Category 1 typhoon (SSHWS)
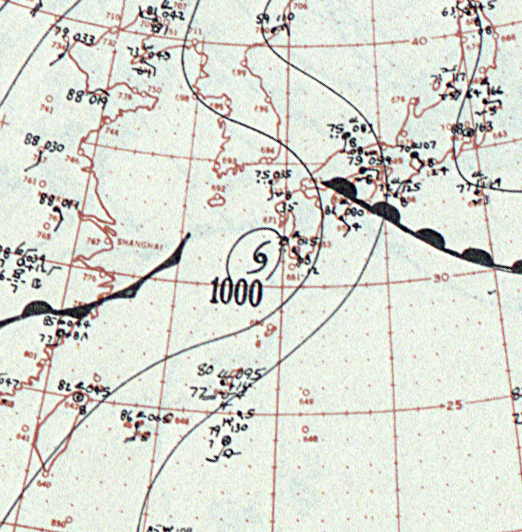
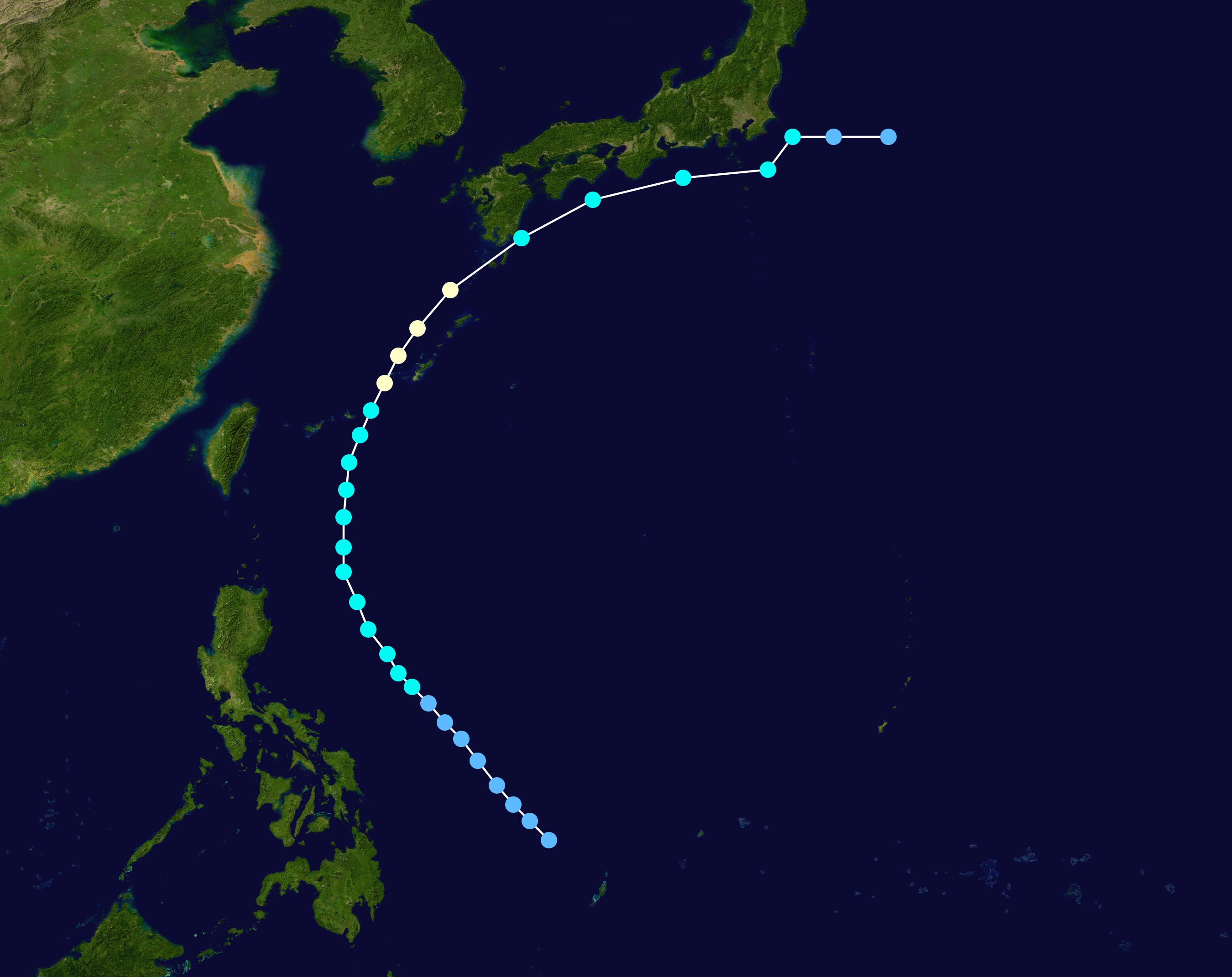
- Duration: July 14 – July 22
- Peak intensity: 120 km/h (75 mph) (1-min); 986 hPa (mbar)

Opal existed from July 14 to July 22.

=== Tropical Storm Peggy ===
- Tropical storm (SSHWS)
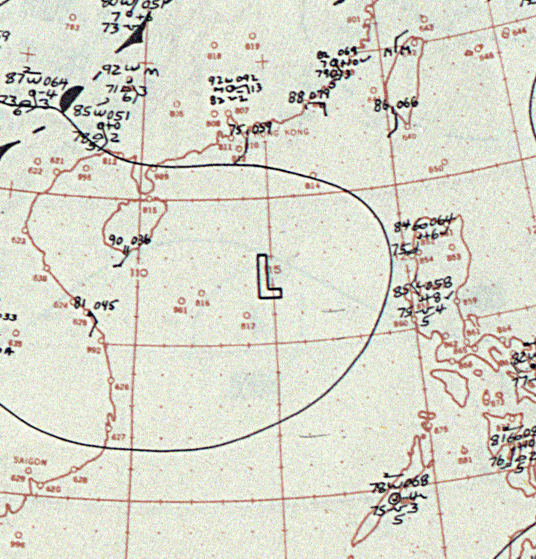
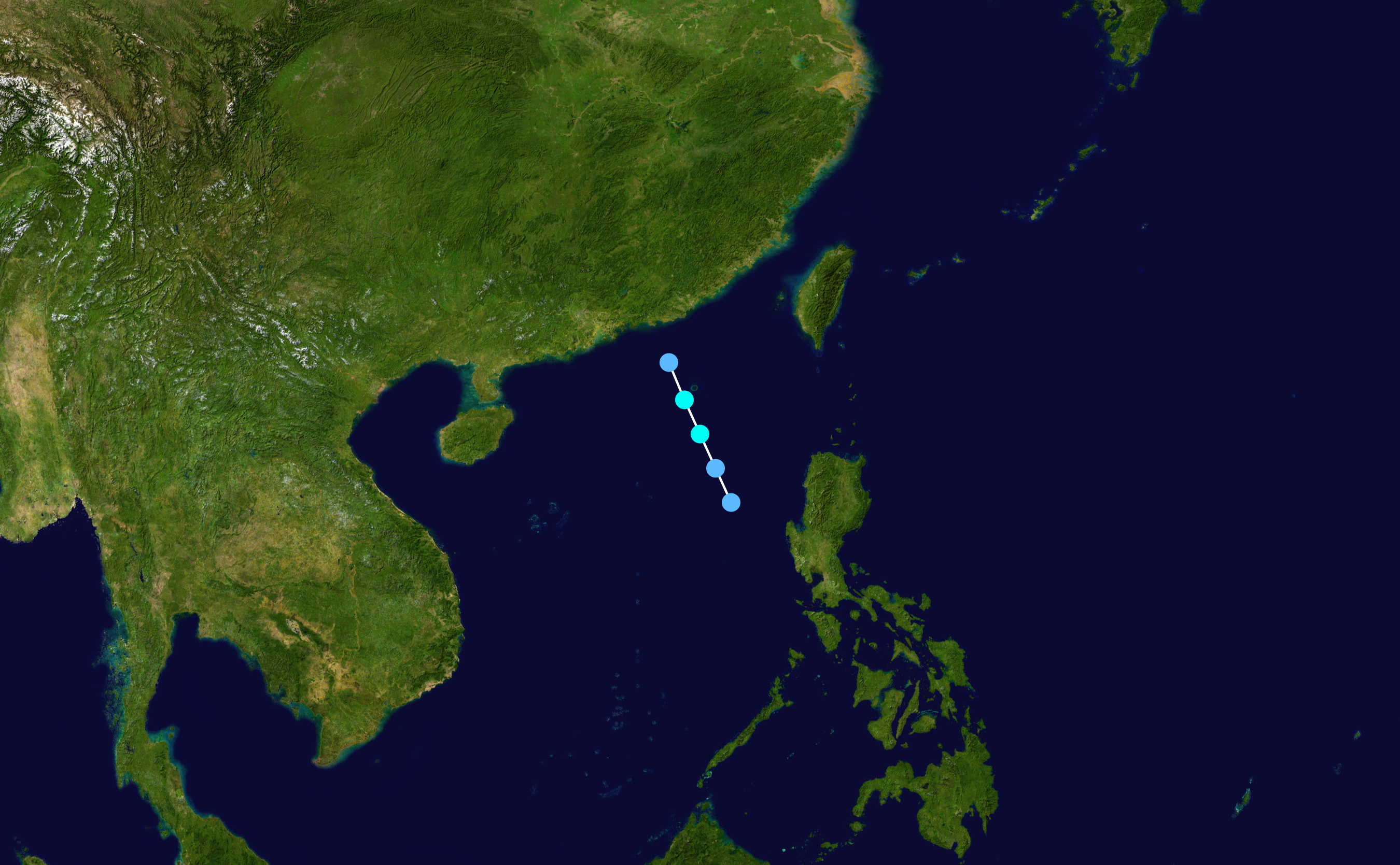
- Duration: July 22 – July 23
- Peak intensity: 65 km/h (40 mph) (1-min); 998 hPa (mbar)

Peggy existed from July 22 to July 23.

=== Tropical Storm Edna ===
- Tropical storm (SSHWS)
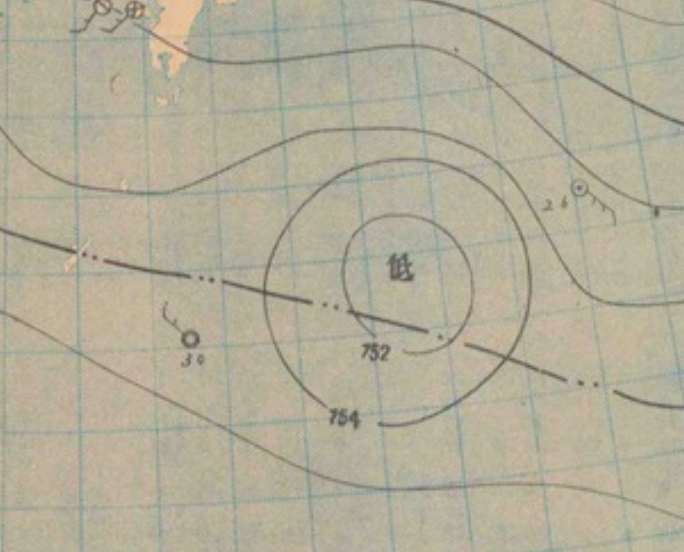
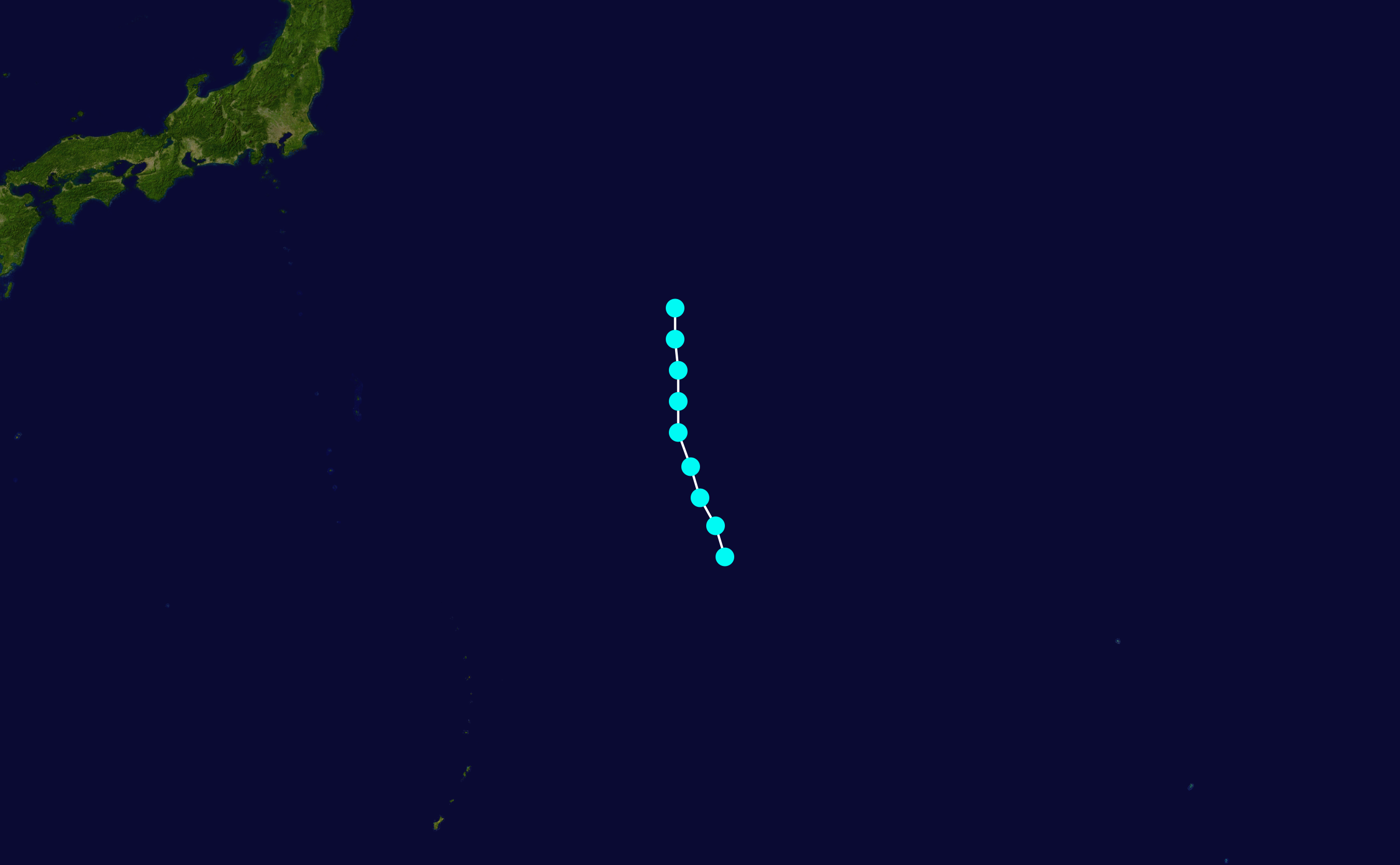
- Duration: July 27 – July 29
- Peak intensity: 75 km/h (45 mph) (1-min); 995 hPa (mbar)

Edna existed from July 27 to July 29.

=== Typhoon Eva ===
- Category 1 typhoon (SSHWS)
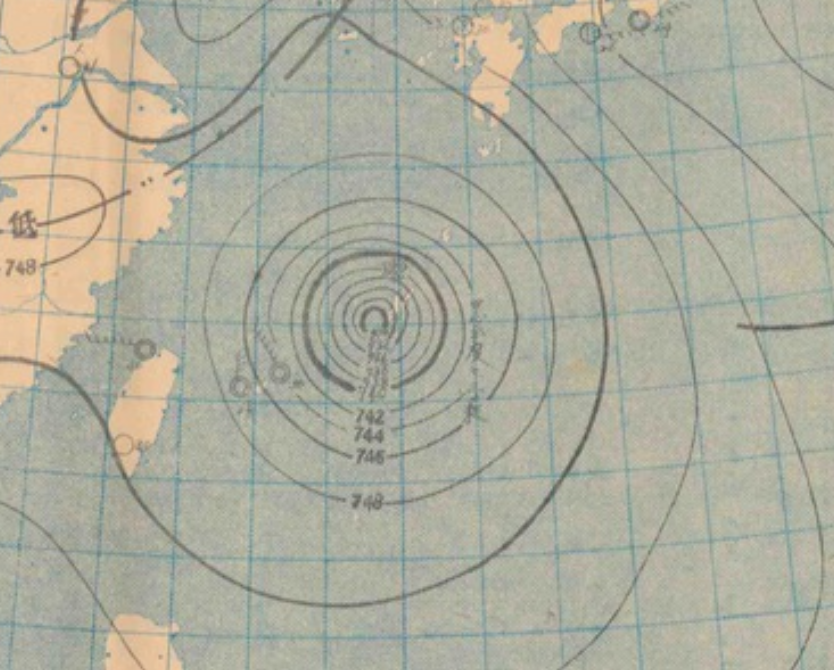
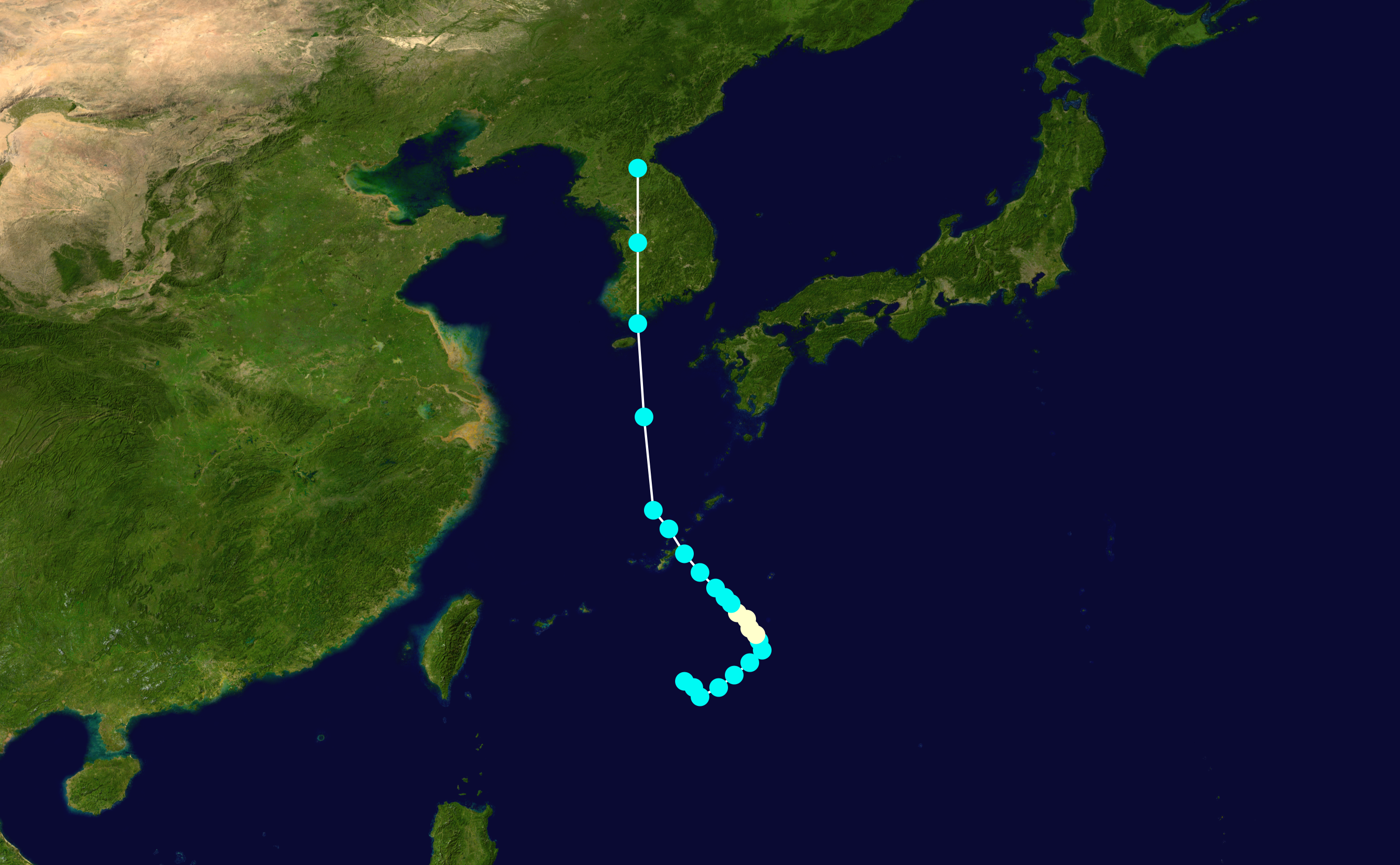
- Duration: July 30 – August 4
- Peak intensity: 150 km/h (90 mph) (1-min); 978 hPa (mbar)

Eva existed from July 30 to August 4.

=== Typhoon Queenie ===
- Category 1 typhoon (SSHWS)
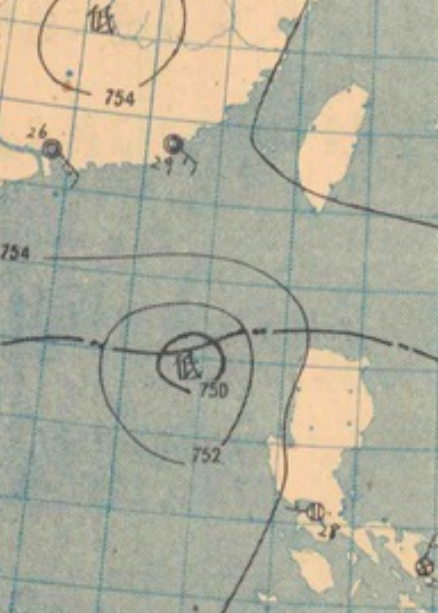
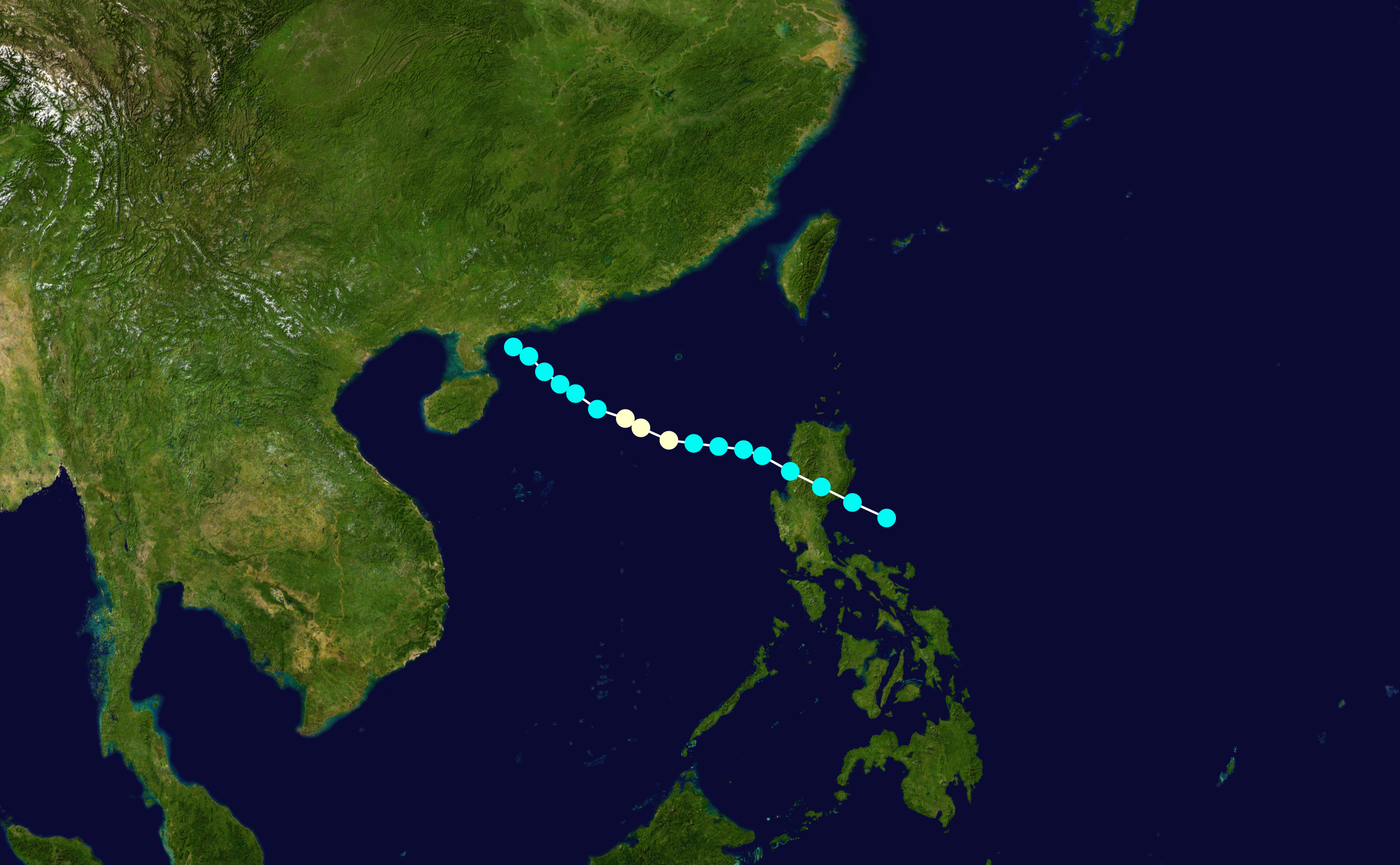
- Duration: August 5 – August 9
- Peak intensity: 150 km/h (90 mph) (1-min); 976 hPa (mbar)

Typhoon Queenie was a storm that formed over the northeastern part of the Philippines on August 5, 1945, and dissipated on August 9, 1945. It had 1-minute sustained winds of 140 km/h (90 mph) and a pressure reading of 976 mb. Queenie formed close to the Philippines and made its way over the northern part, eventually making its way back to the sea where is later dissipated. Damages and fatalities are unknown.

=== Tropical Storm Frances ===
- Tropical storm (SSHWS)
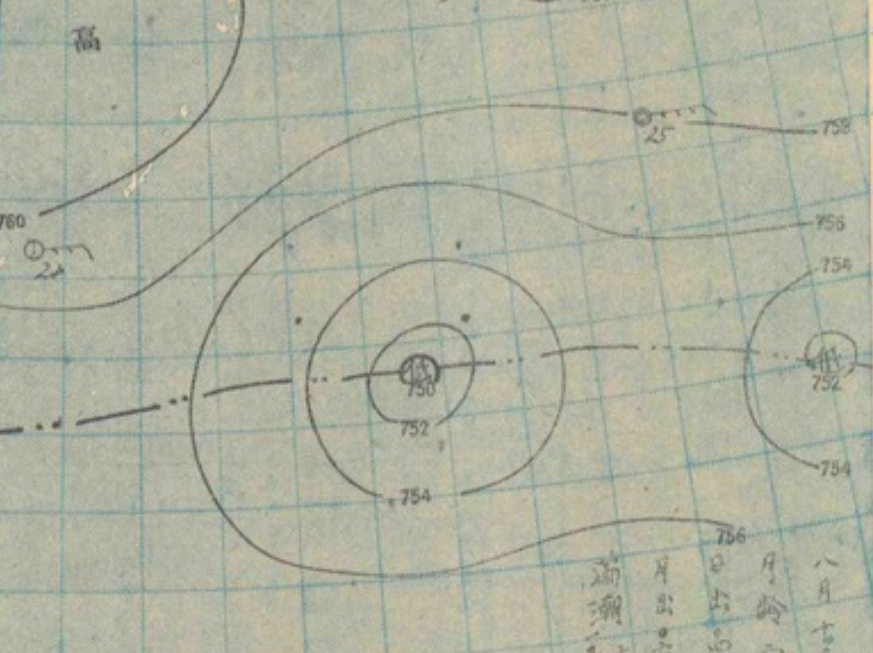
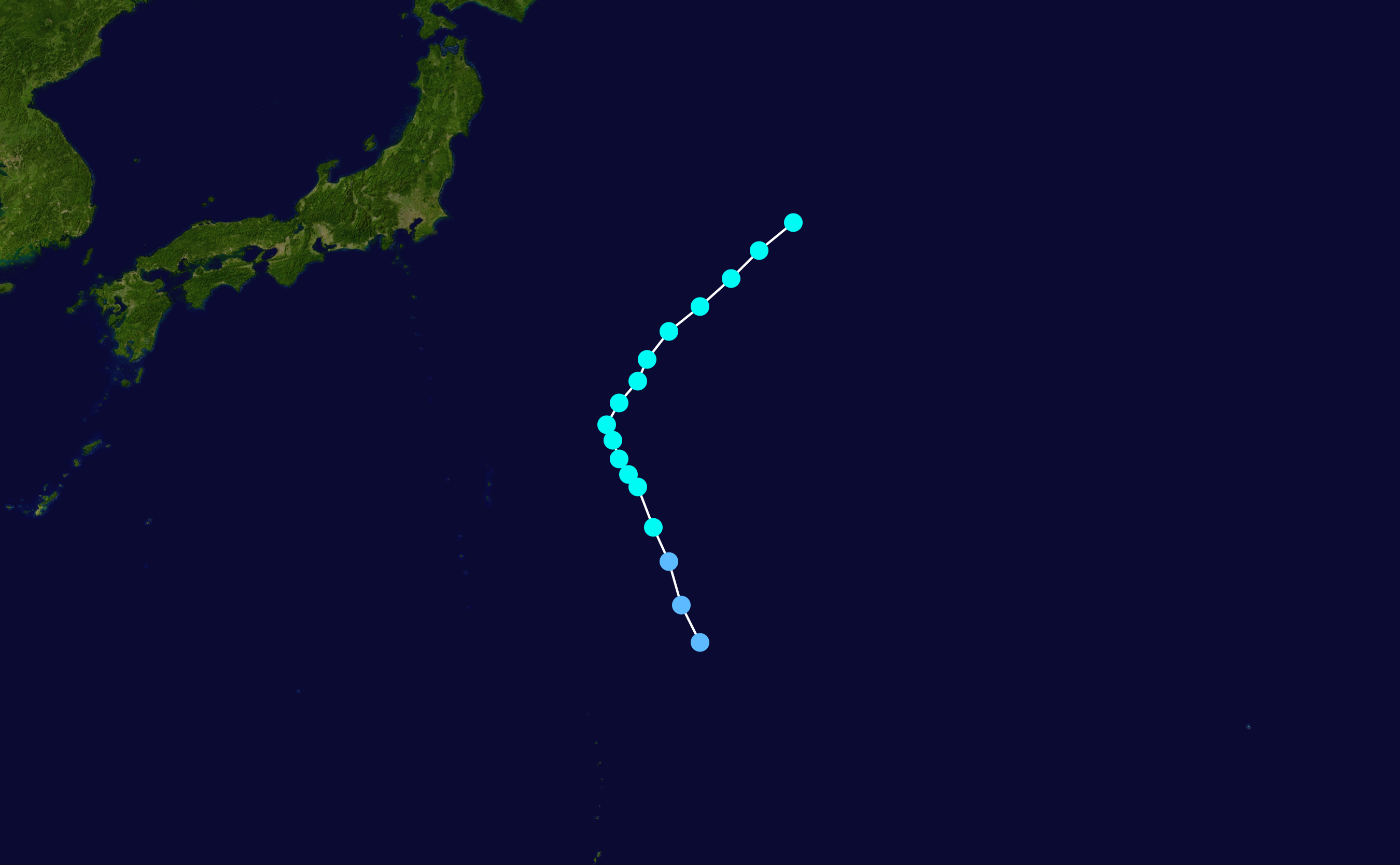
- Duration: August 9 – August 13
- Peak intensity: 95 km/h (60 mph) (1-min); 992 hPa (mbar)

Frances existed from August 9 to August 13.

=== Tropical Storm Grace ===
- Tropical storm (SSHWS)
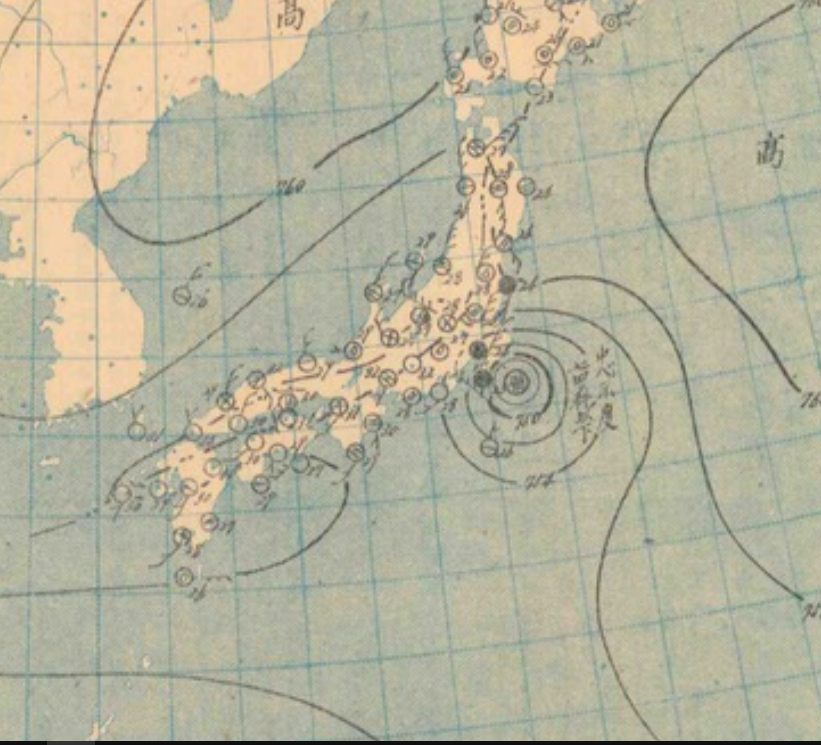
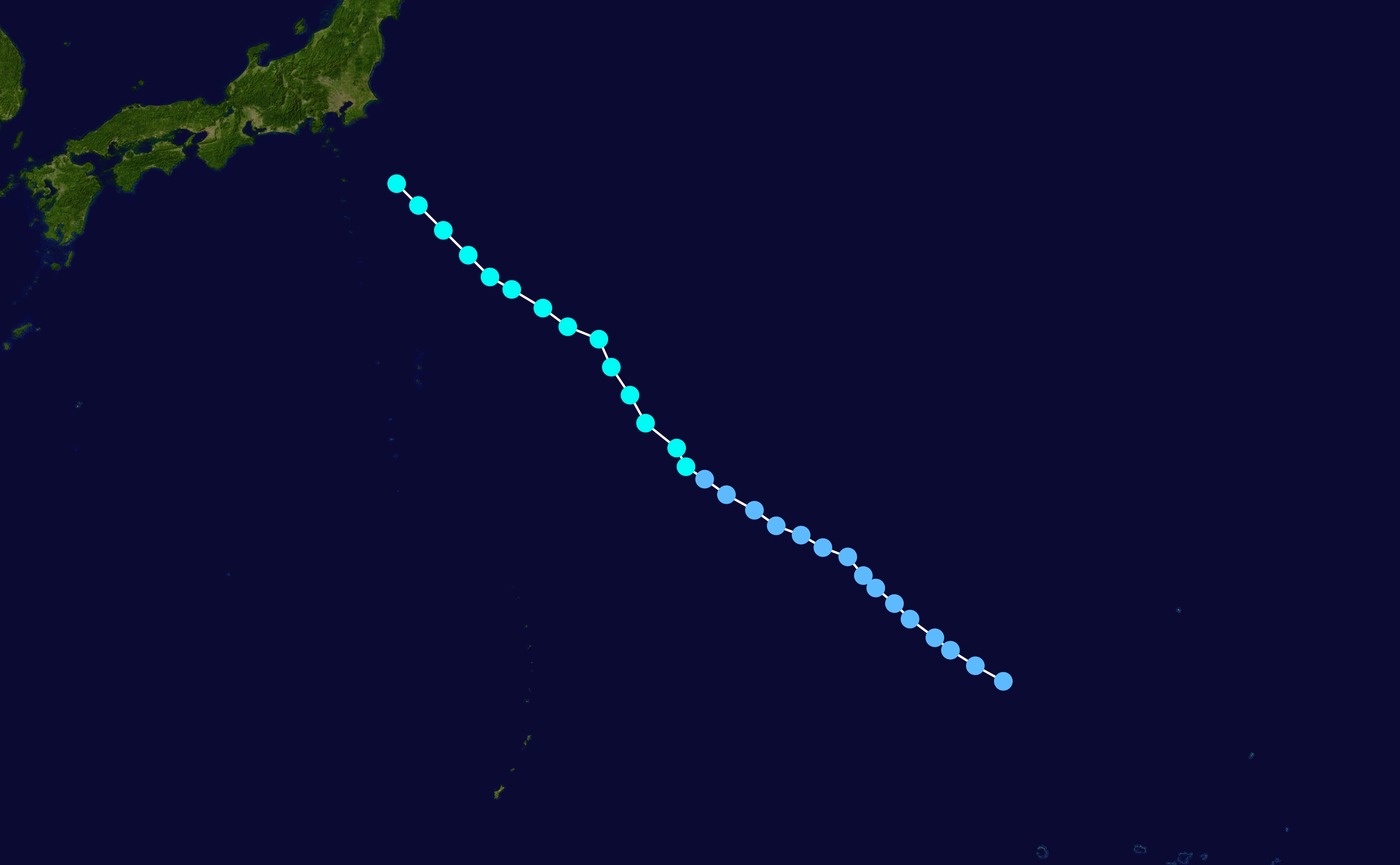
- Duration: August 15 – August 22
- Peak intensity: 110 km/h (70 mph) (1-min); 985 hPa (mbar)

Grace existed from August 15 to August 22.

=== Typhoon Ruth ===
- Category 1 typhoon (SSHWS)
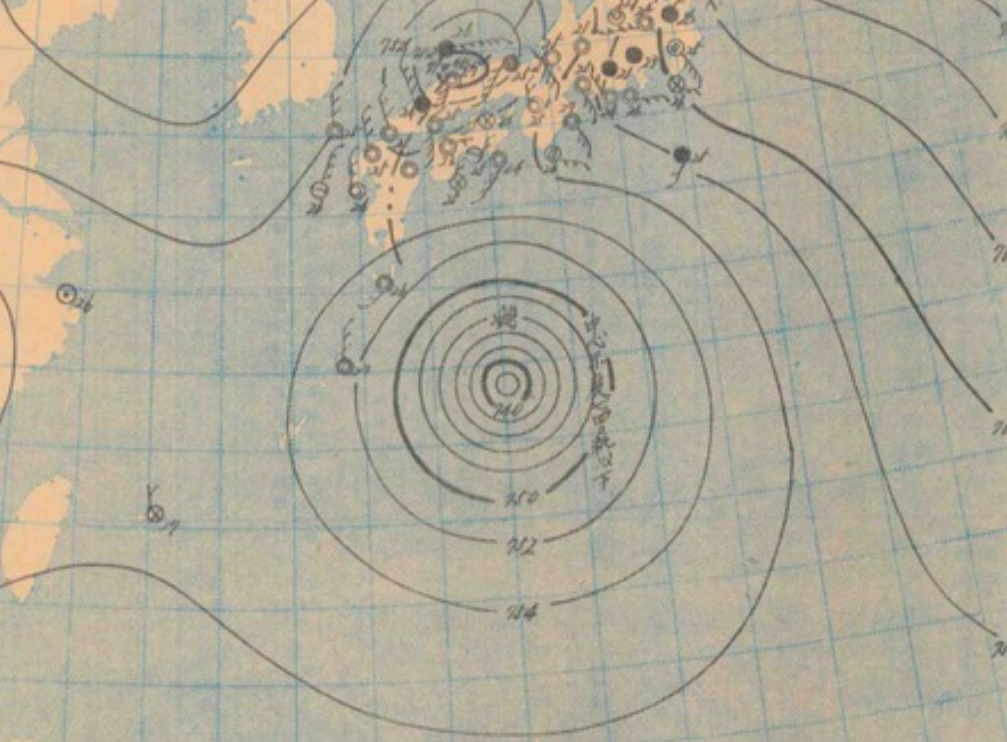
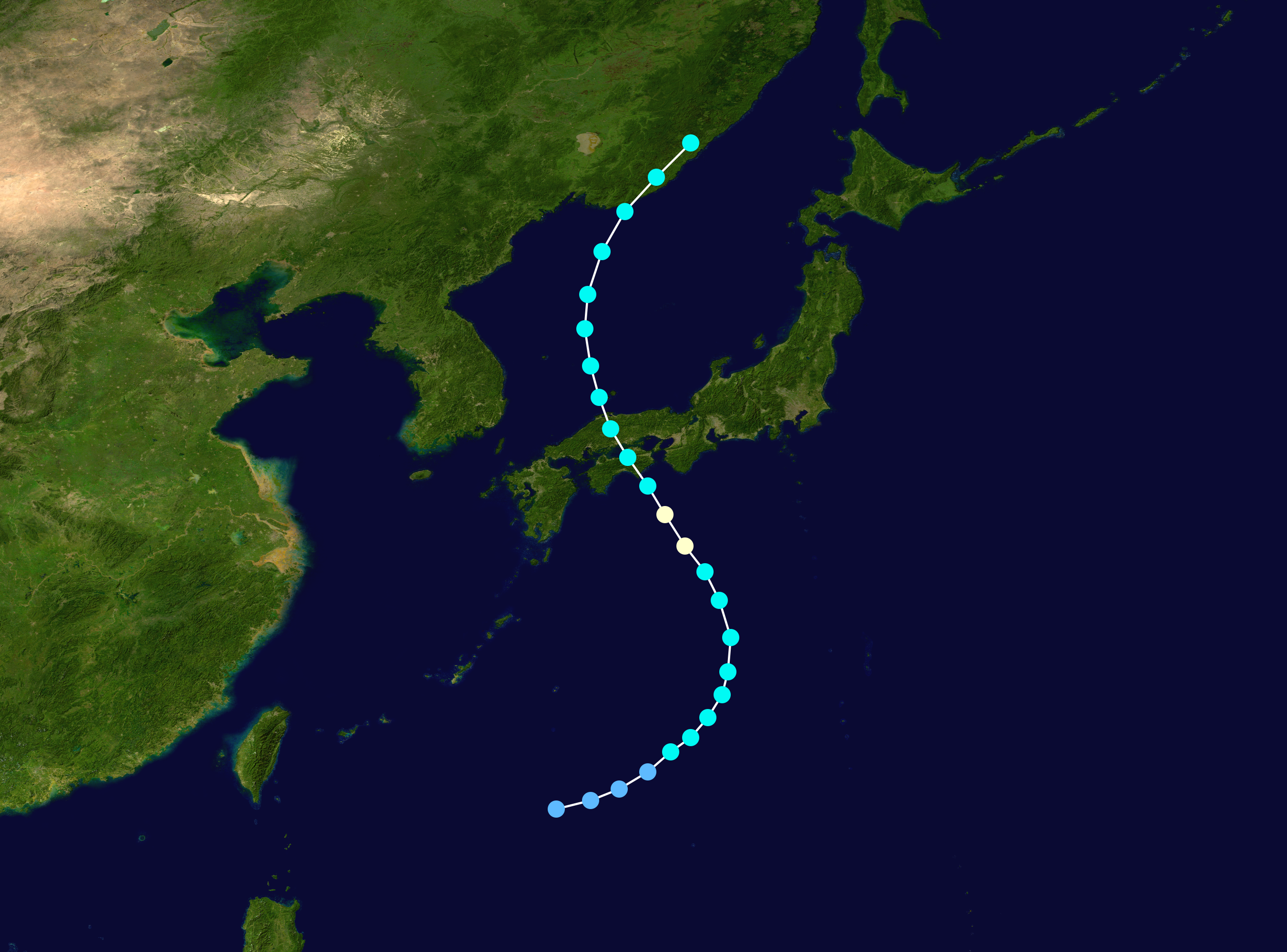
- Duration: August 22 – August 28
- Peak intensity: 130 km/h (80 mph) (1-min); 978 hPa (mbar)

Ruth existed from August 22 to August 28.

=== Typhoon Susan ===
- Category 1 typhoon (SSHWS)
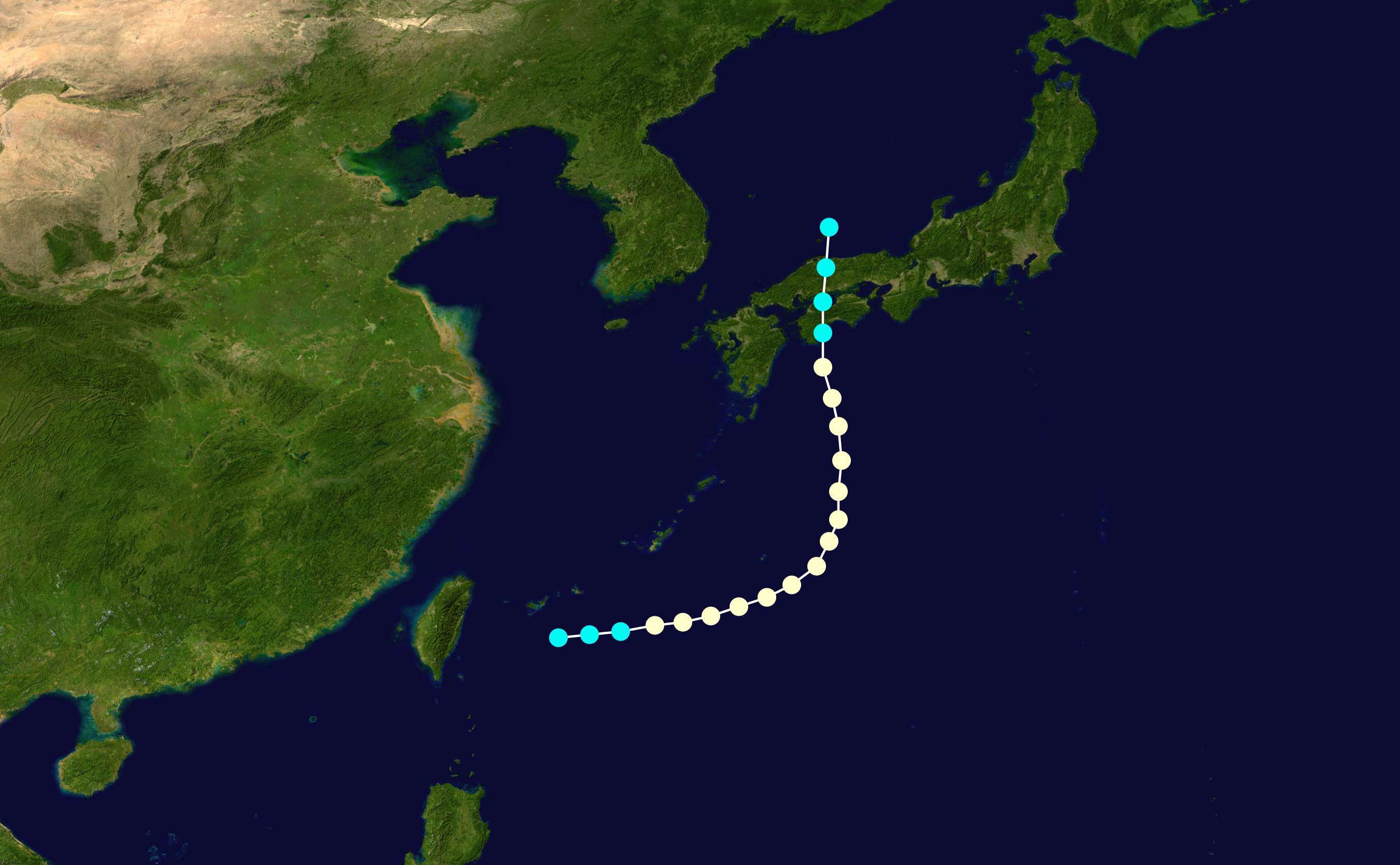
- Duration: August 23 – August 28
- Peak intensity: 150 km/h (90 mph) (1-min); 968 hPa (mbar)

Susan existed from August 23 to August 28.

=== Typhoon Tess ===
- Category 1 typhoon (SSHWS)
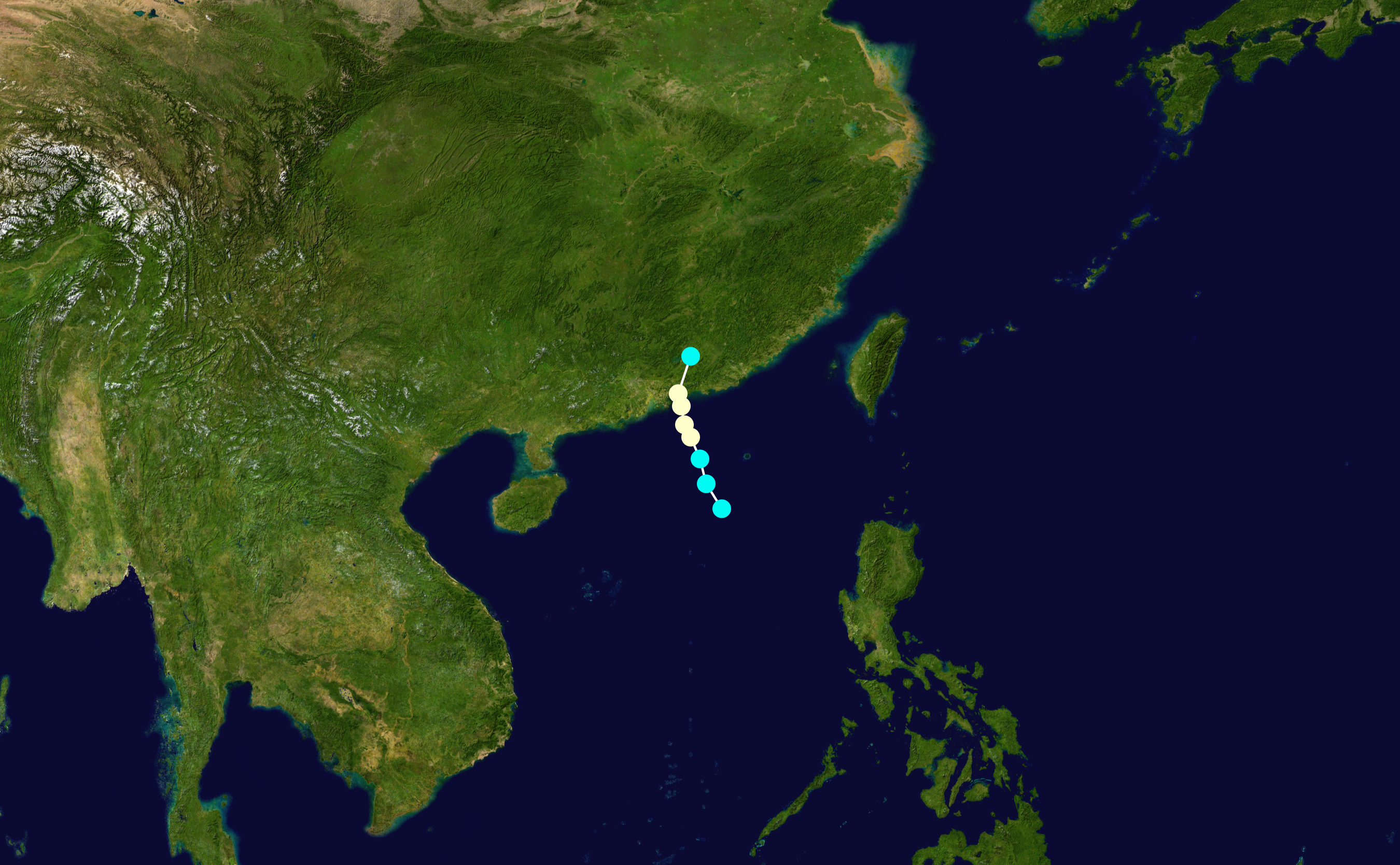
- Duration: August 23 – August 25
- Peak intensity: 130 km/h (80 mph) (1-min); 980 hPa (mbar)

Tess existed from August 23 to August 25.

=== Typhoon Helen ===
- Category 3 typhoon (SSHWS)
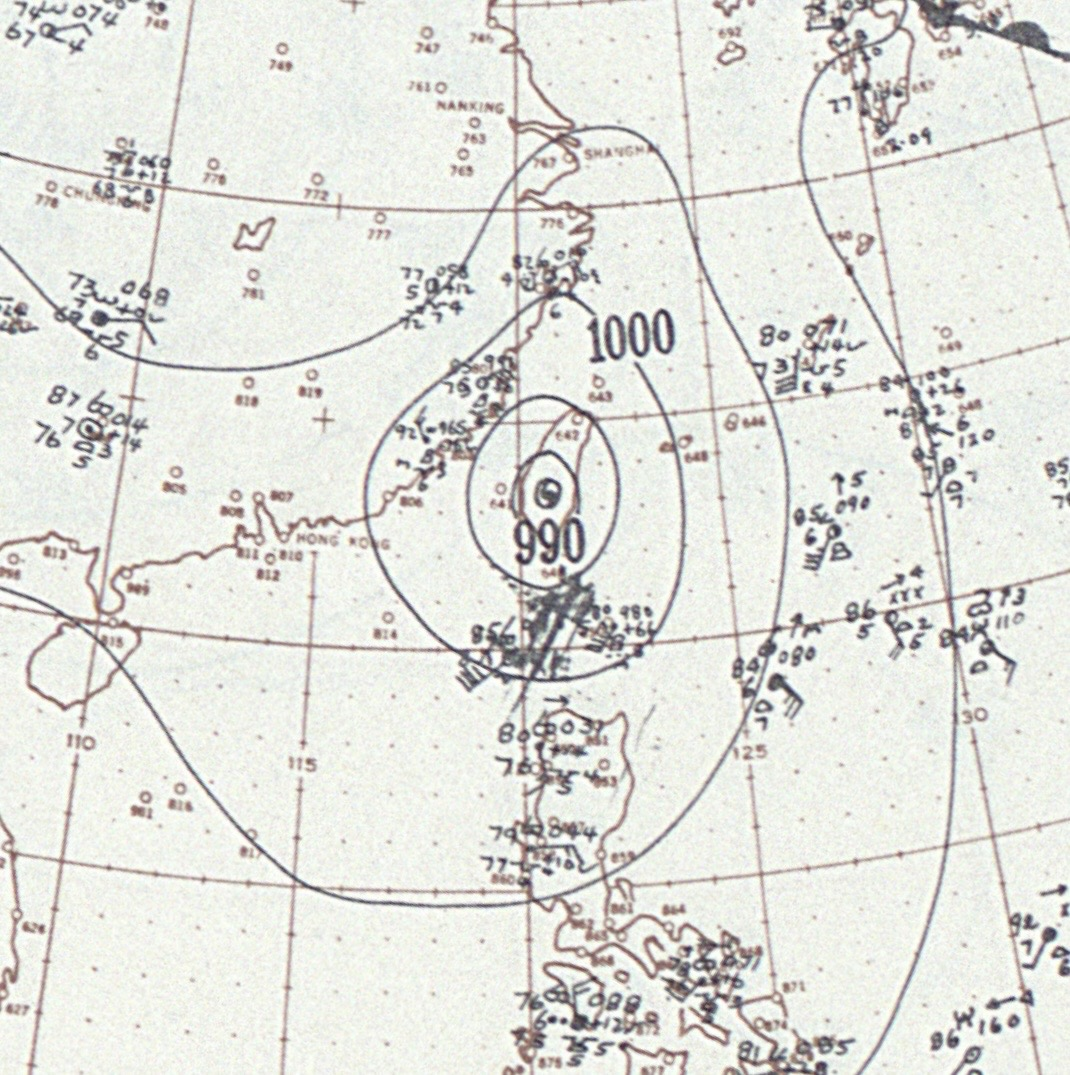
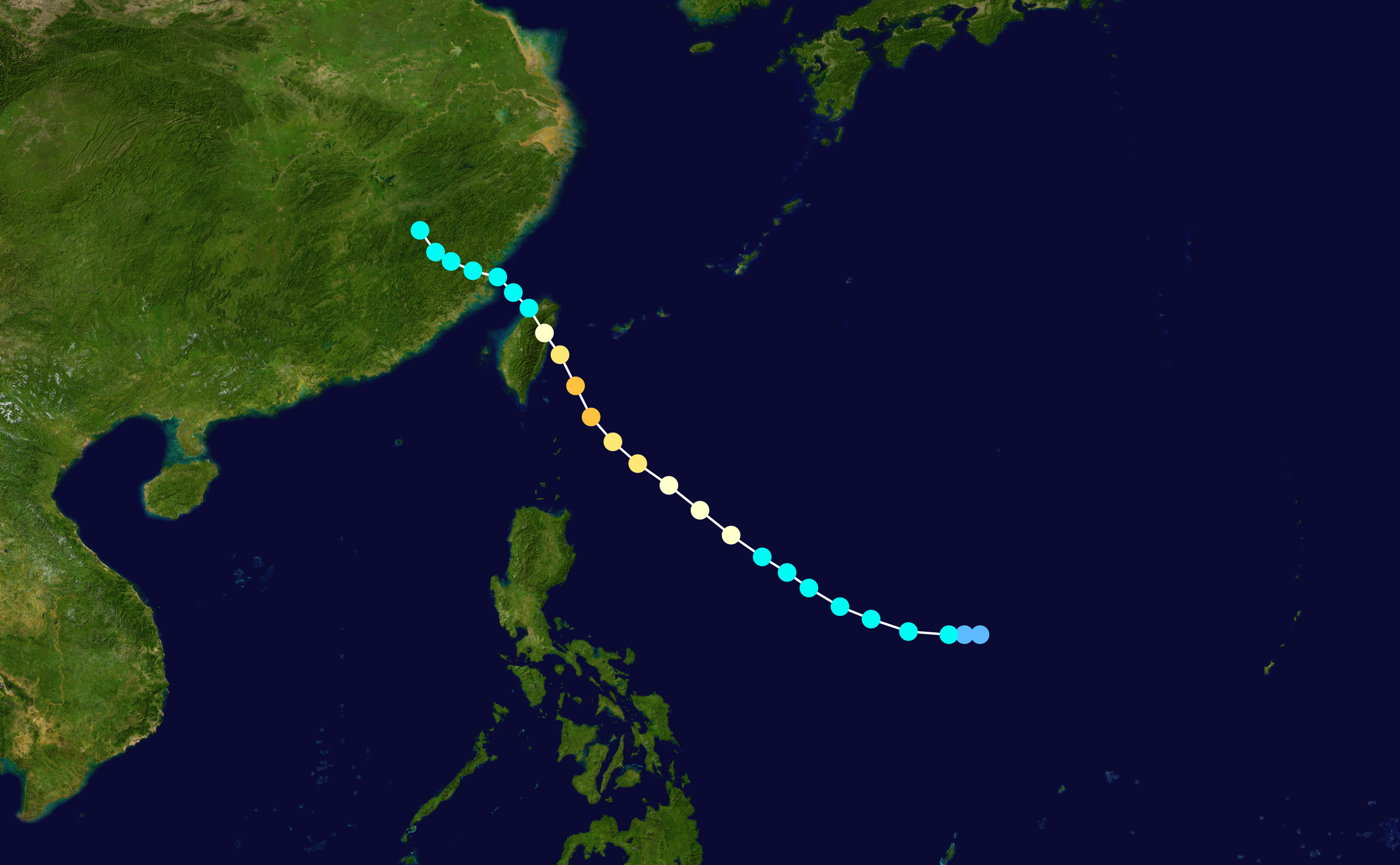
- Duration: August 29 – September 4
- Peak intensity: 195 km/h (120 mph) (1-min); 965 hPa (mbar)

Typhoon Helen formed on August 29. It moved west-northwest and strengthened into a category 3 typhoon with 190 km/h (120 mph) winds. It weakened slightly to a category two and struck Taiwan. It was briefly over water before it hit Mainland China as a tropical storm. It rapidly weakened and dissipated on September 4.

=== Typhoon Ursula ===
- Category 2 typhoon (SSHWS)
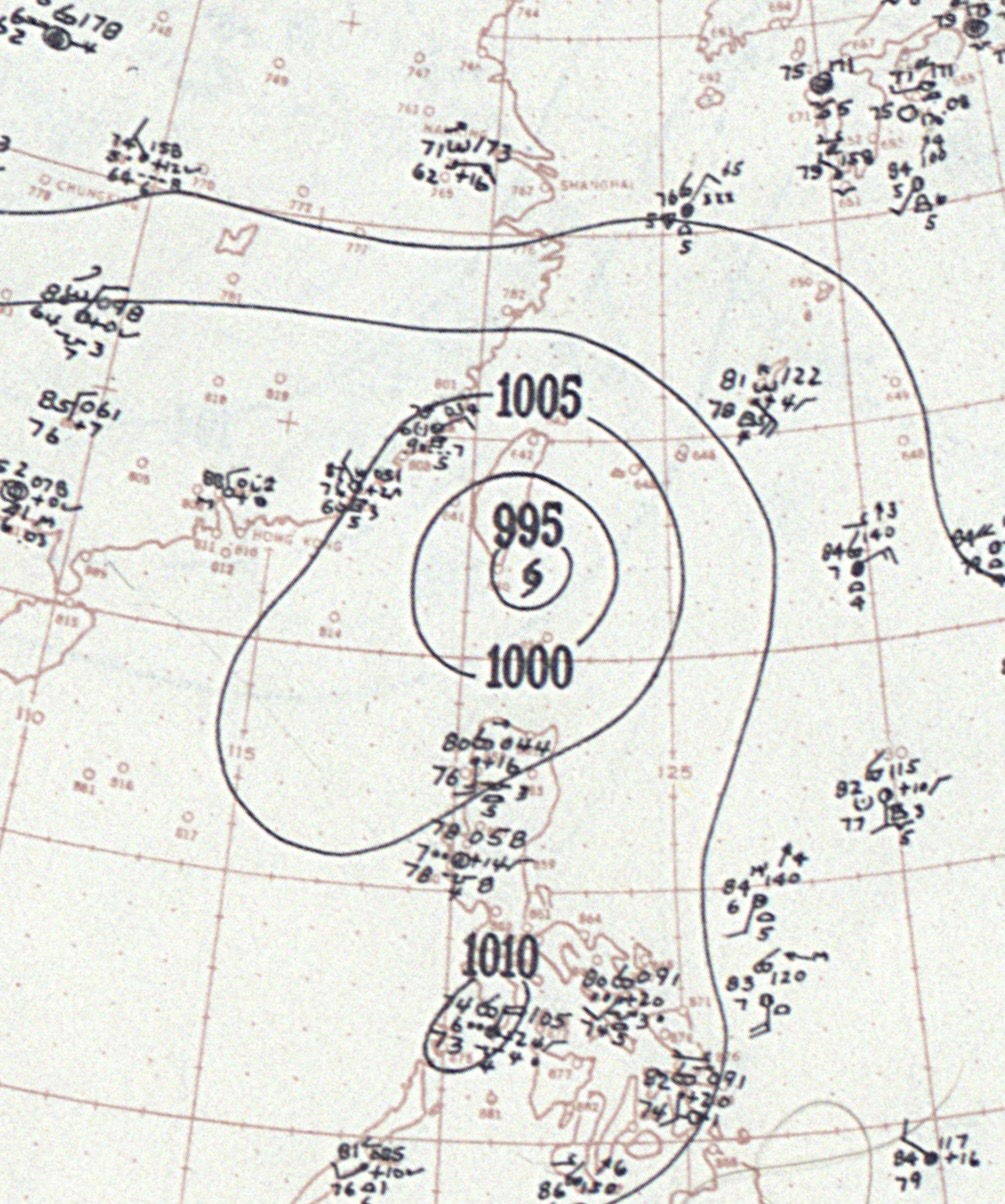
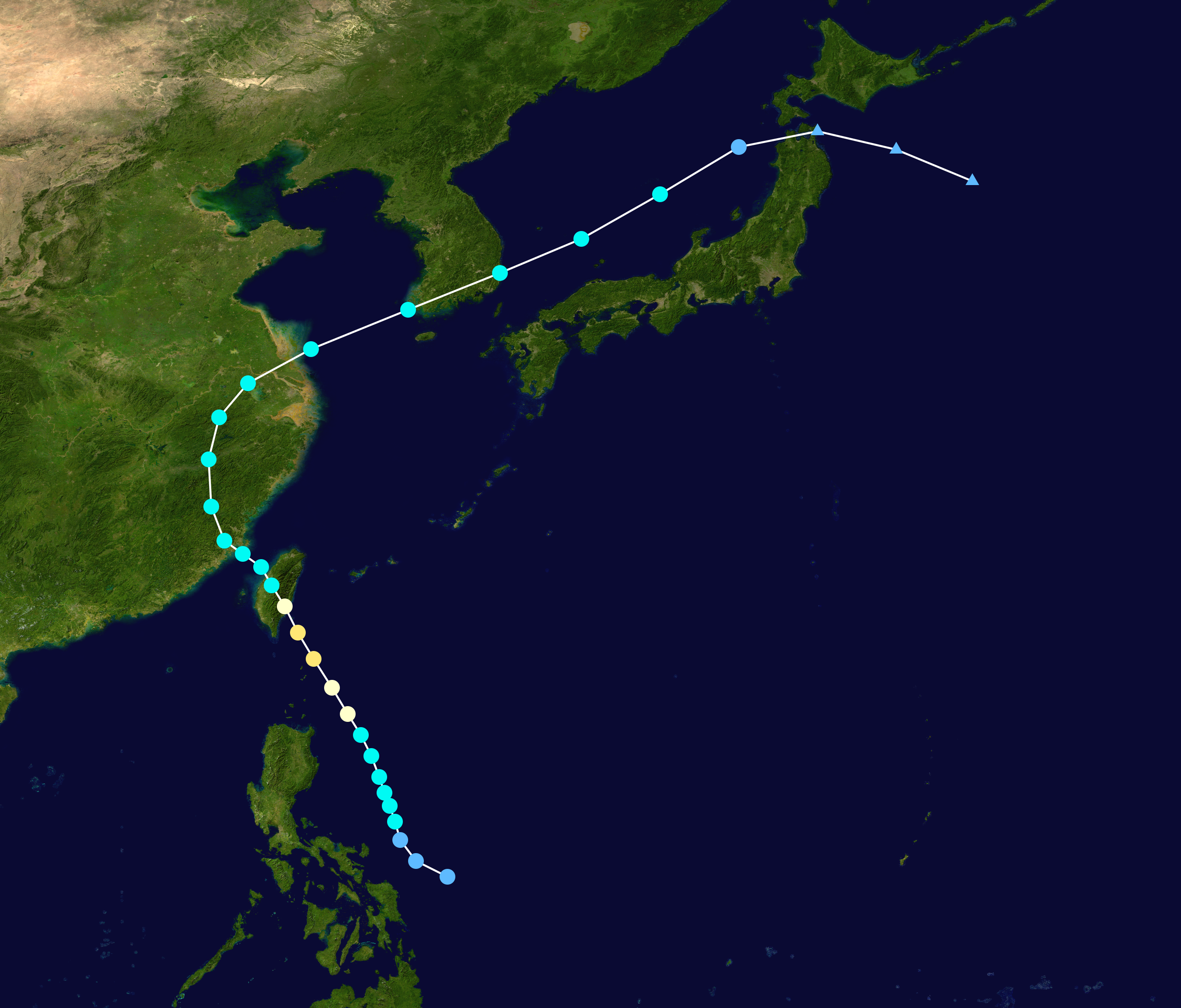
- Duration: September 7 – September 15
- Peak intensity: 165 km/h (105 mph) (1-min); 968 hPa (mbar)

This typhoon is especially remembered for the six aircraft containing liberated prisoners of war brought down by the typhoon between Okinawa and Manila. Over 120 servicemen lost their lives. At the time, it was the single greatest loss of life in an aviation disaster during peacetime.

=== Typhoon Ida ===
- Category 1 typhoon (SSHWS)
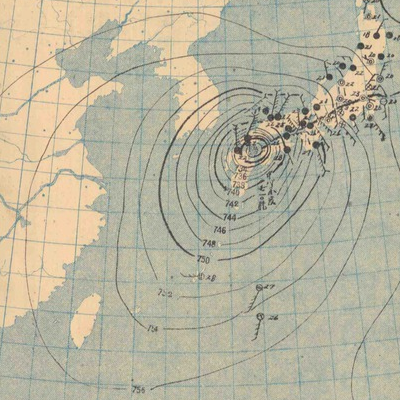
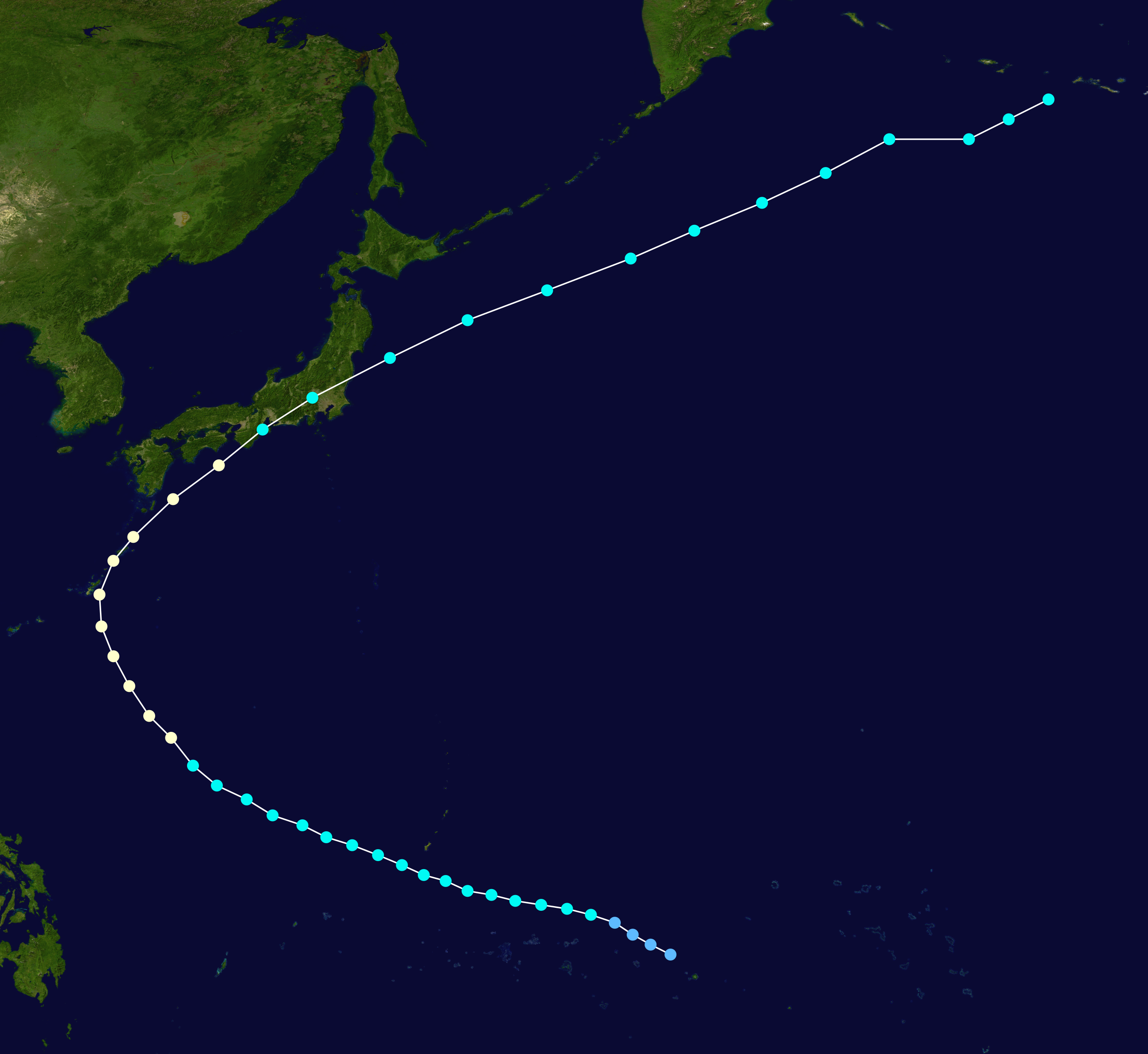
- Duration: September 10 – September 20
- Peak intensity: 130 km/h (80 mph) (1-min); 917 hPa (mbar)

In Japan, Typhoon Ida is called Makurazaki Typhoon. It was the strongest typhoon to hit Kyushu on record, with a minimum sea-level pressure of 916.1 hPa (27.05 inHg) observed on the land and a maximum wind gust of 62.7 metres per second (140 mph), which was recorded at a weather station in Makurazaki. More than 2,000 people were killed in the Hiroshima Prefecture after heavy rains brought by a weakening Ida caused severe landslides.

=== Tropical Storm Verna ===
- Tropical storm (SSHWS)
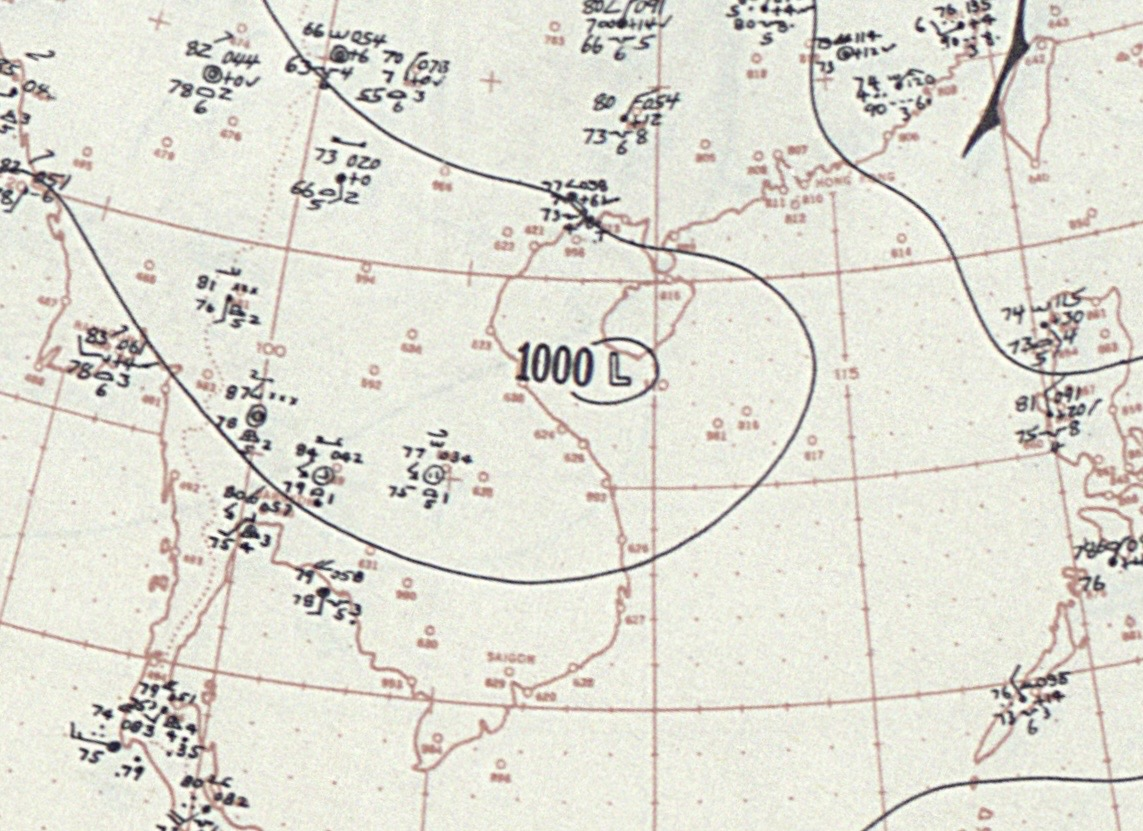
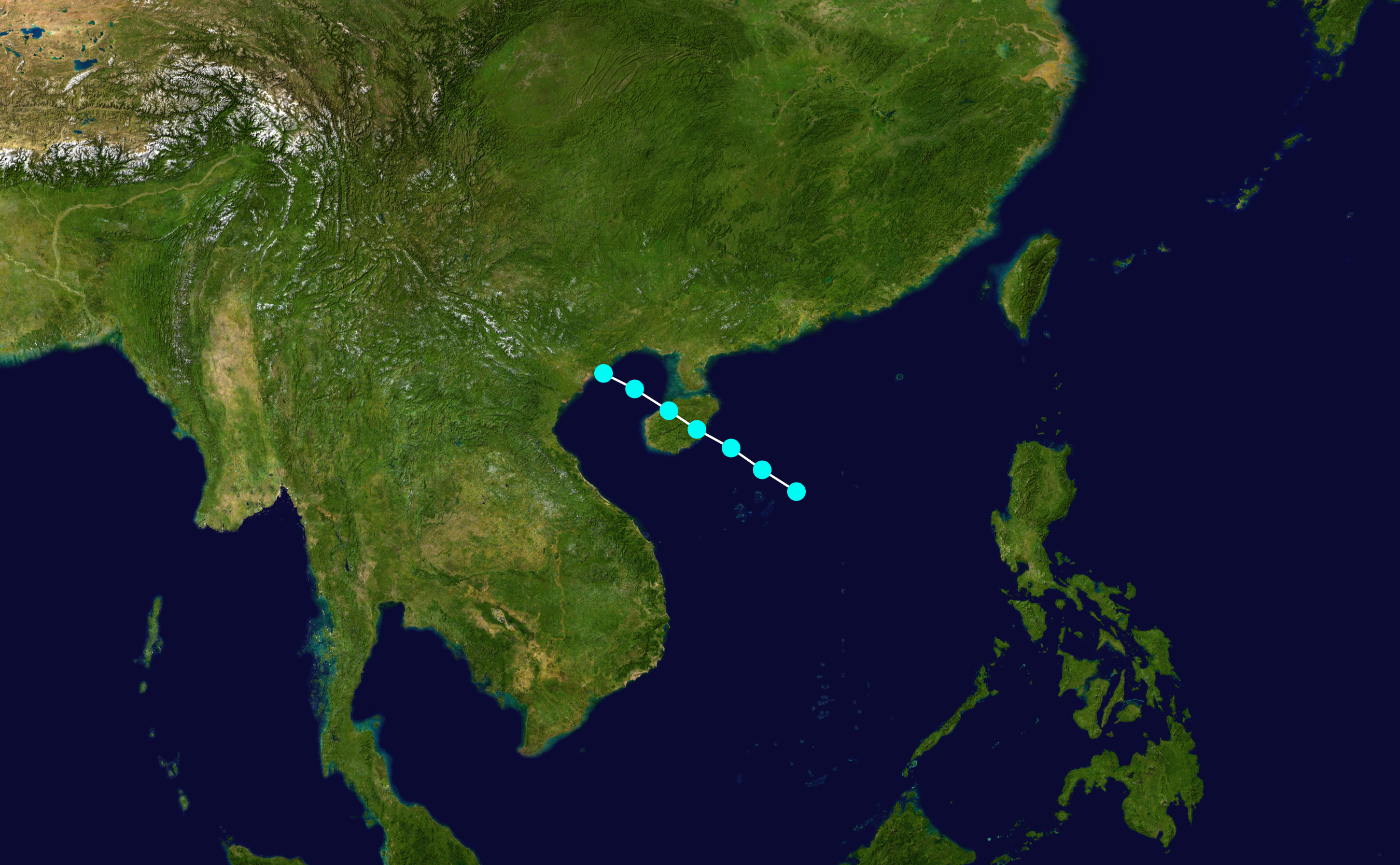
- Duration: September 20 – September 22
- Peak intensity: 95 km/h (60 mph) (1-min); 988 hPa (mbar)

Verna existed from September 20 to September 22.

=== Tropical Storm Wanda ===
- Tropical storm (SSHWS)
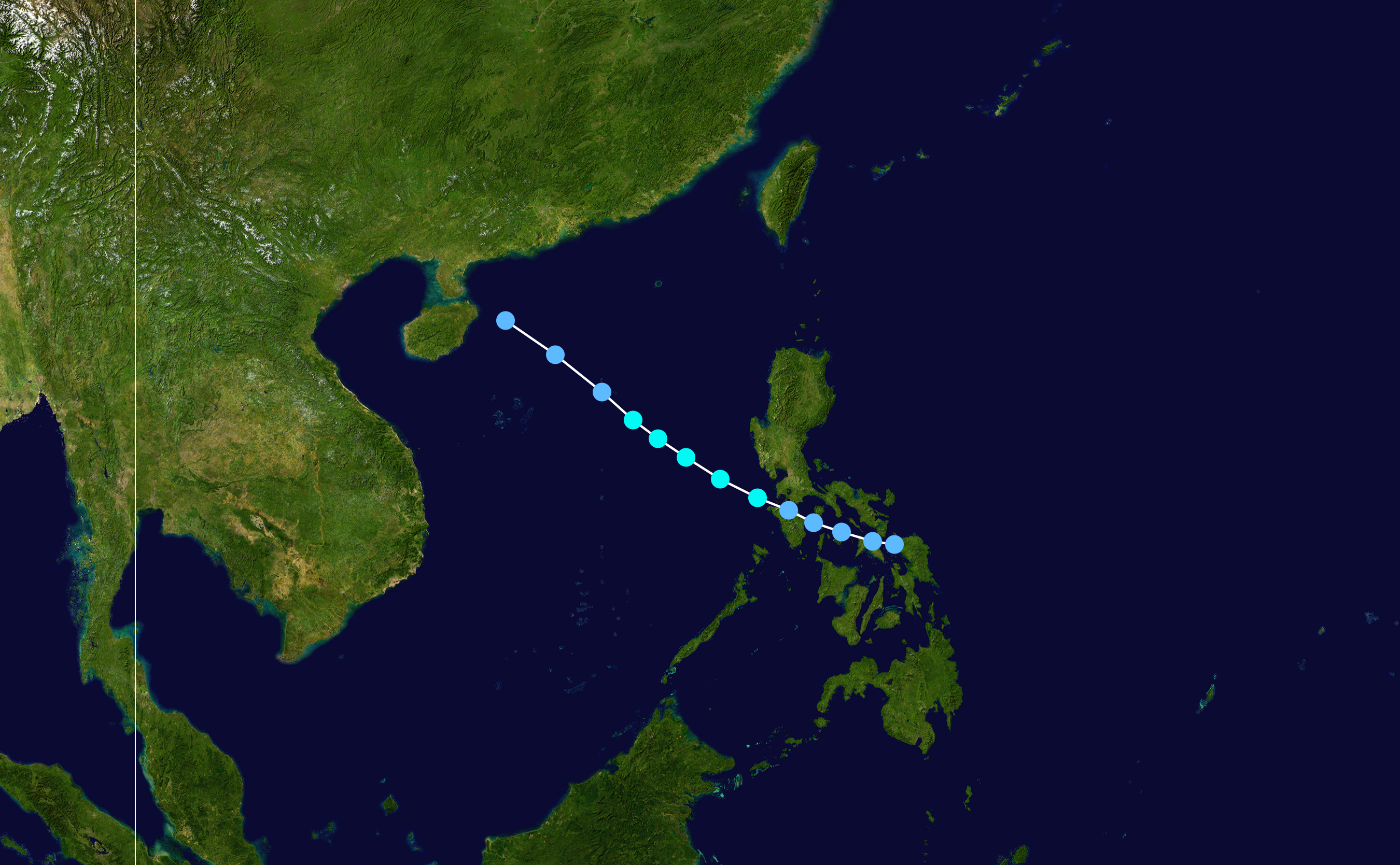
- Duration: September 21 – September 24
- Peak intensity: 75 km/h (45 mph) (1-min); 998 hPa (mbar)

Wanda existed from September 21 to September 24.

=== Typhoon Jean ===
- Category 2 typhoon (SSHWS)
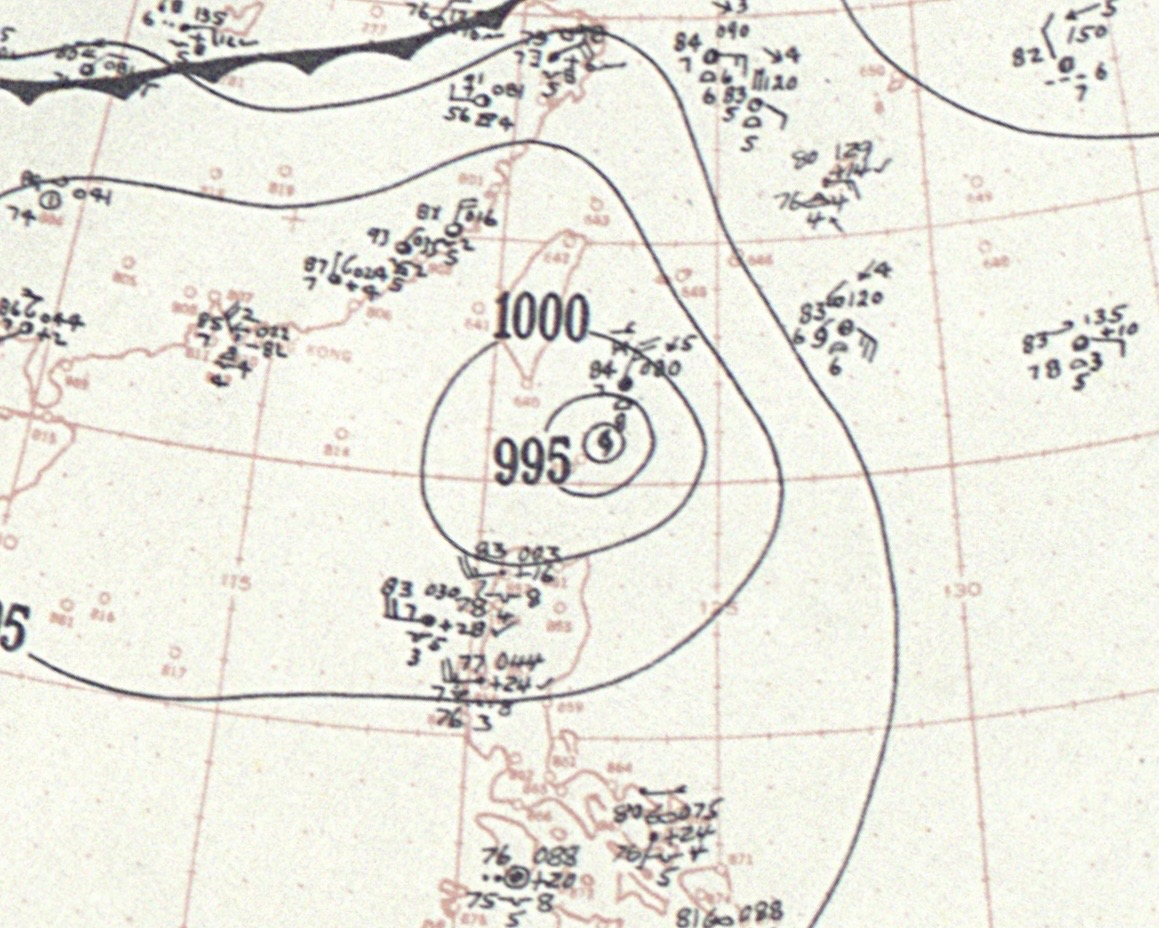
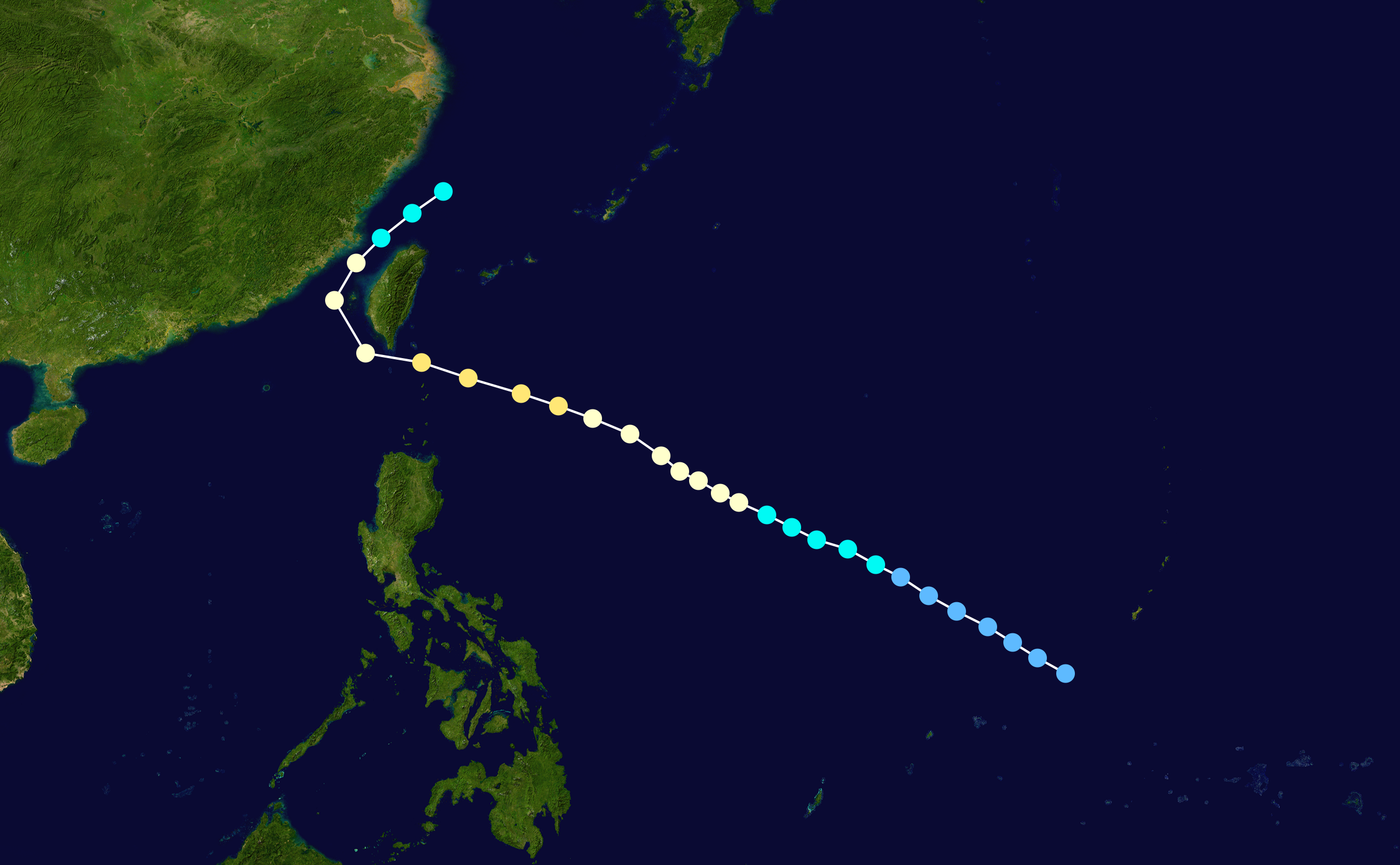
- Duration: September 25 – October 2
- Peak intensity: 165 km/h (105 mph) (1-min); 963 hPa (mbar)

On 30 September the storm was located between the Philippines and Okinawa with winds between 210 and 260 kilometres per hour (130 and 160 mph) and waves up to 30 metres (100 ft). On October 1, a United States Air Force PB4Y-2 aircraft went down during a flight into the typhoon, killing all seven crew members aboard.

=== Tropical Storm Kate ===
- Tropical storm (SSHWS)
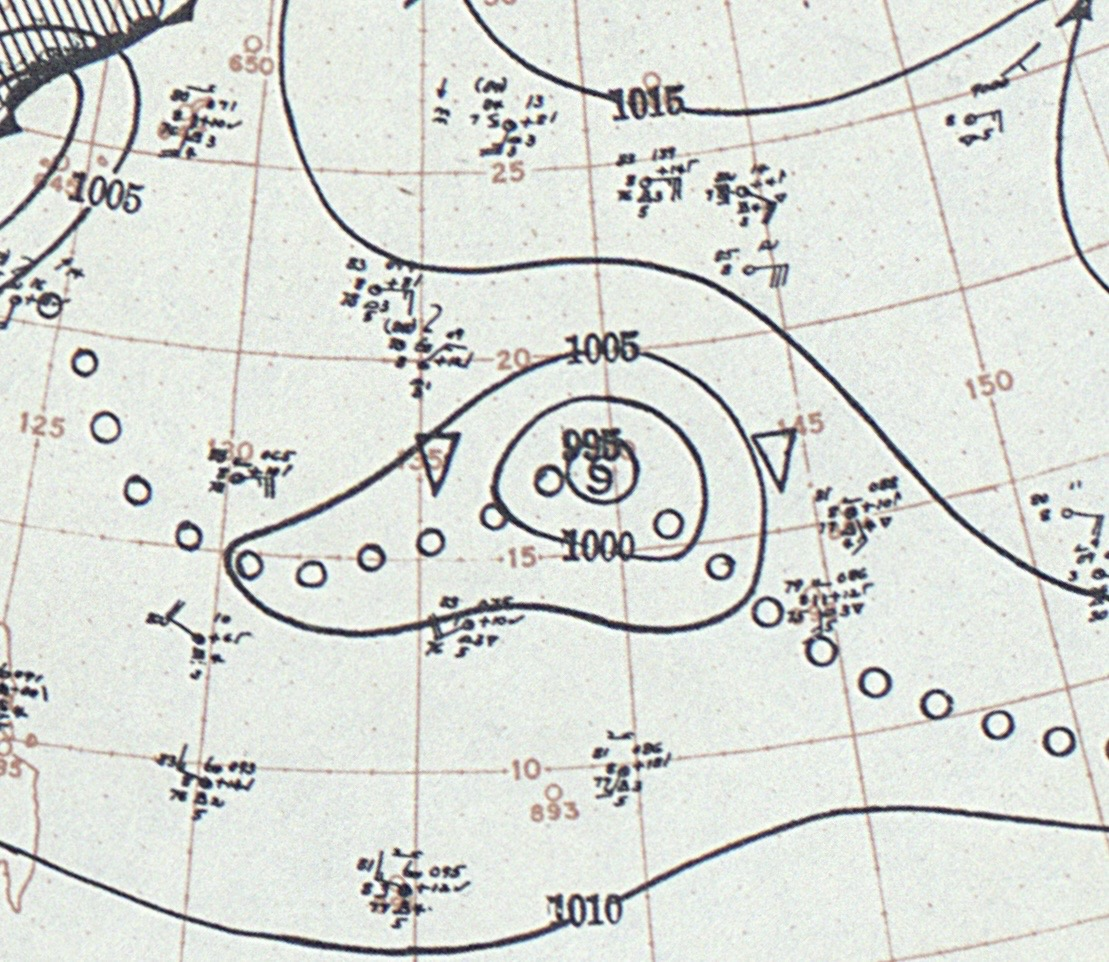
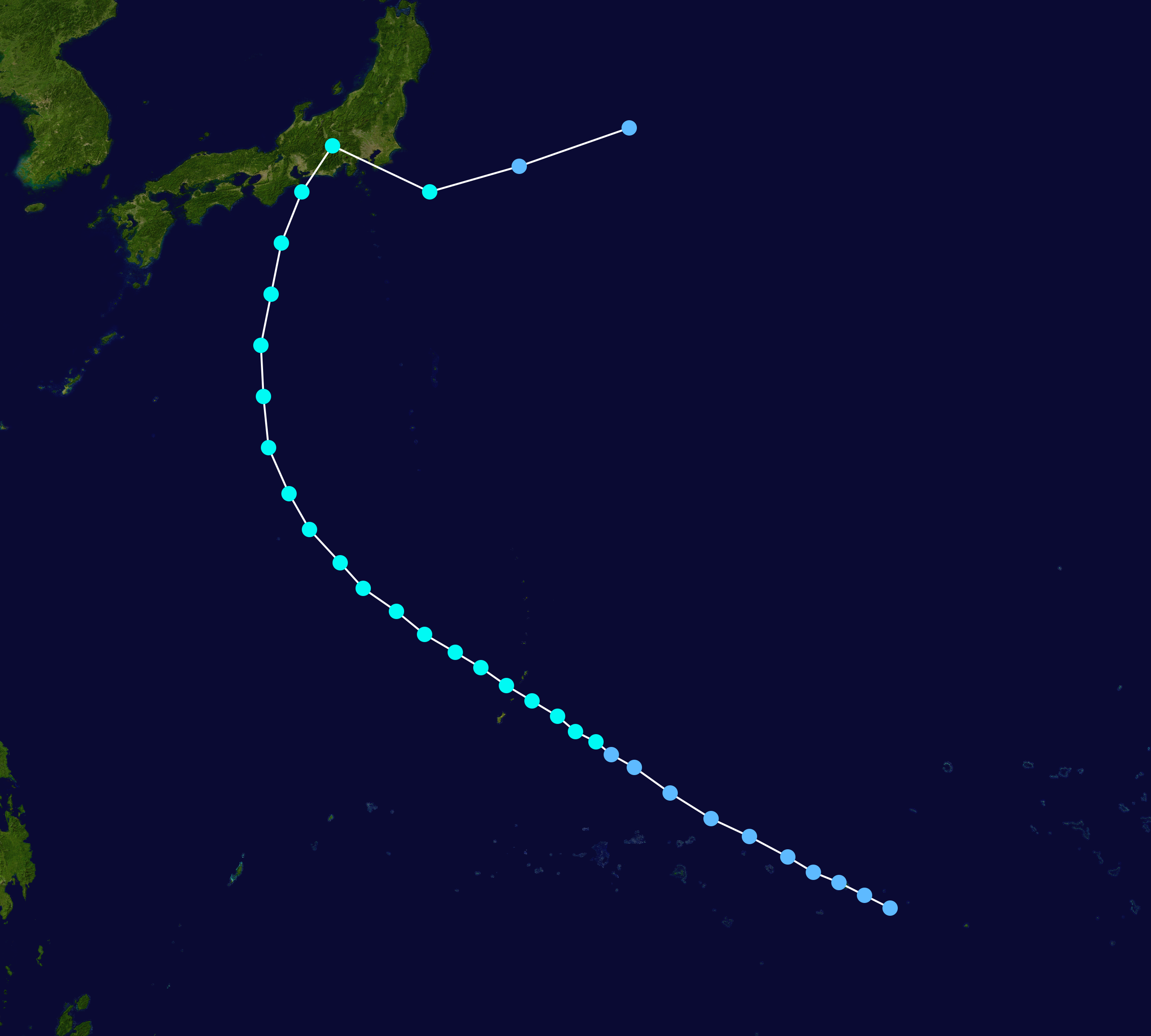
- Duration: September 28 – October 6
- Peak intensity: 110 km/h (70 mph) (1-min); 980 hPa (mbar)

Kate existed from September 28 to October 6.

=== Typhoon Louise ===
- Category 1 typhoon (SSHWS)
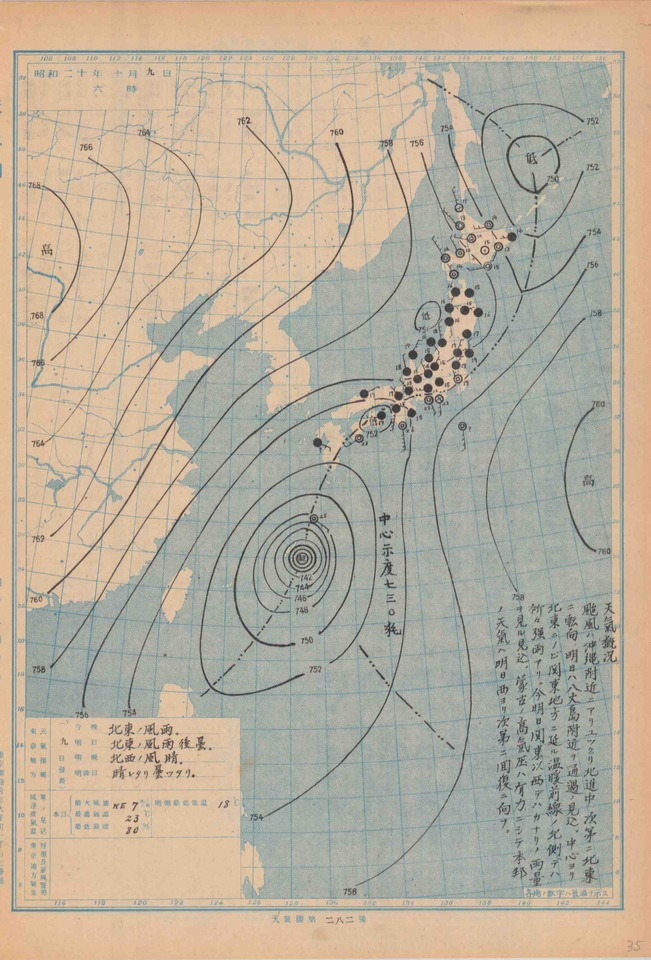
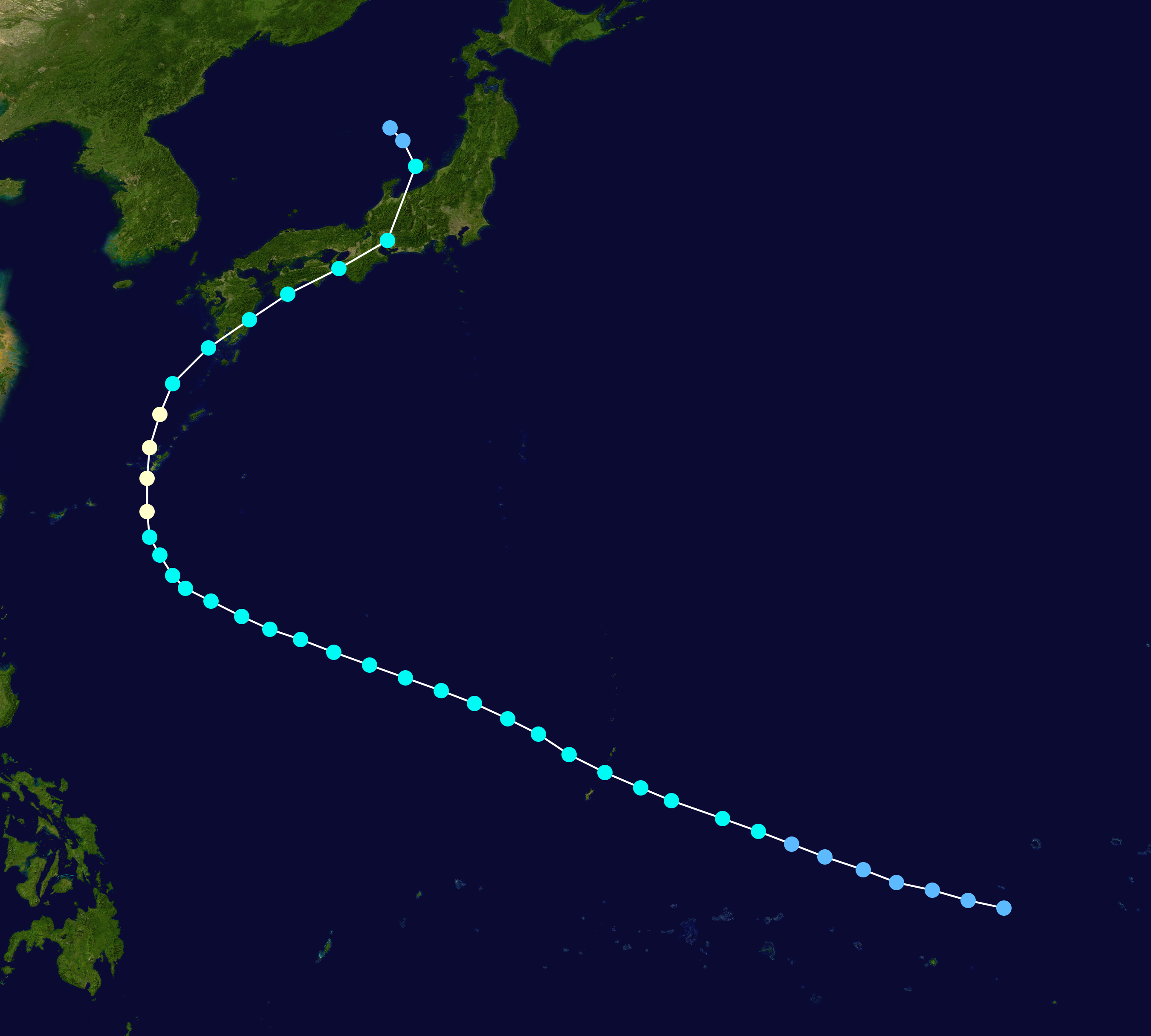
- Duration: October 2 – October 12
- Peak intensity: 120 km/h (75 mph) (1-min); 969 hPa (mbar)

Louise was first seen developing on October 2, 1945, in the Caroline Islands. It unexpectedly veered north and slowed down, only to intensify as it passed over Okinawa on October 9 with 140 km/h (90 mph) wind gusts and a minimum central pressure of 968.5 mbar. Shortly after, Louise began to weaken, and hit Japan as a strong tropical storm. The tropical cyclone became extratropical shortly after on October 12. In Okinawa, 36 people died, 47 people were reported missing, and 100 people were seriously injured.

In Buckner Bay, where the United States military were occupying a temporary base, 9.1 to 10.7 m (30 to 35 ft) waves were reported to have crashed ashore, tearing into Quonset huts and other buildings. At the time, Buckner Bay was being used as a port by the United States military. Fifteen merchant ships were driven ashore, with a few wrecked. Three United States Navy destroyers were grounded and declared beyond salvage. Over 200 other US military vessels, including six tank landing ships, a number of special purpose boats, patrol boats, and amphibious landing craft were grounded, severely damaged, or wrecked beyond repair. Eighty percent of the buildings in the bay were completely wiped out, while all 60 aircraft at the local airports were damaged.

=== Tropical Storm Marge ===
- Tropical storm (SSHWS)
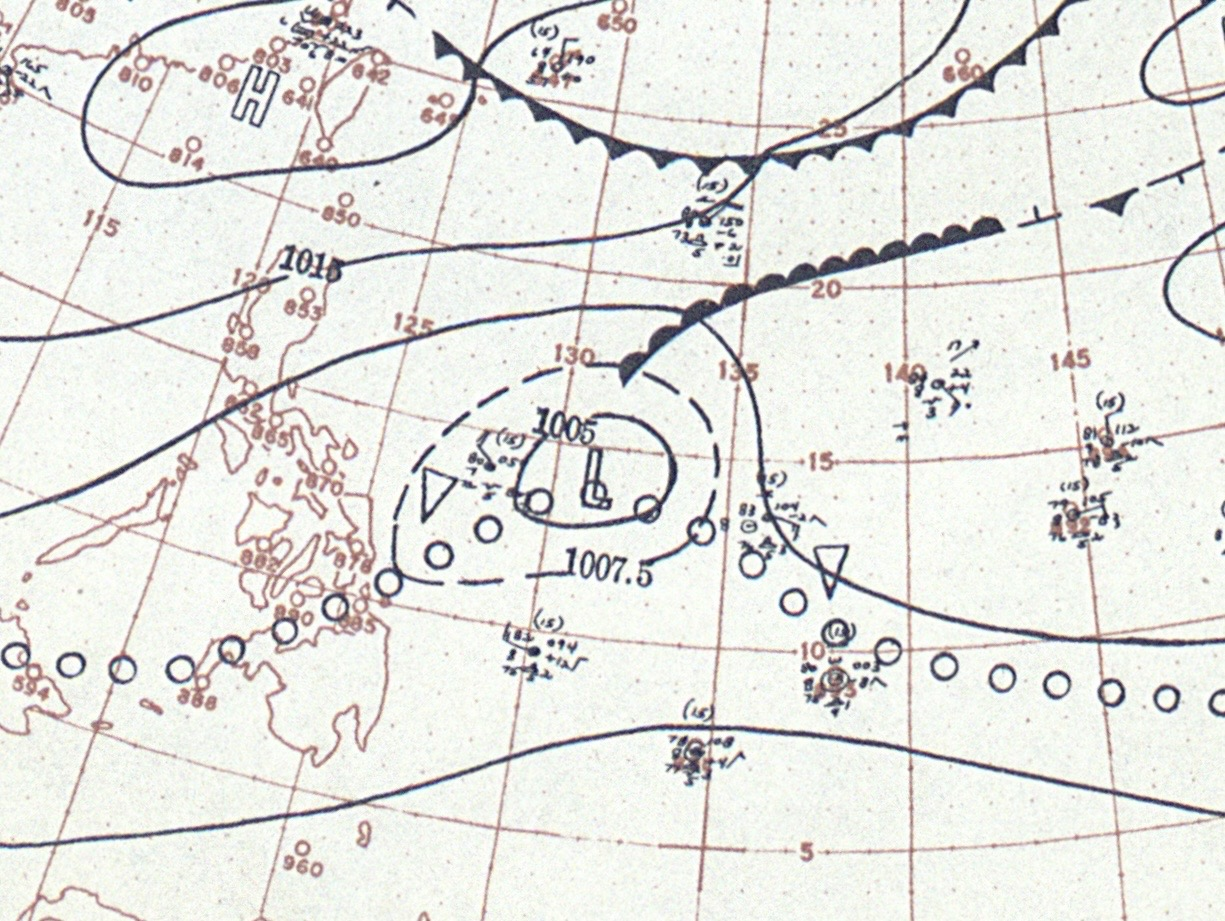
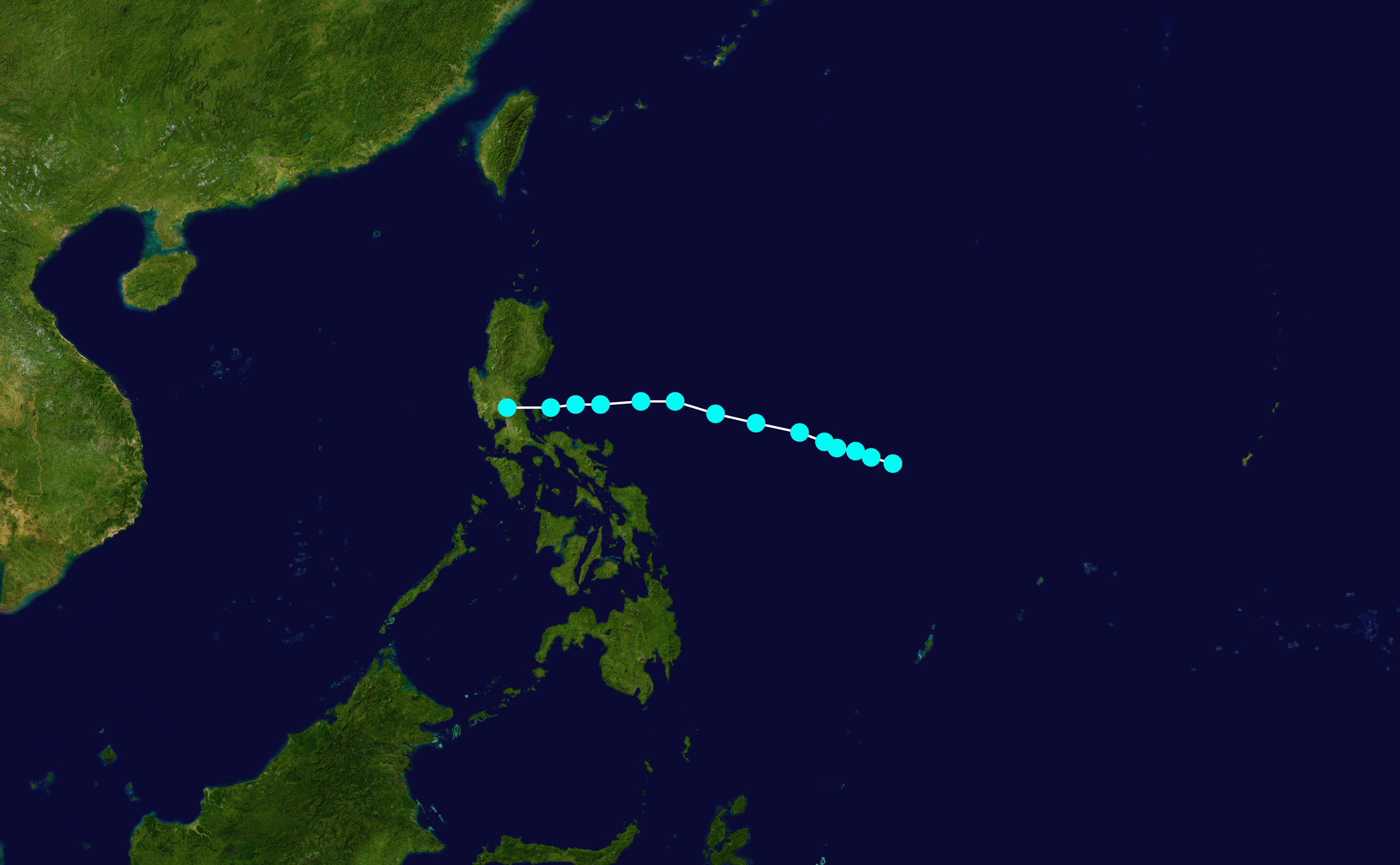
- Duration: November 1 – November 4
- Peak intensity: 85 km/h (50 mph) (1-min); 996 hPa (mbar)

A tropical storm was tracked on November 1 to the northwest of the Marianas. It moved to the west, before making landfall on Tayabas (now Quezon) in the Philippines. It was last noted on November 4 over modern-day Aurora Province. The damage is unknown.

=== Tropical Storm Yvonne ===
- Tropical storm (SSHWS)
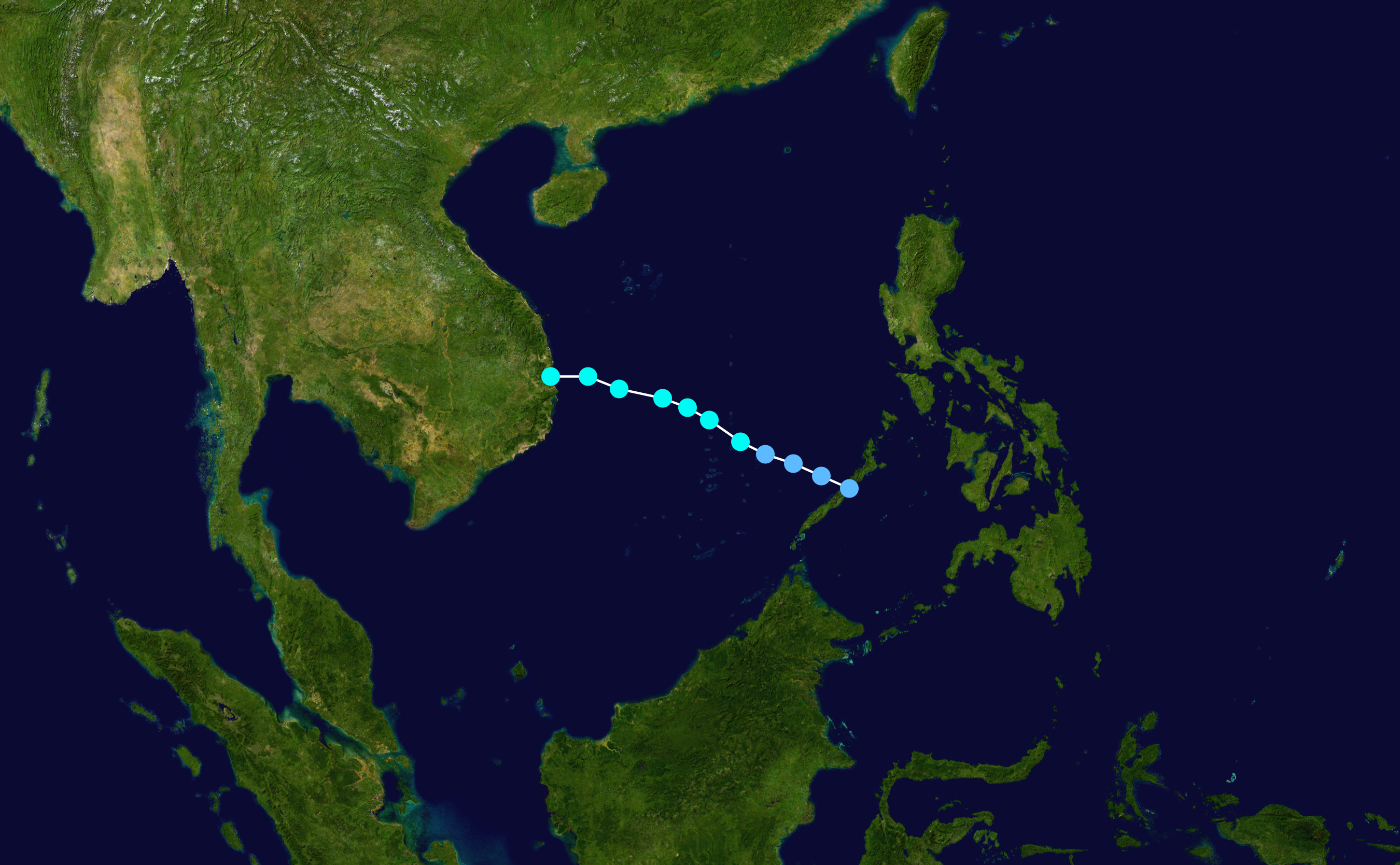
- Duration: November 14 – November 17
- Peak intensity: 75 km/h (45 mph) (1-min); 999 hPa (mbar)

Yvonne existed from November 14 to November 17.

=== Typhoon Nora ===
- Category 1 typhoon (SSHWS)
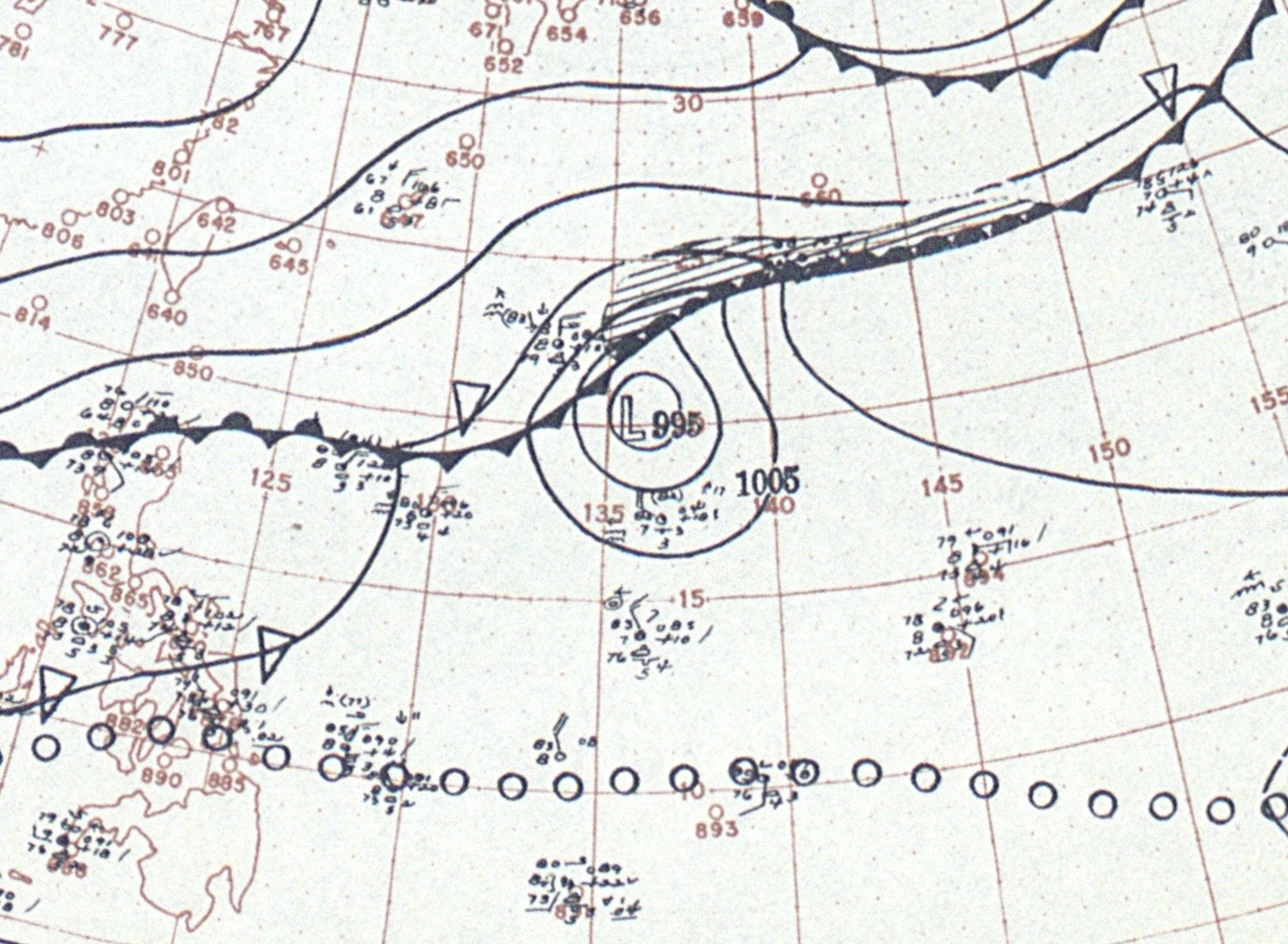
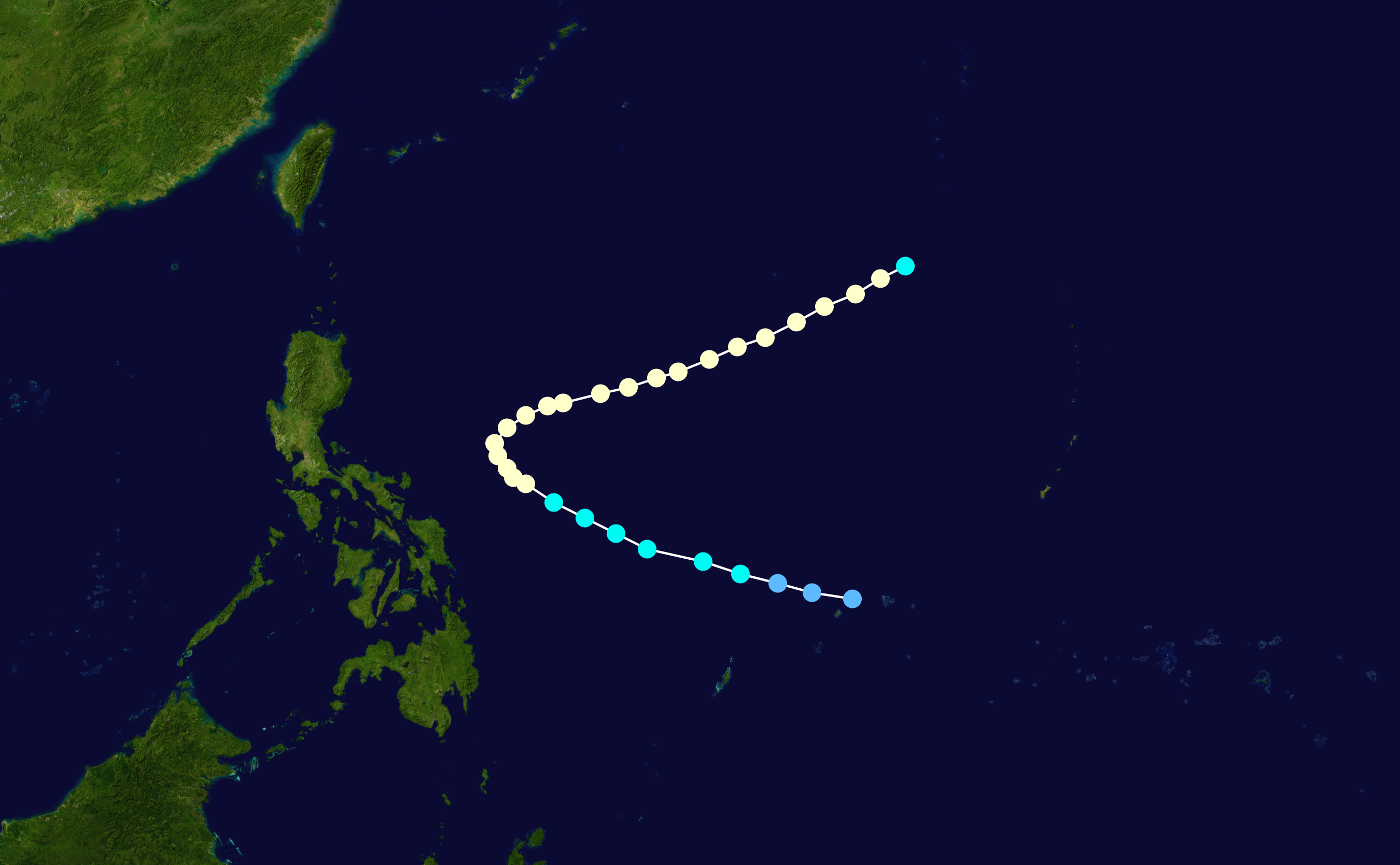
- Duration: November 22 – December 2
- Peak intensity: 150 km/h (90 mph) (1-min); 971 hPa (mbar)

Typhoon Nora formed on November 22, 1945, and began to move towards the Philippines. It became a typhoon and a category 1 equivalent storm on the SSHWS scale. The slow-moving storm moved towards the Philippines, but it turned northeast at the last moment, moving over colder waters and dissipating.

== Storm names ==
- Ann
- Betty
- Connie
- Doris
- Nancy
- Opal
- Peggy
- Edna
- Eva
- Queenie
- Frances
- Grace
- Ruth
- Susan
- Tess
- Helen
- Ursula
- Ida
- Verna
- Wanda
- Jean
- Kate
- Louise
- Marge
- Yvonne
- Nora

== See also ==
- 1945 Atlantic hurricane season
- Pacific typhoon season
- 1900–1950 South-West Indian Ocean cyclone seasons
- 1940s Australian region cyclone seasons
- 1940s South Pacific cyclone seasons

== Bibliography ==
- Anderson, Richard M.; Beyer, Edward F.; Grobmeier, Alvin H.; McCormick, Conrad R.; Silverstone, Paul H. (1990). "Question 21/89". Warship International. XXVII (2): 204–205. ISSN 0043-0374.
- Grobmeier, Alvin H. (1991). "Question 21/89". Warship International. XXVIII (2): 205. ISSN 0043-0374.
