= Casablanca-class escort carrier =

Aircraft carrier class of the US Navy

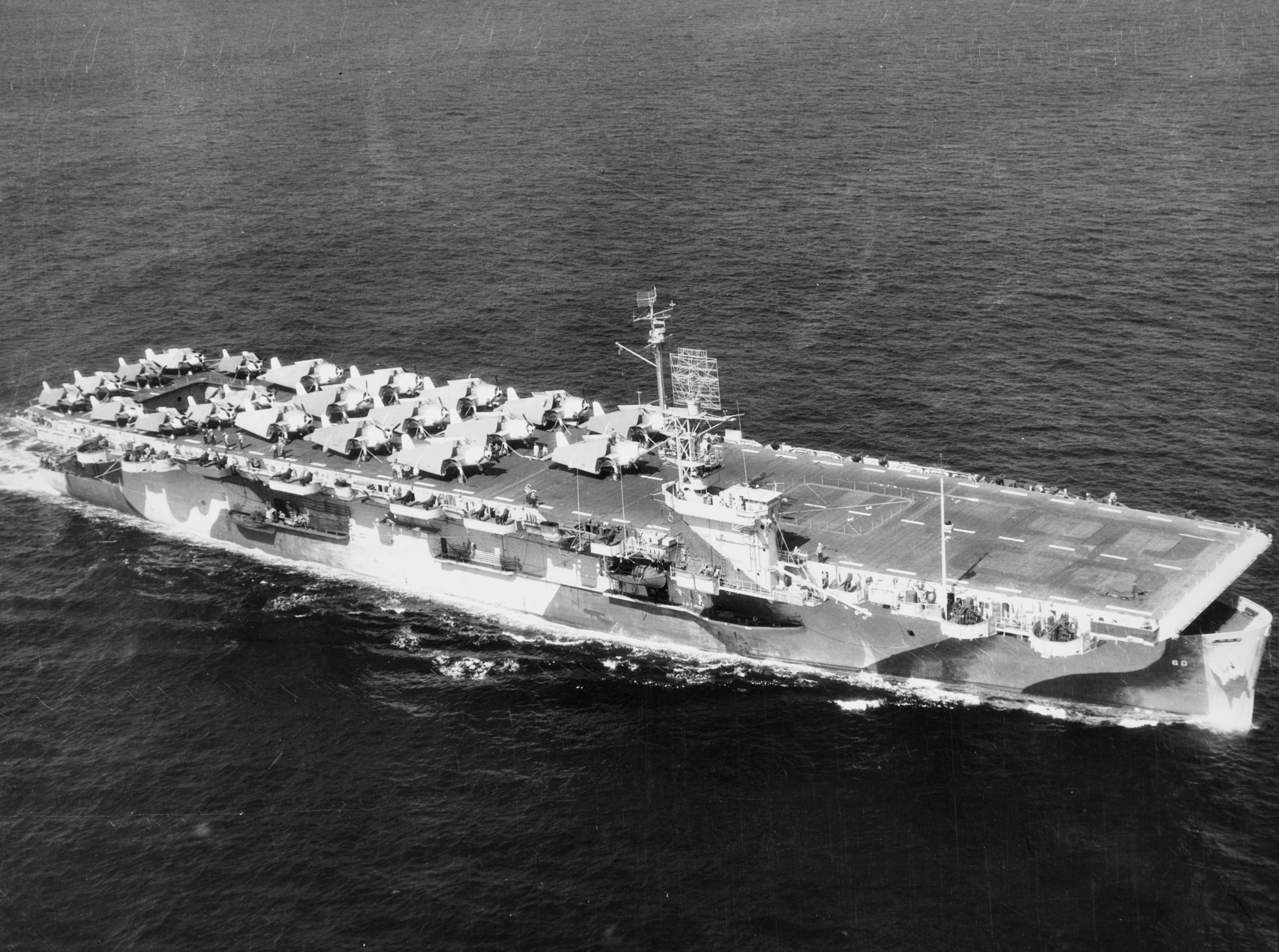
- USS Guadalcanal, 1944

Class overview
- Name: Casablanca class
- Preceded by: Sangamon class
- Succeeded by: Commencement Bay class
- Subclasses: S4-S2-BB3
- In commission: 1943–1964
- Planned: 50
- Completed: 50
- Lost: 5
- Retired: 45

General characteristics
- Type: Escort carrier
- Displacement: 8,188 long tons (8,319 t) (standard); 10,902 long tons (11,077 t) (full load)
- Length: 512 ft 3 in (156.13 m) (oa); 490 ft (150 m) (wl); 474 ft (144 m) (fd)
- Beam: 65 ft 2 in (19.86 m); 108 ft (33 m) (extreme width)
- Draft: 20 ft 9 in (6.32 m) (max)
- Installed power: 4 × Babcock & Wilcox boilers; 9,000 shp (6,700 kW)
- Propulsion: 2 × Skinner Unaflow reciprocating steam engines; 2 × screws
- Speed: 19 knots (35 km/h; 22 mph)
- Range: 10,240 nmi (18,960 km; 11,780 mi) at 15 kn (28 km/h; 17 mph)
- Complement: Total: 910 – 916 officers and men; Embarked Squadron: 50 – 56; Ship's Crew: 860
- Sensors & processing systems: 1 × SG radar, 1 × SK radar
- Armament: As designed: 1 × 5 in (127 mm)/38 cal dual-purpose gun; 4 × twin 40 mm (1.57 in) Bofors anti-aircraft guns; 12 × 20 mm (0.79 in) Oerlikon anti-aircraft cannons; Varied, ultimate armament: 1 × 5 in (127 mm)/38 cal dual-purpose gun; 8 × twin 40 mm (1.57 in) Bofors anti-aircraft guns; 20 × 20 mm (0.79 in) Oerlikon anti-aircraft cannons
- Aircraft carried: 27
- Aviation facilities: 1 × catapult; 2 × elevators

The Casablanca class was a class of escort aircraft carrier constructed for the United States Navy during World War II. They are the most numerous class of aircraft carrier ever built. Fifty were laid down, launched, and commissioned within less than two years, between 3 November 1942 and 8 July 1944. None of these ships survives today; five were lost to enemy action during World War II and the remainder were scrapped.

The Casablancas were the first escort carriers whose hulls were designed from the outset to be carriers, rather than adaptations of freighter or tanker hulls. These ships had larger flight decks and hangars than the earlier Bogue class vessels. Because they were not intended to engage in pitched combat against enemy forces their armor protection was limited to splinter plating. Despite their small size they proved useful for transporting aircraft, including aircraft types that were too large to operate from their decks. Their hull numbers were assigned consecutively, from CVE-55 Casablanca to CVE-104 Munda.

Originally, half of these ships were to have been transferred to the Royal Navy under Lend-Lease; however, to keep British insistence that carriers destined for Royal Navy service undergo months of modification before entering service from causing delays to the fast-tracked Casablanca program, it was decided that additional Bogue-class escort carriers would be transferred instead, becoming the Ruler class, earlier Bogues delivered to the RN being the Attacker class.

The relatively small size and mass-produced origins of the class led their crews to refer to them as "Kaiser Jeeps" with varying degrees of affection.

== Background ==
A side profile of the design of Thetis Bay

The Casablanca-class escort carrier program was part of a frantic response to a military disaster that took place very soon after Germany's 11 December 1941 declaration of war against the United States. Between January and August of 1942 (what German submariners referred to as the Second Happy Time) more than 600 merchant vessels, with a total cargo capacity of c. 3.1 million tons, were sunk in the western Atlantic, particularly along America's Eastern Seaboard. Early escort carriers were already proving their worth by that time, and contracts were already in place for the delivery of 24 additional escort carriers during 1942. President Franklin D. Roosevelt, however, believed that more were needed to help stem the loss of shipping. At this time industrialist Henry J. Kaiser entered the picture. Kaiser had already, through the application of mass production techniques to the construction of cargo ships, succeeded in reducing construction times of a new type (the Liberty ship) from more than a year to less than 90 days. He believed that, using the same techniques, he could produce a large group of small carriers in less than two years. He was able to arrange an audience with the President to give a presentation on the merits of a 20 kn (37 km/h; 23 mph) escort carrier design by the naval architecture firm Gibbs & Cox. Roosevelt was favorably impressed, and gave his approval on 8 June 1942. Kaiser hoped to get an order to produce 100 such ships, to justify the cost of adapting one of his yards to perform the task. U.S. naval authorities initially refused to approve such a program, but, under pressure from the White House, the Navy reluctantly agreed to acquire 50 ships from Kaiser.

The building program was to be overseen by the United States Maritime Commission, with the hulls to be built to merchant ship standards. Admiral Emory S. Land, head of the Maritime Commission, stated that these ships, as opposed to the preceding Bogues and the upcoming Sangamons, were to be used primarily as aircraft transports and convoy escorts; significantly, he added that

the ships were merchant vessels and not naval aircraft carriers or even aircraft escort vessels.

This helps explain the near-absence of armor protection on the resulting vessels.

== Design and Construction ==
All the Casablancas were built by the Kaiser Shipbuilding Company's Vancouver Yard on the Columbia River in Vancouver, Washington. The Vancouver yard had been built in early 1942 specifically to construct Liberty ships, but exigencies of war soon saw the yard shifted to building Landing Ship, Tanks (LSTs), and then to building the Casablancas, all before the end of the yard's first year in operation.

They were built on Maritime Commission Type S4-S2-BB3 hulls, lengthened variants of a hull design (P1-S2-L2) that had been used on only two ships, the Doyen-class attack transports; the lengthened version had been specifically designed to be mass-produced out of welded, prefabricated sections. This allowed them to be produced at unprecedented speeds; the final ship of her class, Munda, was delivered to the Navy just 101 days after the laying of her keel.

They were 512 ft 3 in (156.13 m) long overall and 490 ft (150 m) at the waterline. They had a beam of 65 ft 2 in (19.86 m) and a draft of 20 ft 9 in (6.32 m). They displaced 8,188 long tons (8,319 t) standard, which increased to 10,902 long tons (11,077 t) with a full load. To carry out flight operations, the ships had 474-foot-long, 80-foot-wide flight decks overlying 256-foot-long, 56-foot-wide hangars, with 42 by 34 foot elevators at their fore aft ends. The ships' compact size necessitated the installation of an aircraft catapult at the bow.

They were powered by four Babcock and Wilcox Express D boilers that raised 285 psi (1,970 kPa) of steam at 577 °F (303 °C). The steam generated by these boilers fed two Skinner Unaflow reciprocating steam engines, delivering 9,000 shp (6,700 kW) to two propeller shafts. This allowed them to reach speeds of 19 kn (35 km/h; 22 mph), with a cruising range of 10,200 nmi (18,900 km; 11,700 mi) at 15 kn (28 km/h; 17 mph). For armament, one 5 in (127 mm)/38 caliber dual-purpose gun was mounted on the stern. Additional antiaircraft defense was provided by eight Bofors 40 mm (1.57 in) antiaircraft guns in four twin mounts and 12 Oerlikon 20 mm (0.79 in) cannons mounted around the perimeter of the deck. By 1945, the standard armament for the Casablanca-class carriers had grown to 20 Oerlikon cannons and 16 Bofors guns. Because the ships were not expected to engage in pitched combat armor was limited to splinter protection although internal subdivision and void spaces offered some additional resistance to damage.

The sensors onboard consisted of an SG surface-search radar and an SK air-search radar. In action, the Casablanca-class carriers were intended to function with a crew of 860. A typical embarked squadron consisted of 16 Wildcat fighters and 12 Avenger torpedo bombers (usually, by this point in the war, General Motors FM and TBM models of the two types), stowed in the hangar between the two elevators.

== Naming ==
The Casablanca class initially continued the US Navy's policy of naming escort carriers after bays and sounds, in this case the numerous inlets of the Alexander Archipelago that form the southeast coastline of Alaska, though several were subsequently renamed to carry on the US Navy's tradition of naming aircraft carriers after battles. Those ships that appear to be named after islands, seas, straits, or cities actually commemorated battles fought at those locations. Several had their original "Bay" names changed to battle names while under construction, and two of them, Midway (CVE-63) and Coral Sea (CVE-57), lost their battle names midcareer to new Midway-class aircraft carriers, becoming USS St. Lo and USS Anzio, respectively. Unlike the larger Essex and Independence-class aircraft carriers, none was named to commemorate historical naval vessels.

== Production time and Navy refusal ==
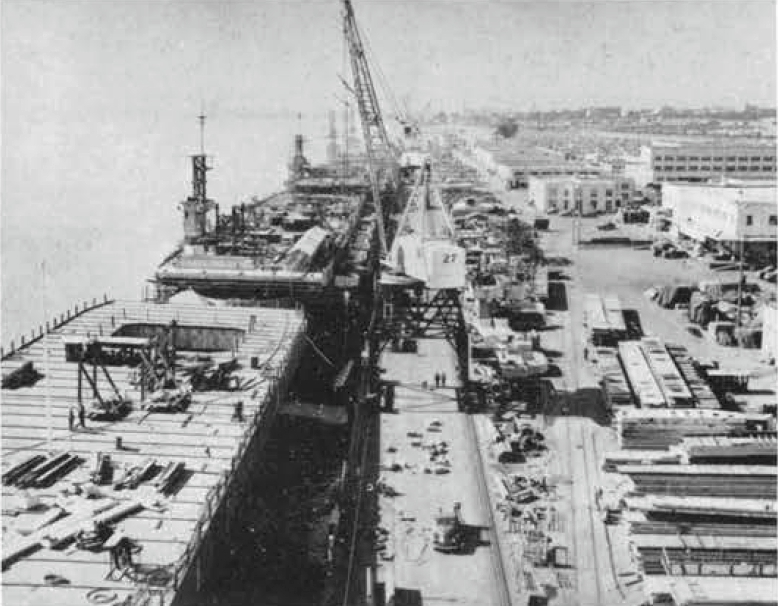
Casablanca-class escort carriers fitting out, c. April 1944

Although the Essex-class carriers already on order ended up being completed in 20 months or less, 1941 projections, based on the 38-month average construction period for pre-war carriers, suggested that none of the new fleet carriers could be expected until 1944. Henry Kaiser, in his pitch for the new escort carrier design, had emphasized his ability to get large numbers of small carriers built very quickly, and his firm rose to the challenge: while the first ship, Casablanca, took 249 days to complete, laying down to commissioning, the 25th, USS Ommaney Bay, took only 129 days, and the final ship, USS Munda, only 102. Uncertainty regarding the value of the new ships disappeared as they quickly proved their usefulness, defending convoys, providing air support for amphibious operations, and allowing fleet carriers to focus on opposing enemy air power.

== Service ==
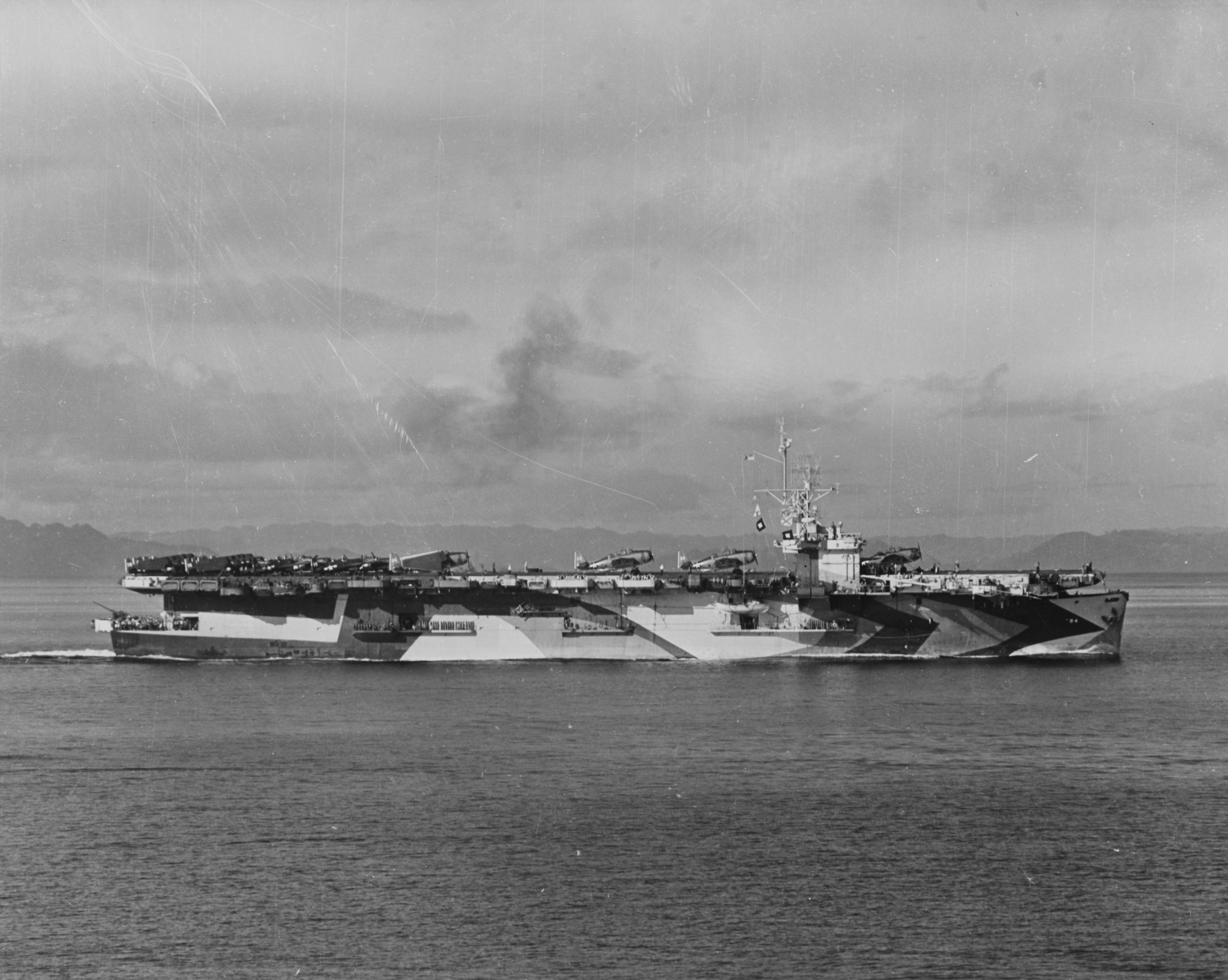
USS Lunga Point

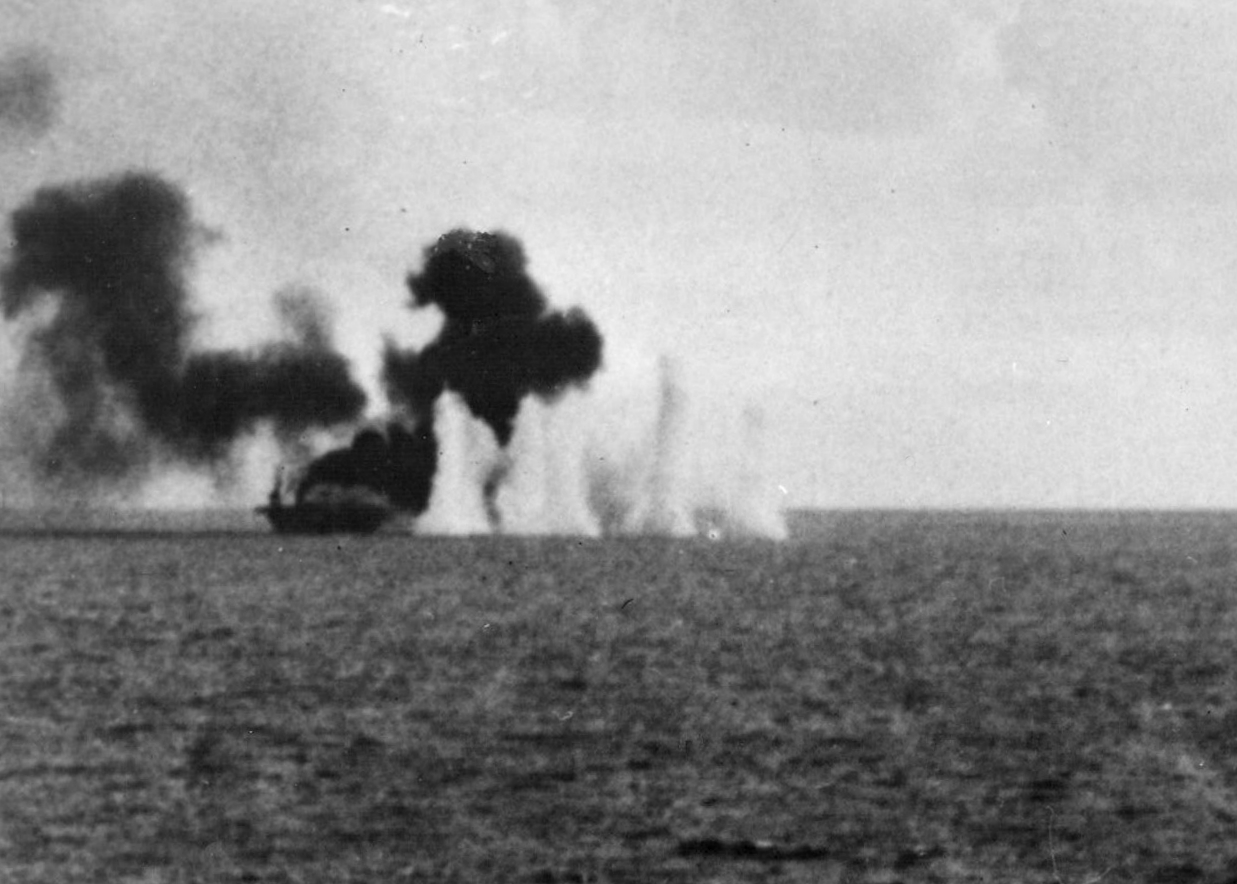
USS Gambier Bay under fire at Samar, 1944

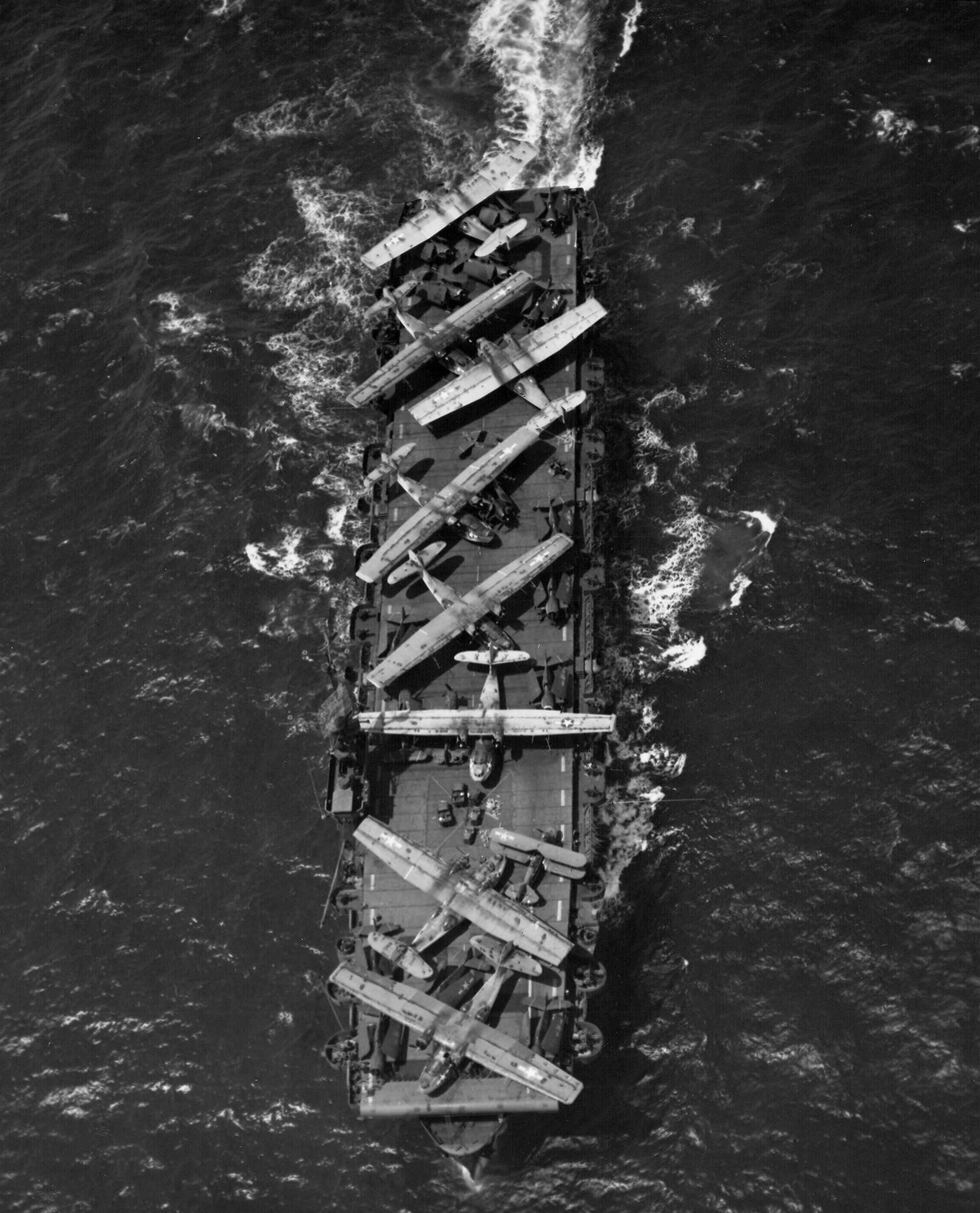
USS Thetis Bay ferrying aircraft, 1944

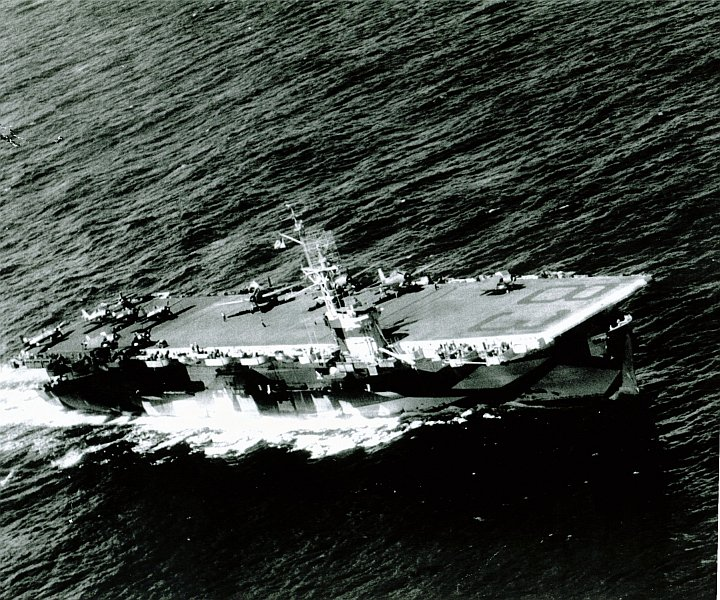
USS Sargent Bay underway, 1944

The Casablanca-class carriers began to enter service in late 1943, by which time the U-boat threat had been brought largely under control. Some did see service in the Atlantic, but most were used in the Pacific, ferrying aircraft, providing logistics support, and conducting close air support for the island-hopping campaigns. .

Their finest hour came in the Battle off Samar, when Taffy 3, a task unit composed of six of these ships and their screen of three destroyers and four destroyer escorts, gave battle against the Japanese main battle force ("Center Force"). Their desperate defense not only preserved most of their own ships, but also succeeded in turning back the massive force with only their aircraft joined by aircraft from Taffy 1 and 2 consisting of additional Casablanca-class carriers, machine guns, torpedoes, depth charges, high-explosive bombs, and their own 5-inch/38-caliber guns. Tasked with ground support and antisubmarine patrols, they lacked the torpedoes and armor-piercing bombs to tackle a surface fleet alone. Taffy 3 was to be protected by Admiral Halsey's Third Fleet with carriers and battleships, but the Third Fleet had left the scene to pursue a decoy carrier fleet, inadvertently leaving Taffy 3 the only force between the massive Japanese fleet and undefended landing forces at Leyte Gulf. The lightly armed vessels each had only one 5-inch/38 cal gun mounted aft, yet two of their number, St. Lo and Kalinin Bay, became the only US aircraft carriers to ever record a hit on an enemy warship by its own guns. St. Lo hit a Japanese destroyer with a single round and Kalinin Bay damaged a Myōkō-class cruiser with two hits. In addition, the gun crew on USS White Plains may have struck the cruiser Chōkai, with up to six 5-inch shells. One of these rounds may even have caused a large secondary explosion – probably from one of Chōkai's own torpedoes – on the starboard side that proved fatal to the heavy cruiser. White Plains's gun crew claimed to have put all six 5-inch rounds into Chōkai from a range of 11,700 yards (10,700 m), near the maximum effective range for the 5-inch/38 gun. However, Japanese sources attributed the loss of Chōkai to bomb damage from an air attack.

Another noteworthy achievement of the Casablanca class was when USS Guadalcanal, under command of Captain Daniel V. Gallery, participated in the first capture-at-sea of a foreign warship by the US Navy since the War of 1812, when a crew of volunteers from USS Pillsbury boarded U-505 after Gallery's Guadalcanal-centered hunter-killer group forced it to the surface with depth charges. Guadalcanal also earned the distinction of being the only aircraft carrier in history to conduct flight operations with a captured enemy vessel in tow.

== Notable incidents ==
Of the 11 United States aircraft carriers of all types lost during World War II, five were Casablanca-class escort carriers:

- CVE-56 Liscome Bay

Sunk 24 November 1943. Submarine torpedo launched from IJN I-175 SW off Butaritari (Makin).

- CVE-73 Gambier Bay

Sunk 25 October 1944. Concentrated surface gunfire from IJN Center Force during Battle off Samar.

- CVE-63 St. Lo (ex-Midway ex-Chapin Bay)

Sunk 25 October 1944. Kamikaze aerial attack during Battle of Leyte Gulf.

- CVE-79 Ommaney Bay

Sunk 4 January 1945. Kamikaze aerial attack in the Sulu Sea en route to Lingayen Gulf.

- CVE-95 Bismarck Sea

Sunk 21 February 1945. Kamikaze aerial attack off Iwo Jima.

== After the war ==
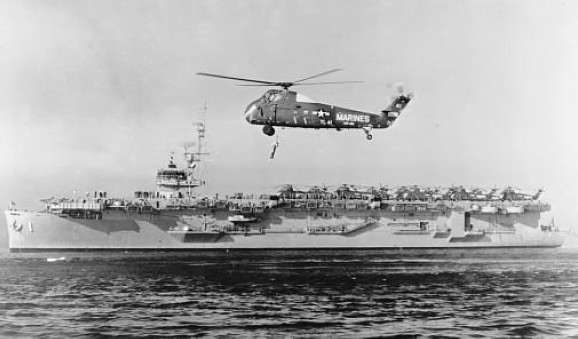
USS Thetis Bay, 1950s

Some ships were retained postwar as aircraft transports, where their lack of speed was not a major drawback. Some units were reactivated as helicopter escort carriers (CVHE and T-CVHE) or utility carriers (CVU and T-CVU) after the war, but most were deactivated and placed in reserve once the war ended. The Casablancas' future was undoubtedly limited by their propulsion system, reciprocating engines having fallen out of favor even before the war. In spite of the significant roles played by these ships, no vessels of this or any other class of escort carrier were preserved as museum ships; all surviving ships of the Casablanca class were stricken in 1958-9, and scrapped in 1959–61. One ship, USS Thetis Bay, which had been heavily modified into an amphibious assault ship (LPH-6), was not scrapped until 1966.

== Ships of the class ==
All ships of the Casablanca class were built in Vancouver, Washington, at the Kaiser Shipbuilding Company's Vancouver Shipyard. Thesee ships of the class were constructed:

List of Casablanca-class escort carriers
Ship name	Hull no.	Building Way	Laid down	Launched	Commissioned	Decommissioned	Fate
Casablanca (ex-Ameer, ex- Alazon Bay)	CVE-55	7	3 November 1942	5 April 1943	8 July 1943	10 June 1946	Sold for scrapping, 23 April 1947
Liscome Bay	CVE-56	8	12 December 1942	19 April 1943	7 August 1943	24 November 1943	Torpedoed and sunk by Japanese submarine I-175, 24 November 1943
Anzio (ex-Alikula Bay, ex-Coral Sea)	CVE-57	9	12 December 1942	1 May 1943	27 August 1943	5 August 1946	Struck, 1 March 1959, sold for scrapping, 24 November 1959
Corregidor (ex-Auguilla Bay)	CVE-58	10	17 December 1942	12 May 1943	31 August 1943	30 July 1946	Sold for scrapping, 28 April 1959
Corregidor (ex-Auguilla Bay)	CVE-58	10	17 December 1942	12 May 1943	19 May 1951	4 September 1958	Sold for scrapping, 28 April 1959
Mission Bay	CVE-59	11	28 December 1942	26 May 1943	13 September 1943	21 February 1947	Sold for scrapping, 30 April 1959
Guadalcanal (ex-Astrolabe Bay)	CVE-60	12	5 January 1943	5 June 1943	25 September 1943	15 July 1946	Struck, 27 May 1958, sold for scrapping, 2 September 1959
Manila Bay (ex-Bucareli Bay)	CVE-61	1	15 January 1943	10 July 1943	5 October 1943	31 July 1946	Struck, 27 May 1958, sold for scrapping, 2 September 1959
Natoma Bay	CVE-62	2	17 January 1943	20 July 1943	14 October 1943	20 May 1946	Struck, 1 September 1958, sold for scrapping, 30 July 1959
St. Lo (ex-Chapin Bay, ex-Midway)	CVE-63	3	23 January 1943	17 August 1943	23 October 1943	25 October 1944	Sunk by kamikaze aircraft, 25 October 1944, during the Battle of Leyte
Tripoli (ex-Didrickson Bay)	CVE-64	4	1 February 1943	13 July 1943	31 October 1943	22 May 1946	Struck, 1 February 1959, sold for scrapping, January 1960
Tripoli (ex-Didrickson Bay)	CVE-64	4	1 February 1943	13 July 1943	5 January 1952	25 November 1958	Struck, 1 February 1959, sold for scrapping, January 1960
Wake Island (ex-Dolomi Bay)	CVE-65	5	6 February 1943	15 September 1943	7 November 1943	5 April 1946	Struck, 17 April 1946, sold for scrapping, 19 April 1946
White Plains (ex-Elbour Bay)	CVE-66	6	11 February 1943	27 September 1943	15 November 1943	10 July 1946	Struck, 1 July 1958, sold for scrapping, 29 July 1958
Solomons (ex-Emperor, ex-Nassuk Bay)	CVE-67	7	19 March 1943	6 October 1943	21 November 1943	5 June 1946	Sold for scrapping, 22 December 1946
Kalinin Bay	CVE-68	8	26 April 1943	15 October 1943	27 November 1943	15 May 1946	Sold for scrapping, 8 December 1946
Kasaan Bay	CVE-69	9	11 May 1943	24 October 1943	4 December 1943	5 June 1946	Sold for scrapping, 2 February 1960
Fanshaw Bay	CVE-70	10	18 May 1943	1 November 1943	9 December 1943	14 August 1946	Struck, 1 March 1959, sold for scrapping, 2 February 1960
Kitkun Bay	CVE-71	11	18 June 1943	8 November 1943	15 December 1943	19 April 1946	Sold for scrapping, 18 November 1946
Tulagi (ex-Fortazela Bay)	CVE-72	12	7 June 1943	15 November 1943	21 December 1943	30 April 1946	Struck, 8 May 1946
Gambier Bay	CVE-73	1	10 July 1943	22 November 1943	28 December 1943	27 November 1944	Sunk, 25 October 1944, in the Battle off Samar
Nehenta Bay	CVE-74	2	20 July 1943	28 November 1943	3 January 1944	15 May 1946	Struck 1 April 1960, sold for scrapping, 29 June 1960
Hoggatt Bay	CVE-75	3	17 August 1943	4 December 1943	11 January 1944	20 July 1946	Struck 1 April 1960, sold for scrapping, 31 March 1960
Kadashan Bay	CVE-76	4	2 September 1943	11 December 1943	18 January 1944	14 June 1946	Struck 1 August 1959, sold for scrapping, February 1960
Marcus Island (ex-Kanalku Bay)	CVE-77	5	15 September 1943	16 November 1943	26 January 1944	12 December 1946	Sold for scrapping, 29 February 1960
Savo Island (ex-Kaita Bay)	CVE-78	6	27 September 1943	22 December 1943	3 February 1944	12 December 1946	Struck 1 September 1959, sold for scrapping, 29 February 1960
Ommaney Bay	CVE-79	7	6 October 1943	29 December 1943	11 February 1944	4 January 1945	Damaged by kamikaze aircraft and scuttled, 4 January 1945
Petrof Bay	CVE-80	8	15 October 1943	5 January 1944	18 February 1944	31 July 1955	Struck 27 June 1958, sold for scrapping, 30 July 1959
Rudyerd Bay	CVE-81	9	24 October 1943	12 January 1944	25 February 1944	11 June 1946	Struck 1 August 1959, sold for scrapping, January 1960
Saginaw Bay	CVE-82	10	1 November 1943	19 January 1944	2 March 1944	19 June 1946	Struck 1 March 1959, sold for scrapping, 27 November 1959
Sargent Bay	CVE-83	11	8 November 1943	31 January 1944	9 March 1944	23 June 1946	Struck 27 June 1958, sold for scrapping, July 1959
Shamrock Bay	CVE-84	12	15 November 1943	4 February 1944	15 March 1944	6 July 1946	Struck 27 June 1958, sold for scrapping, May 1958
Shipley Bay	CVE-85	1	22 November 1943	12 February 1944	21 March 1944	28 June 1946	Struck 1 March 1959, sold for scrapping, 2 October 1959
Sitkoh Bay	CVE-86	2	23 November 1943	19 February 1944	28 March 1944	30 November 1946	Struck 1 April 1960, sold for scrapping, 30 August 1960
Sitkoh Bay	CVE-86	2	23 November 1943	19 February 1944	29 July 1950	27 July 1954	Struck 1 April 1960, sold for scrapping, 30 August 1960
Steamer Bay	CVE-87	3	4 December 1943	26 February 1944	4 April 1944	4 February 1946	Struck 1 March 1959, sold for scrapping, 29 August 1959
Cape Esperance (ex-Tananek Bay)	CVE-88	4	11 December 1943	3 March 1944	9 April 1944	22 August 1946	Sold for scrapping, 14 May 1959
Cape Esperance (ex-Tananek Bay)	CVE-88	4	11 December 1943	3 March 1944	5 August 1950	15 January 1959	Sold for scrapping, 14 May 1959
Takanis Bay	CVE-89	5	16 December 1943	10 March 1944	15 April 1944	18 June 1946	Struck 1 March 1959, sold for scrapping, 29 June 1960
Thetis Bay	CVE-90	6	22 December 1943	16 March 1944	12 April 1944	7 August 1946	Struck 1 August 1959, sold for scrapping, December 1964
Thetis Bay	CVE-90	6	22 December 1943	16 March 1944	20 July 1956	1 March 1964	Struck 1 August 1959, sold for scrapping, December 1964
Makassar Strait	CVE-91	7	29 December 1943	22 March 1944	27 April 1944	9 August 1946	Struck 1 September 1958, grounded and used as a target, April 1961
Windham Bay	CVE-92	8	5 January 1944	29 March 1944	3 May 1944	23 August 1946	Struck 1 February 1959, sold for scrapping, 31 December 1960
Windham Bay	CVE-92	8	5 January 1944	29 March 1944	28 October 1950	15 January 1959	Struck 1 February 1959, sold for scrapping, 31 December 1960
Makin Island	CVE-93	9	12 January 1944	5 April 1944	9 May 1944	19 April 1946	Struck 11 July 1946, sold for scrapping, 1 January 1947
Lunga Point (ex-Alazon Bay)	CVE-94	10	19 January 1944	11 April 1944	14 May 1944	24 October 1946	Struck 1 April 1960, sold for scrapping, 3 August 1960
Bismarck Sea (ex-Alikula Bay)	CVE-95	11	31 January 1944	17 April 1944	20 May 1944	30 March 1945	Sunk during the Battle of Iwo Jima, 21 February 1945
Salamaua (ex-Anguilla Bay)	CVE-96	12	4 February 1944	22 April 1944	26 May 1944	9 May 1946	Struck 21 May 1946, sold for scrapping, 18 November 1946
Hollandia (ex-Astrolabe Bay)	CVE-97	1	12 February 1944	28 April 1944	1 June 1944	17 January 1947	Struck 1 April 1960, sold for scrapping, 31 December 1960
Kwajalein (ex-Bucareli Bay)	CVE-98	2	19 February 1944	4 May 1944	7 June 1944	16 August 1946	Struck 1 April 1960, sold for scrapping
Admiralty Islands (ex-Chaplin Bay)	CVE-99	3	26 February 1944	10 May 1944	13 June 1944	24 April 1946	Struck 8 May 1946, sold for scrapping, 2 January 1947
Bougainville	CVE-100	4	3 March 1944	16 May 1944	18 June 1944	3 November 1946	Struck 1 May 1960, sold for scrapping, 29 August 1960
Matanikau (ex-Dolomi Bay)	CVE-101	5	10 March 1944	22 May 1944	24 June 1944	11 October 1946	Struck 1 April 1960, sold for scrapping, 27 July 1960
Attu (ex-Elbour Bay)	CVE-102	6	16 March 1944	27 May 1944	30 June 1944	8 June 1946	Struck 3 July 1946, sold for scrapping, 3 January 1947
Roi (ex-Alava Bay)	CVE-103	7	22 March 1944	2 June 1944	6 July 1944	9 May 1946	Struck 21 May 1946, sold for scrapping, 31 December 1946
Munda (ex-Tonowek Bay)	CVE-104	8	29 March 1944	27 May 1944	8 July 1944	24 April 1946	Struck 1 September 1958, sold for scrapping, 17 June 1960

== See also ==
- List of ship classes of World War II

== Sources ==
- Adcock, Al (1996), Escort Carriers in Action – Warships No. 9, Carrollton, Texas: Squadron/Signal Publications, ISBN 0897473566
- Baker, Arthur D. III (April 2007). "'Jeeps for the Fleet'". Naval History. 21 (2).
- Foster, Mark S. (2014), Henry J. Kaiser: Builder in the Modern American West, Austin, Texas: University of Texas Press, ISBN 9780292736450
- Friedman, Norman (1980), "United States of America", in Chesneau, Roger; Gardiner, Robert (eds.), Conway's All the World's Fighting Ships 1922–1946, London, England: Conway Maritime Press, ISBN 0870219138
- Friedman, Norman (1983), U.S. Aircraft Carriers: An Illustrated Design History, Annapolis, Maryland: Naval Institute Press, ISBN 0870217399
- Poolman, Kenneth (1989), Escort Carriers of World War Two, London, England: Arms and Armour Press, ISBN 9780853689522
- Ross, Al (1993), The Escort Carrier Gambier Bay, Anatomy of the Ship, London, England: Conway Maritime Press, ISBN 9781557502353
- Y'Blood, William T. (2012), Hunter-Killer: U.S. Escort Carriers in the Battle of the Atlantic, Annapolis, Maryland: Naval Institute Press, ISBN 9781591149958
- Y'Blood, William T. (2012), The Little Giants: U.S. Escort Carriers Against Japan, Annapolis, Maryland: Naval Institute Press, ISBN 9781612512471
