= USS Matanikau =

Casablanca-class escort carrier of the US Navy

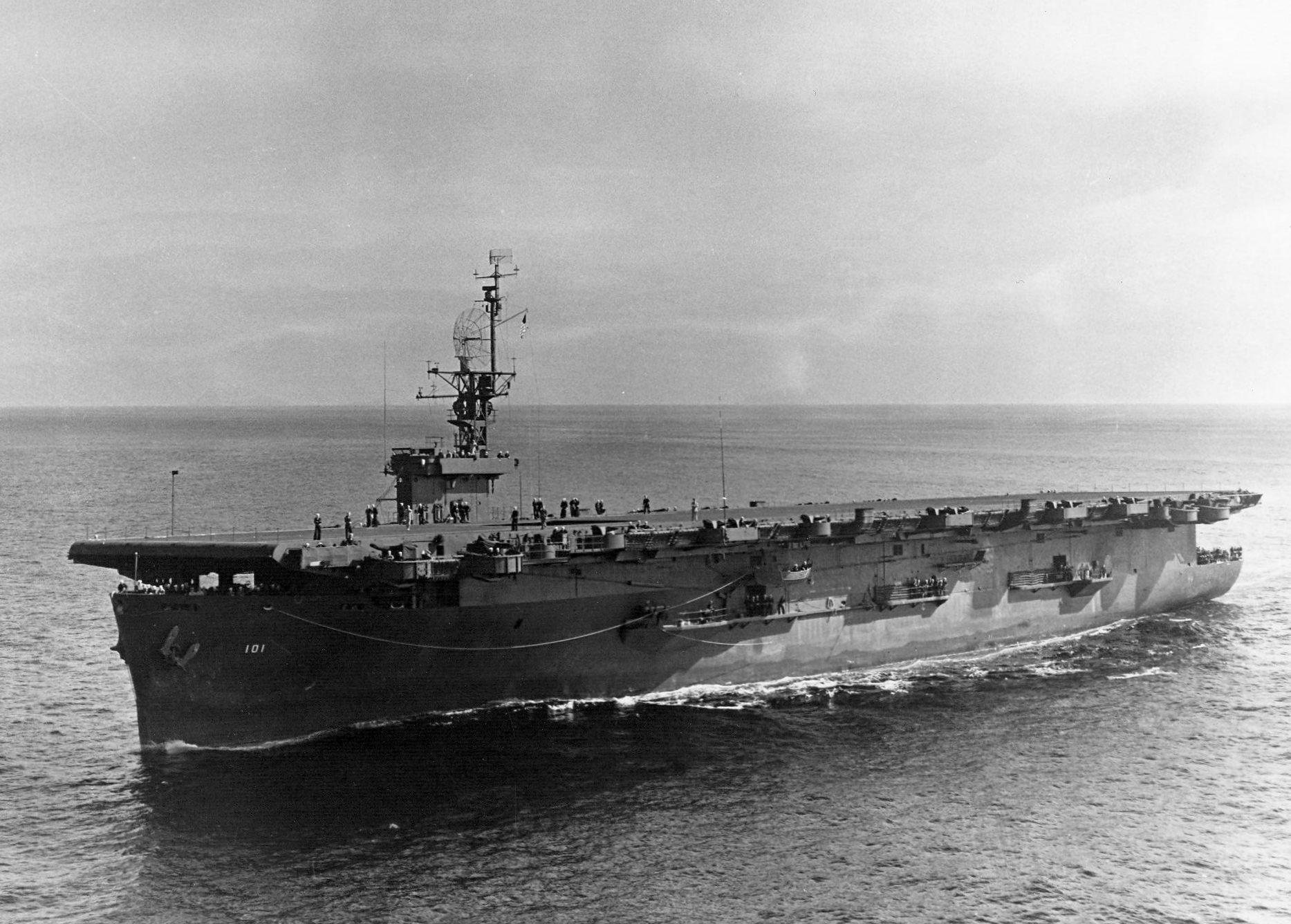
- USS Matanikau underway, July 1944

History

United States
- Name: Dolomi Bay; Matanikau
- Namesake: Dolomi Bay, Prince of Wales Island; Actions along the Matanikau
- Ordered: as a Type S4-S2-BB3 hull, MCE hull 1138
- Awarded: 18 June 1942
- Builder: Kaiser Shipyards
- Laid down: 10 March 1944
- Launched: 22 May 1944
- Commissioned: 24 June 1944
- Decommissioned: 11 October 1946
- Stricken: 1 April 1960
- Identification: Hull symbol: CVE-101
- Fate: Sold for scrap, 27 July 1960

General characteristics
- Class & type: Casablanca-class escort carrier
- Displacement: 8,188 long tons (8,319 t) (standard); 10,902 long tons (11,077 t) (full load)
- Length: 512 ft 3 in (156.13 m) (oa); 490 ft (150 m) (wl); 474 ft (144 m) (fd)
- Beam: 65 ft 2 in (19.86 m); 108 ft (33 m) (extreme width)
- Draft: 20 ft 9 in (6.32 m) (max)
- Installed power: 4 × Babcock & Wilcox boilers; 9,000 shp (6,700 kW)
- Propulsion: 2 × Skinner Unaflow reciprocating steam engines; 2 × screws
- Speed: 19 knots (35 km/h; 22 mph)
- Range: 10,240 nmi (18,960 km; 11,780 mi) at 15 kn (28 km/h; 17 mph)
- Complement: Total: 910 – 916 officers and men; Embarked Squadron: 50 – 56; Ship's Crew: 860
- Armament: As designed: 1 × 5 in (127 mm)/38 cal dual-purpose gun; 4 × twin 40 mm (1.57 in) Bofors anti-aircraft guns; 12 × 20 mm (0.79 in) Oerlikon anti-aircraft cannons; Varied, ultimate armament: 1 × 5 in (127 mm)/38 cal dual-purpose gun; 8 × twin 40 mm (1.57 in) Bofors anti-aircraft guns; 20 × 20 mm (0.79 in) Oerlikon anti-aircraft cannons
- Aircraft carried: 27
- Aviation facilities: 1 × catapult; 2 × elevators

Service record
- Part of: United States Pacific Fleet (1944–1946); Pacific Reserve Fleet (1946–1960)
- Operations: Operation Magic Carpet

USS Matanikau (CVE-101) was a Casablanca-class escort carrier of the United States Navy. She was named after the Actions along the Matanikau, a series of engagements during the Guadalcanal campaign. Built for service during World War II, the ship was launched in May 1944, and commissioned in June, and served as a training and transport carrier. Notably, some 1,332 aviators earned their qualifications on board the carrier. Postwar, she participated in Operation Magic Carpet. She was decommissioned in October 1946, when she was mothballed in the Pacific Reserve Fleet. Ultimately, she was sold for scrapping in July 1960.

== Design and description ==
A side profile of the design of Thetis Bay.

Matanikau was a Casablanca-class escort carrier, the most numerous type of aircraft carriers ever built. Built to stem heavy losses during the Battle of the Atlantic, they came into service in late 1943, by which time the U-boat threat was already in retreat. Although some did see service in the Atlantic, the majority were utilized in the Pacific, ferrying aircraft, providing logistics support, and conducting close air support for the island-hopping campaigns. The Casablanca-class carriers were built on the standardized Type S4-S2-BB3 hull, a lengthened variant of the Doyen-class hull, and specifically designed to be mass-produced using welded prefabricated sections. This allowed them to be produced at unprecedented speeds: the final ship of her class, Munda, was delivered to the Navy just 101 days after the laying of her keel.

Matanikau was 512 ft 3 in (156.13 m) long overall (490 ft (150 m) at the waterline), had a beam of 65 ft 2 in (19.86 m), and a draft of 20 ft 9 in (6.32 m). She displaced 8,188 long tons (8,319 t) standard, which increased to 10,902 long tons (11,077 t) with a full load. To carry out flight operations, the ship had a 257 ft (78 m) hangar deck and a 474 ft (144 m) flight deck. Her compact size necessitated the installation of an aircraft catapult at her bow, and there were two aircraft elevators to facilitate movement of aircraft between the flight and hangar deck: one each fore and aft.

She was powered by four Babcock & Wilcox Express D boilers that raised 285 psi (1,970 kPa) of steam at 577 °F (303 °C). The steam generated by these boilers fed two Skinner Unaflow reciprocating steam engines, delivering 9,000 hp (6,700 kW) to two propeller shafts. This allowed her to reach speeds of 19 kn (35 km/h; 22 mph), with a cruising range of 10,240 nmi (18,960 km; 11,780 mi) at 15 kn (28 km/h; 17 mph). For armament, one 5 in (127 mm)/38 caliber dual-purpose gun was mounted on the stern. Additional anti-aircraft defense was provided by eight Bofors 40 mm (1.57 in) anti-aircraft guns in single mounts and twelve Oerlikon 20 mm (0.79 in) cannons mounted around the perimeter of the deck. By 1945, Casablanca-class carriers had been modified to carry twenty Oerlikon cannons and sixteen Bofors guns; the doubling of the latter was accomplished by putting them into twin mounts. Sensors onboard consisted of a SG surface-search radar and a SK air-search radar.

Although Casablanca-class escort carriers were intended to function with a crew of 860 and an embarked squadron of 50 to 56, the exigencies of wartime often necessitated the inflation of the crew count. They were designed to operate with 27 aircraft, but the hangar deck could accommodate much more during transport or training missions.

== Construction ==
Her construction was awarded to Kaiser Shipbuilding Company, Vancouver, Washington under a Maritime Commission contract, on 18 June 1942, under the name Dolomi Bay, as part of a tradition which named escort carriers after bays or sounds in Alaska. The escort carrier was laid down on 10 March 1944, MC hull 1138, the forty-seventh of a series of fifty Casablanca-class escort carriers. She therefore received the classification symbol CVE-101. On 26 April 1944, she was renamed Matanikau, as part of a new naval policy which named subsequent Casablanca-class carriers after naval or land engagements. She was named after the Actions along the Matanikau, a series of engagements conducted as part of the larger Guadalcanal campaign. She was launched on 22 May 1944; sponsored by Mrs. Margaret Anna McLaren Grant, the wife of United States Representative Robert A. Grant; transferred to the United States Navy and commissioned on 24 June 1944, with Captain William Lawrence Erdmann in command.

== Service history ==
=== World War II ===
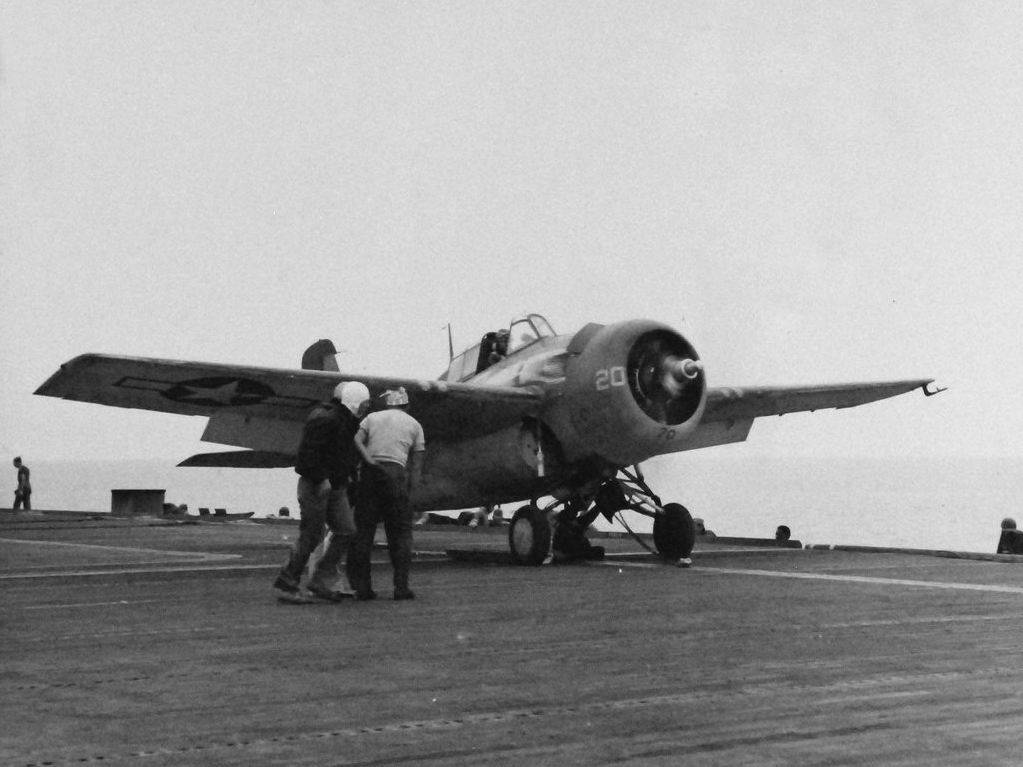
An FM-2 Wildcat fighter situated on the aircraft catapult preparing to take off, 27 July 1944.

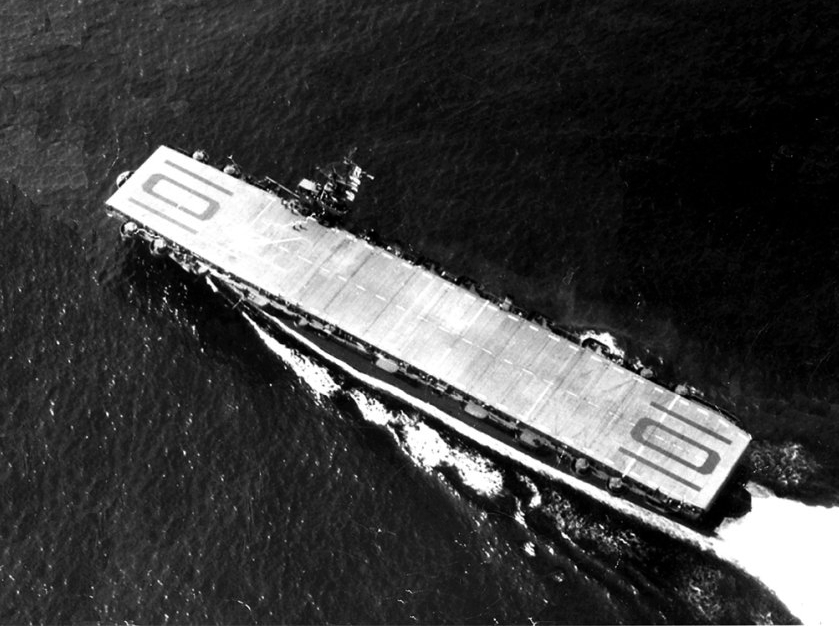
An aerial top-down photograph of the flight deck of Matanikau, circa 1944.

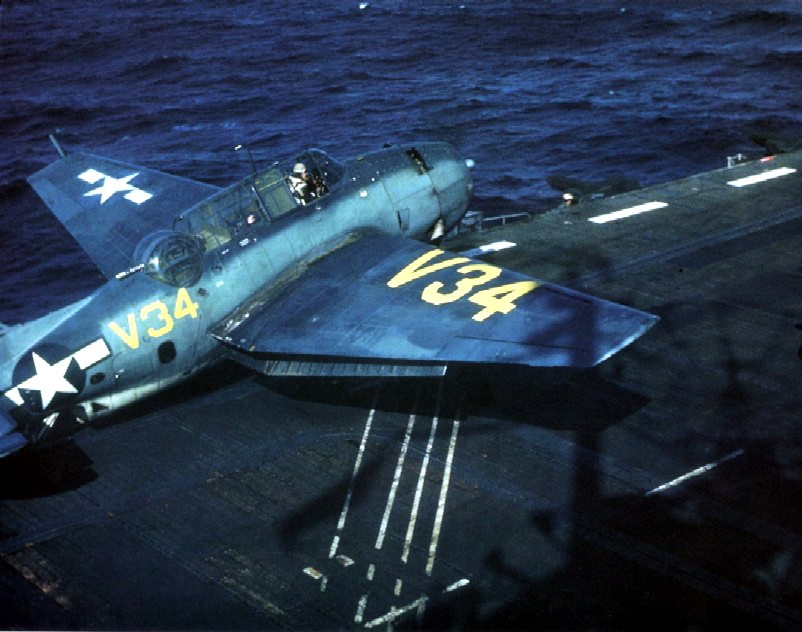
A TBM Avenger torpedo bomber taxis to the port aircraft catapult of Matanikau during training operations. This photograph was taken sometime between October 1944 and July 1945, during which Matanikau was conducting pilot qualifications.

Upon being commissioned, Matanikau underwent a shakedown cruise down the West Coast to San Diego, arriving on 25 July. She then underwent a transport mission, taking on 191 passengers and 56 aircraft. She departed on 1 August, bound for the South Pacific. She stopped at Espiritu Santo and Finschhafen, before arriving at Manus Island on 23 August. There, she discharged the rest of her cargo, and took on a load of 112 passengers and 41 damaged aircraft, ferrying them back to the West Coast. She arrived back at San Diego on 19 September. This transport mission would be the farthest west that she would ever sail during the course of the war. On 14 August, she took on Composite Squadron 93 (VC-93), and began pilot qualifications, serving as a training carrier off the California coast. She continued these duties for eight months, qualifying an impressive amount of aviators. Between January and June 1945, 1,332 pilots earned their qualifications onboard Matanikau, and 12,762 landings were conducted on her flight deck during this period. For example, on 25 May 1945, Marine Torpedo Bombing Squadrons 454 and 321 (CVS-454 and CVS-321) made 602 landings throughout the day. During her period as a training carrier, Captain Francis Benedict Johnson took over command of the vessel, a position that he would hold for the rest of the war.

She finished her duties as a training carrier, and departed San Diego on 28 July, yet again as a transport carrier, with 158 personnel and 68 aircraft being transported to the Marshall Islands. She arrived at Roi-Namur on 10 August, where she unloaded her cargo. She then reported to Pearl Harbor on 16 August. Whilst in Hawaii, news of the Japanese surrender broke. On 31 August, she departed Pearl Harbor, bound for the West Pacific, where she would support U.S. forces in their Occupation of Japan. She was assigned to the Ninth Fleet, and arrived at Ōminato Guard District on 11 September. She operated off the west coast of Japan, covering landings by U.S. forces, including the Eighth Army at Aomori on 25 September. Following the landings, she steamed south, and departed Tokyo Bay on 30 September, making stops at Guam and Pearl Harbor, before arriving back at San Francisco on 23 October.

At San Francisco, she joined the Operation Magic Carpet fleet, which repatriated U.S. servicemen from around the Pacific. She left the West Coast on 3 November, and steamed for Saipan, where she embarked more than a thousand personnel. She returned to California on 19 November, before making another run to the Marshalls between 21 November and 5 December. On 11 December, she once again departed, this time for the Marianas Islands, and as part of an operation independent of Operation Magic Carpet. She arrived at Guam on 27 December, where she took on a load of 795 troops of the 3rd Marine Division, and dropped them off at the Taku Forts, near Tianjin. There, the marines served in an advisory role, supporting the Kuomintang Republic of China in the Chinese Civil War.

She left for the United States on 9 January 1946, and returned to port in San Diego on 29 January. She departed for Tacoma, Washington on 1 February, arriving on the 5th for inactivation. There, she was moored for the next eight months, before being decommissioned on 11 October. She was mothballed as part of the Pacific Reserve Fleet, and she was reclassified as an escort helicopter aircraft carrier, CVHE-101 on 15 June 1955. She was reclassified as an aircraft ferry with the designation of AKV-36 on 7 May 1959. She was struck from the Navy list on 1 April 1960 and she was sold on 27 July 1960 to Jacq. Pierot Jr. & Sons, New York for scrapping.

== Sources ==
=== Online sources ===
- "Matanikau (CVE-101)". Dictionary of American Naval Fighting Ships. Naval History and Heritage Command. 27 April 2016. Archived from the original on 12 November 2019.
- "Kaiser Vancouver, Vancouver WA". www.ShipbuildingHistory.com. 27 November 2010. Archived from the original on 16 June 2019.
- "World Aircraft Carriers List: US Escort Carriers, S4 Hulls". Hazegray.org. 14 December 1998. Archived from the original on 19 November 2021.
- Maksel, Rebecca (14 August 2012). "How Do You Name an Aircraft Carrier?". Air & Space/Smithsonian.
- Stubblebine, Daniel (June 2011). "Escort Carrier Makin Island (CVE-93)". ww2db.com.

=== Bibliography ===
- Adcock, Al (1996), Escort Carriers in Action - Warships No. 9, Carrollton, Texas: Squadron/Signal Publications, ISBN 9780897473569
- Chesneau, Robert; Gardiner, Robert (1980), Conway's All the World's Fighting Ships 1922–1946, London, England: Naval Institute Press, ISBN 9780870219139
- Friedman, Norman (1983), U.S. Aircraft Carriers: An Illustrated Design History, Annapolis, Maryland: Naval Institute Press, ISBN 9780870217395
- Ross, Al (1993), The Escort Carrier Gambier Bay, Anatomy of the Ship, London, England: Conway Maritime Press, ISBN 9781557502353
- Y'Blood, William (2012), The Little Giants: U.S. Escort Carriers Against Japan, Annapolis, Maryland: Naval Institute Press, ISBN 9781612512471
