= USS Shipley Bay =

Casablanca-class escort carrier of the US Navy

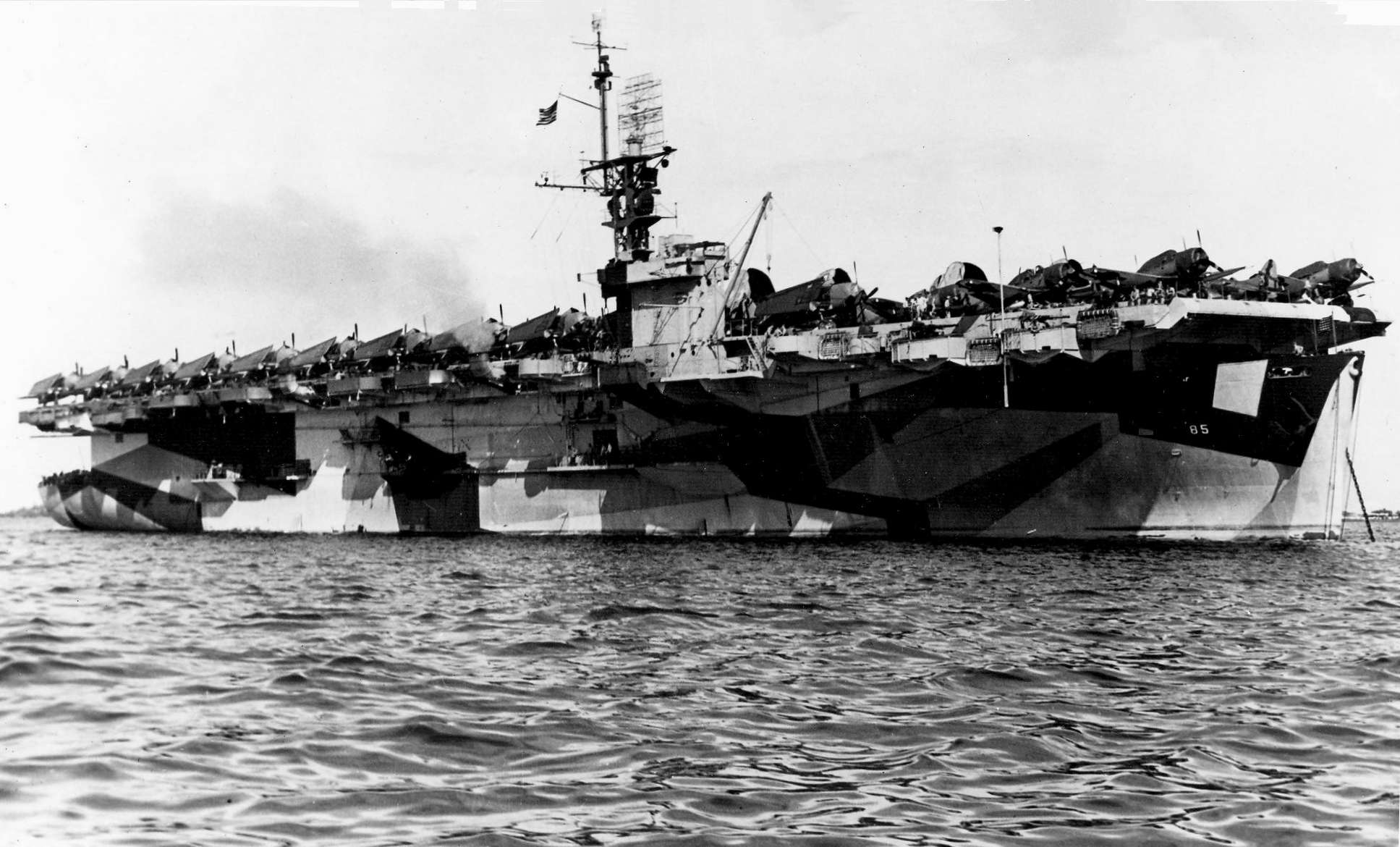
- USS Shipley Bay off Majuro Atoll, 18 May 1944

History

United States
- Name: Shipley Bay
- Namesake: Shipley Bay, Kosciusko Island
- Ordered: as a Type S4-S2-BB3 hull, MCE hull 1122
- Awarded: 18 June 1942
- Builder: Kaiser Shipyards
- Laid down: 22 November 1943
- Launched: 12 February 1944
- Commissioned: 21 March 1944
- Decommissioned: 28 June 1946
- Stricken: 1 March 1959
- Identification: Hull symbol: CVE-85
- Honors and awards: 2 Battle stars
- Fate: Sold for scrap, 2 October 1959

General characteristics
- Class & type: Casablanca-class escort carrier
- Displacement: 8,188 long tons (8,319 t) (standard); 10,902 long tons (11,077 t) (full load)
- Length: 512 ft 3 in (156.13 m) (oa); 490 ft (150 m) (wl); 474 ft (144 m) (fd)
- Beam: 65 ft 2 in (19.86 m); 108 ft (33 m) (extreme width)
- Draft: 20 ft 9 in (6.32 m) (max)
- Installed power: 4 × Babcock & Wilcox boilers; 9,000 shp (6,700 kW)
- Propulsion: 2 × Skinner Unaflow reciprocating steam engines; 2 × screws
- Speed: 19 knots (35 km/h; 22 mph)
- Range: 10,240 nmi (18,960 km; 11,780 mi) at 15 kn (28 km/h; 17 mph)
- Complement: Total: 910 – 916 officers and men; Embarked Squadron: 50 – 56; Ship's Crew: 860
- Armament: As designed: 1 × 5 in (127 mm)/38 cal dual-purpose gun; 4 × twin 40 mm (1.57 in) Bofors anti-aircraft guns; 12 × 20 mm (0.79 in) Oerlikon anti-aircraft cannons; Varied, ultimate armament: 1 × 5 in (127 mm)/38 cal dual-purpose gun; 8 × twin 40 mm (1.57 in) Bofors anti-aircraft guns; 20 × 20 mm (0.79 in) Oerlikon anti-aircraft cannons
- Aircraft carried: 27
- Aviation facilities: 1 × catapult; 2 × elevators

Service record
- Part of: United States Pacific Fleet (1944–1946); Atlantic Reserve Fleet (1946–1958)
- Operations: Battle of Okinawa; Operation Magic Carpet

USS Shipley Bay (CVE-85) was a Casablanca-class escort carrier of the United States Navy. She was named after Shipley Bay, located within Kosciusko Island. The bay in turn was named after Ensign John H. Shipley, an officer on the ship surveying the Alexander Archipelago. Launched in February 1944, and commissioned in March 1944, she served in support of the Battle of Okinawa. Postwar, she participated in Operation Magic Carpet. She was decommissioned in June 1946, when she was mothballed in the Atlantic Reserve Fleet. Ultimately, she was sold for scrapping in October 1959.

== Design and description ==
A side profile of the design of Thetis Bay

Corregidor was a Casablanca-class escort carrier, the most numerous type of aircraft carriers ever built. Built to stem heavy losses during the Battle of the Atlantic, they came into service in late 1943, by which time the U-boat threat was already in retreat. Although some did see service in the Atlantic, the majority were utilized in the Pacific, ferrying aircraft, providing logistics support, and conducting close air support for the island-hopping campaigns. The Casablanca-class carriers were built on the standardized Type S4-S2-BB3 hull, a lengthened variant of the Doyen-class hull, and specifically designed to be mass-produced using welded prefabricated sections. This allowed them to be produced at unprecedented speeds: the final ship of her class, Munda, was delivered to the Navy just 101 days after the laying of her keel.

Corregidor was 512 ft 3 in (156.13 m) long overall (490 ft (150 m) at the waterline), had a beam of 65 ft 2 in (19.86 m), and a draft of 20 ft 9 in (6.32 m). She displaced 8,188 long tons (8,319 t) standard, which increased to 10,902 long tons (11,077 t) with a full load. To carry out flight operations, the ship had a 257 ft (78 m) hangar deck and a 474 ft (144 m) flight deck. Her compact size necessitated the installation of an aircraft catapult at her bow, and there were two aircraft elevators to facilitate movement of aircraft between the flight and hangar deck: one each fore and aft.

She was powered by four Babcock & Wilcox Express D boilers that raised 285 psi (1,970 kPa) of steam at 577 °F (303 °C). The steam generated by these boilers fed two Skinner Unaflow reciprocating steam engines, delivering 9,000 hp (6,700 kW) to two propeller shafts. This allowed her to reach speeds of 19 kn (35 km/h; 22 mph), with a cruising range of 10,240 nmi (18,960 km; 11,780 mi) at 15 kn (28 km/h; 17 mph). For armament, one 5 in (127 mm)/38 caliber dual-purpose gun was mounted on the stern. Additional anti-aircraft defense was provided by eight Bofors 40 mm (1.57 in) anti-aircraft guns in single mounts and twelve Oerlikon 20 mm (0.79 in) cannons mounted around the perimeter of the deck. By 1945, Casablanca-class carriers had been modified to carry twenty Oerlikon cannons and sixteen Bofors guns; the doubling of the latter was accomplished by putting them into twin mounts. Sensors onboard consisted of a SG surface-search radar and a SK air-search radar.

Although Casablanca-class escort carriers were intended to function with a crew of 860 and an embarked squadron of 50 to 56, the exigencies of wartime often necessitated the inflation of the crew count. They were designed to operate with 27 aircraft, but the hangar deck could accommodate much more during transport or training missions.

== Construction ==
The escort carrier was laid down on 22 November 1943, under a Maritime Commission contract, MC hull 1122, by Kaiser Shipbuilding Company, Vancouver, Washington. She was named Shipley Bay, which in turn was named after Ensign John H. Shipley, who assisted in surveying the Alexander Archipelago. Her naming was part of a tradition which named escort carriers after bays or sounds in Alaska. She was launched on 12 February 1944; sponsored by Mrs. Lawrence B. Richardson; transferred to the United States Navy and commissioned on 21 March 1944, with Captain Edgar Tilghman Neale in command.

== Service history ==
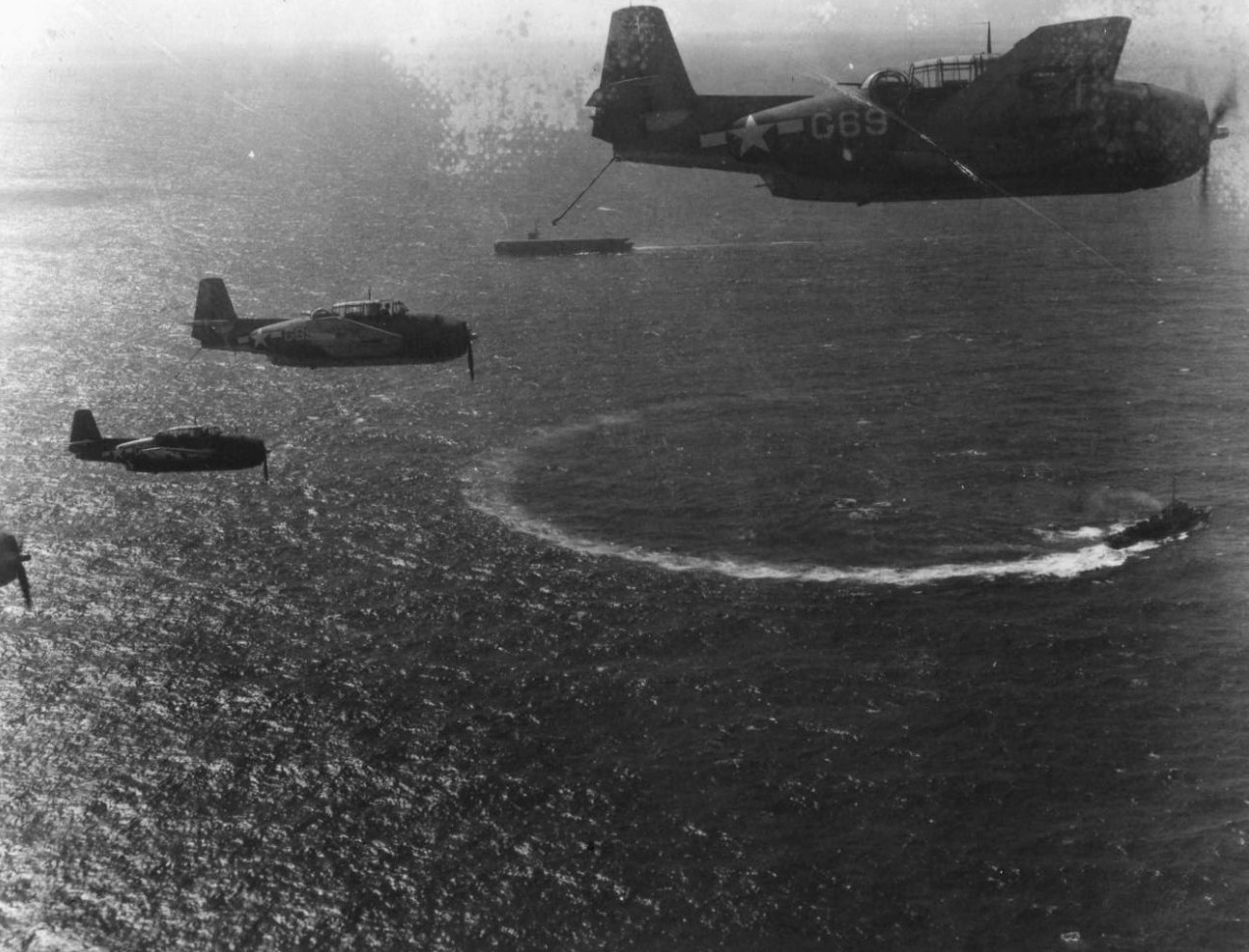
U.S. Grumman TBF Avengers in flight over Shipley Bay. A destroyer is visible in the foreground.

Upon being commissioned, Shipley Bay underwent a shakedown cruise down the West Coast to San Diego. She operated off the Southern California coast until 3 May, when she took on a load of aircraft and personnel, and ferried them to Pearl Harbor and stops in the South Pacific. She conducted these transport missions until October, making stops at the West Coast, Pearl Harbor, Majuro Atoll, Guadalcanal, and Tulagi. In these missions, she ferried a total of 496 aircraft.

After finishing her aircraft deliveries, she was designated the role of a replacement carrier, carrying aircraft to replenish battlefield losses. She was assigned to Task Group 30.8 within Task Force 38, and maintained a backline, supply role. In three meetings, she transferred a total of 100 aircraft to frontline carriers. The first rendezvous was conducted between 17 October and 29 October 150 mi (240 km) east of Samar, as she provided replacement aircraft for the desperate Battle off Samar. Her second transfer occurred 450 mi (720 km) east of Luzon, between 10 December and 24 December, as landings and close air support began being conducted for the ongoing Battle of Luzon. Her third and final transfer happened between 26 December 1944 and 12 January 1945 whilst Shipley Bay was 350 mi (560 km) northwest of Luzon, as an armada of carriers supported the Invasion of Lingayen Gulf.

After finishing her duties as a replacement carrier for the Philippines campaign, she operated off of Pearl Harbor as a training carrier for the next three months. During her tenure as a replacement carrier, Captain Austin Wadsworth Wheelock took over as commanding officer of the ship. On 22 April, she departed Pearl Harbor, bound for Okinawa. Stopping at Guam, she arrived on 7 May and immediately began operations. Between 7 May and 16 May, her aircraft conducted 352 sorties supporting the Battle of Okinawa, bombing Japanese defenses and equipment. On 16 May, her aviation gasoline tanks were damaged by a collision, forcing her to retire back to Guam for repairs.

Once repairs were finished, she once again returned to the waters off of Okinawa, along with five other escort carriers. She resumed operations on 9 June, and her aircraft were assigned the duty of neutralizing the five airfields on Miyako-jima and Ishigaki-jima, from which kamikaze aircraft were operating. She bombed the airfields between 14 and 16 June, returning again from 18 to 22 June. On 22 June, she left, bound for the West Coast, where she would undergo overhaul. She was moored at U.S. Repair Base, San Diego when the Japanese surrender was announced.

On 26 September, she left San Diego, and joined the "Magic Carpet" fleet, which repatriated U.S. servicemen from throughout the Pacific. She cruised around the Pacific, making stops at San Francisco, Pearl Harbor, Okinawa, and Kwajalein, ultimately returning several thousand troops back to the United States.

Shipley Bay sailed to Boston, Massachusetts in February 1946 in order to undergo deactivation, arriving on 9 March. She was decommissioned on 28 June 1946, and mothballed in the Atlantic Reserve Fleet at South Boston Naval Annex. On 12 June 1955, she was redesignated as a utility aircraft carrier, CVU-85. She was struck from the Navy list on 1 March 1959, and sold for scrap on 2 October. She was towed to Japan, where she was broken up throughout January 1961. She received two battle stars for her World War II service.

== Sources ==
=== Online sources ===
- "Shipley Bay (CVE-85)". Dictionary of American Naval Fighting Ships. Naval History and Heritage Command. 27 April 2016. Archived from the original on 21 December 2015.
- "Kaiser Vancouver, Vancouver WA". www.ShipbuildingHistory.com. 27 November 2010. Archived from the original on 16 June 2019.
- "World Aircraft Carriers List: US Escort Carriers, S4 Hulls". Hazegray.org. 14 December 1998. Archived from the original on 19 November 2021.

=== Bibliography ===
- Adcock, Al (1996), Escort Carriers in Action - Warships No. 9, Carrollton, Texas: Squadron/Signal Publications, ISBN 9780897473569
- Chesneau, Robert; Gardiner, Robert (1980), Conway's All the World's Fighting Ships 1922–1946, London, England: Naval Institute Press, ISBN 9780870219139
- Friedman, Norman (1983), U.S. Aircraft Carriers: An Illustrated Design History, Annapolis, Maryland: Naval Institute Press, ISBN 9780870217395
- Ross, Al (1993), The Escort Carrier Gambier Bay, Anatomy of the Ship, London, England: Conway Maritime Press, ISBN 9781557502353
- Samples, Fredio (2010), Wings over Sakishima, Snohomish, WA, ISBN 9780615396682
- Y'Blood, William (2012), The Little Giants: U.S. Escort Carriers Against Japan, Annapolis, Maryland: Naval Institute Press, ISBN 9781612512471
