= USS Sargent Bay =

Casablanca-class escort carrier of the US Navy

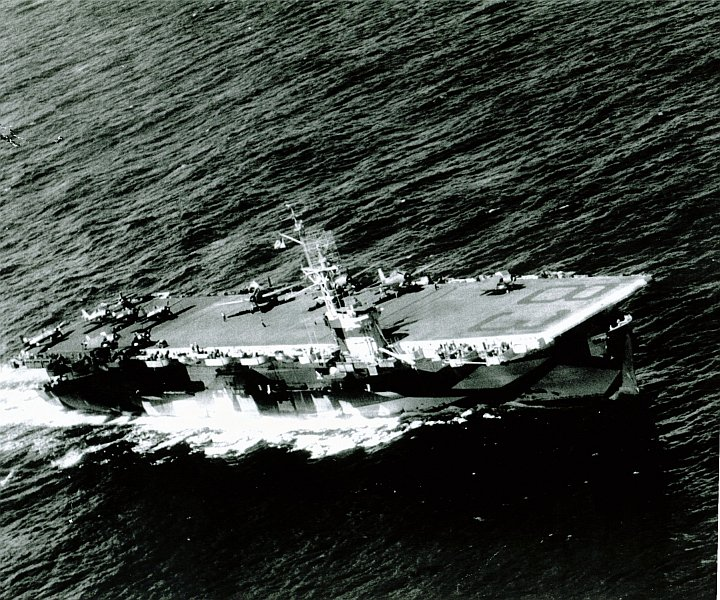
- USS Sargent Bay underway, circa 1944

History

United States
- Name: Sargent Bay
- Namesake: Sargent Bay, Revillagigedo Island
- Ordered: as a Type S4-S2-BB3 hull, MCE hull 1120
- Awarded: 18 June 1942
- Builder: Kaiser Shipyards
- Laid down: 8 November 1943
- Launched: 31 January 1944
- Commissioned: 9 March 1944
- Decommissioned: 23 June 1946
- Stricken: 27 June 1958
- Identification: Hull symbol: CVE-83
- Honors and awards: 6 Battle stars
- Fate: Sold for scrap, 30 July 1959

General characteristics
- Class & type: Casablanca-class escort carrier
- Displacement: 8,188 long tons (8,319 t) (standard); 10,902 long tons (11,077 t) (full load)
- Length: 512 ft 3 in (156.13 m) (oa); 490 ft (150 m) (wl); 474 ft (144 m) (fd)
- Beam: 65 ft 2 in (19.86 m); 108 ft (33 m) (extreme width)
- Draft: 20 ft 9 in (6.32 m) (max)
- Installed power: 4 × Babcock & Wilcox boilers; 9,000 shp (6,700 kW)
- Propulsion: 2 × Skinner Unaflow reciprocating steam engines; 2 × screws
- Speed: 19 knots (35 km/h; 22 mph)
- Range: 10,240 nmi (18,960 km; 11,780 mi) at 15 kn (28 km/h; 17 mph)
- Complement: Total: 910 – 916 officers and men; Embarked Squadron: 50 – 56; Ship's Crew: 860
- Armament: As designed: 1 × 5 in (127 mm)/38 cal dual-purpose gun; 4 × twin 40 mm (1.57 in) Bofors anti-aircraft guns; 12 × 20 mm (0.79 in) Oerlikon anti-aircraft cannons; Varied, ultimate armament: 1 × 5 in (127 mm)/38 cal dual-purpose gun; 8 × twin 40 mm (1.57 in) Bofors anti-aircraft guns; 20 × 20 mm (0.79 in) Oerlikon anti-aircraft cannons
- Aircraft carried: 27
- Aviation facilities: 1 × catapult; 2 × elevators

Service record
- Part of: United States Pacific Fleet (1944–1946); Atlantic Reserve Fleet (1946–1959)
- Operations: Invasion of Iwo Jima; Battle of Okinawa; Operation Magic Carpet

USS Sargent Bay (CVE-83) was a Casablanca-class escort carrier of the United States Navy. She was named after Sargent Bay, located within Revillagigedo Island, and was built for service during World War II. Launched in January 1944, and commissioned in March 1944, she served in support of the Invasion of Iwo Jima and the Battle of Okinawa. Postwar, she participated in Operation Magic Carpet. She was decommissioned in June 1946, when she was mothballed in the Atlantic Reserve Fleet. Ultimately, she was sold for scrapping in July 1959.

== Design and description ==
A side profile of the design of Thetis Bay.

Sargent Bay was a Casablanca-class escort carrier, the most numerous type of aircraft carriers ever built. Built to stem heavy losses during the Battle of the Atlantic, they came into service in late 1943, by which time the U-boat threat was already in retreat. Although some did see service in the Atlantic, the majority were utilized in the Pacific, ferrying aircraft, providing logistics support, and conducting close air support for the island-hopping campaigns. The Casablanca-class carriers were built on the standardized Type S4-S2-BB3 hull, a lengthened variant of the Doyen-class hull, and specifically designed to be mass-produced using welded prefabricated sections. This allowed them to be produced at unprecedented speeds: the final ship of her class, Munda, was delivered to the Navy just 101 days after the laying of her keel.

Sargent Bay was 512 ft 3 in (156.13 m) long overall (490 ft (150 m) at the waterline), had a beam of 65 ft 2 in (19.86 m), and a draft of 20 ft 9 in (6.32 m). She displaced 8,188 long tons (8,319 t) standard, which increased to 10,902 long tons (11,077 t) with a full load. To carry out flight operations, the ship had a 257 ft (78 m) hangar deck and a 474 ft (144 m) flight deck. Her compact size necessitated the installation of an aircraft catapult at her bow, and there were two aircraft elevators to facilitate movement of aircraft between the flight and hangar deck: one each fore and aft.

She was powered by four Babcock & Wilcox Express D boilers that raised 285 psi (1,970 kPa) of steam at 577 °F (303 °C). The steam generated by these boilers fed two Skinner Unaflow reciprocating steam engines, delivering 9,000 hp (6,700 kW) to two propeller shafts. This allowed her to reach speeds of 19 kn (35 km/h; 22 mph), with a cruising range of 10,240 nmi (18,960 km; 11,780 mi) at 15 kn (28 km/h; 17 mph). For armament, one 5 in (127 mm)/38 caliber dual-purpose gun was mounted on the stern. Additional anti-aircraft defense was provided by eight Bofors 40 mm (1.57 in) anti-aircraft guns in single mounts and twelve Oerlikon 20 mm (0.79 in) cannons mounted around the perimeter of the deck. By 1945, Casablanca-class carriers had been modified to carry twenty Oerlikon cannons and sixteen Bofors guns; the doubling of the latter was accomplished by putting them into twin mounts. Sensors onboard consisted of a SG surface-search radar and a SK air-search radar.

Although Casablanca-class escort carriers were intended to function with a crew of 860 and an embarked squadron of 50 to 56, the exigencies of wartime often necessitated the inflation of the crew count. They were designed to operate with 27 aircraft, but the hangar deck could accommodate much more during transport or training missions.

During the Invasion of Iwo Jima, she carried 20 FM-2 fighters, and 12 TBM-1C torpedo bombers, for a total of 32 aircraft. During the Battle of Okinawa, she carried 18 FM-2 fighters, 10 TBM-1C variant torpedo bombers, and 3 TBM-3 variant torpedo bombers, for a total of 31 aircraft.

== Construction ==
Her construction was awarded to Kaiser Shipbuilding Company, Vancouver, Washington under a Maritime Commission contract, on 18 June 1942, under the name Didrickson Bay, as part of a tradition which named escort carriers after bays or sounds in Alaska. The escort carrier was laid down on 8 November 1943, under a Maritime Commission contract, MC hull 1120, by Kaiser Shipbuilding Company, Vancouver, Washington. She was launched on 31 January 1944; sponsored by Mrs. Edith W. DeBaun; transferred to the United States Navy and commissioned on 9 March 1944.

== Service history ==
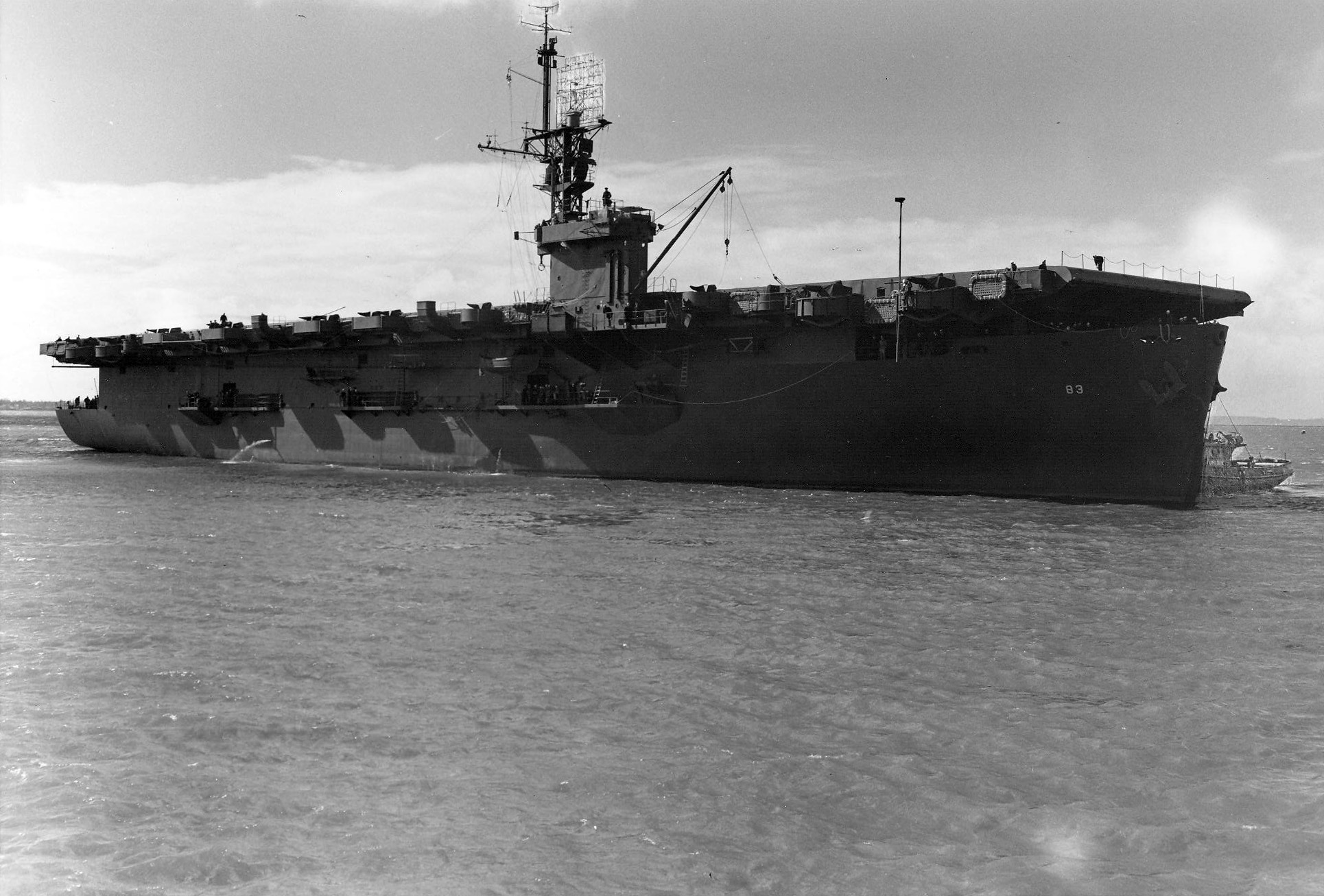
Sargent Bay being moved by tugs off the Washington coast, 25 March 1944.

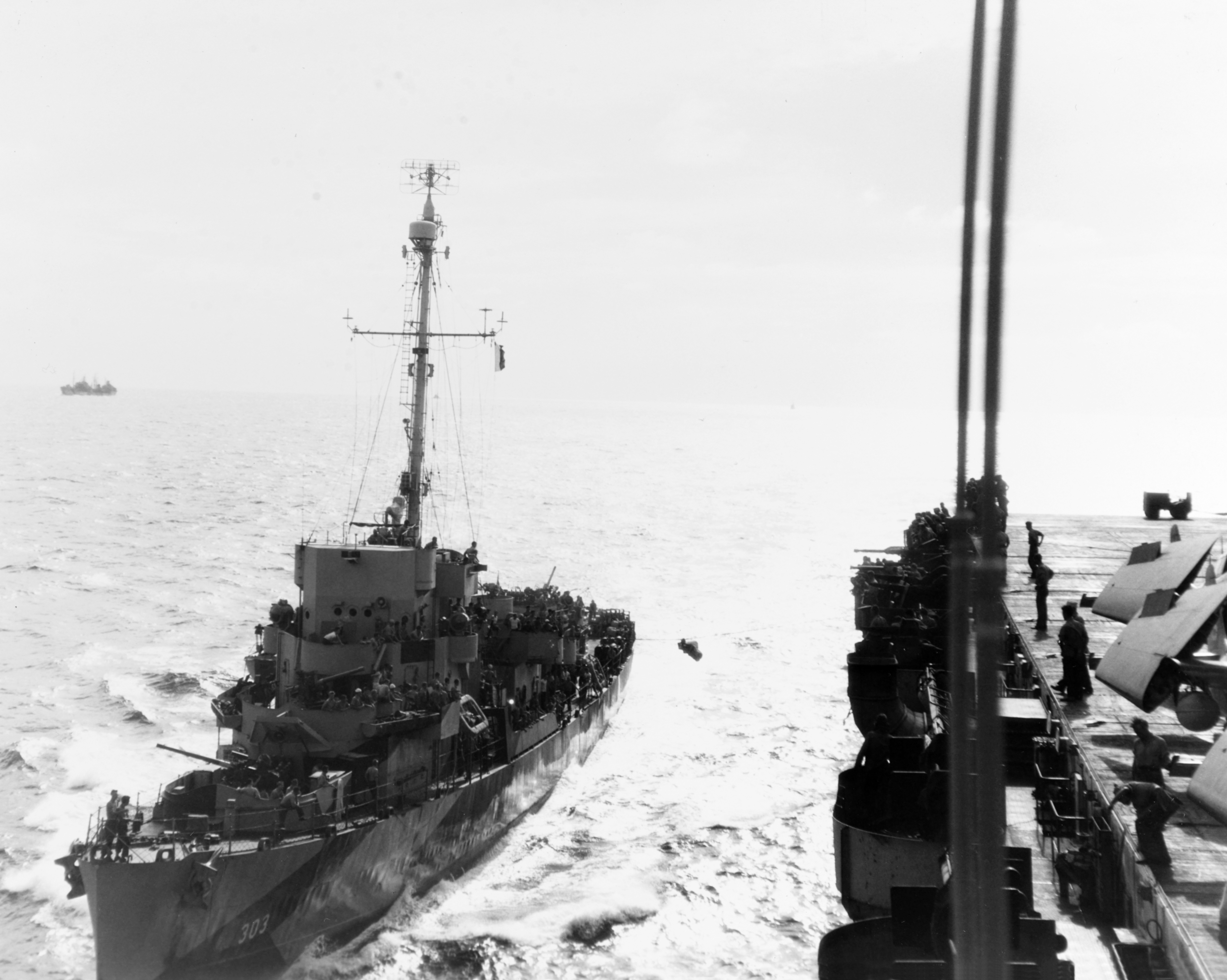
The destroyer escort Crowley transfers a sick crewman onto Sargent Bay.

Upon being commissioned, Sargent Bay underwent a shakedown cruise down the West Coast to San Diego. She then underwent a transport mission, ferrying P-47 Thunderbolts of the 333rd Fighter Squadron, 318th Fighter Group to Saipan. She unloaded her cargo on 18 July, and reported to the 3rd Fleet at Pearl Harbor on 17 August. The next day, she departed, bound for Eniwetok and Manus Island. On 6 November, she left Manus, assigned to Task Group 30.8 (Fleet Oiler and Transport Carrier Group) on the first of four tours with replenishment groups operating off the Philippines. She provided air cover and support for the vulnerable oilers which supplied the frontline fast carrier groups with fuel and replacement aircraft, enabling them to operate out at sea for long periods of time. During this time period, Sargent Bay was based out of Ulithi. She remained on this duty until 27 January 1945, staying out at sea in two to four week increments.

In February 1945, Sargent Bay was assigned to Task Group 52.2, the escort carrier group responsible for providing air cover in preparation for the Invasion of Iwo Jima. Along five other carriers, she operated under the command of Rear Admiral Clifton Sprague, in Carrier Division 26. Her air contingent provided artillery spotting and close air support for the marines struggling through the island, and she also conducted aircraft screening for the task group, as well as anti-submarine patrols. She continued operations until 11 March, when she retired along with her task group.

Sargent Bay was only out of action for a short period of time, as she joined Task Group 52.1.1, the escort carrier force assigned to support the planned Battle of Okinawa. Under the command of Rear Admiral Felix Stump, she began operations off of Okinawa on 25 March. She provided many of the same duties as she did during the Invasion of Iwo Jima, including conducting anti-aircraft patrols. Notably, on the late evening of 3 April, her fighters shot down one of a pair of kamikazes attempting to approach the escort carriers. Anti-aircraft fire from the destroyer Capps brought down the other kamikaze. On 7 April, she traded places with the escort carrier Makassar Strait, as she briefly left to join the Logistics Support Group, before returning to the strike force on 18 April. She left again on 15 May, for repairs at Guam. She rejoined operations over Okinawa on 2 June, before finally retiring from the operation on 20 June.

Proceeding south, she arrived off of Leyte on 23 June, and spent the next month performing upkeep. She then sailed for the United States, arriving at San Pedro on 9 August for repairs and overhaul. There, news of the Japanese surrender broke. After completing overhaul, she joined the Operation Magic Carpet fleet, which repatriated U.S. servicemen from around the Pacific. During the month of October, she made two runs, transporting personnel from Hawaii. She then conducted a run to Eniwetok, and a final run to Okinawa, finishing her duties before the New Year.

Passing through the Panama Canal, Sargent Bay arrived at Boston on 23 March 1946 for inactivation. She was decommissioned on 23 June, and subsequently stored at the South Boston Naval Annex, where she was mothballed as part of the Atlantic Reserve Fleet. She was reclassified CVU-83 on 12 June 1955. She was struck from the Navy list on 27 June 1958, and she was sold on 30 July 1959 to J.C. Berkwitt Co., New York. She was ultimately broken up in Antwerp, Belgium, starting September 1959.

== Sources ==
=== Online sources ===
- "Sargent Bay (CVE-83)". Dictionary of American Naval Fighting Ships. Naval History and Heritage Command. 27 April 2016. Archived from the original on 2 June 2019.
- "Kaiser Vancouver, Vancouver WA". www.ShipbuildingHistory.com. 27 November 2010. Archived from the original on 16 June 2019.
- "World Aircraft Carriers List: US Escort Carriers, S4 Hulls". Hazegray.org. 14 December 1998. Archived from the original on 19 November 2021.
- Maksel, Rebecca (14 August 2012). "How Do You Name an Aircraft Carrier?". Air & Space/Smithsonian.

=== Bibliography ===
- Adcock, Al (1996), Escort Carriers in Action - Warships No. 9, Carrollton, Texas: Squadron/Signal Publications, ISBN 9780897473569
- Chesneau, Robert; Gardiner, Robert (1980), Conway's All the World's Fighting Ships 1922–1946, London, England: Naval Institute Press, ISBN 9780870219139
- Friedman, Norman (1983), U.S. Aircraft Carriers: An Illustrated Design History, Annapolis, Maryland: Naval Institute Press, ISBN 9780870217395
- Ross, Al (1993), The Escort Carrier Gambier Bay, Anatomy of the Ship, London, England: Conway Maritime Press, ISBN 9781557502353
- Y'Blood, William (2012), The Little Giants: U.S. Escort Carriers Against Japan, Annapolis, Maryland: Naval Institute Press, ISBN 9781612512471
