= USS Nehenta Bay =

Casablanca-class escort carrier of the US Navy

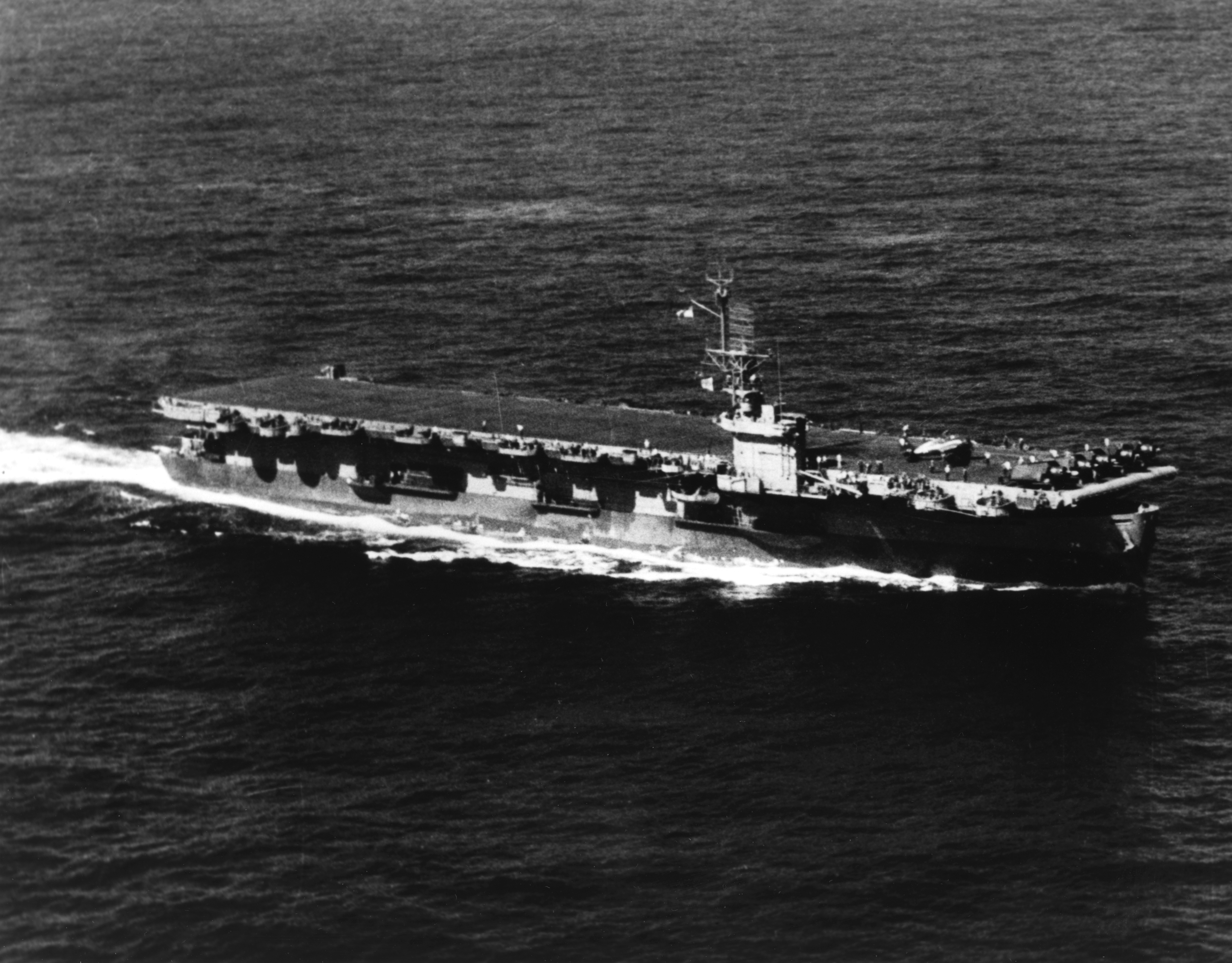
- USS Nehenta Bay underway, circa 1944

History

United States
- Name: Nehenta Bay
- Namesake: Nehenta Bay, Gravina Island
- Ordered: as a Type S4-S2-BB3 hull, MCE hull 1111
- Awarded: 18 June 1942
- Builder: Kaiser Shipyards
- Laid down: 20 July 1943
- Launched: 28 November 1943
- Commissioned: 3 January 1944
- Decommissioned: 15 May 1946
- Stricken: 1 April 1960
- Identification: Hull symbol: CVE-74
- Honors and awards: 7 Battle stars
- Fate: Sold for scrap, 29 June 1960

General characteristics
- Class & type: Casablanca-class escort carrier
- Displacement: 8,188 long tons (8,319 t) (standard); 10,902 long tons (11,077 t) (full load)
- Length: 512 ft 3 in (156.13 m) (oa); 490 ft (150 m) (wl); 474 ft (144 m) (fd)
- Beam: 65 ft 2 in (19.86 m); 108 ft (33 m) (extreme width)
- Draft: 20 ft 9 in (6.32 m) (max)
- Installed power: 4 × Babcock & Wilcox boilers; 9,000 shp (6,700 kW)
- Propulsion: 2 × Skinner Unaflow reciprocating steam engines; 2 × screws
- Speed: 19 knots (35 km/h; 22 mph)
- Range: 10,240 nmi (18,960 km; 11,780 mi) at 15 kn (28 km/h; 17 mph)
- Complement: Total: 910 – 916 officers and men; Embarked Squadron: 50 – 56; Ship's Crew: 860
- Armament: As designed: 1 × 5 in (127 mm)/38 cal dual-purpose gun; 4 × twin 40 mm (1.57 in) Bofors anti-aircraft guns; 12 × 20 mm (0.79 in) Oerlikon anti-aircraft cannons; Varied, ultimate armament: 1 × 5 in (127 mm)/38 cal dual-purpose gun; 8 × twin 40 mm (1.57 in) Bofors anti-aircraft guns; 20 × 20 mm (0.79 in) Oerlikon anti-aircraft cannons
- Aircraft carried: 27
- Aviation facilities: 1 × catapult; 2 × elevators

Service record
- Part of: United States Pacific Fleet (1944–1946); Atlantic Reserve Fleet (1946–1960)
- Operations: Mariana and Palau Islands campaign; Battle of Okinawa; Operation Magic Carpet

USS Nehenta Bay (CVE-74) was a Casablanca-class escort carrier of the United States Navy. She was named after Nehenta Bay, located within Gravina Island. Built for service during World War II, the ship was launched in November 1943, and commissioned in January 1944, and served in support of the Mariana and Palau Islands campaign and the Battle of Okinawa. Postwar, she participated in Operation Magic Carpet. She was decommissioned in May 1946, when she was mothballed in the Atlantic Reserve Fleet. Ultimately, she was sold for scrapping in June 1960.

== Design and description ==
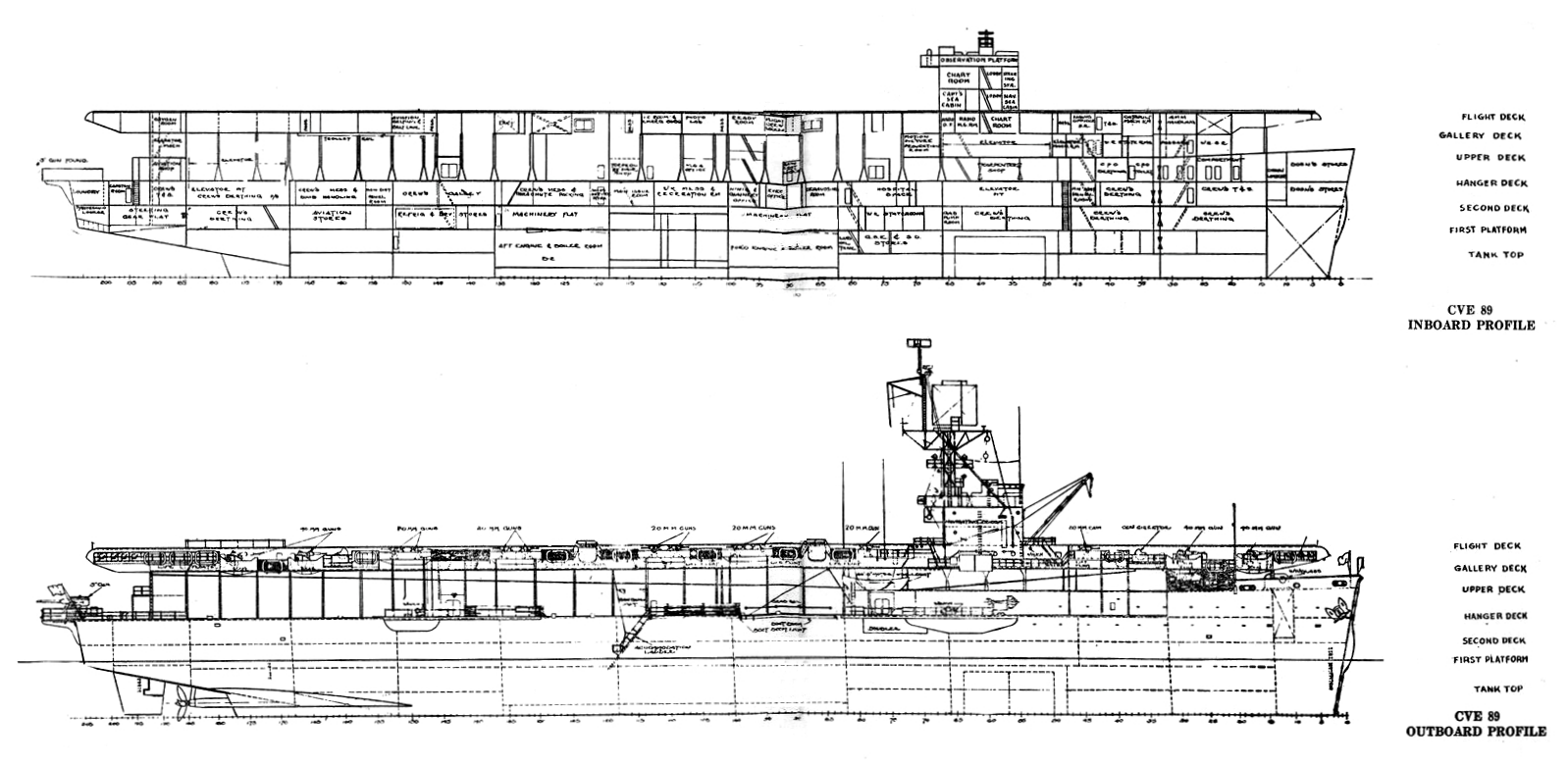
A profile of the design of Takanis Bay, which was shared with all Casablanca-class escort carriers.

Nehenta Bay was a Casablanca-class escort carrier, the most numerous type of aircraft carriers ever built, and designed specifically to be mass-produced using prefabricated sections, in order to replace heavy early war losses. Standardized with her sister ships, she was 512 ft 3 in (156.13 m) long overall, had a beam of 65 ft 2 in (19.86 m), and a draft of 20 ft 9 in (6.32 m). She displaced 8,188 long tons (8,319 t) standard, 10,902 long tons (11,077 t) with a full load. She had a 257 ft (78 m) long hangar deck and a 477 ft (145 m) long flight deck. She was powered with two Skinner Unaflow reciprocating steam engines, which drove two shafts, providing 9,000 horsepower (6,700 kW), thus enabling her to make 19 knots (35 km/h; 22 mph). The ship had a cruising range of 10,240 nautical miles (18,960 km; 11,780 mi) at a speed of 15 knots (28 km/h; 17 mph). Her compact size necessitated the installment of an aircraft catapult at her bow, and there were two aircraft elevators to facilitate movement of aircraft between the flight and hangar deck: one each fore and aft.

One 5-inch (127 mm)/38 caliber dual-purpose gun was mounted on the stern. Anti-aircraft defense was provided by eight Bofors 40-millimeter (1.6 in) anti-aircraft guns in single mounts, as well as twelve Oerlikon 20-millimeter (0.79 in) cannons, which were mounted around the perimeter of the deck. By the end of the war, Casablanca-class carriers had been modified to carry thirty 20-mm cannons, and the amount of 40-mm guns had been doubled to sixteen, by putting them into twin mounts. These modifications were in response to increasing casualties due to kamikaze attacks. Casablanca-class escort carriers were designed to carry 27 aircraft, but the hangar deck could accommodate more.

== Construction ==
The escort carrier was laid down on 20 July 1943, under a Maritime Commission contract, MC hull 1111, by Kaiser Shipbuilding Company, Vancouver, Washington. She was named Nehenta Bay, after a bay in Gravina Island, as part of a tradition which named escort carriers after bays or sounds in Alaska. She was launched on 28 November 1943; sponsored by Mrs. Robert H. Lewis; transferred to the United States Navy and commissioned on 3 January 1944, with Captain Horace Bushnell Butterfield in command.

== Service history ==
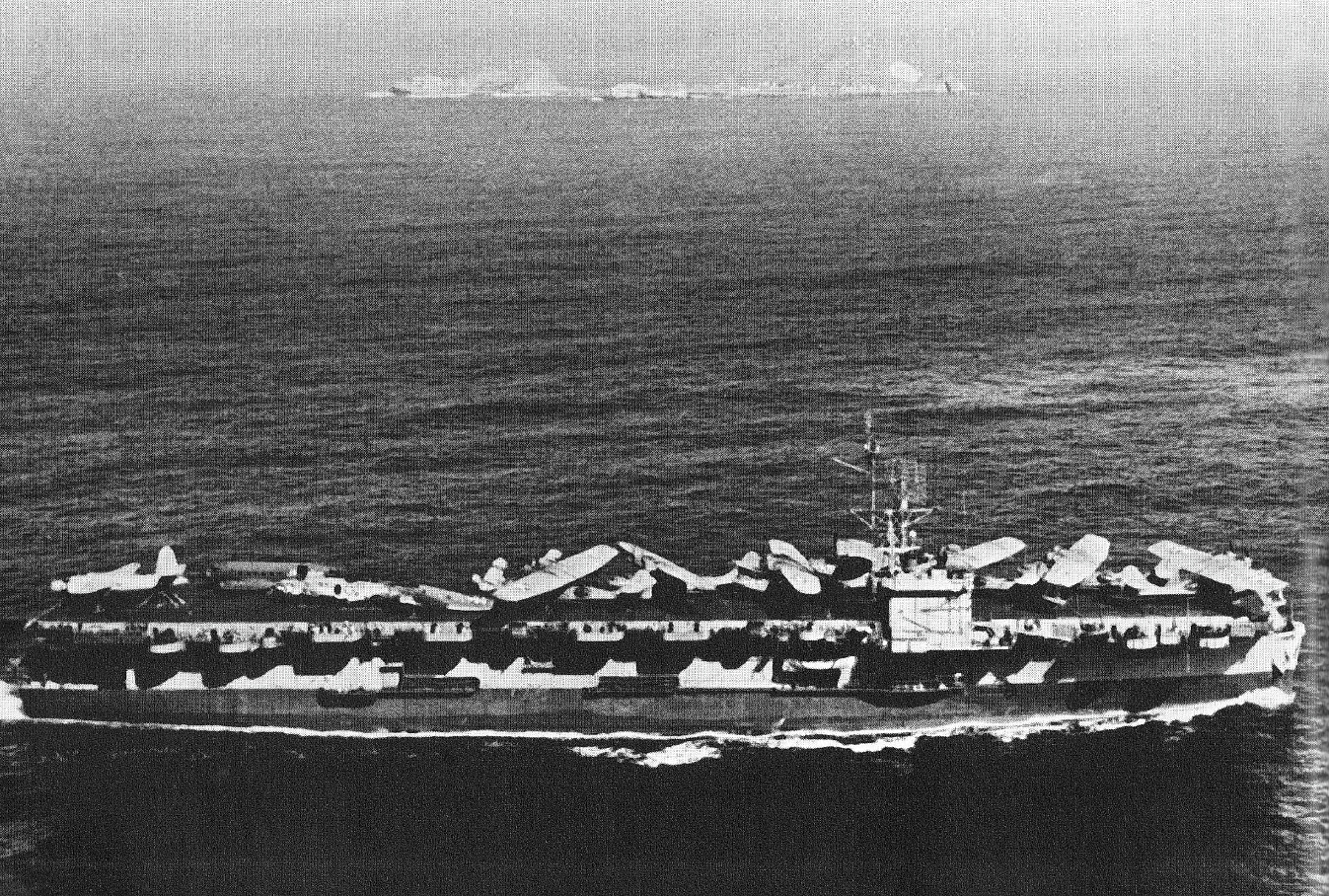
Nehenta Bay underway at sea, transporting aircraft, circa 1945.

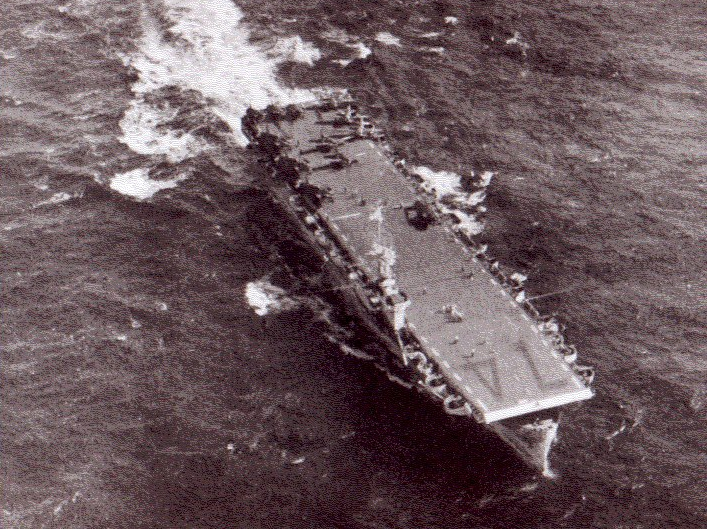
Nehenta Bay underway at sea in 1945. She is painted in Camouflage Measure 33, Design 10A.

Upon being commissioned, Nehenta Bay underwent a shakedown cruise down the West Coast to San Francisco. She then underwent a transport mission to Pearl Harbor on 6 February, carrying a load of replacement aircraft and military personnel. She arrived at Pearl Harbor on 12 February, where she took on a load of damaged planes which required repairs. She arrived at San Diego on 21 February, where she unloaded her cargo. After training exercises off the Southern California coast, she made another transport run to Hawaii on 18 March. After stopping at Hawaii, she proceeded westwards to Majuro, arriving there on 7 April. She then returned to San Diego, stopping at Pearl Harbor along the way, and arriving on 27 April, carrying wounded military personnel, as well as nonfunctional aircraft.

Nehenta Bay then conducted additional exercises off the West Coast, and steamed for Hawaii, where additional combat readiness training ensued. After finishing her exercises, she left Pearl Harbor on 18 June, bound for the Mariana Islands, in support of the Mariana and Palau Islands campaign. She joined Task Group 52.14, under the command of Rear Admiral Gerald F. Bogan. With Composite Squadron 11 (VC-11) on-board, she was based on newly-captured Enewetak Atoll. There, her aircraft conducted antisubmarine patrols, and provided close air support covering the Battle of Tinian. Notably, her aircraft strafed Tinian on 5 and 7 July, attacking gun emplacements and a sugar refinery. She returned to Enewetak on 16 July to refuel and replenish. She then joined the then Midway (later renamed the St. Lo), along with twelve destroyer escorts, in conducting antisubmarine patrols off Guam and Saipan. In the meantime, she also launched strikes in support of the ongoing Battle of Saipan.

After finishing her patrol, she became a replenishment carrier, supporting the Third Fleet's frontline Fast Carrier Task Force as part of Task Group 30.8, the Fleet Oiler and Transport Carrier Group. She escorted vulnerable fleet oilers as they proceeded to the frontlines, protecting them from Japanese submarines and aircraft. Escort carriers such as Nehenta Bay enabled the frontline carriers to replace battle losses, and to stay at sea for longer durations of time. She was based on Manus and Ulithi, where she received supplies and replacement aircraft. On 18 December, as part of Task Group 30.8.12, she braved Typhoon Cobra.

=== Typhoon Cobra ===
The Third Fleet had been operating against positions on Luzon since 14 December, but its escorting destroyers ran low on fuel. As a result, the fleet retired to the east to refuel, and to receive replacement aircraft from Task Group 30.8. She rendezvoused with the Third Fleet about 300 mi (480 km) east of Luzon early on 17 December. The location had been chosen because it lay out of range of Japanese fighters, but it also happened to lie within Typhoon Alley, where many Pacific tropical cyclones transited. As the escort carriers and the Third Fleet met, Typhoon Cobra began to bear down. At 1:00 in the night, fueling operations were attempted with the destroyers, although heavy winds and listing seas complicated the matter. At the same time, barometers on-board the ships began to drop, and tropical storm force winds were recorded.

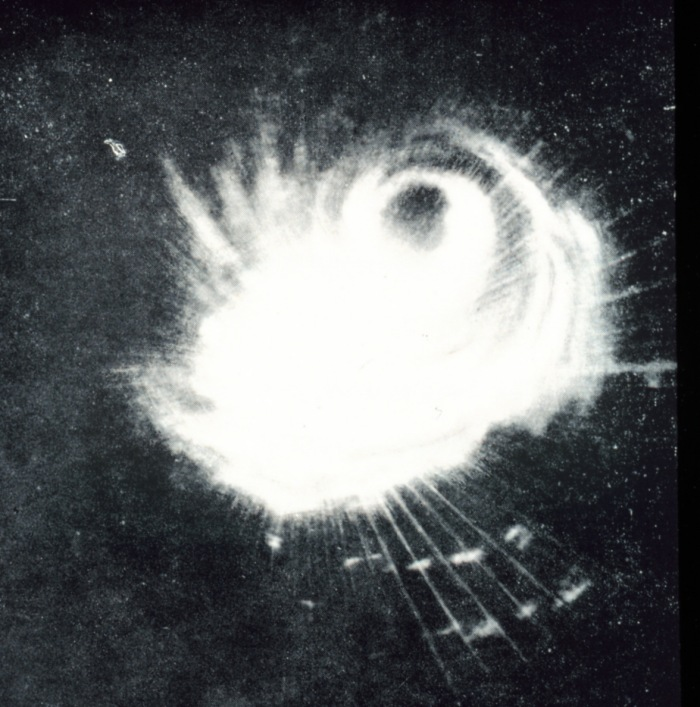
A radar image of Typhoon Cobra, 18 December 1944.

As the weather continued to deteriorate, Admiral William Halsey Jr. ordered fueling operations suspended at 13:10, just after noon. He ordered his fleet to move to the next morning's planned rendezvous spot, approximately 160 mi (260 km) northwest, and comfortably safe from the typhoon's impacts. Two hours later, he instead ordered his fleet to proceed due southwards, 180 mi (290 km) from where the fleet was located. This brought the fleet directly into the typhoon's core. To make matters worse for the Third Fleet, Halsey ordered the fleet to proceed northwards at 22:20, putting the fleet in the quadrant of the typhoon with the highest winds. Blurry data and observations meant that command had little idea of where the typhoon actually was, with some weather maps pinning the typhoon's center some 100 mi (160 km) away, even whilst the fleet sailed directly into the eye. Attached to the Third Fleet, Nehenta Bay followed.

At 7:00, on the morning of 18 December, the fleet was inescapably trapped in the typhoon's path. Conflicting orders meant that some of the destroyers attempted to do some fueling during the morning, even as waves with an estimated height of 60 ft (18 m) pounded the task force. At 7:22, Nehenta Bay came to course at 60°, along with Kwajalein and Rudyerd Bay. As Nehenta Bay struggled to maintain her course, massive waves crested over her flight deck. Captain Butterfield radioed to Vice Admiral John S. McCain Sr. that Nehenta Bay could not continue on her given path, and asked for permission to change course. At 7:52, McCain replied to the affirmative, and Nehenta Bay turned due south. At the time, she was rolling at about 30° to 37°, a dangerous angle for an aircraft carrier. Steering control was momentarily lost due to the typhoon, but it was quickly regained. To maintain steerageway, she increased her speed to 12 kn (22 km/h; 14 mph), before Butterfield decided that it would be easier to change the ship on a northwesterly heading.

This change in course stabilized Nehenta Bay. Her rolls steadied to a bit less than 30°, but her crew still had to fight to stay in control against heavy seas and gusty winds. A full rudder was required to keep her bow aligned against gusts of up to 95 kn (176 km/h; 109 mph). Eventually, the winds died down, and Nehenta Bay emerged from the storm with relatively little damage. Only three planes on her flight deck had been carried overboard, with another blown loose and stuck on a catwalk. The 20-mm cannon mounted on said catwalk had been ejected from the carrier as a result of the collision. There was minor damage on the flight deck, but her loss in cargo and hull integrity was little compared to her fellow ships of Task Group 30.8.

=== Battle of Okinawa ===
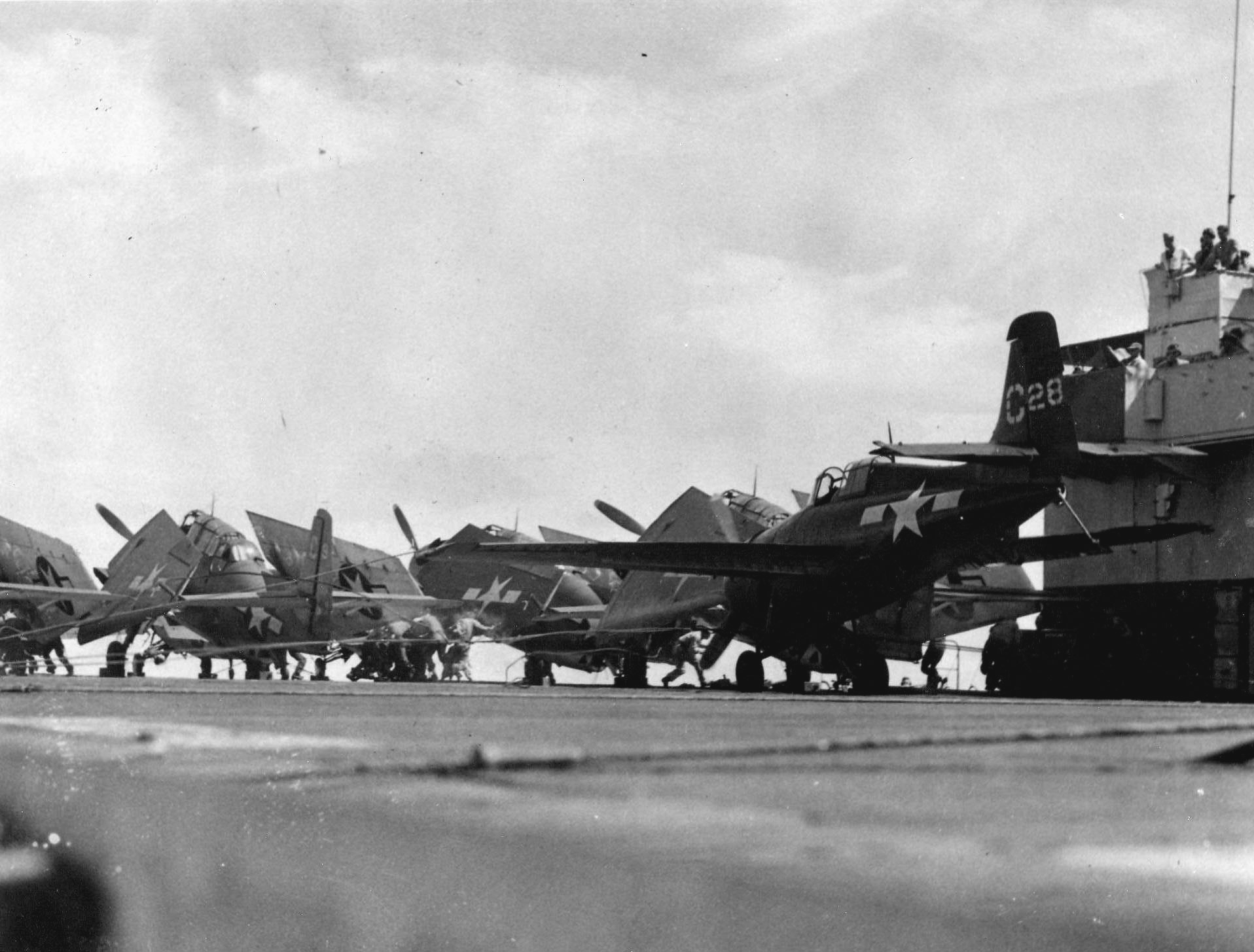
An FM-2 Wildcat fighter of Composite Squadron 11 (VC-11) slams into a barricade during flight operations onboard Nehenta Bay, 21 January 1945.

She continued her replenishment duties after the typhoon, and on 27 December, Captain Edward Orrick McDonnell took over command of the vessel. On 12 January 1945, her aircraft contingent saw some action. At the time, she was providing cover and support for the vulnerable fleet oilers. At 7:10 in the morning, an Aichi E13A reconnaissance seaplane was detected by radar about 64 mi (103 km) away from Nehenta Bay. A squadron of fighters was launched in response to the threat, and the Japanese plane was engaged by fighters 13 mi (21 km) away from the task group. After an unsuccessful attempt to disengage, the seaplane spiraled into the ocean. On 17 January, whilst Nehenta Bay was operating in the South China Sea, she once again suffered damage as a result of the weather. Throughout the day, refueling operations had been hampered by heavy surf and wind. At around 19:30, heavy waves, up to 30 ft (9.1 m) high, started cresting over the flight deck. Some steel supports near her bow buckled under the waves, and the flight deck bent down and sank, rendering the aircraft catapult inoperational. She continued to launch replacement aircraft, although her duties were cut back.

She was discharged from her Task Group, and returned to San Diego on 19 February for overhaul and repairs. She then proceeded for Hawaii, where training exercises were conducted. She then briefly served as a training carrier, conducting pilot qualifications off of Guam, before arriving at Ulithi on 9 May, where she prepared to begin operations in support of the landings on Okinawa. She joined Task Unit 52.1 under Rear Admiral Calvin T. Durgin in May, with Composite Squadron 8 (VC-8) onboard. She then began flying missions and making strikes as U.S. forces advanced down the island. During this period, her task group came under frequent kamikaze attacks, most notably on 7 June, when two carriers were struck by aircraft. After finishing her duties, she once again served as a replenishment carrier until the end of the war, guarding fleet oilers as they transited towards the Fast Carrier Task Force, which was launching strikes against the Japanese home islands.

=== Post-war ===
She was en route to the Aleutian Islands when the Japanese surrender was announced on 15 August. On 31 August, Nehenta Bay sailed to Mutsu Bay in support of the Occupation of Japan. There, she watched on as Vice Admiral Frank Jack Fletcher accepted the formal surrender of Japanese forces in northern Honshu and Hokkaido on 6 September. Her aircraft contingent dropped supplies to prisoners of war, and conducted patrols as U.S. forces landed throughout the Japanese islands.

She returned to Pearl Harbor on 24 September, where she disembarked her aircraft squadron, aviation equipment, and excess gasoline. She then joined the Operation Magic Carpet fleet, which repatriated U.S. servicemen from around the Pacific. She first made a run to the Marshall Islands on 30 September, repatriating them to San Francisco in mid-October. She then made another run to the Philippines throughout November, returning to the West Coast on 27 November. She was then discharged from the Magic Carpet fleet, and steamed for Boston, passing through the Panama Canal. She arrived on 31 January 1946, whereupon inactivation work was conducted. She was decommissioned on 15 May, and mothballed as part of the Atlantic Reserve Fleet. Berthed at the East Boston Naval Annex, she suffered extensive damage on 31 August 1954 as a result of Hurricane Carol, which toppled a dockyard crane onto her flight deck.

She was redesignated as a utility aircraft carrier, CVU-74, on 12 June 1955. She was once again redesignated, this time as an aircraft transport, AKV-24, on 7 May 1959. She was struck from the Navy list on 1 April 1960, and sold on 29 June 1960 to Coalmarket Inc. for scrapping. She was ultimately broken up in Hong Kong during June 1960. She received seven battle stars for her World War II service.

== Sources ==
=== Online sources ===
- "Nehenta Bay (CVE-74)". Dictionary of American Naval Fighting Ships. Naval History and Heritage Command. 27 April 2016. Archived from the original on 23 November 2017.
- "Kaiser Vancouver, Vancouver WA". www.ShipbuildingHistory.com. 27 November 2010. Archived from the original on 16 June 2019.
- "World Aircraft Carriers List: US Escort Carriers, S4 Hulls". Hazegray.org. 14 December 1998. Archived from the original on 19 November 2021.

=== Bibliography ===
- Chesneau, Robert; Gardiner, Robert (1980), Conway's All the World's Fighting Ships 1922–1946, London, England: Naval Institute Press, ISBN 9780870219139
- Y'Blood, William (2014), The Little Giants: U.S. Escort Carriers Against Japan (E-book), Annapolis, Maryland: Naval Institute Press, ISBN 9781612512471
