= USS Takanis Bay =

Casablanca-class escort carrier of the US Navy

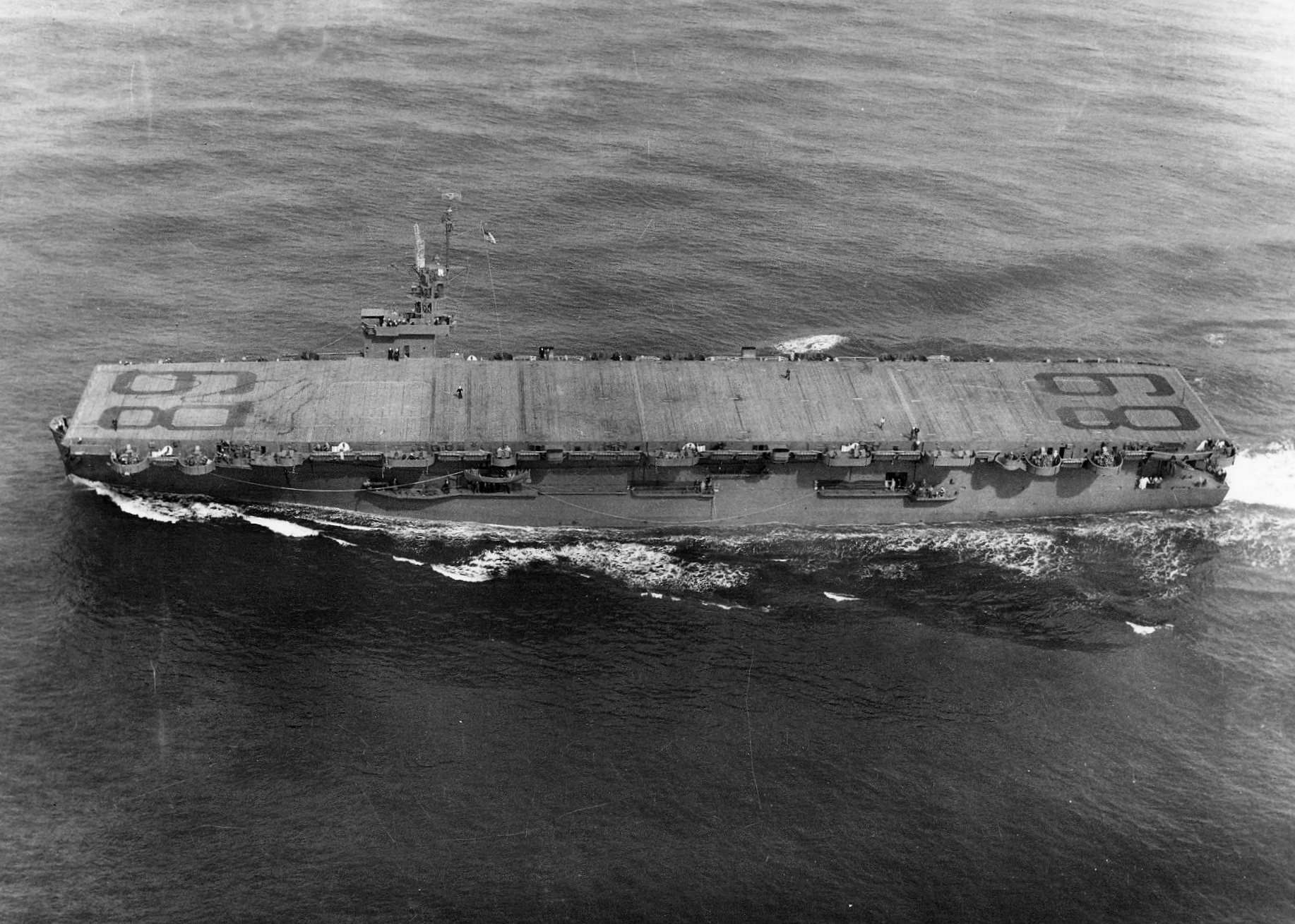
- USS Takanis Bay (CVE-89) underway in May 1944

History

United States
- Name: Takanis Bay
- Namesake: Takanis Bay, Yakobi Island, Alaska
- Ordered: as a Type S4-S2-BB3 hull, MCE hull 1126
- Awarded: 18 June 1942
- Builder: Kaiser Shipyards
- Laid down: 16 December 1943
- Launched: 10 March 1944
- Commissioned: 15 April 1944
- Decommissioned: 18 June 1946
- Identification: Hull symbol: CVE-89
- Fate: Sold for scrap, 29 June 1960

General characteristics
- Class & type: Casablanca-class escort carrier
- Displacement: 8,188 long tons (8,319 t) (standard); 10,902 long tons (11,077 t) (full load)
- Length: 512 ft 3 in (156.13 m) (oa); 490 ft (150 m) (wl); 474 ft (144 m) (fd)
- Beam: 65 ft 2 in (19.86 m); 108 ft (33 m) (extreme width)
- Draft: 20 ft 9 in (6.32 m) (max)
- Installed power: 4 × Babcock & Wilcox boilers; 9,000 shp (6,700 kW)
- Propulsion: 2 × Skinner Unaflow reciprocating steam engines; 2 × screws
- Speed: 19 knots (35 km/h; 22 mph)
- Range: 10,240 nmi (18,960 km; 11,780 mi) at 15 kn (28 km/h; 17 mph)
- Complement: Total: 910 – 916 officers and men; Embarked Squadron: 50 – 56; Ship's Crew: 860
- Armament: As designed: 1 × 5 in (127 mm)/38 cal dual-purpose gun; 4 × twin 40 mm (1.57 in) Bofors anti-aircraft guns; 12 × 20 mm (0.79 in) Oerlikon anti-aircraft cannons; Varied, ultimate armament: 1 × 5 in (127 mm)/38 cal dual-purpose gun; 8 × twin 40 mm (1.57 in) Bofors anti-aircraft guns; 20 × 20 mm (0.79 in) Oerlikon anti-aircraft cannons
- Aircraft carried: 27
- Aviation facilities: 1 × catapult; 2 × elevators

Service record
- Part of: United States Pacific Fleet (1943–1946)
- Operations: Operation Magic Carpet

USS Takanis Bay (CVE-89) was a Casablanca-class escort carrier of the United States Navy, which served during World War II. She was named after Takanis Bay on the west side of Yakobi Island in Alaska (near Sitka). Launched in March 1944 and commissioned in April, she served as a carrier training vessel, operating off of San Diego. Following the end of hostilities, she repatriated troops from the Pacific theater as part of Operation Magic Carpet.

== Design and description ==
A side profile of the design of Thetis Bay.

Takanis Bay was a Casablanca-class escort carrier, the most numerous type of aircraft carriers ever built. Built to stem heavy losses during the Battle of the Atlantic, they came into service in late 1943, by which time the U-boat threat was already in retreat. Although some did see service in the Atlantic, the majority were utilized in the Pacific, ferrying aircraft, providing logistics support, and conducting close air support for the island-hopping campaigns. The Casablanca-class carriers were built on the standardized Type S4-S2-BB3 hull, a lengthened variant of the Doyen-class hull, and specifically designed to be mass-produced using welded prefabricated sections. This allowed them to be produced at unprecedented speeds: the final ship of her class, Munda, was delivered to the Navy just 101 days after the laying of her keel.

Takanis Bay was 512 ft 3 in (156.13 m) long overall (490 ft (150 m) at the waterline), had a beam of 65 ft 2 in (19.86 m), and a draft of 20 ft 9 in (6.32 m). She displaced 8,188 long tons (8,319 t) standard, which increased to 10,902 long tons (11,077 t) with a full load. To carry out flight operations, the ship had a 257 ft (78 m) hangar deck and a 474 ft (144 m) flight deck. Her compact size necessitated the installation of an aircraft catapult at her bow, and there were two aircraft elevators to facilitate movement of aircraft between the flight and hangar deck: one each fore and aft.

She was powered by four Babcock & Wilcox Express D boilers that raised 285 psi (1,970 kPa) of steam at 577 °F (303 °C). The steam generated by these boilers fed two Skinner Unaflow reciprocating steam engines, delivering 9,000 hp (6,700 kW) to two propeller shafts. This allowed her to reach speeds of 19 kn (35 km/h; 22 mph), with a cruising range of 10,240 nmi (18,960 km; 11,780 mi) at 15 kn (28 km/h; 17 mph). For armament, one 5 in (127 mm)/38 caliber dual-purpose gun was mounted on the stern. Additional anti-aircraft defense was provided by eight Bofors 40 mm (1.57 in) anti-aircraft guns in single mounts and twelve Oerlikon 20 mm (0.79 in) cannons mounted around the perimeter of the deck. By 1945, Casablanca-class carriers had been modified to carry twenty Oerlikon cannons and sixteen Bofors guns; the doubling of the latter was accomplished by putting them into twin mounts. Sensors onboard consisted of a SG surface-search radar and a SK air-search radar.

Although Casablanca-class escort carriers were intended to function with a crew of 860 and an embarked squadron of 50 to 56, the exigencies of wartime often necessitated the inflation of the crew count. They were designed to operate with 27 aircraft, but the hangar deck could accommodate much more during transport or training missions.

== Construction ==
The escort carrier was laid down on 16 December 1943 under a Maritime Commission contract, MC hull 1126, by Kaiser Shipbuilding Company, Vancouver, Washington. She was launched on 10 March; sponsored by Mrs. Alden R. Sanborn; transferred to the United States Navy and commissioned on 15 April 1944, Captain Anthony R. Brady in command.

== Service history ==
After a brief shakedown, Takanis Bay reported to Naval Air Station North Island, San Diego, where she operated in support of carrier training operations. On 22 May, the first landing was made on the carrier's flight deck. Until the end of hostilities with Japan on 15 August 1945, a steady stream of carrier squadrons was trained onboard Takanis Bay, rotating off for service on a frontline carrier once they had finished qualifications. In this period, between 24 May 1944 to 28 August 1945, she qualified a record 2,509 pilots. She also engaged in the most landings of any Casablanca-class carrier: 20,159 landings. This record, at the time, was only surpassed by the venerable frontline fleet carriers Ranger and Saratoga. On 24 July 1945, pilots of VC-20 made 446 landings on a single day. Remarkably, only a single pilot died throughout her career as a training carrier, albeit accidents were frequent.

On 28 August 1945, she left San Diego, bound for Pearl Harbor, where she was assigned to Carrier Transport Squadron, Pacific Fleet. She joined the fleet of carriers repatriating American servicemen from around the Pacific theater. Between 28 August and 3 January 1946, she ferried about 6,500 troops. Firstly, in two trips, she returned 1,300 servicemen from Hawaii to San Diego. Late in September, the carrier was officially assigned to the Operation Magic Carpet fleet. While docked in San Diego, bunks for 800 passengers were installed in the hangar deck. Once modifications were complete, she made two more round trip voyages to Hawaii, along with a trip to the Tokyo Bay area.

Takanis Bay arrived at San Pedro, California, on 2 January 1946. On 3 January, she was released from the "Magic Carpet" fleet, and ordered to Tacoma, Washington. She was moved to Puget Sound in April, where inactivation work was begun, and she was decommissioned on 18 June. Takanis Bay was reclassified CVU-89 on 12 June 1955 and was struck from the Naval Vessel Register on 1 August 1959. She was sold on 29 June 1960 to Hyman-Michaels Company, Chicago, Illinois, for scrap and broken up in Portland, Oregon.

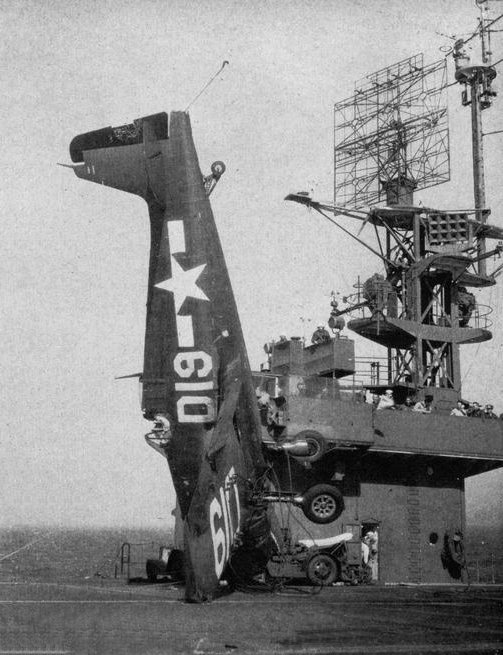
An F6F-5 Hellcat on Takanis Bay after a barrier crash

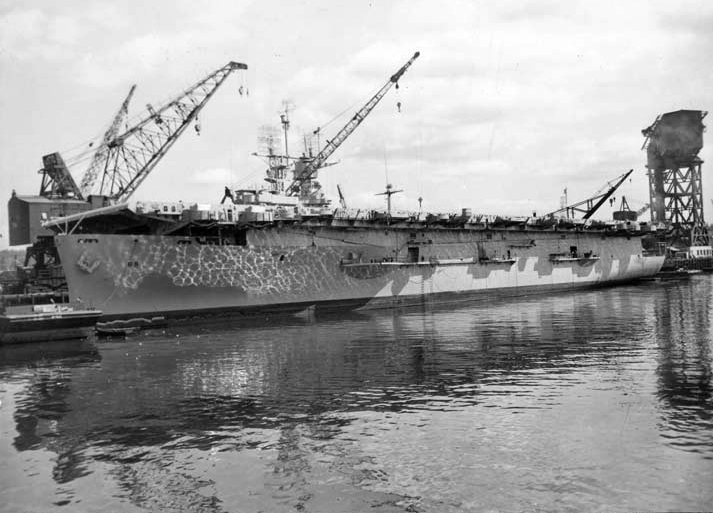
Takanis Bay during her inactivation at the Puget Sound Naval Shipyard, 1946.

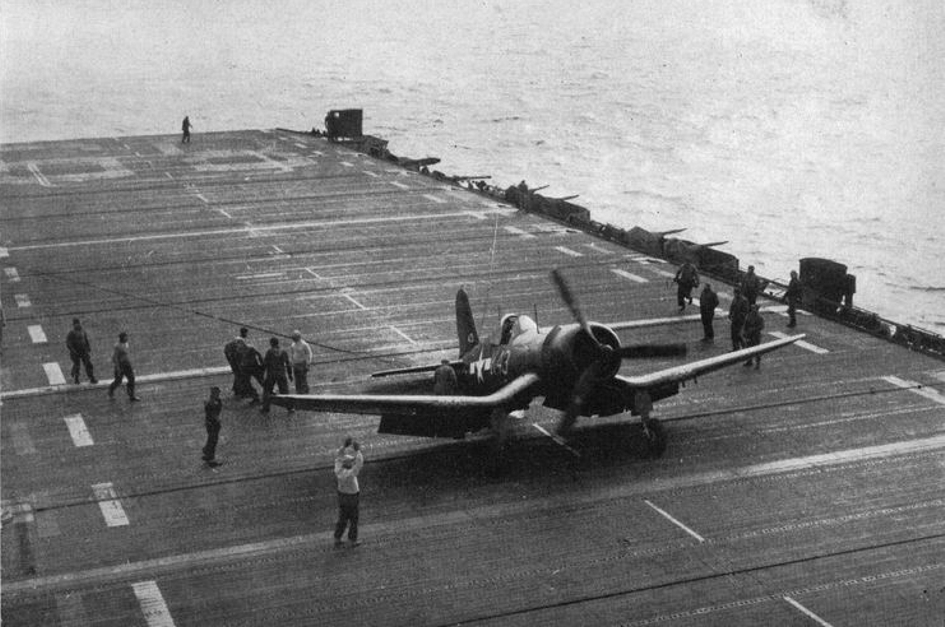
An F4U-1 Corsair making the 5,000th landing aboard Takanis Bay

== Sources ==
=== Online sources ===
- "Takanis Bay (CVE-89)". Dictionary of American Naval Fighting Ships. Naval History and Heritage Command. 27 April 2016. Archived from the original on 2 June 2019. This article incorporates text from this source, which is in the public domain.
- "Kaiser Vancouver, Vancouver WA". www.ShipbuildingHistory.com. 27 November 2010. Archived from the original on 16 June 2019.
- "World Aircraft Carriers List: US Escort Carriers, S4 Hulls". Hazegray.org. 14 December 1998. Archived from the original on 19 November 2021.

=== Bibliography ===
- Adcock, Al (1996), Escort Carriers in Action - Warships No. 9, Carrollton, Texas: Squadron/Signal Publications, ISBN 9780897473569
- Chesneau, Robert; Gardiner, Robert (1980), Conway's All the World's Fighting Ships 1922–1946, London, England: Naval Institute Press, ISBN 9780870219139
- Friedman, Norman (1983), U.S. Aircraft Carriers: An Illustrated Design History, Annapolis, Maryland: Naval Institute Press, ISBN 9780870217395
- Hines, E.G. (1946), A Short History of the U.S.S. Takanis Bay, CVE-89
- Ross, Al (1993), The Escort Carrier Gambier Bay, Anatomy of the Ship, London, England: Conway Maritime Press, ISBN 9781557502353
- Y'Blood, William (2012), The Little Giants: U.S. Escort Carriers Against Japan, Annapolis, Maryland: Naval Institute Press, ISBN 9781612512471
