= William T. Y'Blood =

American historian

- Born: William Thomas Y'Blood; November 12, 1937
- Died: December 16, 2006 (aged 69); Fairfax, Virginia, USA
- Occupation: Historian
- Writing career
- Genre: Non-fiction
- Subject: World War II

William Thomas Y'Blood (November 12, 1937 – December 16, 2006) was an American World War II historian, notable as the author of eight books that have been translated into ten languages.

== Biography ==
Y'Blood's career as a pilot, first in the U.S. Air Force flying Boeing B-47s and later as a commercial pilot for Continental Airlines was reflected in the subjects he chose to write about. His first publication, Stratojet in Action, is a pictorial history of the B-47.

His lifelong interest in World War II led him to begin writing on that topic. Red Sun Setting, his account of the Battle of the Philippine Sea, contains classic descriptions of dogfights and aerial attacks on Japanese carriers. The book was lauded as, "the definitive account of the controversial June 1944 battle."

He turned his focus to escort carriers in his next two books, Hunter-Killer and The Little Giants, earning praise and awards. As one critic from the International Journal of Naval History said in their review of Hunter-Killer, "the book remains a scholarly look at anti-submarine warfare in the Atlantic and an excellent observation of Escort Carriers, the men on them, the planes and pilots that flew off of them, and their heroic contribution towards final victory."

Later in life, Y'Blood took a position with the Air Force History office at the Pentagon as a historian, where he remained until his death in 2006. He turned his attention to other wars, focusing considerable effort on the Korean War and the overlooked role air power played in that conflict.

Y'Blood was married to Carolyn and had two children. He died at Inova Fairfax Hospital in Northern Virginia on December 16, 2006, after suffering a heart attack.

== Bibliography ==
- Stratojet in Action (1977)
- Red Sun Setting (1981)
- Hunter-Killer (1983)
- The Little Giants (1987)
- The Three Wars of Lt. General George E. Stratemeyer (1999)
- MiG Alley: The Fight for Air Superiority (2000)
- Reflections and Remembrances: Veterans of the United States Army Air Forces Reminisce about World War II (2002)
- Down in the Weeds: Close Air Support in Korea (2002)
- Air Commandos Against Japan (2008) *published posthumously*
