= USS Shamrock Bay =

Casablanca-class escort carrier of the US Navy

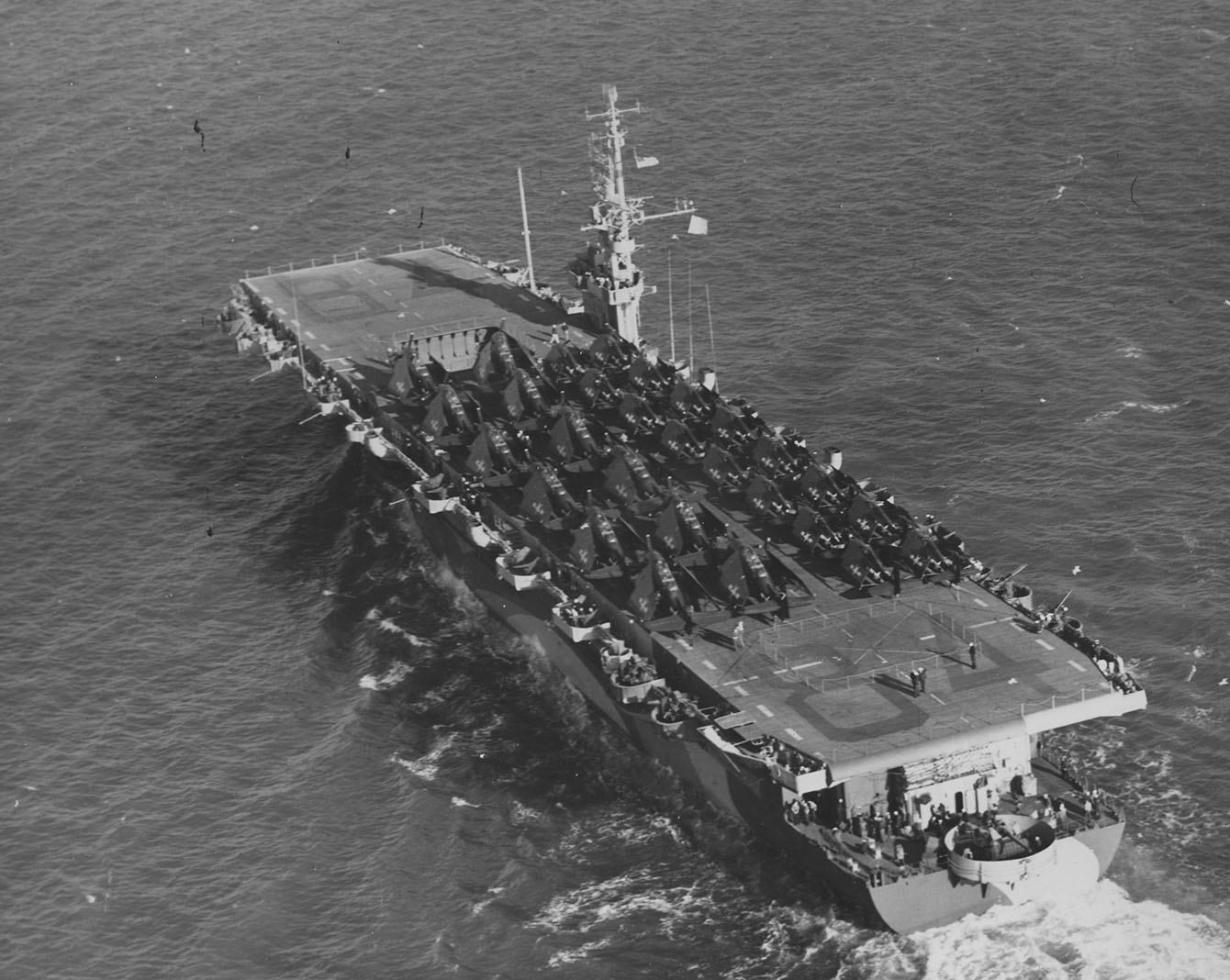
- USS Shamrock Bay underway carrying Composite Squadron (VC) 42 off of Norfolk, Virginia, 11 November 1944.

History

United States
- Name: Shamrock Bay
- Namesake: Shamrock Bay, Baranof Island, Alaska
- Ordered: as a Type S4-S2-BB3 hull, MC hull 1121
- Awarded: 18 June 1942
- Builder: Kaiser Shipyards
- Laid down: 15 November 1943
- Launched: 4 February 1944
- Commissioned: 15 March 1944
- Decommissioned: 6 July 1946
- Stricken: 27 June 1958
- Identification: Hull symbol: CVE-84
- Honors and awards: 3 Battle stars
- Fate: Scrapped in November 1959

General characteristics
- Class & type: Casablanca-class escort carrier
- Displacement: 8,188 long tons (8,319 t) (standard); 10,902 long tons (11,077 t) (full load)
- Length: 512 ft 3 in (156.13 m) (oa); 490 ft (150 m) (wl); 474 ft (144 m) (fd)
- Beam: 65 ft 2 in (19.86 m); 108 ft (33 m) (extreme width)
- Draft: 20 ft 9 in (6.32 m) (max)
- Installed power: 4 × Babcock & Wilcox boilers; 9,000 shp (6,700 kW)
- Propulsion: 2 × Skinner Unaflow reciprocating steam engines; 2 × screws
- Speed: 19 knots (35 km/h; 22 mph)
- Range: 10,240 nmi (18,960 km; 11,780 mi) at 15 kn (28 km/h; 17 mph)
- Complement: Total: 910 – 916 officers and men; Embarked Squadron: 50 – 56; Ship's Crew: 860
- Armament: As designed: 1 × 5 in (127 mm)/38 cal dual-purpose gun; 4 × twin 40 mm (1.57 in) Bofors anti-aircraft guns; 12 × 20 mm (0.79 in) Oerlikon anti-aircraft cannons; Varied, ultimate armament: 1 × 5 in (127 mm)/38 cal dual-purpose gun; 8 × twin 40 mm (1.57 in) Bofors anti-aircraft guns; 20 × 20 mm (0.79 in) Oerlikon anti-aircraft cannons
- Aircraft carried: 27
- Aviation facilities: 1 × catapult; 2 × elevators

Service record
- Part of: United States Pacific Fleet (1944–1946); Atlantic Reserve Fleet (1946-1958)
- Operations: Invasion of Lingayen Gulf; Invasion of Iwo Jima; Battle of Okinawa; Operation Magic Carpet

USS Shamrock Bay (CVE-84) was the thirtieth of fifty Casablanca-class escort carriers built for the United States Navy during World War II. She was named after Shamrock Bay, located within Baranof Island, of the Territory of Alaska. The ship was launched in February 1944, commissioned in March, and served in support of the Invasion of Lingayen Gulf, the Invasion of Iwo Jima and the Battle of Okinawa. Postwar, she participated in Operation Magic Carpet. She was decommissioned in July 1946, when she was mothballed in the Atlantic Reserve Fleet. Ultimately, she was broken up in November 1959.

== Design and description ==
A side profile of the design of Thetis Bay.

Shamrock Bay was a Casablanca-class escort carrier, the most numerous type of aircraft carriers ever built. Built to stem heavy losses during the Battle of the Atlantic, they came into service in late 1943, by which time the U-boat threat was already in retreat. Although some did see service in the Atlantic, the majority were utilized in the Pacific, ferrying aircraft, providing logistics support, and conducting close air support for the island-hopping campaigns. The Casablanca-class carriers were built on the standardized Type S4-S2-BB3 hull, a lengthened variant of the Doyen-class hull, and specifically designed to be mass-produced using welded prefabricated sections. This allowed them to be produced at unprecedented speeds: the final ship of her class, Munda, was delivered to the Navy just 101 days after the laying of her keel.

Shamrock Bay was 512 ft 3 in (156.13 m) long overall (490 ft (150 m) at the waterline), had a beam of 65 ft 2 in (19.86 m), and a draft of 20 ft 9 in (6.32 m). She displaced 8,188 long tons (8,319 t) standard, which increased to 10,902 long tons (11,077 t) with a full load. To carry out flight operations, the ship had a 257 ft (78 m) hangar deck and a 474 ft (144 m) flight deck. Her compact size necessitated the installation of an aircraft catapult at her bow, and there were two aircraft elevators to facilitate movement of aircraft between the flight and hangar deck: one each fore and aft.

She was powered by four Babcock & Wilcox Express D boilers that raised 285 psi (1,970 kPa) of steam at 577 °F (303 °C). The steam generated by these boilers fed two Skinner Unaflow reciprocating steam engines, delivering 9,000 hp (6,700 kW) to two propeller shafts. This allowed her to reach speeds of 19 kn (35 km/h; 22 mph), with a cruising range of 10,240 nmi (18,960 km; 11,780 mi) at 15 kn (28 km/h; 17 mph). For armament, one 5 in (127 mm)/38 caliber dual-purpose gun was mounted on the stern. Additional anti-aircraft defense was provided by eight Bofors 40 mm (1.57 in) anti-aircraft guns in single mounts and twelve Oerlikon 20 mm (0.79 in) cannons mounted around the perimeter of the deck. By 1945, Casablanca-class carriers had been modified to carry twenty Oerlikon cannons and sixteen Bofors guns; the doubling of the latter was accomplished by putting them into twin mounts. Sensors onboard consisted of a SG surface-search radar and a SK air-search radar.

Although Casablanca-class escort carriers were intended to function with a crew of 860 and an embarked squadron of 50 to 56, the exigencies of wartime often necessitated the inflation of the crew count. They were designed to operate with 27 aircraft, but the hangar deck could accommodate much more during transport or training missions.

During the Invasion of Lingayen Gulf, she carried 20 FM-2 Wildcat fighters, 11 TBM-3 Avenger torpedo bombers, and a TBM-3P photo reconnaissance plane for a total of 32 aircraft. However, during the Battle of Okinawa, she carried 18 FM-2 fighters and 12 TBM-3 torpedo bombers for a total of 30 aircraft.

== Construction ==
Shamrock Bay's construction was awarded to Kaiser Shipbuilding Company, Vancouver, Washington under a Maritime Commission contract, on 18 June 1942. She was laid down on 15 November 1943 under the name Shamrock Bay as part of the tradition which named escort carriers after bays or sounds in Alaska. As the thirtieth of a series of fifty Casablanca-class escort carriers, she was laid down as MC hull 1121. She was launched on 4 February 1944, sponsored by Mrs. James R. Dudley, and then transferred to the Navy for commissioning on 15 March 1944, with Captain Frank Trenwith Ward Jr. in command. Upon being commissioned, she received the classification symbol CVE-84, indicating that she was the eighty-fourth escort carrier to be commissioned into the United States Navy.

== Service history ==
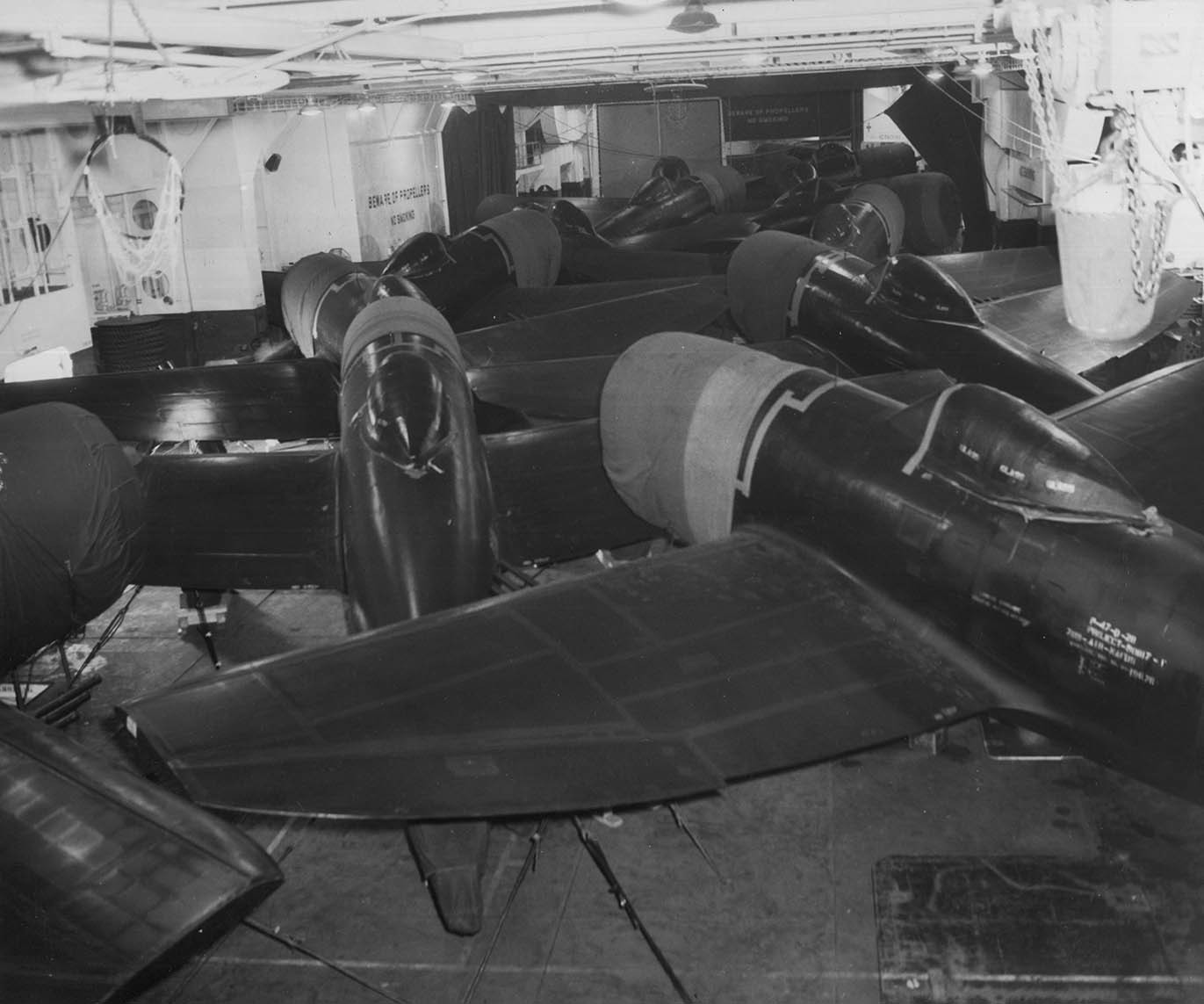
Army Air Corps P-47D variant Thunderbolt fighters are photographed packed into the hangar deck of Shamrock Bay during a transport run in the Atlantic Ocean sometime in July 1944. Note the basketball hoop at the top-left of the image and the movie screen in the center background.

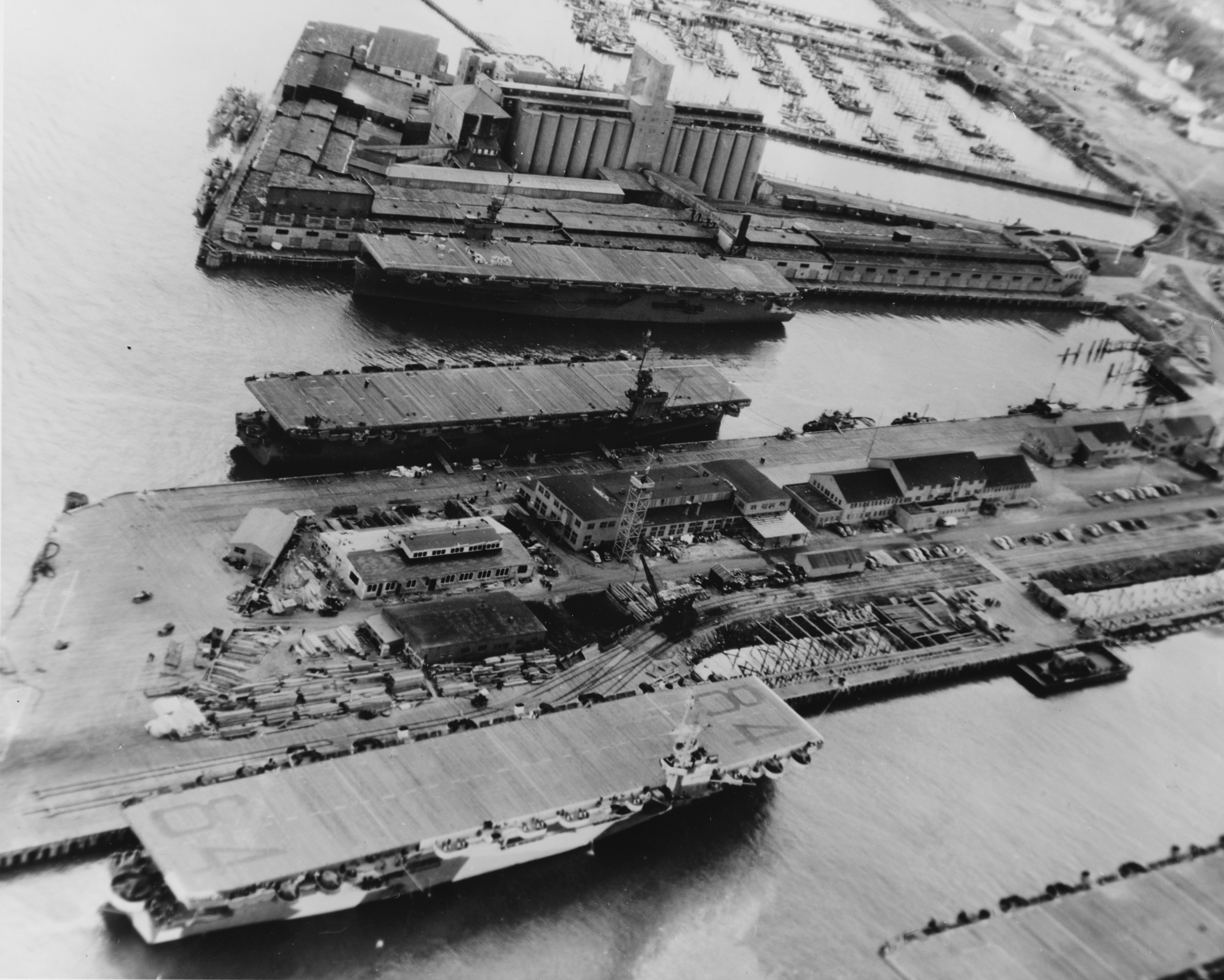
Three Casablanca-class escort carriers berthed at Astoria, Oregon, 6 April 1944. The bottommost carrier is Shamrock Bay.

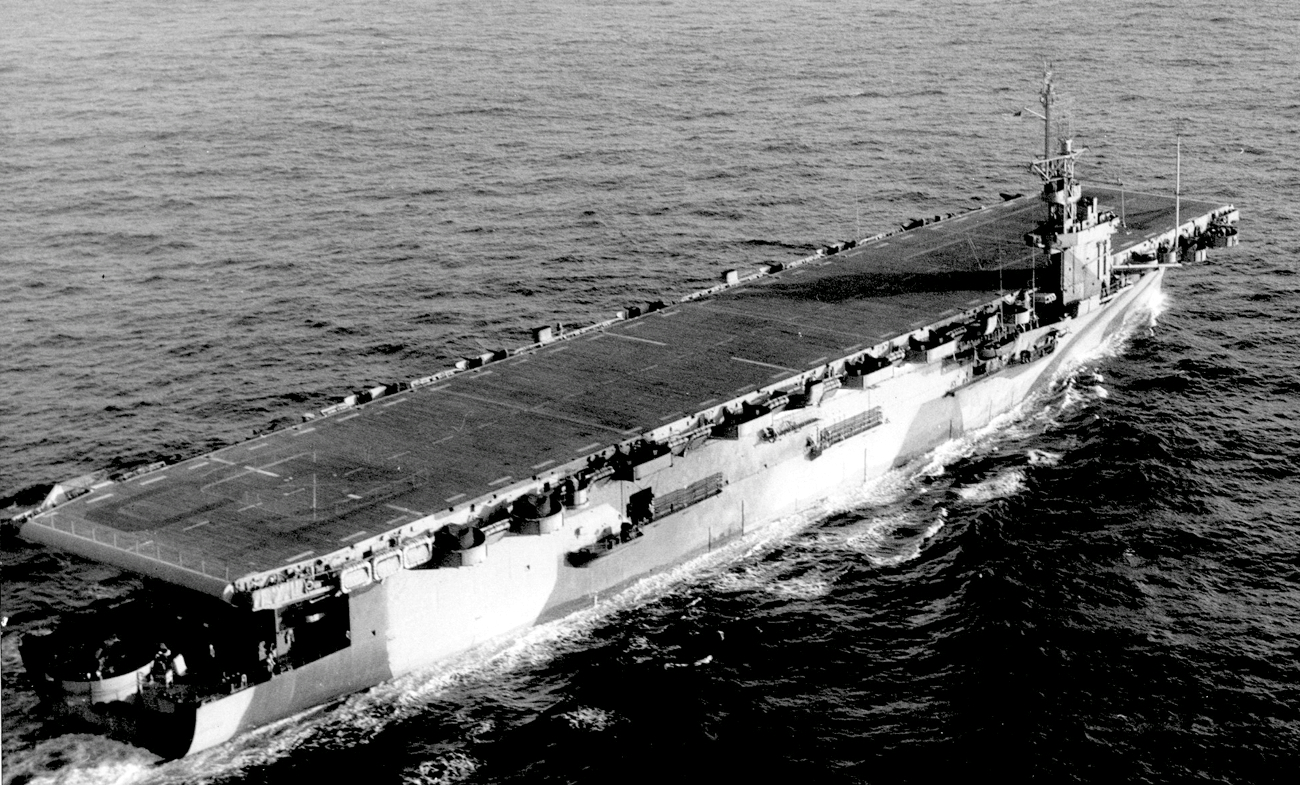
Shamrock Bay's port hull is photographed by a blimp from Airship Patrol Squadron (ZP) 12 off the East Coast on 26 October 1944, as it returns to Norfolk, Virginia.

Upon being commissioned, Shamrock Bay underwent a shakedown cruise down the West Coast, after which she conducted pilot qualifications until June 1944. She was then assigned transport duty within the Atlantic Ocean, first conducting a transport run ferrying fighters and military passengers to Casablanca, French Morocco. She then took on a load of damaged P-40 Warhawk fighters, which she transported back to the United States to be used in training and/or salvaged, as well as a load of aircraft engines, which when brought back to the States, would be overhauled or salvaged. She also took on another load of military passengers back to the East Coast, which consisted mostly of Army Air Corps personnel that had been serving in the China Burma India Theater.

On 27 October, Shamrock Bay had just returned to Norfolk, Virginia, after completing her second transport run, and she was fitting out for anti-submarine operations within the South Atlantic. However, with the loss of her sisters Gambier Bay and St. Lo in the Battle off Samar, U.S. Navy command found it judicious to dispatch Shamrock Bay as a replacement within the Pacific theater. Therefore, after taking onboard Composite Squadron (VC) 42 on 11 November, which consisted of twenty-eight aircraft (16 FM-2 Wildcats and 12 TBM-3 Avengers) to be transported to Pearl Harbor, she sailed for the Pacific Ocean, along with Wake Island.

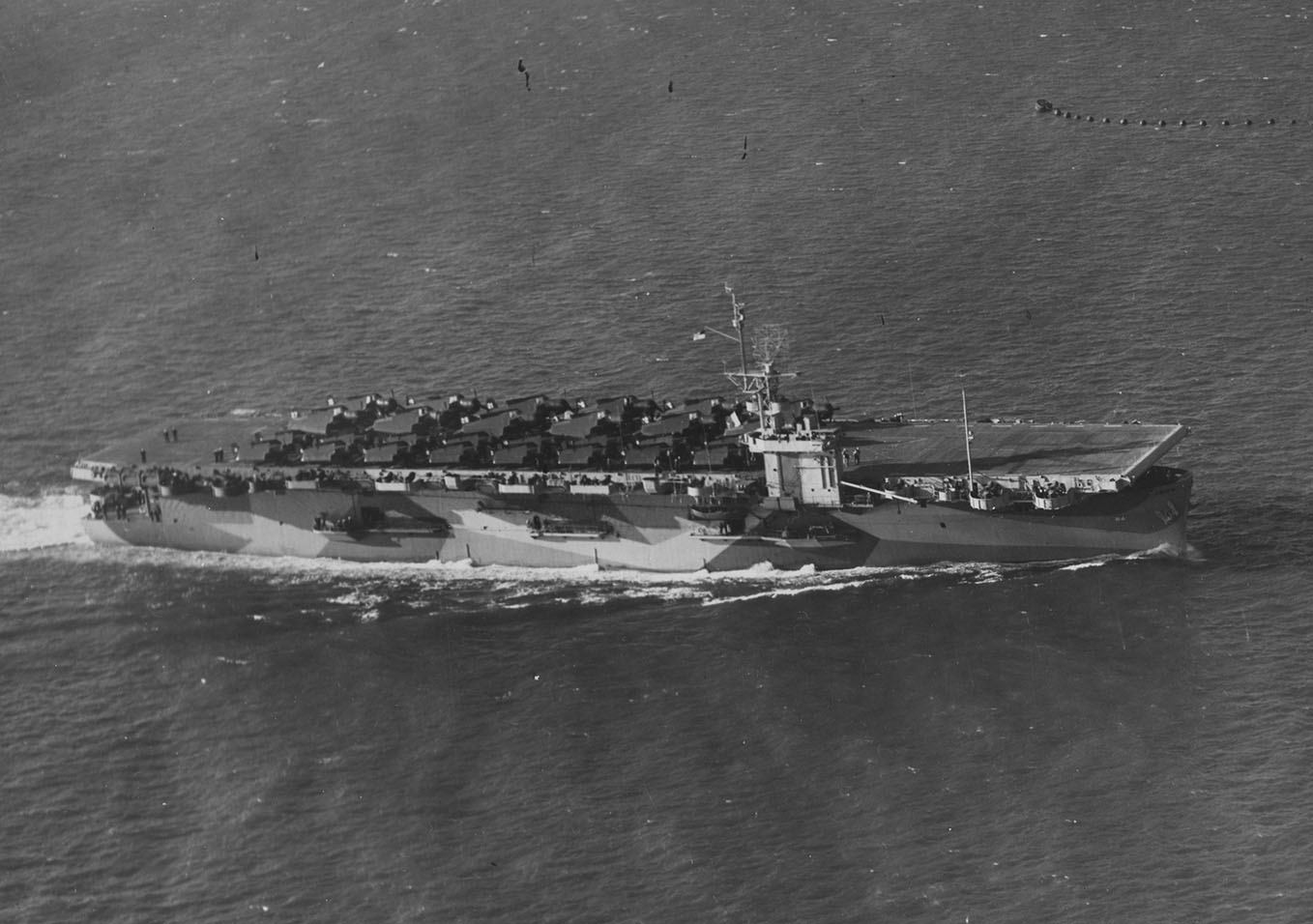
Shamrock Bay underway carrying Composite Squadron (VC) 42 off of Norfolk, Virginia, 11 November 1944

Shamrock Bay passed through the Panama Canal on 18 November, and proceeding northwards, she docked at San Diego, California on 27 November. There, on 2 December, she embarked Composite Squadron (VC) 93. She arrived at Pearl Harbor on 9 December, where she unloaded her aircraft contingent, and where she also took on Composite Squadron (VC) 94, which was to be her actual fighting aircraft contingent. On 11 December, she proceeded westwards, delivering some aircraft to Johnston Atoll en route. She arrived at Seeadler Harbor, on Manus Island of the Admiralty Islands on 22 December, where she joined with the 7th Fleet.

On 31 December, the American fleet departed from Seeadler Harbor, with the escort carriers being placed in Task Group 77.4, under the command of Rear Admiral Calvin T. Durgin, Shamrock Bay and her sister Kitkun Bay were assigned to Rear Admiral Ralph A. Ofstie's Task Unit 77.4.3, the Lingayen Protective Group. En route, until 8 January 1945, when the American fleet arrived within Lingayen Gulf, the task unit's aircraft contingent provided an air screen for the invasion force as it transited towards north Luzon. During the latter half the transit, her aircraft screen began engaging aerial resistance, which increased as the fleet moved north. On 4 January, her sister Ommaney Bay was crippled by a kamikaze attack and subsequently scuttled. On 5 January, another sister, Manila Bay was damaged by a pair of two kamikazes, and on 8 January, yet another sister, Kadashan Bay was hit by a kamikaze, which forced two of her aircraft to land onboard Shamrock Bay. The sinking of Ommaney Bay resulted in Shamrock Bay being transferred to Task Unit 77.4.2, the San Fabian Carrier Group under Rear Admiral Felix B. Stump. This meant that she would also have to assume some of her assigned duties, such as providing close air support for the landing U.S. forces. On 9 January, Shamrock Bay transferred one of her TBM-3 torpedo bombers to Manila Bay to help replace the seven torpedo bombers that Manila Bay had lost during her kamikaze attack.

On the late afternoon of 10 January, Task Unit 77.4.3 was proceeding behind and covering Task Force 79, the Lingayen Attack Force. At 18:06, a group of aircraft were spotted approaching the carriers from the southwest, at a distance of about 20 mi (32 km). Eight fighters from Kitkun Bay and four fighters from Shamrock Bay were scrambled to meet this threat, and although half of the fighters missed their target, six fighters from Kitkun Bay were able to intercept the kamikazes, downing many of them. However, two kamikazes were able to pass through the screen unmolested, making their way towards the two escort carriers. At 18:55, as darkness approached, the two planes began making their dives and were met by intense flak from the two carriers. One of the planes, apparently discouraged by the anti-aircraft fire, veered off, but the other plane, a Nakajima Ki-43 "Oscar", which first appeared to be headed towards Shamrock Bay, plunged towards Kitkun Bay instead, smashing into the latter's port at the waterline at a high velocity, inflicting severe damage. Many of her aircraft that were already in the air were thus compelled to land onboard Shamrock Bay, and Rear Admiral Ofstie was forced to transfer his flag to Shamrock Bay as well.

After arriving on 8 January, until 17 January, when the escort carriers left Lingayen Gulf, Shamrock Bay, aside from providing an air screen against kamikazes, also conducted flight operations in close support of the ground invasion. 571 sorties were logged by Composite Squadron 94, 180 of which were flown over Luzon. On 17 January, she joined Task Group 77.14 and sailed for Ulithi Atoll in the Caroline Islands, where she joined Task Unit 50.8.25, which was assigned to provide air cover for Task Group 50.8, the Logistics Support Group, which provided replacement aircraft, supplies, and replacement personnel to the Fast Carrier Task Force. On 16 February, she departed Ulithi, and she arrived off of Iwo Jima, along with the replenishment carriers, on 19 February, just as the first landings were taking place. Assigned to group Baker of the Logistics Support Group, she, along with Makassar Strait was responsible for providing air cover for the aircraft deliveries of Bougainville, Admiralty Islands, Attu, and Windham Bay.

On 5 March, she returned to Ulithi in preparation for the planned landings on Okinawa Island. On 13 March, she steamed for the Ryukyu Islands as a part of Task Unit 50.8.13, with the Farragut-class destroyers Dewey and Aylwin providing a physical screen for Shamrock Bay. As with the Invasion of Iwo Jima, Shamrock Bay provided air cover for the Logistics Support Group. She was detached from Task Group 50.8 on 7 April, shortly after the main landings on Northern Okinawa, whereupon she joined Task Unit 52.1.1, trading places with Savo Island. Shortly after being transferred, Shamrock Bay commenced close air support operations over Okinawa.

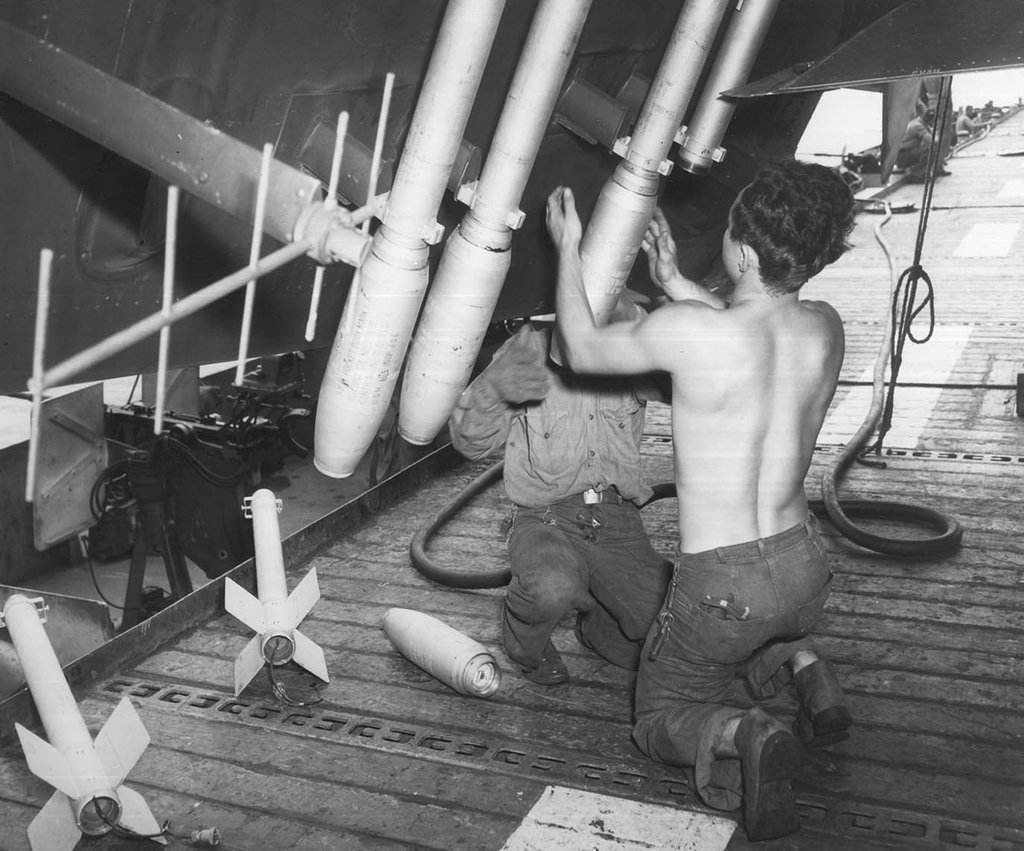
Rockets are loaded onto the folded wing of a TBM-3 Avenger of Composite Squadron 96 on the flight deck of Shamrock Bay in preparation for strikes to be conducted in support of the Battle of Okinawa. Note the extended Yagi-Uda antenna visible on the left side of the photo.

On 16 April, four of Shamrock Bay's FM-2 fighters were dispatched to help the Allen M. Sumner-class destroyer USS Laffey (DD-724), which was under heavy attack from kamikazes about 50 mi (80 km) north of Okinawa. The four fighters that Shamrock Bay dispatched shot down six of the threatening kamikazes, but they were forced to withdraw due to the depletion of their fuel and ammunition. Laffey was later saved by the intervention of twelve Marine Corps Vought F4U Corsair fighter-bombers.

Shamrock Bay remained at station in support of the operations on Okinawa until 11 May, with only a few short interruptions to take on supplies and ammunition at Kerama Retto. During this period, on 20 April, Captain James Edward Leeper took over command of the vessel. On 11 May, she sailed for Guam in the Marianas Islands, and upon arriving, she took on munitions and supplies and her aircraft contingent was rotated, with Composite Squadron 94 rotating off, and Composite Squadron 96 rotating on. On 28 May, she departed Apra Harbor to return to duty off of Okinawa, this time as a part of Task Unit 32.1.1. Immediately after returning, Shamrock Bay rode out Typhoon Connie, but she suffered no serious damage. She continued flight operations until mid-June, when she headed for the Philippines. Over 1,200 sorties were logged by Composite Squadron 96 in support of the Okinawa campaign.

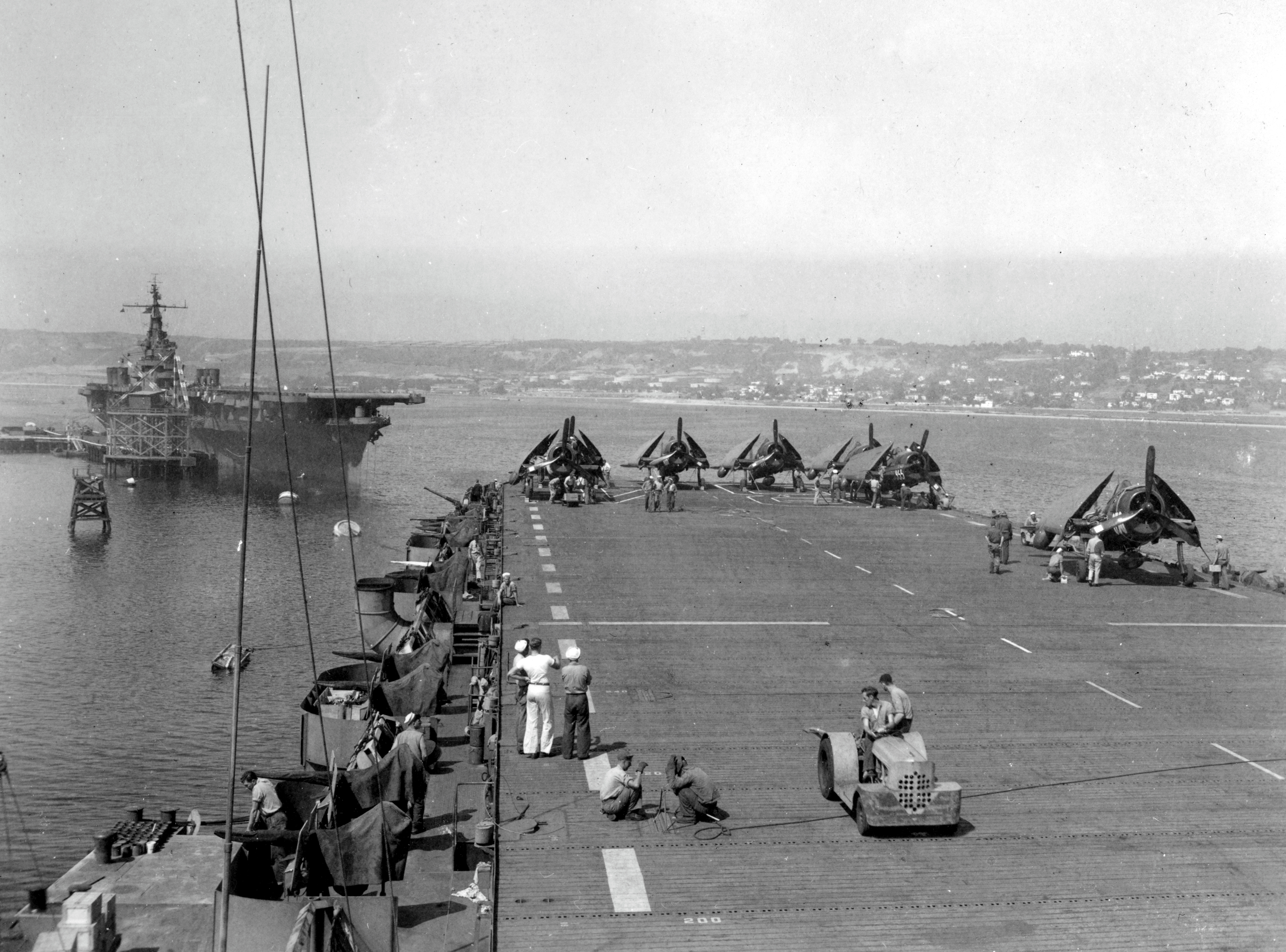
In the foreground, aircraft are photographed being loaded onto the flight deck of Shamrock Bay at Naval Air Station North Island, San Diego, on 14 August 1945. The fleet carrier Ranger is docked in the background.

Shamrock Bay arrived within San Pedro Bay on 27 June, and in early July, she transferred some of her aircraft contingent to Guiuan Airfield. On 5 July, she sailed for Guam again, where she took on a load of aircraft engines, which were to be ferried to the United States for overhaul, and she arrived at San Diego on 27 July. There, the rest of Composite Squadron 96 was disembarked, and her crew began a period of availability that ended just before the Surrender of Japan was announced on 15 August.

=== Post-war ===
Following the end of the war, Shamrock Bay first made a transport run to Guam, delivering aircraft to the island and then returning vehicles to the West Coast. Upon returning, she then joined the "Magic Carpet" fleet, which repatriated U.S. servicemen from throughout the Pacific. She unloaded her unnecessary aviation stores and her aviation personnel at Naval Air Station Alameda, and on 20 October, she headed to Pearl Harbor to conduct her first "Magic Carpet" run, ferrying men of the 4th Marine Division back to the West Coast. She finished that run at San Diego on 2 November, and then made two transpacific "Magic Carpet" runs, one to Okinawa, and another to Honshu. She finished her third run at Seattle, Washington on 26 January 1946, whereupon she was released from the "Magic Carpet" fleet. She proceeded southwards back to Alameda on 2 February, and on 7 February, she steamed for the East Coast for inactivation work.

Shamrock Bay arrived at Boston on 1 March, where she underwent overhaul, and she was subsequently decommissioned and mothballed on 6 July 1946, joining the Boston group of the Atlantic Reserve Fleet, mooring at the South Boston Naval Annex. On 12 June 1955, she was redesignated as a utility aircraft carrier, receiving the hull symbol CVU-84. She was struck from the Navy list on 27 June 1958, and in May 1958, she was sold for scrapping to the Hyman-Michaels Co., of Chicago. She was ultimately broken up in Hong Kong during November 1959. Shamrock Bay received three battle stars for her World War II service.

== Sources ==
=== Online sources ===
- "'Shamrock Bay' (CVE-84)". Dictionary of American Naval Fighting Ships. Naval History and Heritage Command. 27 April 2016. Archived from the original on 22 October 2020. This article incorporates text from this source, which is in the public domain.
- "Kaiser Vancouver, Vancouver WA". www.ShipbuildingHistory.com. 27 November 2010. Archived from the original on 16 June 2019.
- "World Aircraft Carriers List: US Escort Carriers, S4 Hulls". Hazegray.org. 14 December 1998. Archived from the original on 19 November 2021.
- Maksel, Rebecca (14 August 2012). "How Do You Name an Aircraft Carrier?". Air & Space/Smithsonian.

=== Bibliography ===
- Adcock, Al (1996), Escort Carriers in Action - Warships No. 9, Carrollton, Texas: Squadron/Signal Publications, ISBN 9780897473569
- Chesneau, Robert; Gardiner, Robert (1980), Conway's All the World's Fighting Ships 1922–1946, London, England: Naval Institute Press, ISBN 9780870219139
- Friedman, Norman (1983), U.S. Aircraft Carriers: An Illustrated Design History, Annapolis, Maryland: Naval Institute Press, ISBN 9780870217395
- Ross, Al (1993), The Escort Carrier Gambier Bay, Anatomy of the Ship, London, England: Conway Maritime Press, ISBN 9781557502353
- Y'Blood, William (2012), The Little Giants: U.S. Escort Carriers Against Japan, Annapolis, Maryland: Naval Institute Press, ISBN 9781612512471
