= USS Windham Bay =

Casablanca-class escort carrier of the US Navy

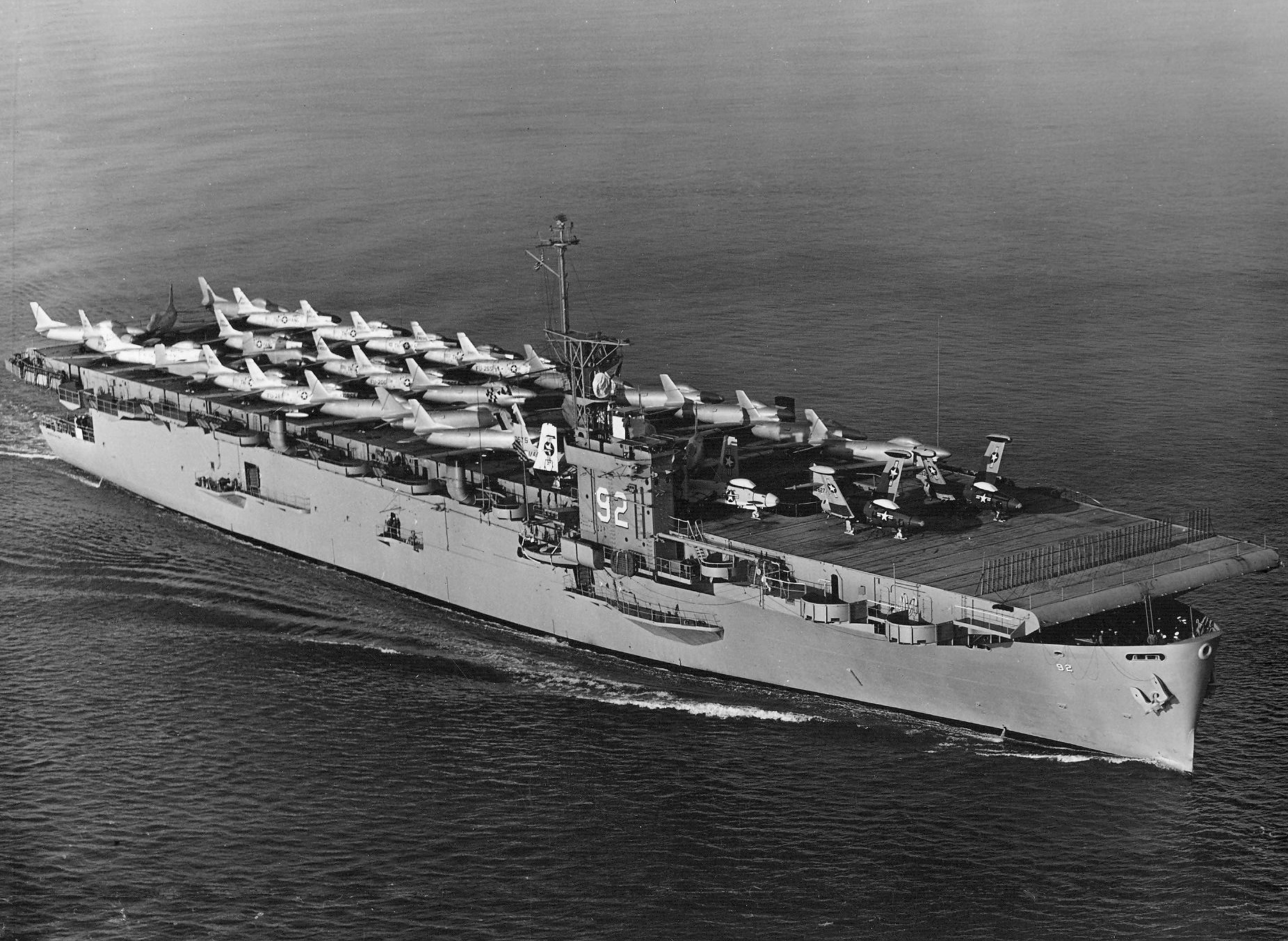
- USS Windham Bay passes under the Golden Gate Bridge, circa 1958. On her flight deck is a load of mainly North American F-86D Sabres.

History

United States
- Name: Windham Bay
- Namesake: Windham Bay, Tongass National Forest, Alaska
- Ordered: as a Type S4-S2-BB3 hull, MCE hull 1129
- Awarded: 18 June 1942
- Builder: Kaiser Shipyards
- Laid down: 5 January 1944
- Launched: 29 March 1944
- Commissioned: 3 May 1944
- Decommissioned: 23 August 1946
- Recommissioned: 28 October 1950
- Decommissioned: January 1959
- Stricken: 1 February 1959
- Identification: Hull symbol: CVE-92
- Honors and awards: 3 Battle stars
- Fate: Scrapped in February 1961

General characteristics
- Class & type: Casablanca-class escort carrier
- Displacement: 8,188 long tons (8,319 t) (standard); 10,902 long tons (11,077 t) (full load)
- Length: 512 ft 3 in (156.13 m) (oa); 490 ft (150 m) (wl); 474 ft (144 m) (fd)
- Beam: 65 ft 2 in (19.86 m); 108 ft (33 m) (extreme width)
- Draft: 20 ft 9 in (6.32 m) (max)
- Installed power: 4 × Babcock & Wilcox boilers; 9,000 shp (6,700 kW)
- Propulsion: 2 × Skinner Unaflow reciprocating steam engines; 2 × screws
- Speed: 19 knots (35 km/h; 22 mph)
- Range: 10,240 nmi (18,960 km; 11,780 mi) at 15 kn (28 km/h; 17 mph)
- Complement: Total: 910 – 916 officers and men; Embarked Squadron: 50 – 56; Ship's Crew: 860
- Armament: As designed: 1 × 5 in (127 mm)/38 cal dual-purpose gun; 4 × twin 40 mm (1.57 in) Bofors anti-aircraft guns; 12 × 20 mm (0.79 in) Oerlikon anti-aircraft cannons; Varied, ultimate armament: 1 × 5 in (127 mm)/38 cal dual-purpose gun; 8 × twin 40 mm (1.57 in) Bofors anti-aircraft guns; 20 × 20 mm (0.79 in) Oerlikon anti-aircraft cannons
- Aircraft carried: 27
- Aviation facilities: 1 × catapult; 2 × elevators

Service record
- Part of: United States Pacific Fleet (1944–1946); Pacific Reserve Fleet (1946–1950); United States Pacific Fleet (1950–1959); Pacific Reserve Fleet (1959)
- Operations: Invasion of Iwo Jima; Battle of Okinawa; Operation Magic Carpet; Korean War

USS Windham Bay (CVE-92) was the thirty-eighth of fifty Casablanca-class escort carriers built for the United States Navy during World War II. She was named after Windham Bay, within Tongass National Forest, of the Territory of Alaska. The ship was launched in March 1944, commissioned in May, and served as a replenishment and transport carrier throughout the Invasion of Iwo Jima and the Battle of Okinawa. Postwar, she participated in Operation Magic Carpet, repatriating U.S. servicemen from throughout the Pacific. She was decommissioned in August 1946, when she was mothballed in the Pacific Reserve Fleet. With the outbreak of the Korean War, however, she was called back to service, continuing to serve as a transport and utility carrier until 1959, when she was once again decommissioned. Ultimately, she was broken up in February 1961.

== Design and description ==
A side profile of the design of Thetis Bay.

Windham Bay was a Casablanca-class escort carrier, the most numerous type of aircraft carriers ever built. Built to stem heavy losses during the Battle of the Atlantic, they came into service in late 1943, by which time the U-boat threat was already in retreat. Although some did see service in the Atlantic, the majority were utilized in the Pacific, ferrying aircraft, providing logistics support, and conducting close air support for the island-hopping campaigns. The Casablanca-class carriers were built on the standardized Type S4-S2-BB3 hull, a lengthened variant of the Doyen-class hull, and specifically designed to be mass-produced using welded prefabricated sections. This allowed them to be produced at unprecedented speeds: the final ship of her class, Munda, was delivered to the Navy just 101 days after the laying of her keel.

Windham Bay was 512 ft 3 in (156.13 m) long overall (490 ft (150 m) at the waterline), had a beam of 65 ft 2 in (19.86 m), and a draft of 20 ft 9 in (6.32 m). She displaced 8,188 long tons (8,319 t) standard, which increased to 10,902 long tons (11,077 t) with a full load. To carry out flight operations, the ship had a 257 ft (78 m) hangar deck and a 474 ft (144 m) flight deck. Her compact size necessitated the installation of an aircraft catapult at her bow, and there were two aircraft elevators to facilitate movement of aircraft between the flight and hangar deck: one each fore and aft.

She was powered by four Babcock & Wilcox Express D boilers that raised 285 psi (1,970 kPa) of steam at 577 °F (303 °C). The steam generated by these boilers fed two Skinner Unaflow reciprocating steam engines, delivering 9,000 hp (6,700 kW) to two propeller shafts. This allowed her to reach speeds of 19 kn (35 km/h; 22 mph), with a cruising range of 10,240 nmi (18,960 km; 11,780 mi) at 15 kn (28 km/h; 17 mph). For armament, one 5 in (127 mm)/38 caliber dual-purpose gun was mounted on the stern. Additional anti-aircraft defense was provided by eight Bofors 40 mm (1.57 in) anti-aircraft guns in single mounts and twelve Oerlikon 20 mm (0.79 in) cannons mounted around the perimeter of the deck. By 1945, Casablanca-class carriers had been modified to carry twenty Oerlikon cannons and sixteen Bofors guns; the doubling of the latter was accomplished by putting them into twin mounts. Sensors onboard consisted of a SG surface-search radar and a SK air-search radar.

Although Casablanca-class escort carriers were intended to function with a crew of 860 and an embarked squadron of 50 to 56, the exigencies of wartime often necessitated the inflation of the crew count. They were designed to operate with 27 aircraft, but the hangar deck could accommodate much more during transport or training missions.

== Construction ==
Her construction was awarded to Kaiser Shipbuilding Company, Vancouver, Washington under a Maritime Commission contract, on 18 June 1942. The escort carrier was laid down on 5 January 1944 under the name Windham Bay, as part of a tradition which named escort carriers after bays or sounds in Alaska. She was laid down as MC hull 1129, the thirty-eighth of a series of fifty Casablanca-class escort carriers. She therefore received the classification symbol CVE-92, indicating that she was the ninety-second escort carrier to be commissioned into the United States Navy. She was launched on 29 March 1944; sponsored by Mrs. Henry M. Cooper; transferred to the Navy and commissioned on 3 May 1944, with Captain Charles William Oexle in command.

== Service history ==
=== World War II ===
Upon being commissioned, Windham Bay underwent a shakedown cruise down the West Coast to San Diego, arriving on 6 June. She then briefly conducted air qualifications and catapult trials off the southern California coast, before taking on a load of aircraft and passengers bound for Hawaii. On 12 June, she left port, arriving within Pearl Harbor on 19 June, trading her cargo for another load, this time bound for the Marshall Islands. She left Pearl Harbor on 25 June, arriving at Majuro Atoll in the Marshall Islands on 2 July. She then sailed westwards to Kwajalein Atoll, also within the Marshalls. There, she took on the aircraft and personnel of Marine Night Fighter Squadron 532 (VMF(N)-532), and steamed for the Mariana Islands. The squadron arrived on Saipan, which had recently been secured, by flying off of her flight deck, and she put into Garapan anchorage to unload the squadron's gear.

Whilst in anchorage, Windham Bay loaded up a squadron of captured Japanese aircraft, and proceeded back to Hawaii. She returned to Pearl Harbor on 10 July, and remained in port for fifteen days, before departing for the West Coast on 25 July. She returned to port in San Diego on 31 July, and she began overhaul at San Pedro, where additional anti-aircraft armaments were retrofitted.

This process took up the entire month of August, and Windham Bay returned to sea on 1 September, with a load of aircraft bound for Emirau and Manus, of the Admiralty Islands. She arrived at Emirau in mid-September, and at Manus on 18 September. After unloading her aircraft, she took on a load of passengers and steamed for Espiritu Santo, of the New Hebrides, and upon completing this task, she took on another load of aircraft, returning to Manus on 5 October. She then visited Guadalcanal, of the Solomon Islands, before heading back to the West Coast. Proceeding via Espiritu Santo, she arrived back in San Diego on 20 October. She then made another transport mission to the South Pacific in November, transporting aircraft to Manus and collecting about 350 casualties from the Palau campaign at Guadalcanal on 24 November for transport back to San Diego.

Upon returning to port in San Diego on 10 December, Windham Bay remained inactive until 27 December, when she resumed transporting aircraft. During this stay, Lieutenant (temporarily promoted to Commander) Theophilus Horner Moore assumed temporary command of the carrier until it arrived at Pearl Harbor. Proceeding westwards, she transported a load of aircraft to Pearl Harbor, arriving on 2 January 1945 before taking on a load of F4U Corsairs. There, Captain Maxwell Franklin Leslie took over permanent command of Windham Bay. Leaving port on 5 January, she headed to Midway Atoll in the Hawaiian Islands, arriving on 9 January, where she unloaded her cargo. The following day, she left Midway, returning to Pearl Harbor on 13 January. She left port on 1 February, this time as a replenishment carrier, providing replacement aircraft, parts, and supplies for the frontline Fast Carrier Task Force of the Third Fleet, which at the time was preparing to provide support for the planned invasion of Iwo Jima. On her way out towards the Central Pacific, Windham Bay stopped at Enewetak Atoll in the Marshall Islands, before steaming for Ulithi Atoll in the Caroline Islands.

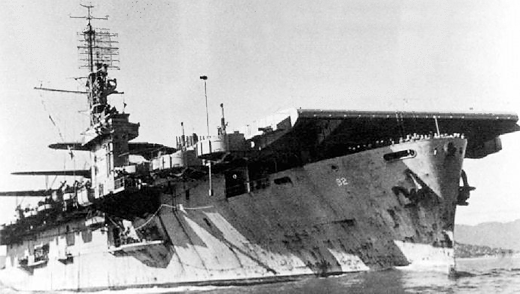
Windham Bay underway sometime in 1945. It appears that three Martin PBM Mariner flying boats are stored upon her aft flight deck.

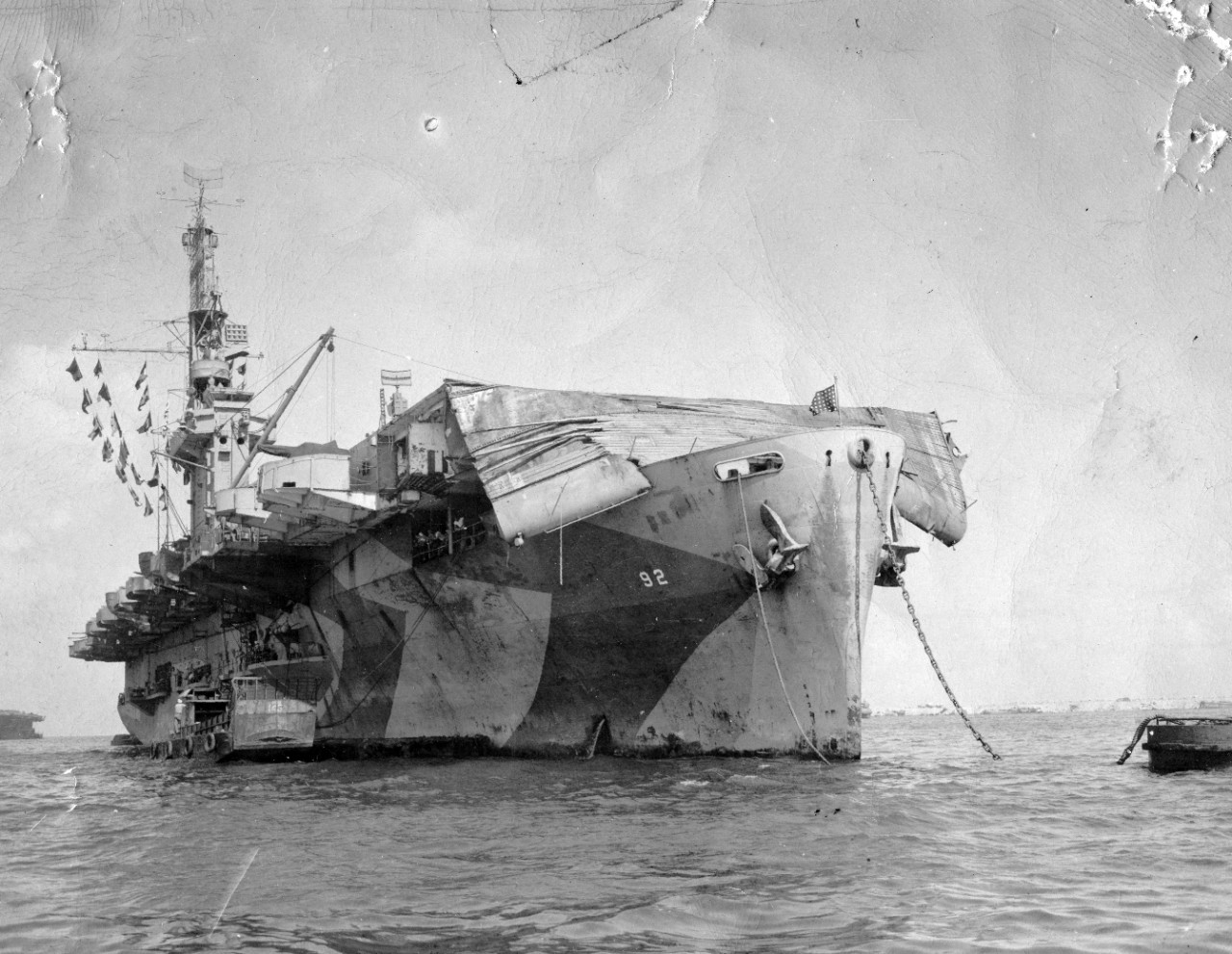
Windham Bay displaying severe flight deck damage from Typhoon Connie whilst moored in Apra Harbor, 11 June 1945.

Upon taking on board the cargo required to sustain her replenishment duties, Windham Bay took to sea, as a part of Task Unit 50.8.4, the CVE Plane Transport Unit, along with her sister ships Admiralty Islands, Bougainville, and Attu. As a part of Task Group 50.8, the Logistics Support Group, the replenishment carriers were under the command of Rear Admiral Donald B. Beary. En route, the carriers were screened by the destroyer escorts Greiner, Sanders, and Wyman. She arrived off Iwo Jima on 19 February, whereupon she began delivering replacement aircraft and crews to the fleet carriers conducting operations over the island, with the transferring aircraft being screened by the fighter contingents of Makassar Strait and Shamrock Bay. Task Unit 50.8.4 first conducted deliveries to Task Groups 58.1, 58.4, and 58.5 on 19 February, conducted deliveries to Task Groups 58.2 and 58.3 the following day, and then deliveries to all the Task Groups excepting 58.5 on 21 February. Her main duties finished, Windham Bay continued delivering a trickle of planes until 1 March, when her Task Group returned to replenish at Ulithi. In total, the four escort carriers had delivered 254 aircraft and 65 plane crews to the fleet carriers, the majority of which were transferred on the first three days.

Later, upon having replenished, Task Group 50.8.4. took to sea again, and beginning on 1 April, in addition to resupplying the Fast Carrier Task Force, the escort carriers also shouldered the burden of providing replacement aircraft and supplies for the CVEs providing air cover for the landings on Okinawa. Taking advantage of the Kerama Islands, which had been recently captured on 26 March, the escort carriers were able to quickly replenish on bombs and ammunition, minimizing the amount of time spent away from the frontline carriers.

By the early morning of 5 June, Windham Bay, along with the ships of Task Group 38.1 and Task Group 30.8, was trapped in the path of Typhoon Connie, which was proceeding northwards, and on a course to the east of Okinawa. Admiral William Halsey Jr., which had already led the Third Fleet into the deadly Typhoon Cobra in December 1944, now managed to lead the Third Fleet yet again into the eyewall of another deadly storm, ignoring reports by Rear Admiral Beary, who was convinced that Halsey's eastwardly course would put his carriers into the storm. By the time this had become evident, the replenishment carriers had already found themselves navigating independently of each other. As Windham Bay neared the center of the storm, at around 3:00, her crew began to witness the aircraft stored upon the flight deck work free of their restraints and slip into the sea.

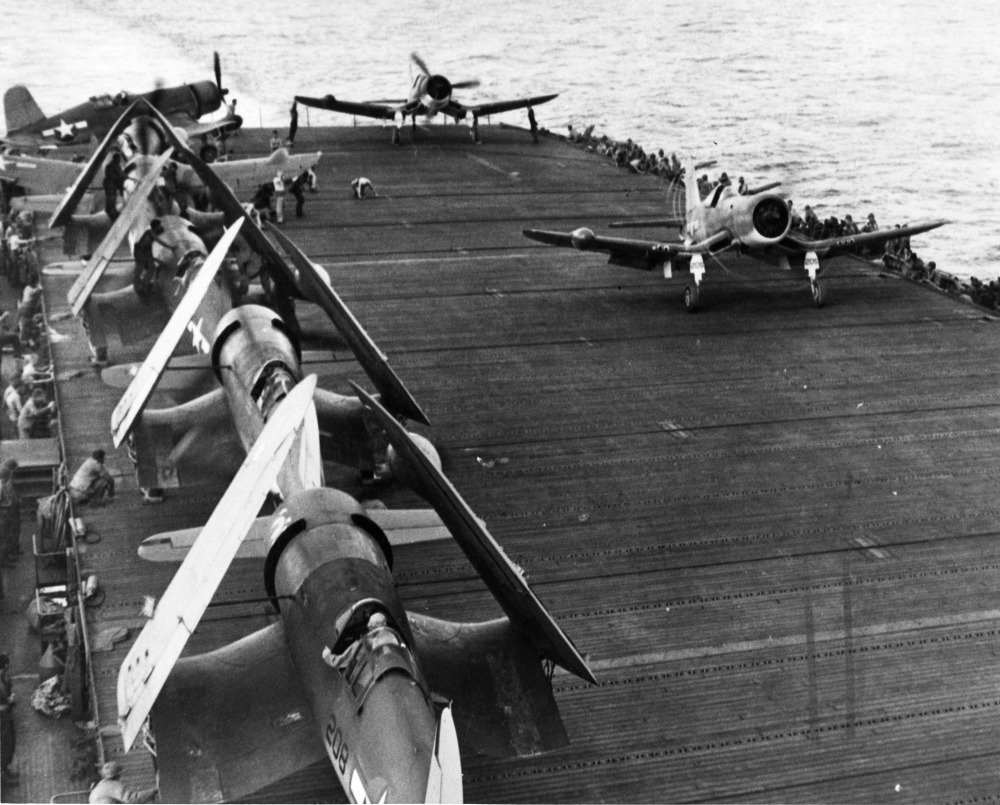
F4U-2 Corsairs of Marine Night Fighting Squadron 523 (VMF(N)-532) photographed being transported on the flight deck of Windham Bay, 12 July 1945. Two Corsairs are shown preparing to launch, perhaps to be transferred.

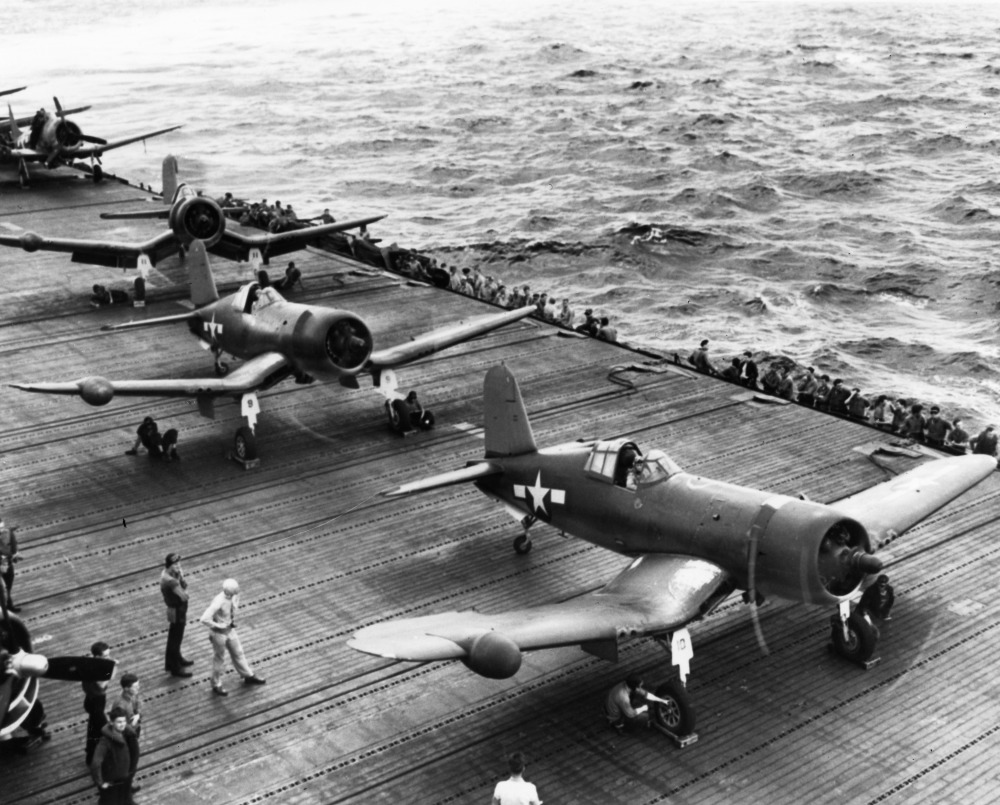
Another perspective of the Corsairs preparing to launch.

A few minutes later, Windham Bay entered the eyewall. The carrier's wind-measuring system was quickly blown away by the gusts, but the crew estimated the winds to be gusting at around 127 kn (235 km/h; 146 mph). In addition, waves estimated as towering some 75 ft (23 m) high broke over the carrier. Despite the fact that her forward aircraft elevator was up, water seeped through the edges of the elevator, flooding the elevator well with 4 ft (1.2 m) of water and temporarily taking it out of commission. At 3:55, as the carrier crested over a particularly high swell, the two forwardmost 40 mm Bofors guns, along with the forward lookout platform, were ejected off the ship. Simultaneously, the forwardmost 20 ft (6.1 m) of her flight deck collapsed onto her forecastle, damaging both her hangar deck and aircraft elevator.

The damage sustained during the typhoon necessitated repairs, and Windham Bay was therefore relieved of her replenishment duties. Heading eastwards, she stopped at the Marianas on 16 June on her way to Oahu, where quick repairs were made. In addition, she took on a load of F4U-2 Corsairs for transport. Stopping at Pearl Harbor from 25 June to 27 June, she entered port at San Diego on 11 July for extensive repairs, which took until late August to finish, after the Japanese surrender had been announced.

On 26 August, with her repairs having concluded, Windham Bay left San Diego harbor, with Marine Fighter Squadron 312 (VMF-312) on board, bound for Guam. Stopping briefly at Pearl Harbor, she arrived in Apra Harbor on 15 September. Having unloaded her passengers and cargo, she steamed for Samar and Leyte, within the Philippines, arriving on 19 September, taking on passengers, planes, and equipment for transport back to Hawaii. She departed Leyte on 24 September, stopped at Guam on 27 September, and arrived back at Oahu on 7 October. She left port on 8 October, and arrived back in San Diego harbor on 14 October.

Whilst in port, Windham Bay joined the Operation Magic Carpet fleet, which repatriated U.S. servicemen from around the Pacific. On 19 October, the carrier left on her first run, a voyage which ended at San Pedro. She left for another run on 13 November, arriving at Samar on 26 November, leaving on 28 November. Pausing at Pearl Harbor, she arrived in Port Hueneme, California on 17 December. She then proceeded a short ways southward back to San Pedro port, where she remained until the New Year.

On 8 January 1946, Windham Bay departed San Pedro again, making a round trip to Pearl Harbor, arriving on 14 January. Leaving port on 15 January, she returned to California on 21 January. She then sailed north to Tacoma, Washington, arriving on 25 January, where she was to be mothballed as part of the Pacific Reserve Fleet. Inactivation work began as soon as she arrived, and she was decommissioned on 23 August.

=== Korean War ===
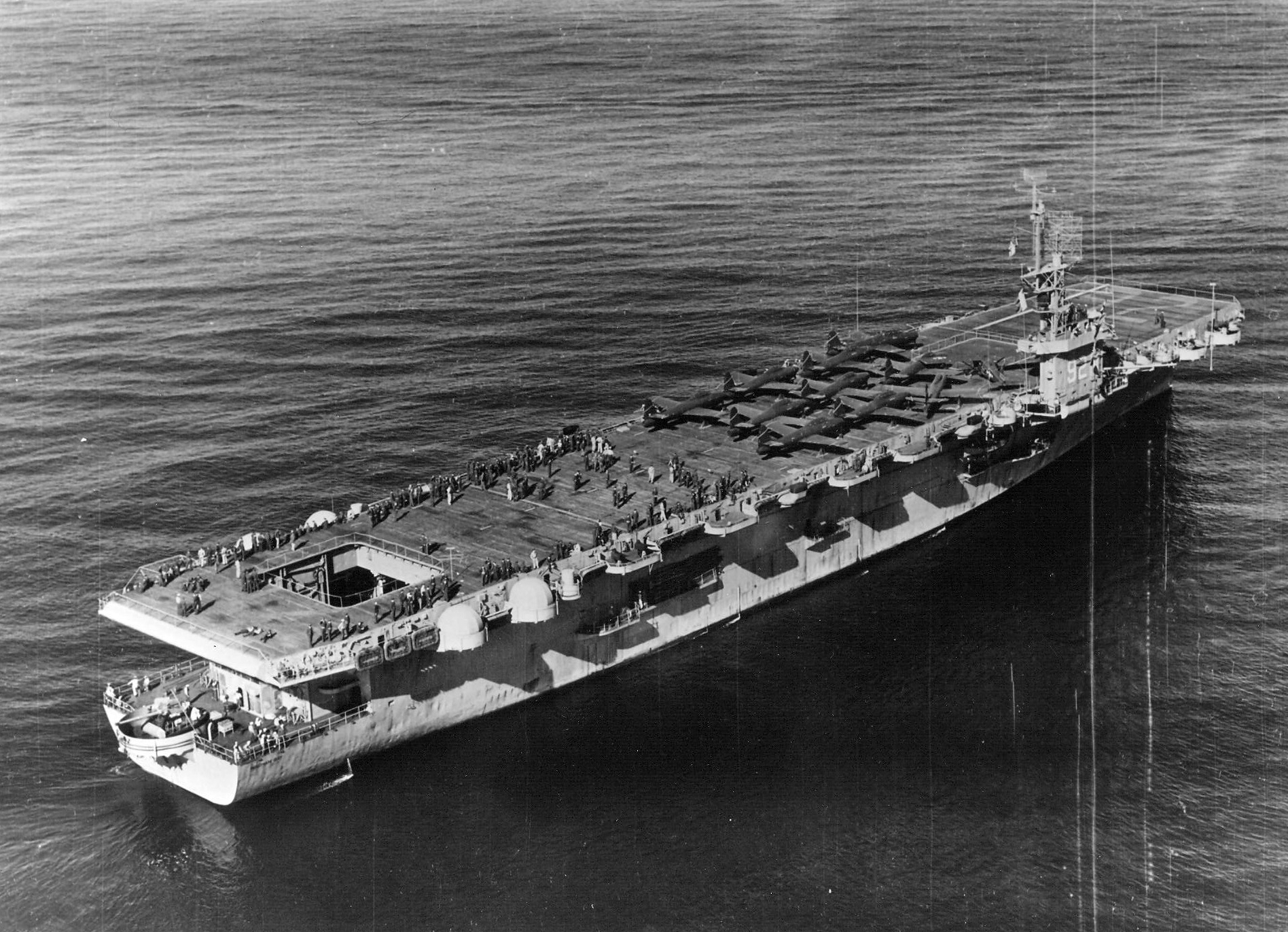
Windham Bay transporting a load of ten Republic F-84 Thunderjets on board her flight deck, along with a single liaison aircraft. Notably, she is shown still carrying her SK-1 radar.

Windham Bay continued to be mothballed with the Pacific Reserve Fleet until the Korean War broke out during the summer of 1950. With the United States intervening in the war, under the auspices of the United Nations, Windham Bay was recommissioned and reclassified as an aircraft transport with the hull symbol T-CVE-92 on 28 October 1950 at Bremerton, Washington, with Captain Charles E. Brunton in command. As an aircraft transport, she was operated by the Military Sea Transportation Service (MSTS) with a civilian crew, but with a military command. On 20 November, she steamed south to California, stopping at San Francisco on her way to San Diego, arriving on 2 December. She then sailed northwards, back to San Francisco, arriving on 13 December. There, she headed to Pearl Harbor, arriving on 19 December. Returning to California, she sailed into Alameda, California on 2 January 1951, before heading back into the Pacific on 7 January, this time with a load of aircraft bound for Korea. She arrived at Yokohama, Japan on 24 January, where she unloaded her cargo. She left Yokohama harbor on 26 January, proceeding southwards, where she visited Saigon in French Indochina. In doing this visit, Windham Bay became the first large vessel to enter the Long Gam River since 1925. Whilst she was docked in Saigon, Vietnamese rebels tossed seventeen hand grenades at the carrier, albeit none exploded. After completing her visit, she headed to Manila, the capital of the Philippines, before heading back to the West Coast. Windham Bay sailed into the San Francisco Bay on 24 February.

For the next twenty months, Windham Bay made nine round-trip transpacific resupply voyages, loading up at either San Francisco or San Diego, always unloading at Yokosuka, and always returning to San Francisco. She broke this routine in October and November 1952, when she visited Kaohsiung, Taiwan, and Bangkok, Thailand, before returning via Japan to Alameda on 9 December. Windham Bay continued her transpacific resupply voyages between the West Coast and Japan throughout 1953. As the Korean War wound down to an armistice, her transport missions began to involve more stops and side trips, notably to Hawaii, the Philippines, and to other Japanese ports besides Yokosuka. French Indochina became a frequent destination, with Windham Bay stopping at the capital of Saigon in May 1954, February 1955, and in March 1955, which by then had become part of the Republic of Vietnam. On 12 June 1955, she was reclassified as a utility carrier, with the hull symbol CVU-92. On 4 August 1956, she was severely damaged by a fire which broke out whilst she was docked in Alameda. In May 1957, she added Naha, Okinawa to her list of ports of call, and in December 1957, she made another stop to Saigon. In all other respects, Windham Bay's career as a transport carrier during this period consisted solely of missions resupplying aircraft from the West Coast to Japan, conducted in support of the fast carriers assigned to cover the western Pacific.

Windham Bay's career as a transport carrier lasted until the end of 1958, during a time in which the navy evaluated the Casablanca-class escort carriers to be less economical and less desirable as transport carriers as compared to the older Bogue-class escort carriers. Therefore, she was yet again decommissioned and mothballed in January 1959, this time as part of the San Francisco Group of the Pacific Reserve Fleet. She was struck from the Navy list on 1 February 1959, and subsequently sold for scrapping to the Hugo Neu Steel Products Corp., of New York City. The ship was ultimately scrapped in Japan throughout February 1961. Windham Bay received three battle stars for her World War II service.

== Sources ==
=== Online sources ===
- "'Windham Bay' (CVE-92)". Dictionary of American Naval Fighting Ships. Naval History and Heritage Command. 27 April 2016. This article incorporates text from this source, which is in the public domain.
- "Kaiser Vancouver, Vancouver WA". www.ShipbuildingHistory.com. 27 November 2010. Archived from the original on 16 June 2019.
- "World Aircraft Carriers List: US Escort Carriers, S4 Hulls". Hazegray.org. 14 December 1998. Archived from the original on 19 November 2021.
- "U.S. Merchant Marine in War". usmm.org. 27 June 2013.
- Maksel, Rebecca (14 August 2012). "How Do You Name an Aircraft Carrier?". Air & Space/Smithsonian.

=== Bibliography ===
- Adcock, Al (1996), Escort Carriers in Action - Warships No. 9, Carrollton, Texas: Squadron/Signal Publications, ISBN 9780897473569
- Arkin, William; Handler, Joshua (1989), Neptune Paper No. 3: Naval Accidents 1945 - 1988 (PDF), Washington, D.C., District of Columbia: Greenpeace / Institute for Policy Studies
- Chesneau, Robert; Gardiner, Robert (1980), Conway's All the World's Fighting Ships 1922–1946, London, England: Naval Institute Press, ISBN 9780870219139
- Friedman, Norman (1983), U.S. Aircraft Carriers: An Illustrated Design History, Annapolis, Maryland: Naval Institute Press, ISBN 9780870217395
- Ross, Al (1993), The Escort Carrier Gambier Bay, Anatomy of the Ship, London, England: Conway Maritime Press, ISBN 9781557502353
- Y'Blood, William (2012), The Little Giants: U.S. Escort Carriers Against Japan, Annapolis, Maryland: Naval Institute Press, ISBN 9781612512471
