= USS Attu =

Casablanca-class escort carrier of the US Navy

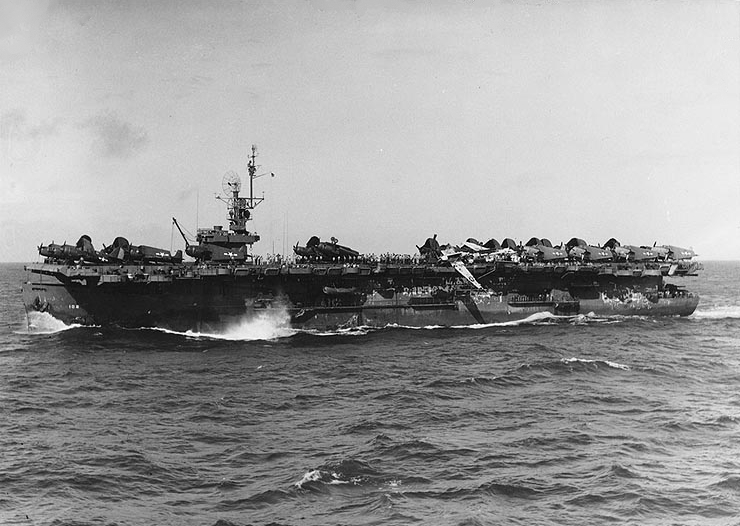
- USS Attu after weathering Typhoon Connie. Several aircraft are in disarray on deck.

History

United States
- Name: Elbour Bay; Attu
- Namesake: Elbow Bay, Long Island; Battle of Attu
- Ordered: as a Type S4-S2-BB3 hull, MCE hull 1139
- Awarded: 18 June 1942
- Builder: Kaiser Shipyards
- Laid down: 16 March 1944
- Launched: 27 May 1944
- Commissioned: 30 June 1944
- Decommissioned: 8 June 1946
- Stricken: 3 July 1946
- Identification: Hull symbol: CVE-102
- Honors and awards: 2 Battle stars
- Fate: Sold for scrap, 3 January 1947 (ultimately scrapped in 1949)

General characteristics
- Class & type: Casablanca-class escort carrier
- Displacement: 8,188 long tons (8,319 t) (standard); 10,902 long tons (11,077 t) (full load)
- Length: 512 ft 3 in (156.13 m) (oa); 490 ft (150 m) (wl); 474 ft (144 m) (fd)
- Beam: 65 ft 2 in (19.86 m); 108 ft (33 m) (extreme width)
- Draft: 20 ft 9 in (6.32 m) (max)
- Installed power: 4 × Babcock & Wilcox boilers; 9,000 shp (6,700 kW)
- Propulsion: 2 × Skinner Unaflow reciprocating steam engines; 2 × screws
- Speed: 19 knots (35 km/h; 22 mph)
- Range: 10,240 nmi (18,960 km; 11,780 mi) at 15 kn (28 km/h; 17 mph)
- Complement: Total: 910–916 officers and men; Embarked Squadron: 50–56; Ship's Crew: 860
- Armament: As designed: 1 × 5 in (127 mm)/38 cal dual-purpose gun; 4 × twin 40 mm (1.57 in) Bofors anti-aircraft guns; 12 × 20 mm (0.79 in) Oerlikon anti-aircraft cannons; Varied, ultimate armament: 1 × 5 in (127 mm)/38 cal dual-purpose gun; 8 × twin 40 mm (1.57 in) Bofors anti-aircraft guns; 20 × 20 mm (0.79 in) Oerlikon anti-aircraft cannons
- Aircraft carried: 27
- Aviation facilities: 1 × catapult; 2 × elevators

Service record
- Part of: United States Pacific Fleet (1944–1946); Atlantic Reserve Fleet (1946–1957)
- Operations: Operation Magic Carpet

USS Attu (CVE-102) was a Casablanca-class escort carrier of the United States Navy. She was named after the Battle of Attu in the Aleutian Islands and was built for service during World War II. Launched in May 1944, and commissioned in June, she served as a transport carrier, ferrying aircraft, and as a replenishment carrier, supporting the Invasion of Iwo Jima and the Battle of Okinawa. Postwar, she participated in Operation Magic Carpet. She was decommissioned in June 1946, and sold for scrapping in January 1947. After a failed acquisition attempt by the Jewish Agency, she was ultimately scrapped in 1949.

== Design and description ==
A side profile of the design of Thetis Bay.

Attu was a Casablanca-class escort carrier, the most numerous type of aircraft carriers ever built. Built to stem heavy losses during the Battle of the Atlantic, they came into service in late 1943, by which time the U-boat threat was already in retreat. Although some did see service in the Atlantic, the majority were utilized in the Pacific, ferrying aircraft, providing logistics support, and conducting close air support for the island-hopping campaigns. The Casablanca-class carriers were built on the standardized Type S4-S2-BB3 hull, a lengthened variant of the Doyen-class hull, and specifically designed to be mass-produced using welded prefabricated sections. This allowed them to be produced at unprecedented speeds: the final ship of her class, Munda, was delivered to the Navy just 101 days after the laying of her keel.

Attu was 512 ft 3 in (156.13 m) long overall (490 ft (150 m) at the waterline), had a beam of 65 ft 2 in (19.86 m), and a draft of 20 ft 9 in (6.32 m). She displaced 8,188 long tons (8,319 t) standard, which increased to 10,902 long tons (11,077 t) with a full load. To carry out flight operations, the ship had a 257 ft (78 m) hangar deck and a 474 ft (144 m) flight deck. Her compact size necessitated the installation of an aircraft catapult at her bow, and there were two aircraft elevators to facilitate movement of aircraft between the flight and hangar deck: one each fore and aft.

She was powered by four Babcock & Wilcox Express D boilers that raised 285 psi (1,970 kPa) of steam at 577 °F (303 °C). The steam generated by these boilers fed two Skinner Unaflow reciprocating steam engines, delivering 9,000 hp (6,700 kW) to two propeller shafts. This allowed her to reach speeds of 19 kn (35 km/h; 22 mph), with a cruising range of 10,240 nmi (18,960 km; 11,780 mi) at 15 kn (28 km/h; 17 mph). For armament, one 5 in (127 mm)/38 caliber dual-purpose gun was mounted on the stern. Additional anti-aircraft defense was provided by eight Bofors 40 mm (1.57 in) anti-aircraft guns in single mounts and twelve Oerlikon 20 mm (0.79 in) cannons mounted around the perimeter of the deck. By 1945, Casablanca-class carriers had been modified to carry twenty Oerlikon cannons and sixteen Bofors guns; the doubling of the latter was accomplished by putting them into twin mounts. Sensors onboard consisted of a SG surface-search radar and a SK air-search radar.

Although Casablanca-class escort carriers were intended to function with a crew of 860 and an embarked squadron of 50 to 56, the exigencies of wartime often necessitated the inflation of the crew count. They were designed to operate with 27 aircraft, but the hangar deck could accommodate much more during transport or training missions.

== Construction ==
Her construction was awarded to Kaiser Shipbuilding Company, Vancouver, Washington under a Maritime Commission contract, on 18 June 1942. She was ordered under the name Elbour Bay (a misspelling of "Elbow Bay"), as part of a tradition which named escort carriers after bays or sounds in Alaska. She was renamed Attu, after the Battle of Attu, on 6 November 1943, as part of a new naval policy which named subsequent Casablanca-class carriers after naval or land engagements. The escort carrier was laid down on 16 March 1944, MC hull 1139, the forty-seventh of a series of fifty Casablanca-class escort carriers. She was launched on 27 May 1944; sponsored by Mrs. George W. Steele; transferred to the United States Navy and commissioned on 30 June 1944, with Captain Henry Fahnestock MacComsey in command.

== Service history ==
=== World War II ===
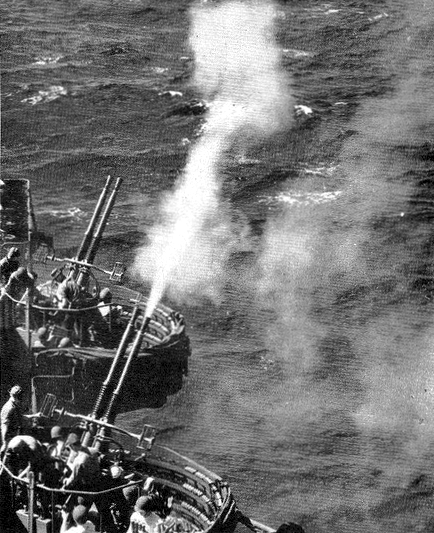
Gunnery drills aboard Attu, circa 1944.

Upon being commissioned, Attu underwent a shakedown cruise down the West Coast to San Diego. On 7 August, she departed San Diego, transporting aircraft and passengers to Pearl Harbor. She then took on another load of aircraft and personnel, and proceeded west, making stops at Guadalcanal and Espiritu Santo. Upon finishing her transport run, she got underway on her return trip on 31 August. She arrived at San Diego on 13 September, where overhaul was conducted. On 28 September, she sailed north to Alameda, California, where she loaded fuel, supplies, and replenishment aircraft.

She departed the West Coast on 1 October, bound for Finschhafen, New Guinea, arriving there on 18 October. She then stopped at Seeadler Harbor in Manus Island, before returning via Pearl Harbor back to Alameda. She departed yet again on 23 November, bound for Pearl Harbor. Upon arriving, she began ferrying supplies and troops between Pearl Harbor and Guam. She finished her duties and returned to San Diego on 4 January 1945. After a short period of rest, she sailed again on 20 January, arriving at Pearl Harbor on 27 January. There, she conducted gunnery exercises in the waters off of Oahu. She concluded her exercises and steamed for Enewetak Atoll on 1 February. Pausing briefly, she proceeded onwards to Ulithi. On 16 February, she departed Ulithi, and was assigned to Task Group 50.8.4 (Logistics Support Group), along with the escort carriers Admiralty Islands, Bougainville, and Windham Bay. This task group was responsible for ferrying and transferring replenishment aircraft to the frontline Fifth Fleet and its carriers, which were supporting the Invasion of Iwo Jima.

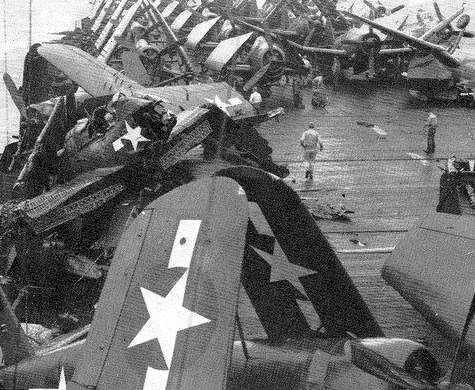
Wrecked aircraft strewn about the flight deck of Attu following Typhoon Connie.

After transferring all of her aircraft, Attu returned to Guam for replacement of her aircraft and supplies. She then sailed westwards again, and served as a replenishment carrier again, this time in support of the landings on Okinawa. This time, her task group was responsible for resupplying both the escort carriers and the fleet carriers operating over the island. On 4 June, were being refueled by tankers, east of Okinawa. Throughout the day, winds began to pick up, and refueling operations had ceased by the time tropical storm force winds were reported in the late afternoon. In fact, Attu's task group was directly in the path of Typhoon Connie, which was proceeding northwards. As Admiral William Halsey Jr., the commander of the Third Fleet, got word of the typhoon, his orders ended up driving a large part of his fleet directly into the path of the incoming storm. Amazingly, Halsey had previously blundered his way into Typhoon Cobra, with much damage and loss of life, in December 1944. As part of the Logistics Support Group, Attu witnessed the worst of the damage, weathering the eyewall of the storm.

As night fell, it became evident that the task group could not avoid encountering the typhoon. The storm's eyewall struck on the early morning of 5 June, and by 3:30, hurricane-force winds had already been reported. At around 4:00, some flags tore off Attu, and wrapped around her radarscope, rendering her blind to the location of the other ships around her. Consequently, she only narrowly avoided, with careful manipulation of the engines, a collision with the tankers. Her crew noted that the bow once came as close as 50 ft (15 m) to a catastrophic collision with a tanker's stern. The typhoon's winds blew several aircraft on board her flight deck off her side, and rendered inoperational or otherwise damaged many more. As she passed through the eye of the storm, the crew managed to unfurl the flags blocking her radar, enabling her to pass through the second half of the storm without much further damage.

On 10 June, Captain Paul Hubert Ramsey took over command of the vessel. In early July, she retired back to San Diego for much belayed repairs of her typhoon damage. On 24 July, with repairs quickly concluded, she steamed westwards. She was sailing through a fueling area in the West Pacific when news of the Japanese surrender broke.

=== Post-war ===
Following the end of the war, she sailed back to California, arriving on 11 November. On 25 November, she joined the "Magic Carpet" fleet, which repatriated U.S. servicemen from throughout the Pacific. She cruised around the Pacific, making stops and returning U.S. servicemen back to the mainland. She completed her "Magic Carpet" duties, and was discharged in early 1946.

By May 1946, Attu was slated for disposal by the Navy. She sailed for Norfolk, Virginia, passing through the Panama Canal and making a stop at Jacksonville, Florida. She was decommissioned on 8 June, and she was struck from the Navy list on 3 July.

After Attu was decommissioned, she was acquired by representatives of the Jewish Agency in New York. The representatives, led by Yehuda Arazi, planned to use the ship to transport up to 10,000 Jews to Palestine, where they wanted to establish a Jewish state. In addition, they planned to utilize the carrier to ferry a large quantity of armaments for the Haganah, the paramilitary precursor of what would become the Israeli Defense Forces in 1948. An initial payment of about $10,000 (equivalent to $134,003 in 2025) was arranged, and a refit was scheduled to prepare the ship. However, the United States Department of State discovered the plan and cancelled the deal; this allowed Attu to be scrapped in 1949. Attu received two battle stars for her World War II service.

== Sources ==
=== Online sources ===
- "Attu (CVE-102)". Dictionary of American Naval Fighting Ships. Naval History and Heritage Command. 27 April 2016. Archived from the original on 5 November 2019.
- "Kaiser Vancouver, Vancouver WA". www.ShipbuildingHistory.com. 27 November 2010. Archived from the original on 16 June 2019.
- "World Aircraft Carriers List: US Escort Carriers, S4 Hulls". Hazegray.org. 14 December 1998. Archived from the original on 19 November 2021.
- Maksel, Rebecca (14 August 2012). "How Do You Name an Aircraft Carrier?". Air & Space/Smithsonian.
- Stubblebine, Daniel (June 2011). "Escort Carrier Makin Island (CVE-93)". ww2db.com.

=== Bibliography ===
- Adcock, Al (1996), Escort Carriers in Action - Warships No. 9, Carrollton, Texas: Squadron/Signal Publications, ISBN 9780897473569
- Chesneau, Robert; Gardiner, Robert (1980), Conway's All the World's Fighting Ships 1922–1946, London, England: Naval Institute Press, ISBN 9780870219139
- Friedman, Norman (1983), U.S. Aircraft Carriers: An Illustrated Design History, Annapolis, Maryland: Naval Institute Press, ISBN 9780870217395
- Ross, Al (1993), The Escort Carrier Gambier Bay, Anatomy of the Ship, London, England: Conway Maritime Press, ISBN 9781557502353
- Slater, Leonard (1970), The Pledge, New York City, United States: Simon & Schuster, ISBN 9780671204655
- Lask, Thomas (15 May 1970). "Books of The Times". The New York Times.
- Y'Blood, William (2012), The Little Giants: U.S. Escort Carriers Against Japan, Annapolis, Maryland: Naval Institute Press, ISBN 9781612512471
