= Eric Curry (photographer) =

American photographer

Eric Curry (born 1956) is an American photographer based in Los Angeles specializing in stock and industrial photography. A graduate of the Art Center College of Design, Curry's photographs have appeared on the cover of Air & Space magazine and have been showcased in the University of California Riverside's California Museum of Photography and the Ordover Gallery at the San Diego Natural History Museum. He was featured on Canon Camera's Canon Digital Learning Center in connection with his "painting with light" technique.
