= USS Bougainville (CVE-100) =

Casablanca-class escort carrier of the US Navy

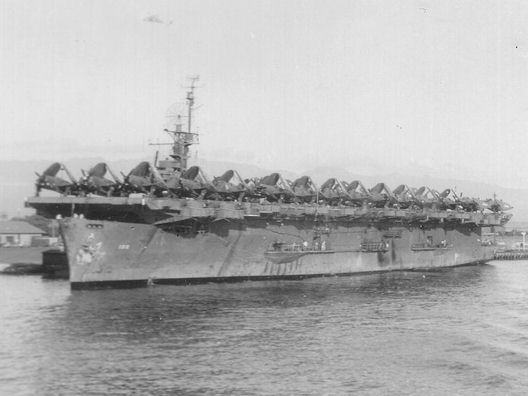
- USS Bougainville at Pearl Harbor, circa 1945

History

United States
- Name: Didrickson Bay; Bougainville
- Namesake: Didrickson Bay, Chichagof Island; Bougainville campaign
- Ordered: as a Type S4-S2-BB3 hull, MCE hull 1137
- Awarded: 18 June 1942
- Builder: Kaiser Shipyards
- Laid down: 3 March 1944
- Launched: 16 May 1944
- Commissioned: 18 June 1944
- Decommissioned: 30 November 1946
- Stricken: 1 May 1960
- Identification: Hull symbol: CVE-100
- Honors and awards: 2 Battle stars
- Fate: Sold for scrap, 29 August 1960

General characteristics
- Class & type: Casablanca-class escort carrier
- Displacement: 8,188 long tons (8,319 t) (standard); 10,902 long tons (11,077 t) (full load)
- Length: 512 ft 3 in (156.13 m) (oa); 490 ft (150 m) (wl); 474 ft (144 m) (fd)
- Beam: 65 ft 2 in (19.86 m); 108 ft (33 m) (extreme width)
- Draft: 20 ft 9 in (6.32 m) (max)
- Installed power: 4 × Babcock & Wilcox boilers; 9,000 shp (6,700 kW)
- Propulsion: 2 × Skinner Unaflow reciprocating steam engines; 2 × screws
- Speed: 19 knots (35 km/h; 22 mph)
- Range: 10,240 nmi (18,960 km; 11,780 mi) at 15 kn (28 km/h; 17 mph)
- Complement: Total: 910 – 916 officers and men; Embarked Squadron: 50 – 56; Ship's Crew: 860
- Armament: As designed: 1 × 5 in (127 mm)/38 cal dual-purpose gun; 4 × twin 40 mm (1.57 in) Bofors anti-aircraft guns; 12 × 20 mm (0.79 in) Oerlikon anti-aircraft cannons; Varied, ultimate armament: 1 × 5 in (127 mm)/38 cal dual-purpose gun; 8 × twin 40 mm (1.57 in) Bofors anti-aircraft guns; 20 × 20 mm (0.79 in) Oerlikon anti-aircraft cannons
- Aircraft carried: 27
- Aviation facilities: 1 × catapult; 2 × elevators

Service record
- Part of: United States Pacific Fleet (1944–1946); Pacific Reserve Fleet (1946–1960)

USS Bougainville (CVE-100) was the forty-sixth of fifty Casablanca-class escort carrier built for the United States Navy during World War II. She was named after the Bougainville campaign, a prolonged action against Japanese forces entrenched in the island of Bougainville off Papua New Guinea . The ship was launched in May 1944, and commissioned in June, and served as a replenishment carrier in support of the invasion of Iwo Jima and the Battle of Okinawa. She was decommissioned in November 1946, when she was mothballed in the Pacific Reserve Fleet. Ultimately, she was sold for scrapping in August 1960.

== Design and description ==
A side profile of the design of Thetis Bay.

Corregidor was a Casablanca-class escort carrier, the most numerous type of aircraft carriers ever built. Built to stem heavy losses during the Battle of the Atlantic, they came into service in late 1943, by which time the U-boat threat was already in retreat. Although some did see service in the Atlantic, the majority were utilized in the Pacific, ferrying aircraft, providing logistics support, and conducting close air support for the island-hopping campaigns. The Casablanca-class carriers were built on the standardized Type S4-S2-BB3 hull, a lengthened variant of the Doyen-class hull, and specifically designed to be mass-produced using welded prefabricated sections. This allowed them to be produced at unprecedented speeds: the final ship of her class, Munda, was delivered to the Navy just 101 days after the laying of her keel.

Corregidor was 512 ft 3 in (156.13 m) long overall (490 ft (150 m) at the waterline), had a beam of 65 ft 2 in (19.86 m), and a draft of 20 ft 9 in (6.32 m). She displaced 8,188 long tons (8,319 t) standard, which increased to 10,902 long tons (11,077 t) with a full load. To carry out flight operations, the ship had a 257 ft (78 m) hangar deck and a 474 ft (144 m) flight deck. Her compact size necessitated the installation of an aircraft catapult at her bow, and there were two aircraft elevators to facilitate movement of aircraft between the flight and hangar deck: one each fore and aft.

She was powered by four Babcock & Wilcox Express D boilers that raised 285 psi (1,970 kPa) of steam at 577 °F (303 °C). The steam generated by these boilers fed two Skinner Unaflow reciprocating steam engines, delivering 9,000 hp (6,700 kW) to two propeller shafts. This allowed her to reach speeds of 19 kn (35 km/h; 22 mph), with a cruising range of 10,240 nmi (18,960 km; 11,780 mi) at 15 kn (28 km/h; 17 mph). For armament, one 5 in (127 mm)/38 caliber dual-purpose gun was mounted on the stern. Additional anti-aircraft defense was provided by eight Bofors 40 mm (1.57 in) anti-aircraft guns in single mounts and twelve Oerlikon 20 mm (0.79 in) cannons mounted around the perimeter of the deck. By 1945, Casablanca-class carriers had been modified to carry twenty Oerlikon cannons and sixteen Bofors guns; the doubling of the latter was accomplished by putting them into twin mounts. Sensors onboard consisted of a SG surface-search radar and a SK air-search radar.

Although Casablanca-class escort carriers were intended to function with a crew of 860 and an embarked squadron of 50 to 56, the exigencies of wartime often necessitated the inflation of the crew count. They were designed to operate with 27 aircraft, but the hangar deck could accommodate much more during transport or training missions. Because Bougainville only operated in a replenishment capability, she usually operated with about 60 aircraft on board, the maximum carrying capacity at which take-offs would still be possible.

== Construction ==
Her construction was awarded to Kaiser Shipbuilding Company, Vancouver, Washington under a Maritime Commission contract, on 18 June 1942, under the name Didrickson Bay, as part of a tradition which named escort carriers after bays or sounds in Alaska. She was renamed Bougainville, as part of a new naval policy which named subsequent Casablanca-class carriers after naval or land engagements. The escort carrier was laid down on 3 March 1944, MC hull 1137, the forty-sixth of a series of fifty Casablanca-class escort carriers. She was launched on 16 May 1944; sponsored by Mrs. Sally A. Monfort; transferred to the United States Navy and commissioned on 18 June 1944, with Captain Charles Alonzo Bond in command.

== Service history ==
=== World War II ===
Upon being commissioned, Bougainville got underway, on 7 July, on a shakedown cruise down the West Coast to San Diego. Upon arriving, she was assigned to the Carrier Transport Squadron of the Pacific Fleet. The carrier departed on 25 July with a load of aircraft, bound for the West Pacific. Transiting via Pearl Harbor, she headed to Majuro, in the Marshall Islands. She returned to the West Coast on 23 August, and following a seventeen-day period at port, she left on 9 September for another transport mission. She steamed to Finschhafen, New Guinea, before proceeding to Manus Island in the Admiralty Islands, where she unloaded her aircraft. There, she took on an air group returning to Pearl Harbor, arriving at Oahu in mid-October.

After unloading her cargo, she took on a complement of sixty-four fighter aircraft, all bound for the Mariana Islands. After arriving at Saipan, her crew went to general quarters for the first time on 3 November in response to Japanese aircraft. Departing on 4 November, she headed to Guam, before returning to Pearl Harbor. In the closing months of 1944, Bougainville made another transport mission from Pearl Harbor to the Marianas, making a stop at Eniwetok. Upon completing her mission, she departed in mid-December for the West Coast, arriving at San Diego on 22 December. There, she underwent another stay of availability, until 7 January 1945, when she headed back into the Pacific.

She stopped at Pearl Harbor on 13 January, where she commenced flight training and gunnery exercises. Upon the completion of these activities, she departed Hawaiian waters on 30 January, arriving back at Eniwetok a week later. There, on 8 February, she was assigned to become a replenishment carrier as a part of Task Group 50.8.4, the mobile replenishment group supporting the frontline Fifth Fleet. She served alongside three other escort carriers, Admiralty Islands, Attu, and Windham Bay. Replenishment escort carriers such as Bougainville enabled the frontline carriers to replace battle losses, and to stay at sea for longer durations of time. She departed Eniwetok to commence her replenishment duties on 9 February.

For the next four months, Bougainville operated in a replenishment capability, supplying the Third Fleet's Fast Carrier Task Force with supplies, replacement aircraft, and munitions. She first supported Vice Admiral Marc Mitscher's carriers as they conducted operations in support of the landings on Iwo Jima. Upon the conclusion of said campaign, she provided aircraft to replace losses sustained in raids against the Japanese mainland, and she also provided support throughout the first six weeks of the Battle of Okinawa. During the Okinawa campaign, she had the task of providing replacement aircraft for both the escort carriers and the fleet carriers. Throughout her service as a replenishment carrier, she received supplies and additional aircraft from bases located within Eniwetok, Guam, and Ulithi in the Caroline Islands.

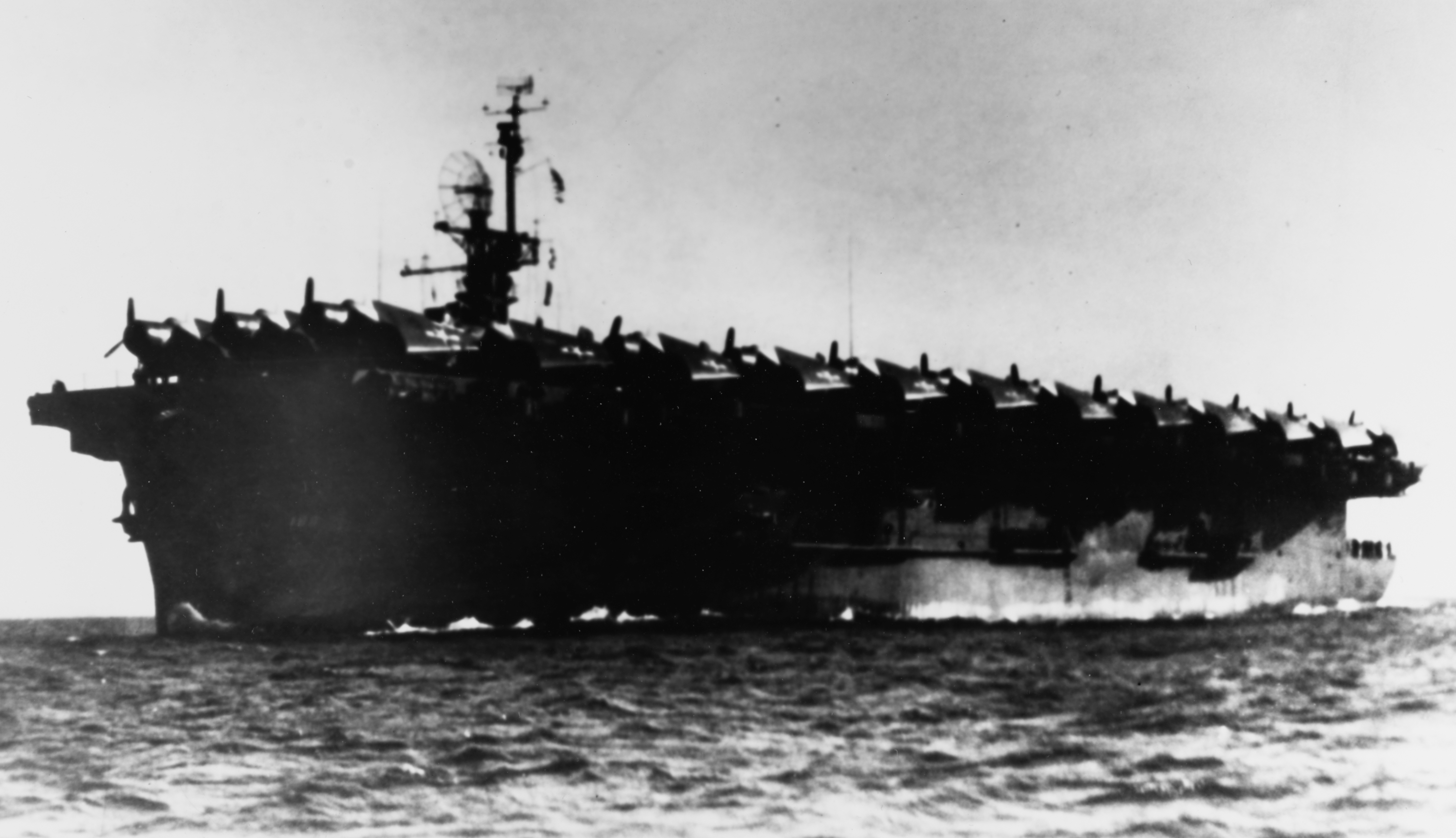
Bougainville at sea, circa 1945.

On 5 June, Bougainville, along with the ships of Task Group 38.1 and Task Group 30.8, was trapped in the path of Typhoon Connie, which was proceeding northwards, and on a course to the east of Okinawa. Admiral William Halsey Jr., which had already led the Third Fleet into the deadly Typhoon Cobra in December 1944, now managed to lead the Third Fleet yet again into another deadly storm. At the peak of the storm, Windham Bay experienced estimated winds of 127 kn (235 km/h; 146 mph) and waves towering some 75 ft (23 m) high. As Task Group 50.8 emerged from the typhoon, Bougainville had suffered considerable damage, in both her hull, and her aircraft contingent. Twenty-seven planes on Bougainville had been lost or wrecked, and most of her remaining planes, located in her hangar deck, were inaccessible, because both of her aircraft elevators had been jammed. In addition, her flight deck supports had been damaged, and she suffered much additional superficial damage.

In mid-June, Bougainville was released from her replenishment duties, when she undertook a transport mission to bases located within the Philippines, before returning to Guam. After completing her mission, she steamed eastward, pausing at Pearl Harbor, before arriving back at San Diego, where she lay in port until early August for repairs and replenishment. On 9 August, she left San Diego, bound yet again for the West Pacific. En route, her crew received news of the Japanese surrender on 15 August. After stops at Pearl Harbor and Guam, she was anchored off of the island of Roi-Namur when the formal signing of the Japanese Instrument of Surrender was occurring on 2 September. There, she loaded inoperational aircraft, before heading back to Oahu. At Pearl Harbor, she took on a load of aircraft and passengers, departing port on 12 September, stopping at Apra Harbor, Guam, where she disembarked some passengers and took on additional aircraft. Continuing westwards, she anchored at Nakagusuku Bay on 27 September, before leaving harbor the following day to evade Typhoon Jean, which appeared to heading for the Okinawa Islands.

Bougainville returned to port on 3 October, where she took on two Marine Corps observation squadrons, VMO-3 and VMO-6, which were headed to China for occupation duty. On 10 October, she arrived at the Taku Forts, where she disembarked VMO-3, which was attached to the 3rd Marines. Proceeding southwards, she arrived at Qingdao on 11 October, and on 12 October, VMO-6, which was attached to the 6th Marines, disembarked. After a layover of four days at Qingdao, she steamed for Okinawa on 16 October. She entered Nakagusuku Bay on 19 October, where she took on a load of inoperational aircraft and passengers. Steaming eastwards, she made a brief layover at Pearl Harbor, arriving back at the West Coast by the end of October.

After a long stay in port, Bougainville once again departed on 28 November, heading to Eniwetok, via Pearl Harbor. She returned to San Diego on 12 January 1946, whereupon she steamed northwards, arriving at Tacoma, Washington in late-January. There, inactivation work was conducted, and she was placed in reserve on 29 July. She was decommissioned on 30 November, and mothballed in the Pacific Reserve Fleet, as part of its Tacoma Group. Whilst in reserve, she was reclassified as a utility aircraft carrier (CVU-100) on 12 June 1955. She was further reclassified as an aircraft ferry (AKV-35) on 7 May 1959. She was struck from the Navy list on 1 April 1960, and she was sold on 9 September to the Cole Export Corp. Delivered on 7 November, she was ultimately broken up in Japan later that year. Bougainville received two battle stars for her World War II service.

== Sources ==
=== Online sources ===
- "Bougainville I (CVE-100)". Dictionary of American Naval Fighting Ships. Naval History and Heritage Command. 1 May 2017. Archived from the original on 31 December 2019. This article incorporates text from this source, which is in the public domain.
- "Pacific Typhoon: June 1945 – Extract from Third Fleet Report, 14 July 1945". Dictionary of American Naval Fighting Ships. Naval History and Heritage Command. 2 April 2015. Archived from the original on 31 May 2019. This article incorporates text from this source, which is in the public domain.
- "Kaiser Vancouver, Vancouver WA". www.ShipbuildingHistory.com. 27 November 2010. Archived from the original on 16 June 2019.
- "World Aircraft Carriers List: US Escort Carriers, S4 Hulls". Hazegray.org. 14 December 1998. Archived from the original on 19 November 2021.
- Maksel, Rebecca (14 August 2012). "How Do You Name an Aircraft Carrier?". Air & Space/Smithsonian.
- Stubblebine, Daniel (June 2011). "Escort Carrier Makin Island (CVE-93)". ww2db.com.

=== Bibliography ===
- Adcock, Al (1996), Escort Carriers in Action - Warships No. 9, Carrollton, Texas: Squadron/Signal Publications, ISBN 9780897473569
- Chesneau, Robert; Gardiner, Robert (1980), Conway's All the World's Fighting Ships 1922–1946, London, England: Naval Institute Press, ISBN 9780870219139
- Friedman, Norman (1983), U.S. Aircraft Carriers: An Illustrated Design History, Annapolis, Maryland: Naval Institute Press, ISBN 9780870217395
- Ross, Al (1993), The Escort Carrier Gambier Bay, Anatomy of the Ship, London, England: Conway Maritime Press, ISBN 9781557502353
- Y'Blood, William (2012), The Little Giants: U.S. Escort Carriers Against Japan, Annapolis, Maryland: Naval Institute Press, ISBN 9781612512471
