= USS Admiralty Islands =

Casablanca-class escort carrier of the US Navy

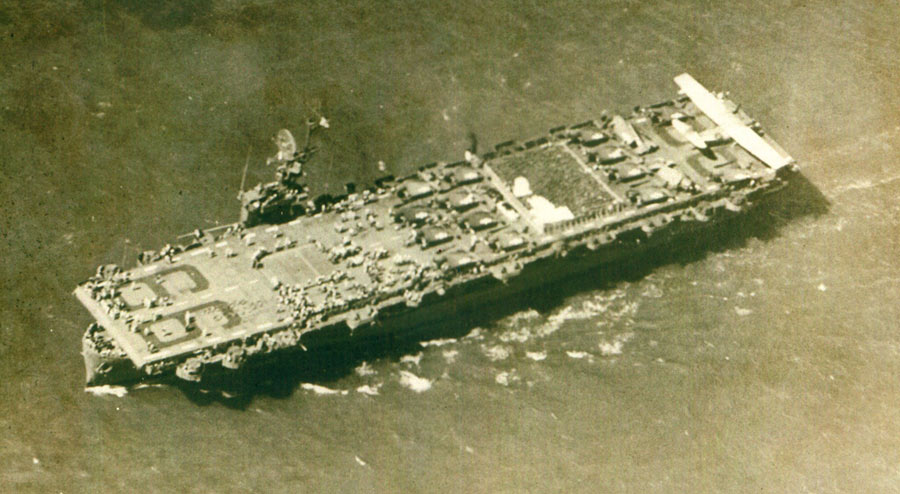
- USS Admiralty Islands, with a Catalina PBY flying boat on her stern, circa 1945

History

United States
- Name: Chaplin Bay; Admiralty Islands
- Namesake: Chaplin Bay, Admiralty Island; Admiralty Islands campaign
- Ordered: as a Type S4-S2-BB3 hull, MCE hull 1136
- Awarded: 18 June 1942
- Builder: Kaiser Shipyards
- Laid down: 26 February 1944
- Launched: 10 May 1944
- Commissioned: 13 June 1944
- Decommissioned: 24 April 1946
- Stricken: 8 May 1946
- Identification: Hull symbol: CVE-99
- Honors and awards: 3 Battle stars
- Fate: Sold for scrap, 2 January 1947

General characteristics
- Class & type: Casablanca-class escort carrier
- Displacement: 8,188 long tons (8,319 t) (standard); 10,902 long tons (11,077 t) (full load)
- Length: 512 ft 3 in (156.13 m) (oa); 490 ft (150 m) (wl); 474 ft (144 m) (fd)
- Beam: 65 ft 2 in (19.86 m); 108 ft (33 m) (extreme width)
- Draft: 20 ft 9 in (6.32 m) (max)
- Installed power: 4 × Babcock & Wilcox boilers; 9,000 shp (6,700 kW)
- Propulsion: 2 × Skinner Unaflow reciprocating steam engines; 2 × screws
- Speed: 19 knots (35 km/h; 22 mph)
- Range: 10,240 nmi (18,960 km; 11,780 mi) at 15 kn (28 km/h; 17 mph)
- Complement: Total: 910 – 916 officers and men; Embarked Squadron: 50 – 56; Ship's Crew: 860
- Armament: As designed: 1 × 5 in (127 mm)/38 cal dual-purpose gun; 4 × twin 40 mm (1.57 in) Bofors anti-aircraft guns; 12 × 20 mm (0.79 in) Oerlikon anti-aircraft cannons; Varied, ultimate armament: 1 × 5 in (127 mm)/38 cal dual-purpose gun; 8 × twin 40 mm (1.57 in) Bofors anti-aircraft guns; 20 × 20 mm (0.79 in) Oerlikon anti-aircraft cannons
- Aircraft carried: 27
- Aviation facilities: 1 × catapult; 2 × elevators

Service record
- Part of: United States Pacific Fleet (1944–1946)
- Commanders: Captain Edward Hastings Eldredge
- Operations: Invasion of Iwo Jima; Battle of Okinawa; Operation Magic Carpet

USS Admiralty Islands (CVE-99) was the forty-fifth of fifty Casablanca-class escort carrier built for the United States Navy during World War II. She was named after the Admiralty Islands campaign, a series of battles against isolated Japanese forces throughout the Admiralty Islands in the Bismarck Archipelago. The ship was launched in May 1944, commissioned in June, and served as a replenishment carrier, under the command of Capt. Edward Hastings Eldredge, in support of the invasion of Iwo Jima and the Battle of Okinawa. Postwar, she participated in Operation Magic Carpet. She was decommissioned in November 1946, when she was mothballed in the Pacific Reserve Fleet. Ultimately, she was sold for scrapping in January 1947.

== Design and description ==
A side profile of the design of Thetis Bay.

Admiralty Islands was a Casablanca-class escort carrier, the most numerous type of aircraft carriers ever built. Built to stem heavy losses during the Battle of the Atlantic, they came into service in late 1943, by which time the U-boat threat was already in retreat. Although some did see service in the Atlantic, the majority were utilized in the Pacific, ferrying aircraft, providing logistics support, and conducting close air support for the island-hopping campaigns. The Casablanca-class carriers were built on the standardized Type S4-S2-BB3 hull, a lengthened variant of the Doyen-class hull, and specifically designed to be mass-produced using welded prefabricated sections. This allowed them to be produced at unprecedented speeds: the final ship of her class, Munda, was delivered to the Navy just 101 days after the laying of her keel.

Admiralty Islands was 512 ft 3 in (156.13 m) long overall (490 ft (150 m) at the waterline), had a beam of 65 ft 2 in (19.86 m), and a draft of 20 ft 9 in (6.32 m). She displaced 8,188 long tons (8,319 t) standard, which increased to 10,902 long tons (11,077 t) with a full load. To carry out flight operations, the ship had a 257 ft (78 m) hangar deck and a 474 ft (144 m) flight deck. Her compact size necessitated the installation of an aircraft catapult at her bow, and there were two aircraft elevators to facilitate movement of aircraft between the flight and hangar deck: one each fore and aft.

She was powered by four Babcock & Wilcox Express D boilers that raised 285 psi (1,970 kPa) of steam at 577 °F (303 °C). The steam generated by these boilers fed two Skinner Unaflow reciprocating steam engines, delivering 9,000 hp (6,700 kW) to two propeller shafts. This allowed her to reach speeds of 19 kn (35 km/h; 22 mph), with a cruising range of 10,240 nmi (18,960 km; 11,780 mi) at 15 kn (28 km/h; 17 mph). For armament, one 5 in (127 mm)/38 caliber dual-purpose gun was mounted on the stern. Additional anti-aircraft defense was provided by eight Bofors 40 mm (1.57 in) anti-aircraft guns in single mounts and twelve Oerlikon 20 mm (0.79 in) cannons mounted around the perimeter of the deck. By 1945, Casablanca-class carriers had been modified to carry twenty Oerlikon cannons and sixteen Bofors guns; the doubling of the latter was accomplished by putting them into twin mounts. Sensors onboard consisted of a SG surface-search radar and a SK air-search radar.

Although Casablanca-class escort carriers were intended to function with a crew of 860 and an embarked squadron of 50 to 56, the exigencies of wartime often necessitated the inflation of the crew count. They were designed to operate with 27 aircraft, but the hangar deck could accommodate much more during transport or training missions. Because Admiralty Islands only operated in a replenishment capability, she usually operated with about 60 aircraft on board, the maximum carrying capacity at which take-offs would still be possible.

== Construction ==
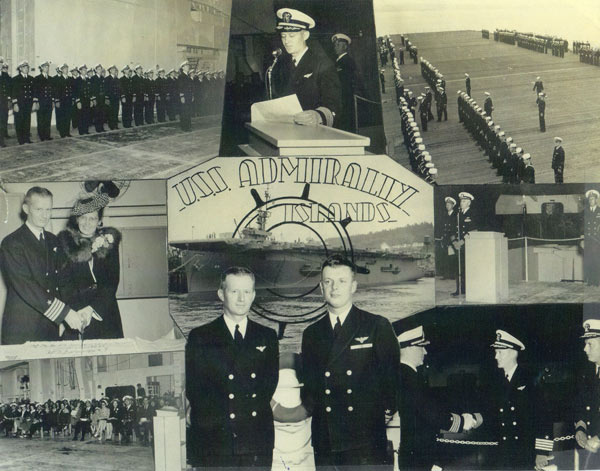
A collage of photos taken during the commissioning ceremony of Admiralty Islands.

Her construction was awarded to Kaiser Shipbuilding Company, Vancouver, Washington under a Maritime Commission contract, on 18 June 1942, under the name Chaplin Bay, as part of a tradition which named escort carriers after bays or sounds in Alaska. She was renamed Admiralty Islands on 26 April 1944, as part of a new naval policy which named subsequent Casablanca-class carriers after naval or land engagements. As the ninety-ninth escort carrier, and the forty-fifth of the Casablanca class carriers, she received the hull symbol CVE-99. The escort carrier was laid down on 26 February 1944, MC hull 1136, the forty-fourth of a series of fifty Casablanca-class escort carriers. She was launched on 10 May 1944; sponsored by the wife of Vice Admiral Homer N. Wallin; transferred to the United States Navy and commissioned on 13 June 1944.

== Service history ==
Upon being commissioned, Admiralty Islands got underway, on 2 July 1944, from Astoria, Oregon on a shakedown cruise down the West Coast to San Francisco. Upon arriving, she took on fuel oil and aviation gas. Proceeding southwards, she arrived at San Diego on 14 July, for additional training. There, she was assigned to join the Carrier Transport Squadron of the Pacific Fleet, ferrying aircraft, personnel, and supplies to the frontline in the West Pacific. She took on a load of cargo at San Diego, and departed westwards.

Transiting via Pearl Harbor, Admiralty Islands headed to Majuro, in the Marshall Islands, arriving there on 9 August, where she disembarked her cargo. She returned to Pearl Harbor, where she transported aircraft and personnel back to the West Coast, arriving at San Francisco on 24 August. She then made another round-trip transport run in September, this time to Finschhafen, New Guinea. She returned to San Diego on 7 October, where she underwent refit from 8 October to 26 October. On 29 October, she left port, headed northwards towards Alameda, where she loaded aircraft and passengers from Naval Air Station Alameda. She then commenced another trip to Finschhafen, arriving on 21 November. Upon disembarking her load, she proceed to Manus Island in the Admiralty Islands, docking in Seeadler Harbor on 23 November. On her way back, she stopped at Pearl Harbor from 6 to 7 December, before reaching San Diego a week later. There, she loaded more aircraft and military passengers, and sailed westwards, touching Pearl Harbor on 24 December. On 26 December, the day after Christmas, she left port, bound for Guam.

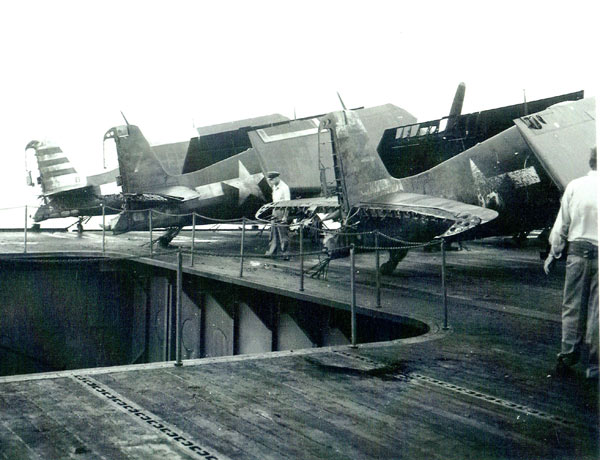
Crew from Admiralty Islands inspect the fire damage inflicted on some aircraft on the morning of 19 July 1944.

Upon reaching Guam on 6 January 1945, Admiralty Islands conducted training operations for two days, before sailing for Hawaii on 10 January. She reached Pearl Harbor on 20 January, where repairs were made to her main engine, finishing on 31 January. Upon the completion of repairs, she was assigned to become a replenishment carrier as a part of Task Group 50.8.4, the mobile replenishment group supporting the frontline Fifth Fleet. Replenishment carriers enabled larger fleet carriers to operate out at sea for extended periods of time without having to withdraw to port. She served alongside three other escort carriers, Bougainville, Attu, and Windham Bay. She took on a complement of sixty-one replacement planes at Pearl Harbor, and she left port on 2 February, bound for the waters off of Iwo Jima, in support of the planned landings there. After stopping at Eniwetok and Ulithi, she began replenishment operations on 16 February, continuing throughout the next five months.

On 2 March, the carrier returned to Guam for provisioning and minor repairs. On 13 March, she sortied, this time in support of the prolonged Battle of Okinawa. This time, her task group had the task of resupplying both the escort carriers and the fleet carriers of the Fast Carrier Task Force. Throughout this period, she received provisions and aircraft from Guam, making trips to and from the island. On 18 April, Admiralty Islands suffered an operational casualty from a Grumman F6F Hellcat fighter crashing into her flight deck. At 12:17, she sounded flight quarters, and she commenced launching replacement aircraft at 13:52, delivering one Grumman F6F Hellcat, two Grumman TBM Avengers, and two Curtiss SB2C Helldivers to the fleet carrier Essex. At 14:06, she began recovering ten combat-fatigued aircraft (commonly known as "Flyable Duds") from Essex.

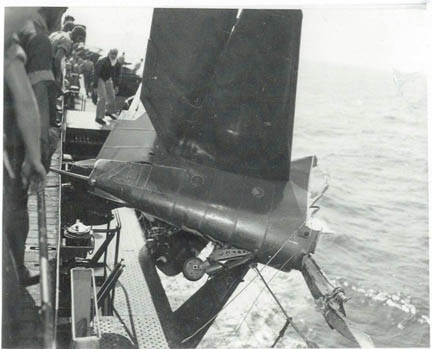
The latter half of Ensign Roy Edward Jones' Hellcat dangles off of the side of Admiralty Islands, following a fatal accident on 18 April 1945.

The first aircraft which attempted to land was a Hellcat, piloted by Ensign Roy Edward Jones. As it approached Admiralty Islands, the pilot received a signal to abort its landing, after it responded poorly to "low" and "opposite slant" flag signals. With the "wave off" signal from the Landing Signal Officer (LSO) being sent late, the aircraft continued to lose altitude. As the pilot applied full throttle, its tail hook caught the No 5. arresting wire, forcing the aircraft onto a gun mount, splitting the fighter in half. The cockpit and engine were ejected into the ocean, whilst the latter half dangled off the wire. The carrier's crew was unable to retrieve the front half of the fighter, nor the body of the pilot. The LSO was forced to jump into the safety net, breaking his leg.

Admiralty Islands returned to Guam on 24 April for repairs to her boilers, two of which had become dysfunctional. Whilst she was moored for repairs, the other three escort carriers of her task group endured Typhoon Connie, which transited northwards through the waters east of Okinawa. Upon the completion of repairs, she departed on 14 May to continue replenishment duties. She continued these duties throughout May, before being detached and transiting, via Guam, to Saipan on 15 June. She remained in port for two weeks, before being assigned to Task Group 30.8, the Fleet Oiler and Transport Group which was supporting the Third Fleet, which was conducting airstrikes against the Japanese mainland. She suffered another casualty on 20 July, when aircraft from one of the fleet carriers conducting strikes was diverted to Admiralty Islands because its home carrier had experienced a crash landing, with a resulting fire. All of the aircraft landed safely, except for one, which was unable to eject its spare belly-mounted gasoline tanks. As the plane circled the carrier, refusing the order to ditch and struggling to jettison its belly tank, the rest of the aircraft had already been stowed beyond the forward wire barriers.

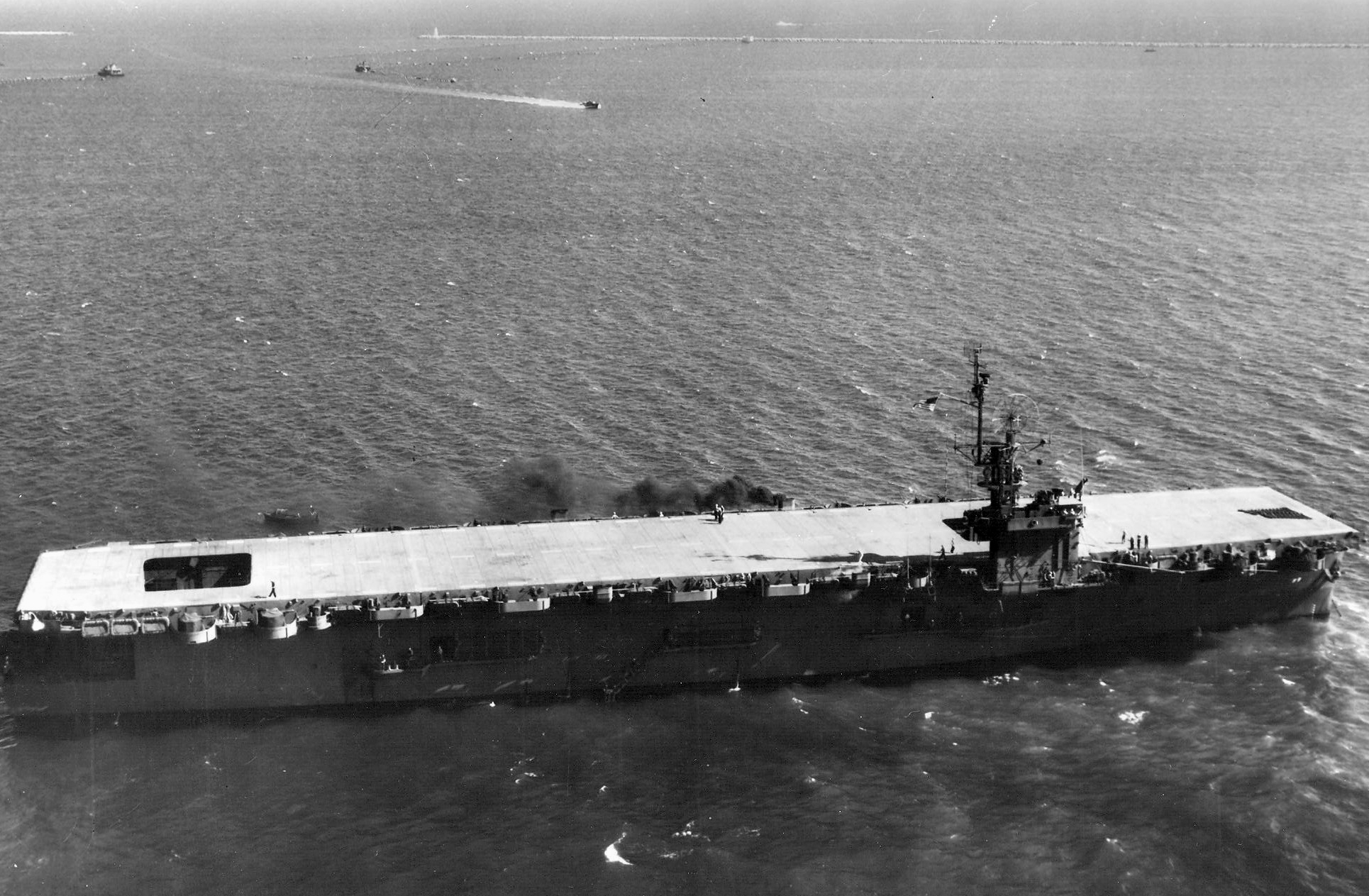
Admiralty Islands anchored off the California coast, 30 August 1945.

With the aircraft stored away, the plane was given the greenlight to attempt a landing, some forty-five minutes before sunset. As the plane caught the first arresting gear, the gasoline tank detached, skidded down the flight deck, hit a crewman, and exploded, killing the man. The explosion sprayed burning gasoline onto the parked planes, and set alight the wooden flight deck. An aircraft mechanic, Glenn Barton, said about the crash, "When the tank hit the deck, there was a tidal wave of flame that went across, and I raced the burning gas across the deck". The fire forced the evacuation of the bridge, and the engines were cut to deny the fire wind. It appears that the pilot of the landing plane escaped without injury. As a result of the damage sustained from this accident, Admiralty Island was ordered to detach from the task group and to retire to the West Coast. On 21 July, she was detached from Task Group 30.8, and she steamed for Guam, where she unloaded her cargo, and refueled.

After refueling, Admiralty Islands proceeded to the West Coast, arriving at San Diego on 11 August, before heading northwards to San Pedro for refit. Most of the planned alterations were cancelled, as a result of the Japanese surrender being announced on 15 August. Nonetheless, repairs were conducted, and on 1 September, she was assigned to join the "Magic Carpet" fleet, which repatriated servicemen from throughout the Pacific.

She conducted "Magic Carpet" runs until 24 April 1946, when she was decommissioned. She was struck from the Navy list on 8 May, and the hull was sold on 2 January 1947 to the Zidell Machinery and Supply Company of Portland, Oregon. She was ultimately broken up just miles from where she was constructed. Admiralty Islands received three battle stars for her World War II service.

== Sources ==
=== Online sources ===
- "Admiralty Islands (CVE-99)". Dictionary of American Naval Fighting Ships. Naval History and Heritage Command. 9 July 2015. Archived from the original on 2 February 2016. This article incorporates text from this source, which is in the public domain.
- "USS Admiralty Islands (CVE-99)". NavSource. 2 September 2019.
- "Kaiser Vancouver, Vancouver WA". Shipbuilding History. 27 November 2010. Archived from the original on 16 June 2019.
- "World Aircraft Carriers List: US Escort Carriers, S4 Hulls". Hazegray.org. 14 December 1998. Archived from the original on 19 November 2021.
- Maksel, Rebecca (14 August 2012). "How Do You Name an Aircraft Carrier?". Air & Space/Smithsonian.
- Stubblebine, Daniel (June 2011). "Escort Carrier Makin Island (CVE-93)". ww2db.com.

=== Bibliography ===
- Adcock, Al (1996), Escort Carriers in Action - Warships No. 9, Carrollton, Texas: Squadron/Signal Publications, ISBN 9780897473569
- Chesneau, Robert; Gardiner, Robert (1980), Conway's All the World's Fighting Ships 1922–1946, London, England: Naval Institute Press, ISBN 9780870219139
- Friedman, Norman (1983), U.S. Aircraft Carriers: An Illustrated Design History, Annapolis, Maryland: Naval Institute Press, ISBN 9780870217395
- Ross, Al (1993), The Escort Carrier Gambier Bay, Anatomy of the Ship, London, England: Conway Maritime Press, ISBN 9781557502353
- Y'Blood, William (2012), The Little Giants: U.S. Escort Carriers Against Japan, Annapolis, Maryland: Naval Institute Press, ISBN 9781612512471
