= USS Munda =

Casablanca-class escort carrier of the US Navy

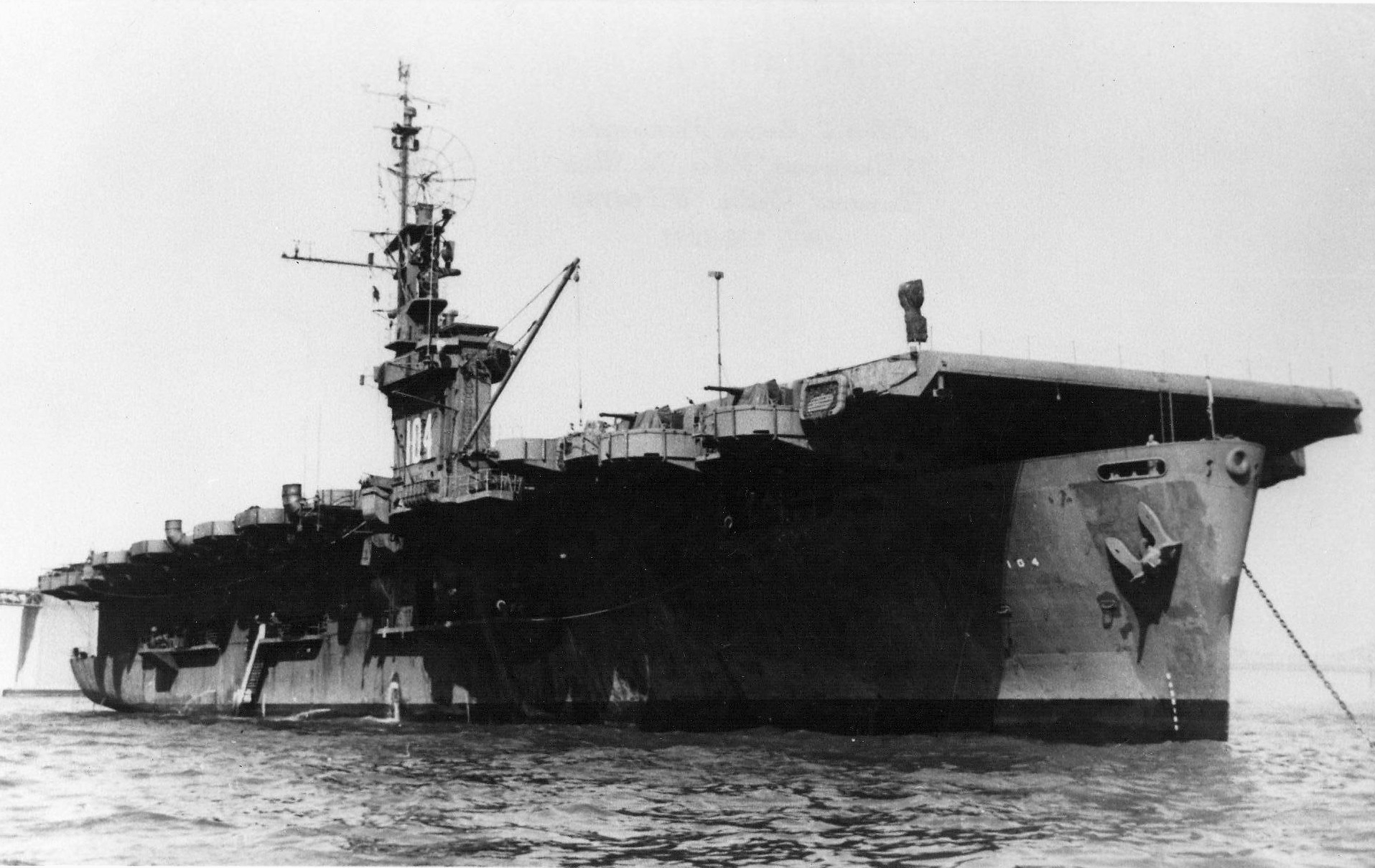
- USS Munda (CVE-104) in San Francisco Bay, 1945

History

United States
- Name: Tonowek Bay; Munda
- Namesake: Tonowek Bay, Prince of Wales Island, Alaska; Battle of Munda Point
- Ordered: as a Type S4-S2-BB3 hull, MCE hull 1141
- Awarded: 18 June 1942
- Builder: Kaiser Shipyards
- Laid down: 29 March 1944
- Launched: 27 May 1944
- Commissioned: 8 July 1944
- Decommissioned: 24 April 1946
- Stricken: 1 September 1958
- Identification: Hull symbol: CVE-104
- Honors and awards: 1 Battle star
- Fate: Sold for scrap on 17 June 1960

General characteristics
- Class & type: Casablanca-class escort carrier
- Displacement: 8,188 long tons (8,319 t) (standard); 10,902 long tons (11,077 t) (full load)
- Length: 512 ft 3 in (156.13 m) (oa); 490 ft (150 m) (wl); 474 ft (144 m) (fd)
- Beam: 65 ft 2 in (19.86 m); 108 ft (33 m) (extreme width)
- Draft: 20 ft 9 in (6.32 m) (max)
- Installed power: 4 × Babcock & Wilcox boilers; 9,000 shp (6,700 kW)
- Propulsion: 2 × Skinner Unaflow reciprocating steam engines; 2 × screws
- Speed: 19 knots (35 km/h; 22 mph)
- Range: 10,240 nmi (18,960 km; 11,780 mi) at 15 kn (28 km/h; 17 mph)
- Complement: Total: 910 – 916 officers and men; Embarked Squadron: 50 – 56; Ship's Crew: 860
- Armament: As designed: 1 × 5 in (127 mm)/38 cal dual-purpose gun; 4 × twin 40 mm (1.57 in) Bofors anti-aircraft guns; 12 × 20 mm (0.79 in) Oerlikon anti-aircraft cannons; Varied, ultimate armament: 1 × 5 in (127 mm)/38 cal dual-purpose gun; 8 × twin 40 mm (1.57 in) Bofors anti-aircraft guns; 20 × 20 mm (0.79 in) Oerlikon anti-aircraft cannons
- Aircraft carried: 27 (combat functionality)
- Aviation facilities: 1 × catapult; 2 × elevators

Service record
- Part of: United States Pacific Fleet (1944–1946); Pacific Reserve Fleet (1946–1958)
- Operations: Operation Magic Carpet

USS Munda (CVE-104) was the last of fifty United States Navy (USN) Casablanca-class escort carrier built for service during World War II. She was named after the Battle of Munda Point, which occurred on the island New Georgia, a part of the Solomon Islands in 1943. The ship was launched in May 1944, and commissioned in July, and served as an aircraft transport and as a replenishment escort carrier in the Pacific Theatre. Postwar, she participated in Operation Magic Carpet, the repatriation of U.S. forces from bases scattered around the Pacific. She was decommissioned in April 1946, when she was mothballed in the Pacific Reserve Fleet. Ultimately, she was sold for scrapping in June 1960.

== Design and description ==
A side profile of the design of Thetis Bay.

Munda was a Casablanca-class escort carrier, the most numerous type of aircraft carriers ever built. Built to stem heavy losses during the Battle of the Atlantic, they came into service in late 1943, by which time the U-boat threat was already in retreat. Although some did see service in the Atlantic, the majority were utilized in the Pacific, ferrying aircraft, providing logistics support, and conducting close air support for the island-hopping campaigns. The Casablanca-class carriers were built on the standardized Type S4-S2-BB3 hull, a lengthened variant of the Doyen-class hull, and specifically designed to be mass-produced using welded prefabricated sections. This allowed them to be produced at unprecedented speeds: the final ship of her class, Munda, was delivered to the Navy just 101 days after the laying of her keel.

Munda was 512 ft 3 in (156.13 m) long overall (490 ft (150 m) at the waterline), had a beam of 65 ft 2 in (19.86 m), and a draft of 20 ft 9 in (6.32 m). She displaced 8,188 long tons (8,319 t) standard, which increased to 10,902 long tons (11,077 t) with a full load. To carry out flight operations, the ship had a 257 ft (78 m) hangar deck and a 474 ft (144 m) flight deck. Her compact size necessitated the installation of an aircraft catapult at her bow, and there were two aircraft elevators to facilitate movement of aircraft between the flight and hangar deck: one each fore and aft.

She was powered by four Babcock & Wilcox Express D boilers that raised 285 psi (1,970 kPa) of steam at 577 °F (303 °C). The steam generated by these boilers fed two Skinner Unaflow reciprocating steam engines, delivering 9,000 hp (6,700 kW) to two propeller shafts. This allowed her to reach speeds of 19 kn (35 km/h; 22 mph), with a cruising range of 10,240 nmi (18,960 km; 11,780 mi) at 15 kn (28 km/h; 17 mph). For armament, one 5 in (127 mm)/38 caliber dual-purpose gun was mounted on the stern. Additional anti-aircraft defense was provided by eight Bofors 40 mm (1.57 in) anti-aircraft guns in single mounts and twelve Oerlikon 20 mm (0.79 in) cannons mounted around the perimeter of the deck. By 1945, Casablanca-class carriers had been modified to carry twenty Oerlikon cannons and sixteen Bofors guns; the doubling of the latter was accomplished by putting them into twin mounts. Sensors onboard consisted of a SG surface-search radar and a SK air-search radar.

Although Casablanca-class escort carriers were intended to function with a crew of 860 and an embarked squadron of 50 to 56, the exigencies of wartime often necessitated the inflation of the crew count. They were designed to operate with 27 aircraft, but the hangar deck could accommodate much more during transport or training missions.

== Construction ==
She was laid down on 29 March 1944, under a Maritime Commission contract, MC hull 1141, by the Kaiser Shipbuilding Company, Vancouver, Washington. The vessel was originally designated ACV-104, but was redesignated CVE-104 on 15 July 1943. She was initially named after Tonowek Bay, located within Prince of Wales Island, Alaska, 23 September 1943, and renamed Munda on 6 November 1943, in honor of the Battle of Munda Point, in the Solomon Islands, which was fought in July and August of that year. Munda was launched on 27 May 1944, sponsored by Mrs. James E. Dyer, to be accepted and commissioned on 8 July 1944, under the command of Captain L. A. Pope.

== Service history ==
=== World War II ===
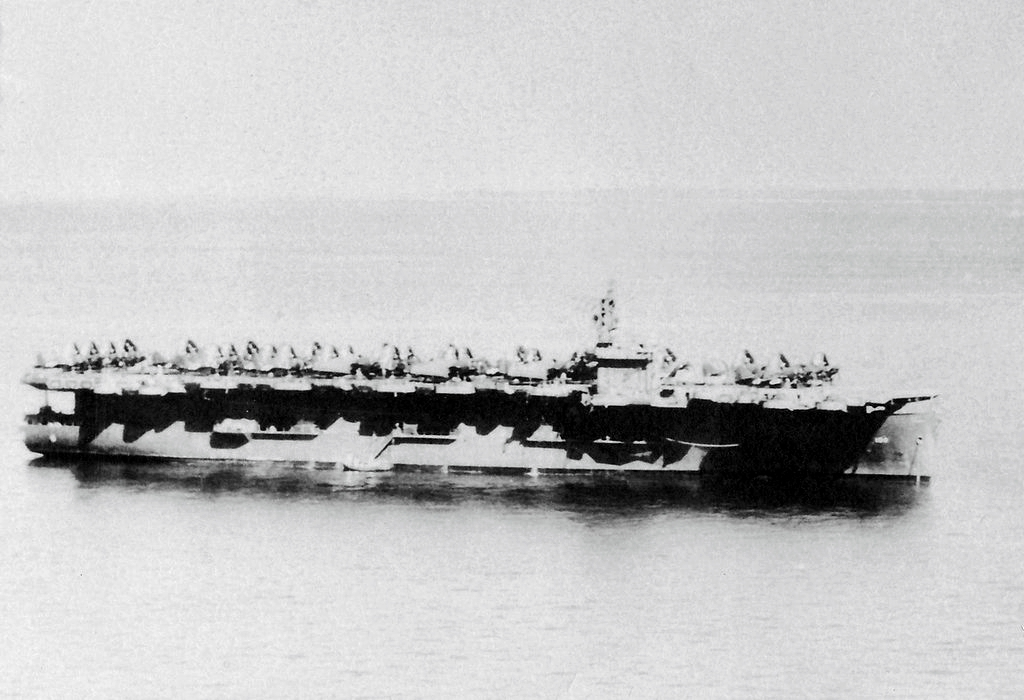
Munda transporting a load of aircraft, c. 1945.

Upon being commissioned, Munda underwent a shakedown cruise down the West Coast. She was then assigned to Carrier Transport Squadron Pacific, which shuttled aircraft and crew to bases in the West Pacific. On 16 August, she departed the West Coast, carrying 71 aircraft and 251 military passengers. She steamed for the island of Espiritu Santo, in the New Hebrides, arriving on 1 September. She then stopped at Finschhafen and Manus Island, both part of the Territory of New Guinea, before heading back to the West Coast. She proceeded to Alameda, California, where she made a brief layover. She then made another transport run, arriving back on 5 December, before making a third run on 12 December. She made three more runs until mid-1945, for six transport missions in total. During one of these runs, Captain Welton Dana Rowley took over command of the vessel on 13 May 1945. On 3 July, she sailed for Eniwetok, of the Marshall Islands, where she was assigned to become a replenishment escort carrier, supporting the Third Fleet's frontline Fast Carrier Task Force as part of Task Group 30.8, the Fleet Oiler and Transport Carrier Group. Replenishment escort carriers such as Munda enabled the frontline carriers to replace battle losses, and to stay at sea for longer durations.

Munda met Task Group 30.8 on 20 July, and began to provide aircraft to replace losses sustained in raids against the Japanese home islands. The replenishment escort carrier fleet would meet with the Fast Carrier Task Force on designated rendezvous days, during which supplies, munitions, and aircraft would be transferred. During this time, she was anchored off Guam, where she received aircraft, munitions, and other supplies. She stopped at Guam on 26 July, before rejoining her task group on 3 August. She met with, and resupplied the Third Fleet on 3 August, 7 August, and 11 August. She departed her formation on 13 August, to head back to Guam and was en route, when the Japanese surrender was announced. After rejoining her task group, she supported the landings of Allied forces in the occupation of Japan, remaining on station through the first week of the occupation. On 10 September, she steamed into Tokyo Bay, shortly after the signing of the official surrender document.

Munda departed Tokyo Bay on 2 October, whereupon she joined the Operation Magic Carpet fleet, which repatriated U.S. servicemen from around the Pacific. She took part in several Magic Carpet runs until 1946, when she was released from the fleet. She proceeded to Port Angeles, Washington, arriving on 18 January 1946. There, inactivation work was conducted, and she was subsequently decommissioned on 13 September, and mothballed as part of the Pacific Reserve Fleet. She was redesignated as a utility aircraft carrier, CVU-104, on 12 June 1955. She was transferred to Bremerton, Washington on 29 April 1958. There, she was struck from the Navy list on 1 September, and sold for scrapping on 17 June 1960 to General Ore Co., New York. She was ultimately broken up in Japan throughout October 1960. She received one battle star for her World War II service.

== Sources ==
=== Online sources ===
- "Munda (CVE-104)". Dictionary of American Naval Fighting Ships. Naval History and Heritage Command. 27 April 2016. Archived from the original on 7 July 2019.
- "Kaiser Vancouver, Vancouver WA". ShipbuildingHistory.com. 27 November 2010. Archived from the original on 16 June 2019.
- "World Aircraft Carriers List: US Escort Carriers, S4 Hulls". Hazegray.org. 14 December 1998. Archived from the original on 19 November 2021.
- Peña, Fabio (12 November 2019). "USS Munda (CVE-104) (later CVU-104) – Commanding Officers". NavSource.

=== Bibliography ===
- Adcock, Al (1996), Escort Carriers in Action - Warships No. 9, Carrollton, Texas: Squadron/Signal Publications, ISBN 9780897473569
- Chesneau, Robert; Gardiner, Robert (1980), Conway's All the World's Fighting Ships 1922–1946, London, England: Naval Institute Press, ISBN 9780870219139
- Friedman, Norman (1983), U.S. Aircraft Carriers: An Illustrated Design History, Annapolis, Maryland: Naval Institute Press, ISBN 9780870217395
- Ross, Al (1993), The Escort Carrier Gambier Bay, Anatomy of the Ship, London, England: Conway Maritime Press, ISBN 9781557502353
- Y'Blood, William (2012), The Little Giants: U.S. Escort Carriers Against Japan, Annapolis, Maryland: Naval Institute Press, ISBN 9781612512471
