= Air & Space/Smithsonian =

American magazine

- March 2003 cover of Air & Space/Smithsonian
- Editor: Linda Musser Shiner
- Categories: aviation, human spaceflight, history, current events
- Frequency: 4 per year
- Publisher: Smithsonian Enterprises
- Total circulation: 192,158 (2013)
- First issue: April 20, 1986; 40 years ago
- Final issue: 2022; 4 years ago
- Country: United States
- Based in: Washington, D.C., U.S.
- Language: American English
- Website: www.airspacemag.com
- ISSN: 0886-2257
- OCLC: 1054386888

Air & Space/Smithsonian was a bi-monthly magazine published by the National Air and Space Museum in Washington, D.C., United States. Its first publication was in April 1986. The magazine covered historical and present aviation and space travel. It also covered military aviation and aeronautical technology. It ceased publication in 2022 and was replaced by Air & Space Quarterly, available free online and in print to National Air and Space Museum members.
