= USS Kadashan Bay =

Casablanca-class escort carrier of the US Navy

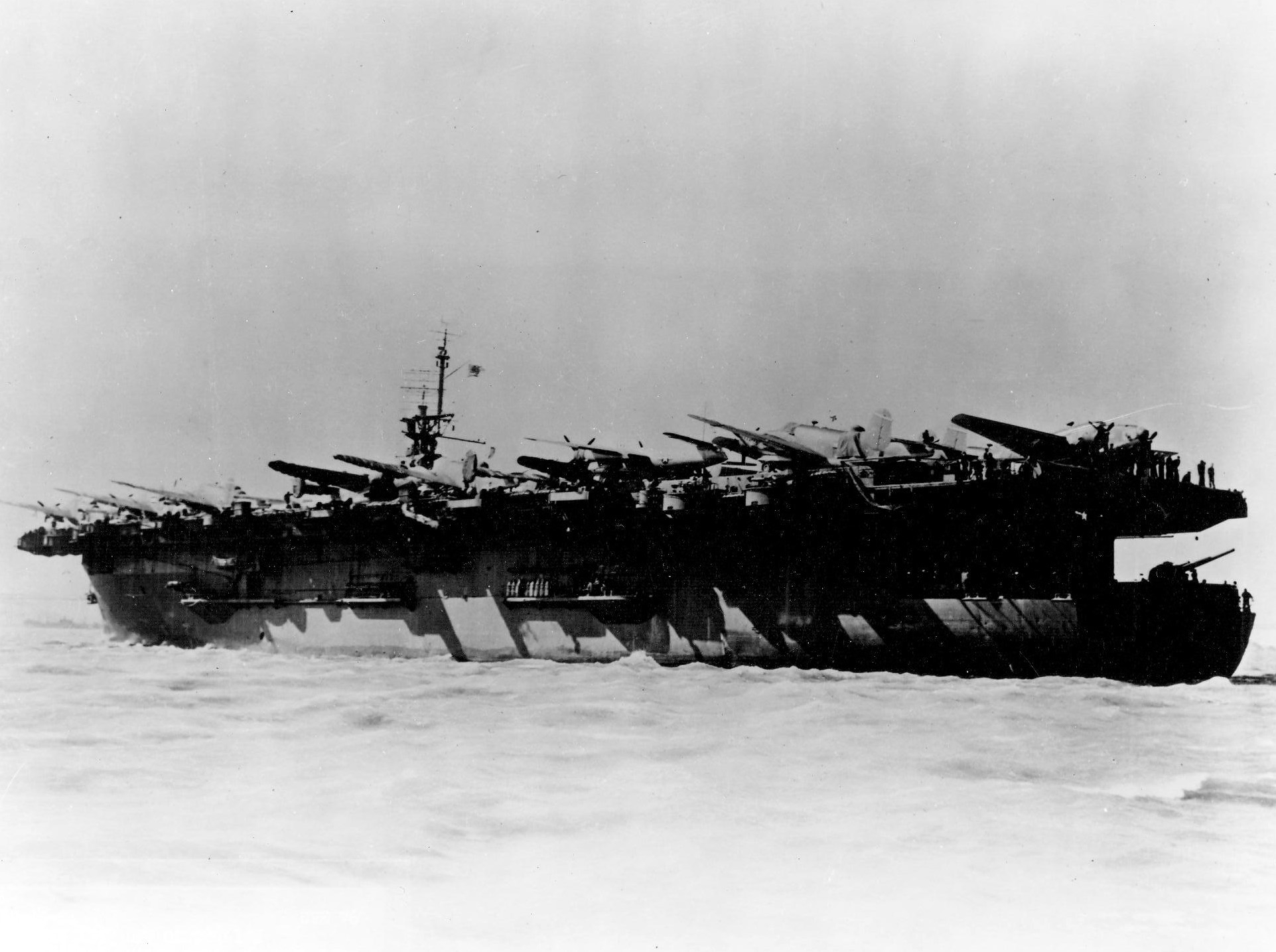
- USS Kadashan Bay underway, circa 1945

History

United States
- Name: Kadashan Bay
- Namesake: Kadashan Bay, Chichagof Island
- Ordered: as a Type S4-S2-BB3 hull, MCE hull 1113
- Awarded: 18 June 1942
- Builder: Kaiser Shipyards
- Laid down: 2 September 1943
- Launched: 11 December 1943
- Commissioned: 18 January 1944
- Decommissioned: 14 June 1946
- Stricken: 1 August 1959
- Identification: Hull symbol: CVE-76
- Honors and awards: 2 Battle stars
- Fate: Sold for scrap, February 1960

General characteristics
- Class & type: Casablanca-class escort carrier
- Displacement: 8,188 long tons (8,319 t) (standard); 10,902 long tons (11,077 t) (full load)
- Length: 512 ft 3 in (156.13 m) (oa); 490 ft (150 m) (wl); 474 ft (144 m) (fd)
- Beam: 65 ft 2 in (19.86 m); 108 ft (33 m) (extreme width)
- Draft: 20 ft 9 in (6.32 m) (max)
- Installed power: 4 × Babcock & Wilcox boilers; 9,000 shp (6,700 kW)
- Propulsion: 2 × Skinner Unaflow reciprocating steam engines; 2 × screws
- Speed: 19 knots (35 km/h; 22 mph)
- Range: 10,240 nmi (18,960 km; 11,780 mi) at 15 kn (28 km/h; 17 mph)
- Complement: Total: 910 – 916 officers and men; Embarked Squadron: 50 – 56; Ship's Crew: 860
- Armament: As designed: 1 × 5 in (127 mm)/38 cal dual-purpose gun; 4 × twin 40 mm (1.57 in) Bofors anti-aircraft guns; 12 × 20 mm (0.79 in) Oerlikon anti-aircraft cannons; Varied, ultimate armament: 1 × 5 in (127 mm)/38 cal dual-purpose gun; 8 × twin 40 mm (1.57 in) Bofors anti-aircraft guns; 20 × 20 mm (0.79 in) Oerlikon anti-aircraft cannons
- Aircraft carried: 27
- Aviation facilities: 1 × catapult; 2 × elevators

Service record
- Part of: United States Pacific Fleet (1943–1946); Atlantic Reserve Fleet (1946–1959)
- Operations: Mariana and Palau Islands campaign; Philippines campaign; Battle off Samar; Invasion of Lingayen Gulf; Operation Magic Carpet

USS Kadashan Bay (CVE-76) was a Casablanca-class escort carrier of the United States Navy. It was named after Kadashan Bay, located within Chichagof Island. The bay in turn was named after Paul K. Kadashan, an Alaskan Indian who established a homestead incorporating the bay in 1915. Launched in December 1943, and commissioned in January 1944, she served in support of the Mariana and Palau Islands campaign, the Battle off Samar, and the Invasion of Lingayen Gulf. Postwar, she participated in Operation Magic Carpet. She was decommissioned in June 1946, when she was mothballed in the Atlantic Reserve Fleet. Ultimately, she was sold for scrapping in February 1960.

== Design and description ==
A side profile of the design of Thetis Bay.

Kadashan Bay was a Casablanca-class escort carrier, the most numerous type of aircraft carriers ever built. Built to stem heavy losses during the Battle of the Atlantic, they came into service in late 1943, by which time the U-boat threat was already in retreat. Although some did see service in the Atlantic, the majority were utilized in the Pacific, ferrying aircraft, providing logistics support, and conducting close air support for the island-hopping campaigns. The Casablanca-class carriers were built on the standardized Type S4-S2-BB3 hull, a lengthened variant of the Doyen-class hull, and specifically designed to be mass-produced using welded prefabricated sections. This allowed them to be produced at unprecedented speeds: the final ship of her class, Munda, was delivered to the Navy just 101 days after the laying of her keel.

Kadashan Bay was 512 ft 3 in (156.13 m) long overall (490 ft (150 m) at the waterline), had a beam of 65 ft 2 in (19.86 m), and a draft of 20 ft 9 in (6.32 m). She displaced 8,188 long tons (8,319 t) standard, which increased to 10,902 long tons (11,077 t) with a full load. To carry out flight operations, the ship had a 257 ft (78 m) hangar deck and a 474 ft (144 m) flight deck. Her compact size necessitated the installation of an aircraft catapult at her bow, and there were two aircraft elevators to facilitate movement of aircraft between the flight and hangar deck: one each fore and aft.

She was powered by four Babcock & Wilcox Express D boilers that raised 285 psi (1,970 kPa) of steam at 577 °F (303 °C). The steam generated by these boilers fed two Skinner Unaflow reciprocating steam engines, delivering 9,000 hp (6,700 kW) to two propeller shafts. This allowed her to reach speeds of 19 kn (35 km/h; 22 mph), with a cruising range of 10,240 nmi (18,960 km; 11,780 mi) at 15 kn (28 km/h; 17 mph). For armament, one 5 in (127 mm)/38 caliber dual-purpose gun was mounted on the stern. Additional anti-aircraft defense was provided by eight Bofors 40 mm (1.57 in) anti-aircraft guns in single mounts and twelve Oerlikon 20 mm (0.79 in) cannons mounted around the perimeter of the deck. By 1945, Casablanca-class carriers had been modified to carry twenty Oerlikon cannons and sixteen Bofors guns; the doubling of the latter was accomplished by putting them into twin mounts. Sensors onboard consisted of a SG surface-search radar and a SK air-search radar.

Although Casablanca-class escort carriers were intended to function with a crew of 860 and an embarked squadron of 50 to 56, the exigencies of wartime often necessitated the inflation of the crew count. They were designed to operate with 27 aircraft, but the hangar deck could accommodate much more during transport or training missions.

During the Mariana and Palau Islands campaign, she carried 16 FM-2 fighters, and 11 TBM-1C torpedo bombers, for a total of 27 aircraft. However, during the Battle off Samar, she carried 24 FM-2 fighters and 9 TBM-1C torpedo bombers for a total of 33 aircraft. During the Invasion of Lingayen Gulf, she carried 22 FM-2 fighters, 11 TBM-1C torpedo bombers, and a TBM-1CP reconnaissance plane.

== Construction ==
The escort carrier was laid down on 2 September 1943, under a Maritime Commission contract, MC hull 1113, by Kaiser Shipbuilding Company, Vancouver, Washington. She was named Kadashan Bay, as part of a tradition which named escort carriers after bays or sounds in Alaska. She was launched on 11 December 1943; sponsored by Miss Audrey Ackerman; transferred to the United States Navy and commissioned on 18 January 1944, with Captain Robert Nisbet Hunter in command.

== Service history ==
Upon being commissioned, Kadashan Bay underwent a shakedown cruise off of San Diego. On 6 March, she departed San Diego on a cruise to Espiritu Santo. She made two runs, transporting 154 aircraft, before returning to San Diego on 13 May. Following a brief period of repairs and training, the escort carrier sailed on 10 July to join a Task Group 32.7 at Pearl Harbor. This task group was formed in preparation for the imminent Mariana and Palau Islands campaign. As a part of Carrier Division 27, under the command of Rear Admiral William Sample, she sailed alongside Ommaney Bay, Savo Island, and Marcus Island, which served as the flagship. In August, she sailed for Tulagi, where final preparations were made for the imminent invasion.

Her task group departed Tulagi on 6 September, arriving off of Peleliu on 11 September. There, the escort carriers launched airstrikes to destroy defenses and to prepare the way for landings, although the impact by these bombings proved to be insufficient. The marines landed on 15 September, seizing the air field, and finding themselves in a battle of attrition against a determined Japanese garrison. Kadashan Bay stayed offshore the island, providing close air support until the beginning of October, when she retired to Manus to restock on supplies. After a short period of rest, she steamed towards Leyte Gulf on 14 October, providing cover for Task Group 78.6, a reinforcement group which would stay offshore of Leyte.

Upon arriving on 21 October and joining Taffy 2, she began conducting airstrikes in support of troops which had already landed. On 25 October, one of her fighters, piloted by Ensign Hans L. Jensen, on a routine patrol mission, sighted the Central Force of the Japanese fleet off of Samar. After reporting his sighting, he launched an unsupported attack against the leading cruiser, beginning the decisive Battle off Samar. Once learning of the size and the importance of the Japanese fleet, she launched three fighter and three torpedo strikes against the Japanese force, which was threatening Taffy 3. The large number of American planes was a contributing force in convincing Vice admiral Takeo Kurita to retire, and to not take advantage of his position. On 30 October, she retired for Manus, where she arrived on 3 November.

In late November, the escort carriers began departing Manus and congregating at Kossol Roads, and on 10 December, she sortied for Mindoro. From 12 to 13 December, she transited the Surigao Strait, and as she moved west, her task group came under heavy aerial attack. In these actions, her fighters accounted for eleven planes, with running battles continuing to the end of December. By now, preparations were underway for the Invasion of Lingayen Gulf. As part of Vice Admiral Daniel E. Barbey's San Fabian task group, she provided air cover for the ships as they proceeded behind the main force. Eventually, she rendezvoused with the main force covering the landings on 3 January 1945.

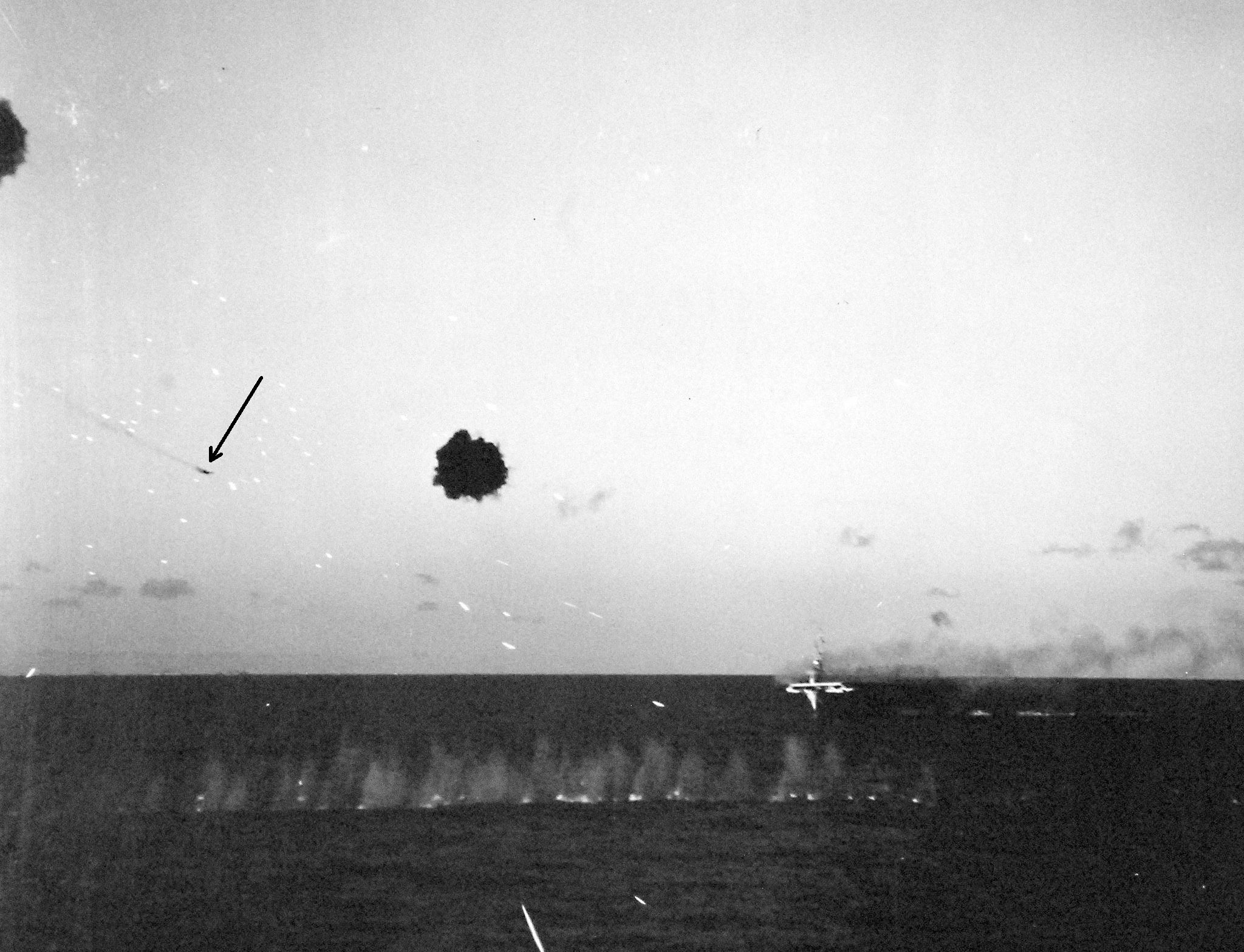
Kadashan Bay with a Nakajima Ki-43 kamikaze aircraft diving towards it. Heavy anti-aircraft fire is visible. Photographed from Marcus Island.

Kadashan Bay arrived off of Luzon on 8 January, where she prepared to commence operations. At 7:00 that morning, she, along with Marcus Island, launched two squadrons of fighters. At 7:16, radar detected a large contingent of Japanese aircraft, 50 mi (80 km) to the east of the task group, which separated into three groups. The fighters moved to intercept, with other escort carriers contributing their own fighters. At 7:46, Kadashan Bay finished launching her last four fighters, and as they struggled for altitude, a Nakajima Ki-43 kamikaze aircraft dove towards the carrier. Whilst the newly launched fighters were helpless against the first kamikaze, they did manage to shoot down a different kamikaze, a Kawasaki Ki-61 fighter which attempted to follow up on Kadashan Bay.

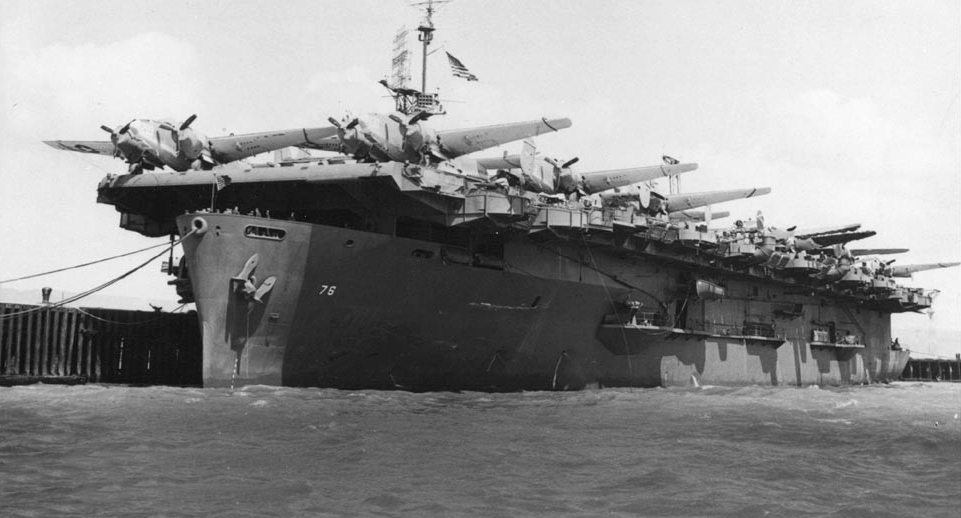
Kadashan Bay, having finished overhaul, at San Francisco on 8 April 1945.

The Nakajima Ki-43 that the fighter crews had spotted were also noticed by the crew of Kadashan Bay. The crew observed the plane break away from an engagement several miles east, and head straight towards the carrier. Consequently, the ship's crew started a hard left turn in an attempt to stall for time. Although the aircraft came under heavy anti-aircraft fire, it continued, aiming directly for the carrier's bridge. Perhaps as a result of the concentrated fire, it then plunged down, striking below the bridge at the waterline, tearing a 9 ft (2.7 m) by 17.5 ft (5.3 m) hole, destroying the junior officers' quarters. The kamikaze sparked a brief gasoline fire, which was quickly put under control. A more pressing concern was flooding, which was accentuated by the ship's turn. Her gasoline system was inoperative, and her bow sank 7 ft (2.1 m) below design specifications. Remarkably, no-one was killed, and only three crewmen were wounded by the kamikaze. Nonetheless, the damage forced Kadashan Bay to retire from operations. On 10 January, she transferred her aircraft contingent to Marcus Island, and she returned to Leyte on 12 January for temporary repairs.

On 13 February, she arrived at San Diego for further repairs, and then reported at San Francisco for complete overhaul. Once overhaul was finished, she sailed for Pearl Harbor on 8 April, where she arrived on 14 April. She would spend the rest of the war ferrying aircraft and men throughout the Pacific. During July the escort carrier was designated as a replenishment carrier for the Third Fleet. She was en route from Pearl Harbor to begin her new duty when the news of Japan's surrender was received.

=== Post-war ===
After the end of the war, Kadashan Bay joined Operation Magic Carpet, which repatriated U.S. servicemen from throughout the Pacific. She reported at Guam in September and arrived at San Francisco on 26 September with her first group of veterans. For the next three months, the escort carrier conducted Magic Carpet runs, stopping at Pearl Harbor, Guam, Okinawa, and China. She arrived at San Pedro on 22 December to finish her last Pacific cruise, and departed San Diego on 10 January 1946, bound for Boston. Kadashan Bay arrived at Boston on 29 January, was decommissioned on 14 June 1946, and subsequently placed in the Atlantic Reserve Fleet there. She was reclassified CVU-76 on 12 June 1955. She was redesignated as an aircraft ferry on 7 May 1959, and given the hull symbol AKV-26. She was struck from the Navy list on 1 August 1959 and sold for scrap to Comarket Inc. in February 1960. She was broken up in Hong Kong, starting June 1960.

== Sources ==
=== Online sources ===
- "Kadashan Bay (CVE-76)". Dictionary of American Naval Fighting Ships. Naval History and Heritage Command. 27 April 2016. Archived from the original on 30 June 2019.
- "Kaiser Vancouver, Vancouver WA". www.ShipbuildingHistory.com. 27 November 2010. Archived from the original on 16 June 2019.
- "World Aircraft Carriers List: US Escort Carriers, S4 Hulls". Hazegray.org. 14 December 1998. Archived from the original on 19 November 2021.

=== Bibliography ===
- Adcock, Al (1996), Escort Carriers in Action - Warships No. 9, Carrollton, Texas: Squadron/Signal Publications, ISBN 9780897473569
- Chesneau, Robert; Gardiner, Robert (1980), Conway's All the World's Fighting Ships 1922–1946, London, England: Naval Institute Press, ISBN 9780870219139
- Friedman, Norman (1983), U.S. Aircraft Carriers: An Illustrated Design History, Annapolis, Maryland: Naval Institute Press, ISBN 9780870217395
- Rielly, Robin (2010), Kamikaze Attacks of World War II: A Complete History of Japanese Suicide Strikes on American Ships, by Aircraft and Other Means, Jefferson, North Carolina: McFarland & Company, ISBN 9780786457724
- Ross, Al (1993), The Escort Carrier Gambier Bay, Anatomy of the Ship, London, England: Conway Maritime Press, ISBN 9781557502353
- Smith, Peter (2014), Kamikaze: To Die for the Emperor, Barnsley, England: Pen and Sword Books, ISBN 9781473847828
- Y'Blood, William (2012), The Little Giants: U.S. Escort Carriers Against Japan, Annapolis, Maryland: Naval Institute Press, ISBN 9781612512471
