= USS Marcus Island =

U.S. Navy Casablanca-class escort carrier

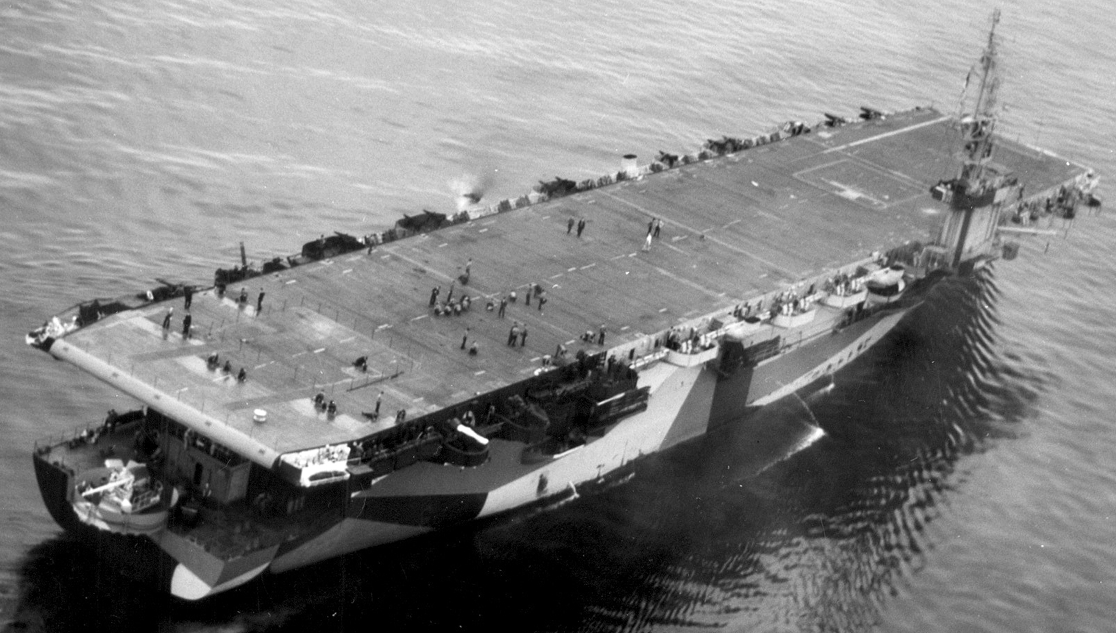
- Marcus Island in San Pedro Bay, 8 May 1944

History

United States
- Name: Kanalku Bay (1943); Marcus Island (1943–60)
- Namesake: Kanalku Bay, Admiralty Island, Alexander Archipelago, Alaska; Actions against Minami-Tori-shima (Marcus Island)
- Ordered: as a Type S4-S2-BB3 hull, MCE hull 1114
- Awarded: 18 June 1942
- Builder: Kaiser Shipbuilding Company, Vancouver, Washington, US
- Laid down: 15 September 1943
- Launched: 16 December 1943
- Commissioned: 26 January 1944
- Decommissioned: 12 December 1946
- Stricken: 1 September 1959
- Identification: Hull symbol: CVE-77 (1943–55); CVHE-77 (1955–59); AKV-27 (1959–60)
- Honors and awards: 4 Battle Stars, Navy Unit Commendation
- Fate: Sold for scrap, 29 February 1960

General characteristics
- Class & type: Casablanca-class escort carrier
- Displacement: 8,188 long tons (8,319 t) (standard); 10,902 long tons (11,077 t) (full load)
- Length: 512 ft 3 in (156.13 m) (oa); 490 ft (150 m) (wl); 474 ft (144 m) (fd)
- Beam: 65 ft 2 in (19.86 m); 108 ft (33 m) (extreme width)
- Draft: 20 ft 9 in (6.32 m) (max)
- Installed power: 4 × Babcock & Wilcox boilers; 9,000 shp (6,700 kW)
- Propulsion: 2 × Skinner Unaflow reciprocating steam engines; 2 × screws
- Speed: 19 knots (35 km/h; 22 mph)
- Range: 10,200 nmi (18,900 km; 11,700 mi) at 15 kn (28 km/h; 17 mph)
- Complement: 860 (ship's crew)
- Sensors & processing systems: 1 × SG radar, 1 × SK radar
- Armament: As designed: 1 × 5 in (127 mm)/38 cal dual-purpose gun; 4 × twin 40 mm (1.57 in) Bofors anti-aircraft guns; 12 × 20 mm (0.79 in) Oerlikon anti-aircraft cannons; Varied, ultimate armament: 1 × 5 in (127 mm)/38 cal dual-purpose gun; 8 × twin 40 mm (1.57 in) Bofors anti-aircraft guns; 20 × 20 mm (0.79 in) Oerlikon anti-aircraft cannons
- Aviation facilities: 1 × catapult; 2 × elevators

USS Marcus Island (CVE-77) was the twenty-third of fifty Casablanca-class escort carriers built for the United States Navy during World War II. She was named after U.S. actions against Minami-Tori-shima, which American maps labeled as Marcus Island. In September 1943, she was laid down at Vancouver, Washington, by the Kaiser Shipbuilding Company as Kanalku Bay. She was renamed Marcus Island in November 1943, launched in December, and commissioned in January 1944.

Marcus Island served in the Mariana and Palau Islands campaign, the Philippines campaign, and the Battle of Okinawa. She acted as the flagship for various escort carrier formations, serving as the headquarters for Rear Admirals William D. Sample and Felix Stump. During the Philippines campaign, she participated in the Battle off Samar and the Battle of Mindoro, surviving multiple close brushes with Japanese kamikazes. Post-war, she participated in Operation Magic Carpet, repatriating U.S. servicemen from throughout the Pacific. Marcus Island was decommissioned in December 1946, mothballed in the Atlantic Reserve Fleet, and sold for scrap in 1960.

== Design and description ==
A side profile of the design of Thetis Bay

Marcus Island was a Casablanca-class escort carrier, the most numerous type of aircraft carrier ever built. They were intended for anti-submarine warfare, coming into service in late 1943, by which time the U-boats were already in retreat. Some did see service in the Atlantic, but the majority were utilized in the Pacific, ferrying aircraft, providing logistics support, and conducting close air support for the island-hopping campaigns. They were built on the standardized Type S4-S2-BB3 hull, a lengthened variant of the Doyen-class hull, and specifically designed to be mass-produced using welded prefabricated sections. This allowed them to be produced at unprecedented speeds: the final ship of her class, Munda, was delivered to the Navy just 101 days after the laying of her keel.

Marcus Island was 512 ft 3 in (156.13 m) long overall and 490 ft (150 m) at the waterline. She had a beam of 65 ft 2 in (19.86 m), and a draft of 20 ft 9 in (6.32 m). She displaced 8,188 long tons (8,319 t) standard, which increased to 10,902 long tons (11,077 t) with a full load. To carry out flight operations, the ship had a 257 ft (78 m) hangar deck and a 474 ft (144 m) flight deck. Her compact size necessitated the installation of an aircraft catapult, positioned at her bow, and there were two aircraft elevators to facilitate movement of aircraft between the flight and hangar deck: one each fore and aft. She had two Skinner Unaflow reciprocating steam engines delivering 9,000 shp (6,700 kW) to two propellers for a top speed of 19 kn (35 km/h; 22 mph). Her armament consisted of one 5 in (127 mm)/38 caliber dual-purpose gun, eight Bofors 40 mm (1.57 in) guns, and twelve Oerlikon 20 mm (0.79 in) cannons, supported by an SG surface-search radar and an SK air-search radar. By 1945, the standard armament for the Casablanca-class carriers had grown to twenty Oerlikon cannons and sixteen Bofors guns.

== Construction ==
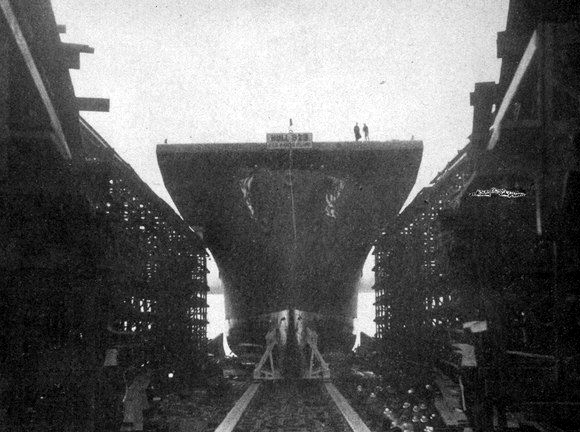
Marcus Island being launched from a building berth on 16 December 1943

Marcus Island was laid down under the name Kanalku Bay on 15 September 1943 as MCE hull 1114, the twenty-third of a series of fifty Casablanca-class escort carriers. She was renamed Marcus Island on 6 November and launched on 16 December, sponsored by Louise LaHache, the widow of Captain Samuel LaHache. She was transferred to the Navy and commissioned on 26 January 1944. In total, her construction and outfitting cost $7,368,661 (equivalent to $106,523,000 in 2024).

== Service history ==
=== Mariana and Palau Islands ===
After commissioning, Marcus Island fitted out at Naval Station Tongue Point in Astoria, Oregon. On 17 February, she started a shakedown cruise down the West Coast, which ended in San Diego, California, on 1 March. On 8 March, she was assigned to ferry aircraft to Pearl Harbor, returning to San Diego on 27 March. She then ferried a load of aircraft from Naval Air Station Alameda to San Diego, finishing on 4 April. There, Composite Squadron (VC) 21 was taken on board for carrier flight training that lasted until 13 April, after which her crew began a period of post-shakedown availability. She steamed northwards on 9 May for Alameda, whereupon she conducted a ferry mission to the Solomon Islands. Back at San Diego on 1 July, she entered drydock to have her hull repainted.

Marcus Island embarked VC-21 again on 12 July for carrier flight training. On 20 July, she stood out from San Diego, with VC-21, VC-80, and a cargo of aircraft on board. She unloaded VC-80 and her load of planes at Pearl Harbor on 26 July. There, she joined her sister ships Kadashan Bay, Savo Island, and Ommaney Bay to form Carrier Division 27. On 11 August, Rear Admiral William D. Sample made Marcus Island his flagship, and the following day, she left Hawaiian waters for the Solomon Islands, arriving at Tulagi on 24 August.

At Tulagi, Marcus Island's division was assigned to support the Marines participating in the landings on Peleliu and Angaur. She departed Tulagi on 1 September, commenced pre-invasion strikes on 12 September, and began close air support operations on 15 September, the day of the landings on Peleliu. She continued providing air cover and launching strikes until 2 October, when she retired to Manus in the Admiralty Islands, arriving on 4 October.

=== Philippines ===
==== Leyte ====
At Manus, Carrier Division 27 became part of Task Unit 77.4.2, more commonly known by its call sign, "Taffy 2". On 12 October, joined by the seventeen other escort carriers of Task Group 77.4, Marcus Island steamed for Leyte Gulf to support the landings on Leyte. Arriving off the island on 18 October, her aircraft carried out preparatory airstrikes and conducted combat air patrols. On 20 October, the day of the landings, Rear Admiral Sample insisted on accompanying one of her Avengers as it conducted a close air support mission. Sample's Avenger, loaded with eight rockets, took off at 07:45 to strike positions on Catmon Hill overlooking the landing beaches. As his Avenger circled at 5,000 ft (1,500 m) altitude following a rocket run, a shell hit his Avenger 12 in (30 cm) above the trailing edge of its right wing. Passing through the upper fuselage, the shell detonated just above the root of the left wing, tearing a large hole in the Avenger's flank. Sample was peppered with shrapnel that lacerated his head, right shoulder, and right arm. Nonetheless, the Avenger made it back to the carrier, although the plane was written off due to damage.

==== Battle off Samar ====
Fleet movements during the Battle of Leyte Gulf

On 23 October, the Battle of Leyte Gulf began. The bulk of the Japanese fleet had been concentrated to repel the Americans from the Philippines, the seizure of which would have cut the vital oil supply lines from Southeast Asia. Admiral William Halsey Jr., commander of the Third Fleet, encouraged by the prospect of destroying the Japanese carriers, had diverted his surface ships to engage the diversionary Northern Force. This left the San Bernardino Strait undefended, and on the early morning of 25 October, Vice Admiral Takeo Kurita's Center Force passed through unopposed. Within the Center Force's sights was Taffy 3, 20 mi (32 km) north of Marcus Island, which had been caught completely by surprise.

With Taffy 3 overmatched, Taffy 2 received permission from Admiral Thomas C. Kinkaid at 07:08 to divert its entire air group to join in the defense. Marcus Island only had two Avengers at hand, as at 05:45 she had sent out ten Avengers to airdrop supplies to the 96th Infantry Division. Nonetheless, she finished launching all her available aircraft at 08:08, dispatching two Avengers, each loaded with a Mark 13 torpedo, and fifteen Wildcats. One of her Avengers reported a hit on the port side, aft, of a heavy cruiser at around 08:45, (Note: The action report identifies the target as a Takao-class cruiser, but the sequence of events aligns with the sinking of Chikuma.) possibly the Tone-class cruiser Chikuma, "which appeared to go out of control". (Note: It is unclear as to which Avenger was responsible for the stern hit on Chikuma. Hornfischer attributes it to an Avenger from Manila Bay. The action report for Manila Bay's embarked squadron reports an Avenger conducting a torpedo run towards a Tone-class cruiser from her starboard quarter at approximately 09:15, which resulted in a torpedo hit near the stern. The cruiser is then described as "turning in a tight circle, seemingly out of control". The captain of Tone, Haruo Mayuzumi, reported: "Four torpedo planes executed extremely low-level attack on the Chikuma, two from each side ... Chikuma was maneuvering to evade the two torpedo planes which attacked first from the starboard side by turning in the direction of the planes. Two other torpedo planes made an extremely low level attack from the port side. Shortly thereafter a torpedo hit the stern. There was a burst of flame and simultaneously a column of water almost as high as the length of the ship ... Her guns kept firing and she circled around and signaled us her rudder has been knocked out.") Meanwhile, her fighters harassed the advancing Japanese ships and contested the airspace above the battle, shooting down three Aichi E13A seaplanes and two Mitsubishi A6M Zero fighters.

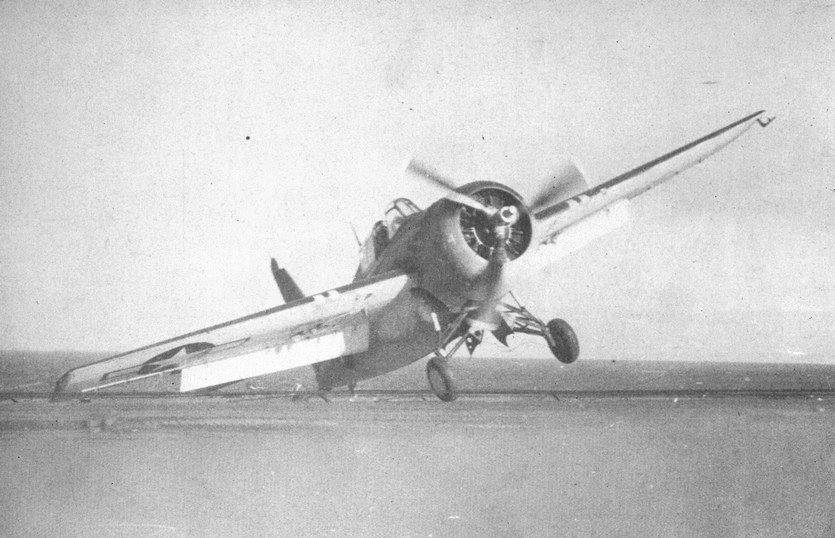
A Wildcat makes a bumpy landing on Marcus Island

During the battle, Marcus Island took on board seven Avengers from Taffy 3, rearming them with torpedoes. At 10:30, the Taffy 3 Avengers were joined by her own Avengers, returning from their resupply mission. By this time, the Center Force had already turned around. Of her returning Avengers, seven were each loaded with four 500 lb (230 kg) semi-armor piercing bombs and an eighth carried her last remaining torpedo. At 11:20, these eight of her Avengers and six of the Taffy 3 Avengers were launched to pursue the Japanese, and at around 13:00, they attacked a Japanese cruiser, straddling it with bombs.

While the American forces had been distracted by the Battle off Samar and its immediate aftermath, Vice Admiral Naomasa Sakonju's transport unit, which consisted of the Nagara-class cruiser Kinu, the Fubuki-class destroyer Uranami, and four transports, was unloading approximately 2,500 troops at Ormoc Bay, on the western coast of Leyte. The transport unit had finished unloading on the morning of 26 October, but the Japanese ships were sighted by American aircraft as they withdrew. A strike group of twenty-three Avengers and twenty-nine fighters, to which Marcus Island contributed twelve aircraft, was assembled to strike the transport unit. The strike group made contact at 10:00, bombing, rocketing, and strafing the transport unit. The two transport vessels that the Japanese ships were escorting were quickly sunk, and Uranami was sunk as she attempted to charge the wreckage of a downed Wildcat. Kinu proved to be more resilient, sinking in the aftermath of the attack at 17:30, southwest of Masbate Island. Early on 30 October, Marcus Island withdrew from Leyte for Manus.

==== Mindoro ====
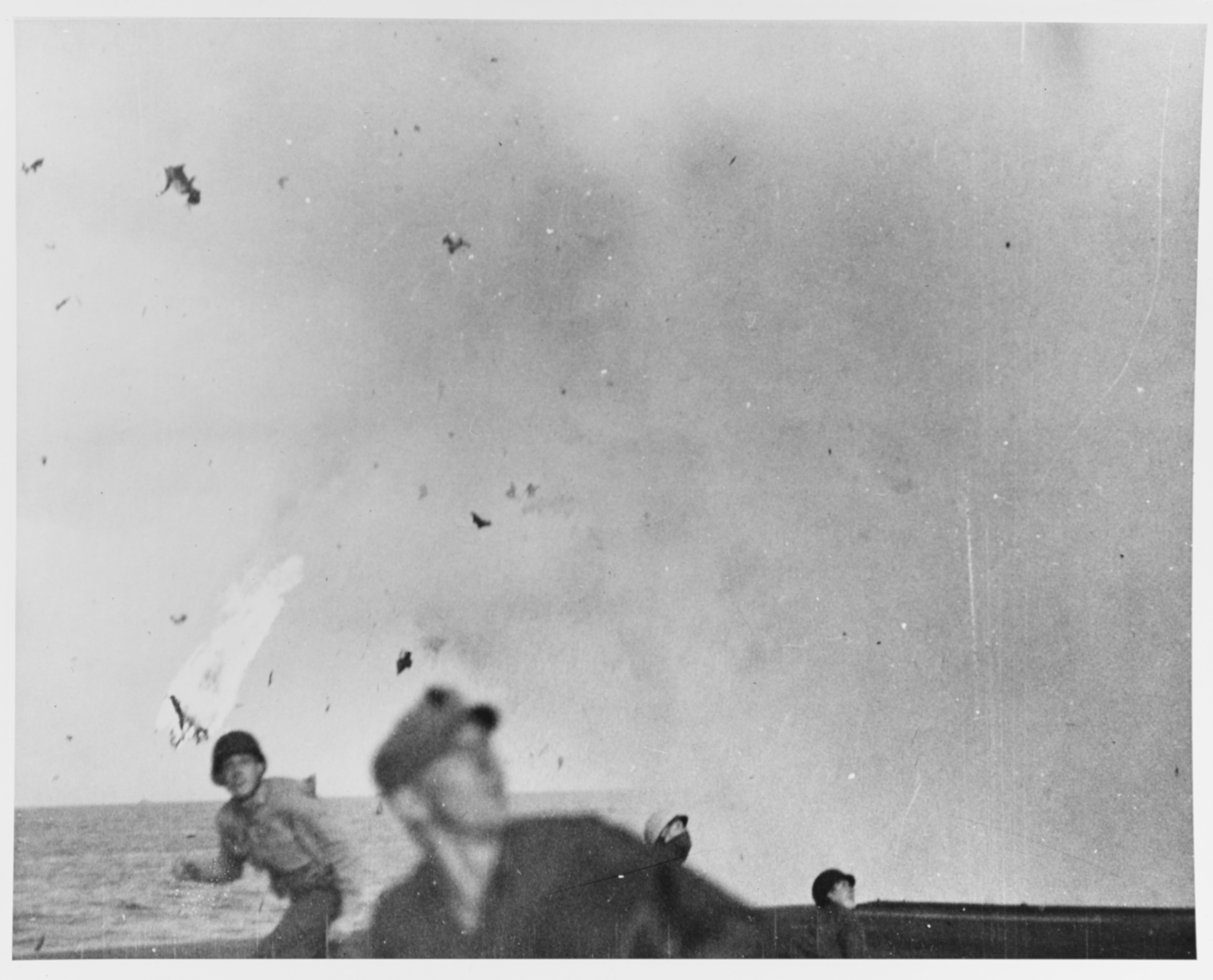
Crew on board Marcus Island scramble as a kamikaze passes

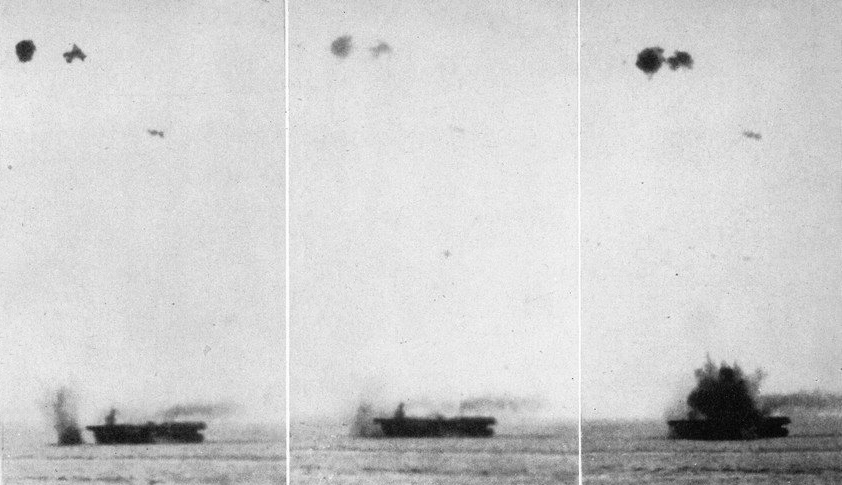
Marcus Island photographed from her starboard. The first kamikaze crashes off her starboard bow, while the second kamikaze explodes off her port bow.

Marcus Island entered Seeadler Harbor on 3 November, and replenished until 19 November, when Carrier Division 27 was assigned to Task Unit 77.4.6. Until 27 November, she provided air cover for convoys traveling near the eastern Philippines, which were being harassed by Japanese planes based on Mindanao. She resupplied at Naval Base Kossol Roads, and on 10 December, she steamed for Mindoro, providing air screening for the scheduled landings.

On 15 December, the morning of the Mindoro landings, Marcus Island's task unit came under intense attack. At 04:30, about 40 Japanese aircraft, roughly half kamikazes, half escorts, had taken off from Clark Field and Davao. At 08:00, the escort carriers turned back towards Leyte, having been relieved of their duties by land-based Army Air Forces aircraft, but they were pursued by the Japanese.

At 08:12, the Japanese planes made first contact, with a kamikaze shot down as it dove upon the Bagley-class destroyer Ralph Talbot. At 08:22, three Zeros were spotted approaching Marcus Island from the port quarter, at about 15,000 ft (4,600 m) in altitude. One Zero disappeared into a cloud, while the other two reoriented themselves towards her. Of the pair, one made a steep bank to remain at her port, completed a chandelle, and then dove from astern, aiming for a painted dummy aircraft elevator midway between her forward aircraft elevator and her bow. Her gunners scored hits on the aircraft 1,000 ft (300 m) out, which may have incapacitated the pilot, as the kamikaze skimmed just over her flight deck. As it passed, its wingtip clipped a lookout platform, decapitating one lookout and injuring another. It then crashed 20 ft (6.1 m) off her starboard bow and exploded underwater, sending a column of water into the air.

The other Zero had passed over Marcus Island to approach her from the starboard quarter, and as it dove, it also set its sights on the painted aircraft elevator. Buffeted by anti-aircraft fire, the kamikaze made a sudden 90° roll to port 500 ft (150 m) short of the carrier and careened into the water 30 ft (9.1 m) off her port bow. The kamikaze detonated upon impact, spraying shrapnel across the flight deck and injuring six of the carrier's crew. The two attacks had occurred only ten seconds apart. Damage from both was light.

At 09:30, Marcus Island came under attack again. A Yokosuka D4Y Suisei dive bomber began its dive against her from her starboard beam at an altitude of 4,000 ft (1,200 m). Swaying from side to side, the Suisei appeared to have trouble maintaining its aim. The bomb was released at an altitude of 800 to 1,000 ft (240 to 300 m) at a glide angle of 20°, missing astern of the carrier by 100 yd (91 m) and short by 40 ft (12 m). As the Suisei attempted to escape, it was shot down by anti-aircraft fire. On 18 December, she retired from operations, entering Kossol Roads on 19 December.

==== Lingayen Gulf ====
Marcus Island was back at Manus on 23 December, replenishing until 29 December, when she set off for Luzon to participate in the Invasion of Lingayen Gulf. Carrier Division 27 had been assigned to Task Unit 77.4.4, tasked with covering the convoys of the Sixth Army. For this mission, her division consisted of only two carriers, with Savo Island and Ommaney Bay having been transferred to the main escort carrier group.

On the afternoon of 5 January 1945, as the convoys passed through the Surigao Strait, the Fletcher-class destroyer Taylor sighted two torpedo wakes running towards the formation. Responding to the alarm, a plane from Marcus Island spotted the periscope of a midget submarine, and dropped a depth charge 60 ft (18 m) away, which left it listing. The submarine was finished off by a ramming attack from Taylor.

Marcus Island arrived in Lingayen Gulf on 6 January, where she provided an air screen to fend off potential kamikazes. The Lingayen operation was to be a costly one for the escort carriers. Miscommunication between Halsey's Third Fleet, Kinkaid's Seventh Fleet, and Douglas MacArthur's land-based Far East Air Forces meant that there was disagreement as to whose responsibility it was to neutralize the airfields on Luzon. This confusion allowed the Japanese to mount more kamikaze attacks than would otherwise have been possible.

During the early morning of 8 January, Marcus Island launched two divisions of fighters for combat air patrol. At 07:16, a large group of Japanese aircraft was detected approaching from the east, which separated into three distinct groups. Although her air contingent shot down four planes in a series of short engagements, a kamikaze dove and damaged Kadashan Bay, the other escort carrier in TU 77.4.4. Though the damage was not crippling, Kadashan Bay was still forced to transfer her remaining stock of aircraft to Marcus Island on 10 January and withdraw. As a result, Marcus Island joined Petrof Bay and Saginaw Bay to form Task Unit 77.4.6, the Close Covering Carrier Group.

Later, on the night of 8 January, Kitkun Bay was also damaged by a kamikaze, forcing her to withdraw. Combined with the earlier sinking of Ommaney Bay on 4 January, extra work was put onto the remaining escort carriers. On 8 January, Marcus Island recorded ninety-four planes launched and ninety-nine planes (Note: The five additional landings consist of aircraft transferred from Kadashan Bay.) recovered during operational hours, averaging a launching or landing every 3.8 minutes, setting a record for an escort carrier in combat.

On 9 January, the day of the landings, aircraft from Marcus Island sank two small Japanese coastal ships on the north shore of Luzon. On 17 January, land-based aircraft of the United States Army Air Forces took responsibility for operations over Luzon, relieving the escort carriers of Task Group 77.4. Of the eighteen escort carriers brought to the Lingayen landings, nine had come under kamikaze attacks, which sank Ommaney Bay and damaged five others. After being relieved from operations around Lingayen, Marcus Island joined Rear Admiral Russell S. Berkey's Close Covering Group, which was operating to the west of northern Mindoro. On 29 January, she supported landings in Zambales, on Luzon, which were unopposed. On 31 January, she headed to Ulithi in the Caroline Islands, arriving on 5 February.

=== Okinawa ===
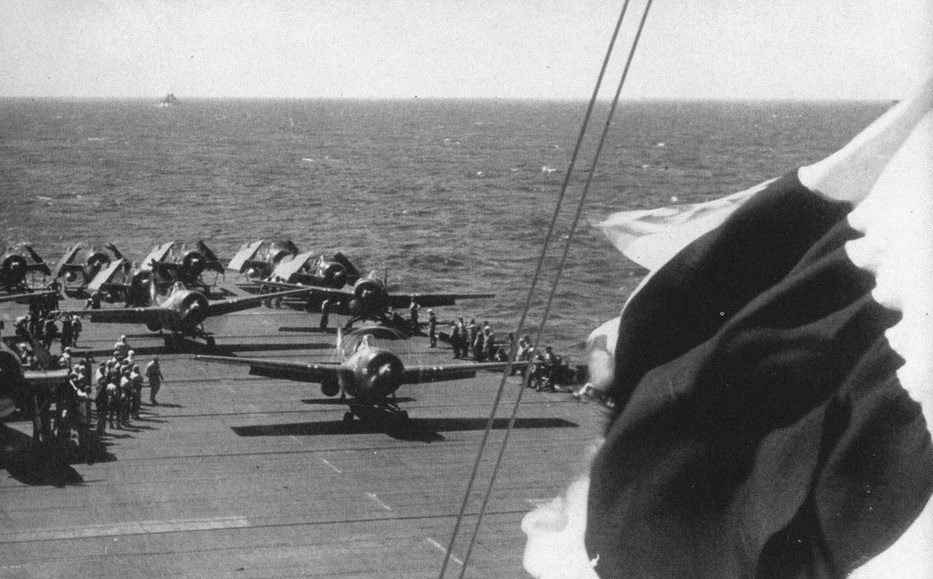
Aircraft ready for takeoff on Marcus Island

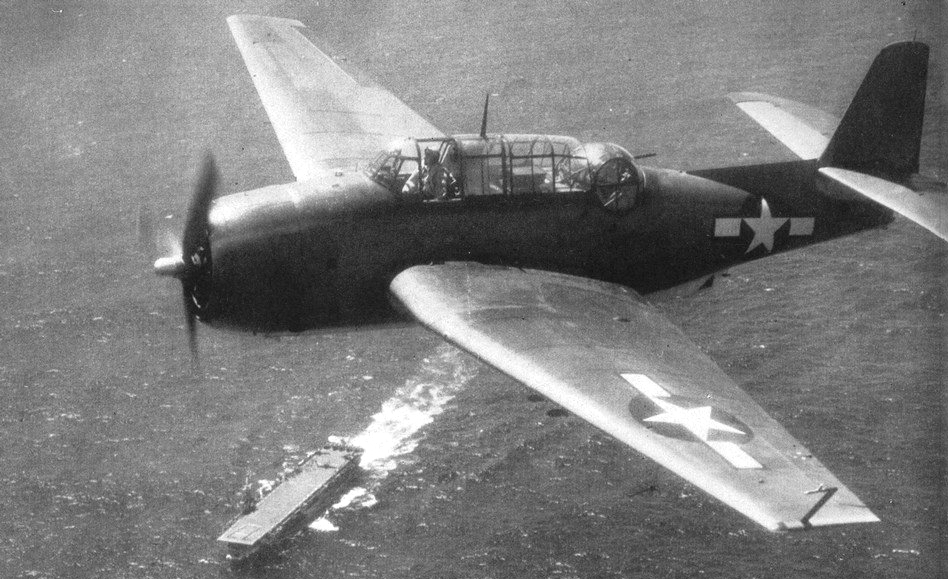
An Avenger overflies Marcus Island, 1945

On 6 February, Rear Admiral Sample left Marcus Island, but she maintained her status as flagship, embarking Rear Admiral Felix Stump, commander of Carrier Division 24. On 14 February, she exchanged air squadrons, unloading VC-21 and taking on VC-87. On 4 March, she steamed for Leyte, arriving on 7 March. There, rehearsals were conducted for Operation Iceberg, the planned landings on Okinawa.

The ships of Carrier Division 24 departed Leyte on 21 March, arriving in the waters off Okinawa on 26 March. Upon arrival, Marcus Island launched airstrikes in support of the 77th Infantry Division as it secured the Kerama Islands. At the end of March, her aircraft began shifting their strikes towards Okinawa Island itself in anticipation of the landings on 1 April. On 3 April, Wake Island was damaged by a kamikaze, and on 5 April, Marcus Island took on board Wake Island's embarked squadron, Composite Observation Squadron (VOC) 1. In turn, she transferred her aircraft contingent to Wake Island to be ferried back to Guam.

In April, the ship's air group conducted a range of missions over Okinawa, including artillery spotting for shore bombardment, strikes against Japanese installations, fighter cover, and close air support. On 29 April, she departed Okinawa in a convoy with Saginaw Bay and Savo Island. During the Battle of Okinawa, her aircraft had flown 1,085 sorties, shooting down eleven Japanese aircraft and destroying another thirteen grounded aircraft.

Marcus Island arrived at Guam on 3 May, where VOC-1 was transferred back to Wake Island. She took on a load of damaged aircraft, steaming on 5 May for the West Coast, arriving in San Diego on 22 May. There, she underwent a refit that lasted until 5 July. She sailed westward again on 10 July, ferrying troops and replacement aircraft to Pearl Harbor and Guam. She returned to Alameda on 15 August, the same day that the Japanese surrender was announced.

=== Post-war ===
Leaving Alameda on 25 August, Marcus Island was assigned to the Operation Magic Carpet fleet, which repatriated U.S. servicemen from throughout the Pacific. At Pearl Harbor, her hangar deck was converted into passenger accommodations, and with a reduction in the ship's crew, she had the capacity to berth 1,053 passengers. With the conversion complete, she transported an air squadron to Guam before proceeding to Okinawa, arriving on 28 September. There, she embarked returning troops and delivered them to San Francisco on 24 October. She then completed additional Magic Carpet runs to Guam and Pearl Harbor.

Marcus Island left San Diego on 12 January 1946, transiting the Panama Canal and stopping at Norfolk, arriving in Boston on 2 February. On 12 December, she was decommissioned and mothballed, joining the Boston group of the Atlantic Reserve Fleet, moored at the South Boston Naval Annex. Post-war, although all of the escort carriers found themselves ill-suited for the coming jet age, with the new generation of anti-submarine and ground-attack aircraft demanding greater deck lengths, the Casablanca-class escort carriers were in a particularly vulnerable spot. As compared to the Bogue-class escort carriers, which were fitted with a combination of diesel and steam machinery, and the Commencement Bay-class escort carriers, which were powered with standard geared turbines, the Casablanca-class escort carriers were, due to wartime exigencies, saddled with the Skinner Unaflow steam engines, which were both cumbersome and uneconomical. While some of the escort carriers found second lives during the Cold War as aviation transports and amphibious assault carriers, the majority of the Casablanca-class spent their remaining years in mothballs.

On 12 June 1955, she was redesignated as a helicopter aircraft carrier, receiving the hull symbol CVHE-77. On 7 May 1959, she was further redesignated as an aviation transport, receiving the hull symbol AKV-27. She was struck from the Navy list on 1 September 1959 and sold to Comarket Inc. on 29 February 1960 for scrapping. Marcus Island received four battle stars and a Navy Unit Commendation for her World War II service.

== Squadron history ==
Operation	Embarked Squadron	Fighters	Torpedo bombers	Recon planes	Total
Battle of Peleliu	Composite Squadron (VC) 21	16 FM-2	12 TBM-1C		28
Battle of Leyte		17 FM-2	12 TBM-1C		29
Battle of Mindoro		24 FM-2	9 TBM-1C		33
Invasion of Lingayen Gulf		26 FM-2	9 TBM-1C		35
Battle of Okinawa	Composite Squadron (VC) 87	20 FM-2	11 TBM-3	1 TBM-3P	32

== Sources ==
=== Online sources ===
- "Cost of War-Built Vessels From Inception, From October 25, 1936 to June 30, 1946" (PDF). United States Maritime Commission. Archived from the original (PDF) on 18 February 2026.
- Evans, Robert L.; Palmer, Fitzhugh L. (August 1976). "'Pictorial—Cinderella Carriers'". Proceedings. 102 (8).
- Hackett, Bob; Kingsepp, Sander (2020). "The TA Operations to Leyte, Part 1". combinedfleet.com.
- "Marcus Island (CVE-77)". Dictionary of American Naval Fighting Ships. Naval History and Heritage Command. 27 April 2016. Archived from the original on 14 November 2021.
- Priolo, Gary P. (2024). "Escort Carrier Photo Archive USS MARCUS ISLAND (CVE-77)". NavSource Naval History.

=== Books ===
- Adcock, Al (1996), Escort Carriers in Action - Warships No. 9, Carrollton, Texas: Squadron/Signal Publications, ISBN 9780897473569
- Cutler, Thomas J. (2014), Battle of Leyte Gulf: 23-26 October 1944, Annapolis, Maryland: Naval Institute Press, ISBN 9781557502438
- Decorations, Medals, Ribbons, Badges of the United States Navy, Marine Corps and Coast Guard 1861–1948, NAVPERS 15790, Washington, D.C.: Bureau of Naval Personnel, 1948, OCLC 2504188
- Friedman, Norman (1980), "United States of America", in Chesneau, Roger; Gardiner, Robert (eds.), Conway's All the World's Fighting Ships 1922–1946, London, England: Conway Maritime Press, ISBN 0870219138
- Friedman, Norman (1983), U.S. Aircraft Carriers: An Illustrated Design History, Annapolis, Maryland: Naval Institute Press, ISBN 9780870217395
- Hornfischer, James D. (2004), The Last Stand of the Tin Can Sailors: The Extraordinary World War II Story of the U.S. Navy's Finest Hour, New York City, New York: Bantam Books, ISBN 9781616372774
- Hoyt, Edwin P. (1972), The Battle of Leyte Gulf: The Death Knell of the Japanese Fleet, New York City, New York: Weybright & Talley, ISBN 9780515092301
- Lundgren, Robert (2014), The World Wonder'd: What Really Happened Off Samar, Ann Arbor, Michigan: Nimble Books, ISBN 9781608880461
- Ross, Al (1993), The Escort Carrier Gambier Bay, Anatomy of the Ship, London, England: Conway Maritime Press, ISBN 9781557502353
- Y'Blood, William T. (2012), The Little Giants: U.S. Escort Carriers Against Japan, Annapolis, Maryland: Naval Institute Press, ISBN 9781612512471

=== Military documents ===
- "ACA Form Reps Nos 5-15-Rep of Air Ops In Support of the Invasion of Leyte Is, Philippines, 10/24-29/44 Including Attacks on Jap Fleet on 10/25 & 26/44". 1944 – via Fold3.
- "Rep of Air Ops in Support of the Occupation of Leyte Is, Philippines, 10/12-29/44, Including Act Against Jap Fleet". 1944 – via Fold3.
- "War History, Composite Squadron Twenty-One 10/30/43 to 1/31/45". United States Navy. 1945 – via Fold3.
- "War History, Marcus Island, 12/16/43 to 9/30/45". United States Navy. 1945 – via Fold3.
