= USS Eichenberger =

Buckley-class destroyer escort

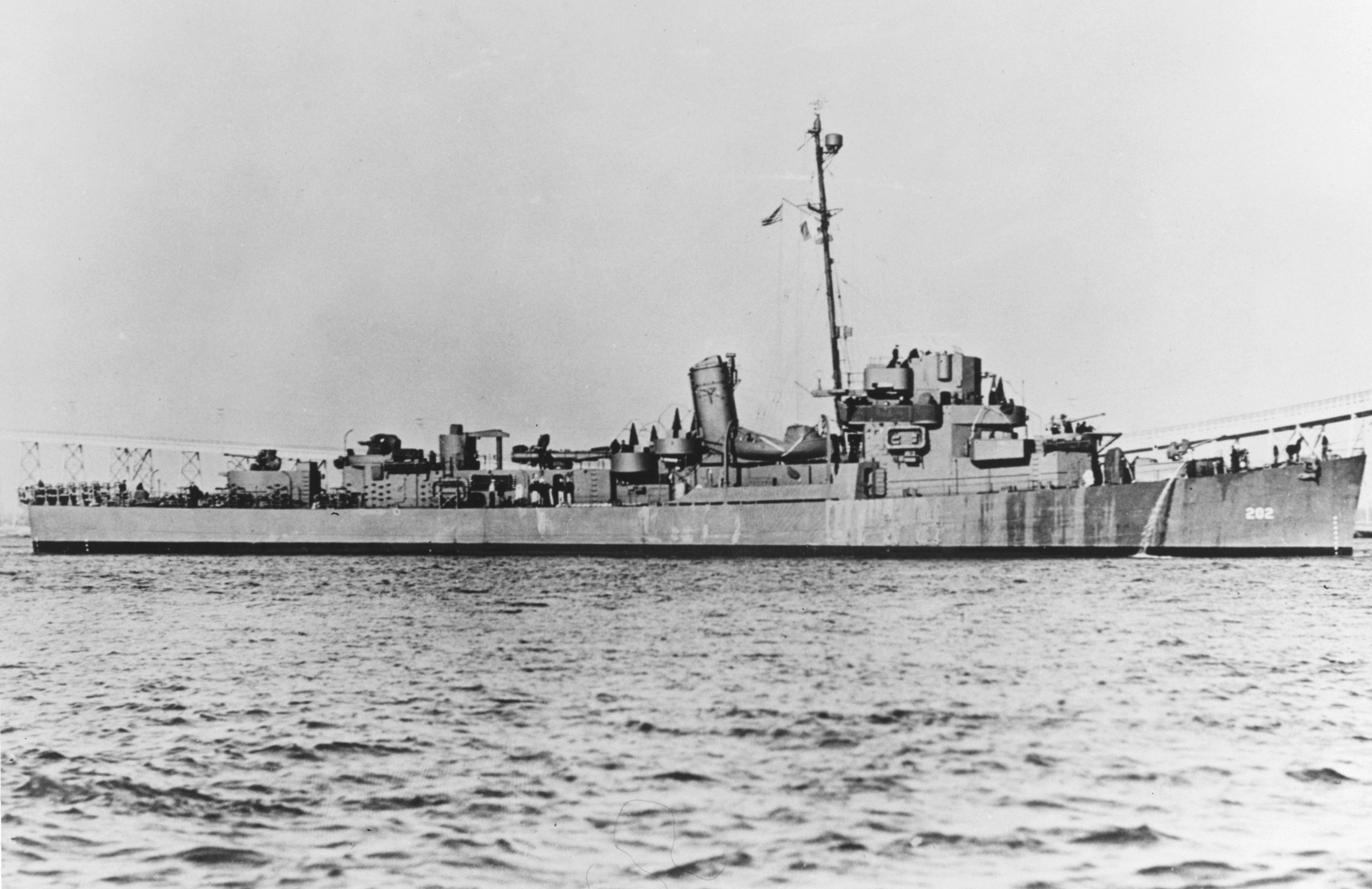

History

United States
- Name: USS Eichenberger
- Namesake: Charles Emil Eichenberger Jr.
- Ordered: 1942
- Builder: Charleston Navy Yard, North Charleston, South Carolina
- Laid down: 15 April 1943
- Launched: 22 July 1943
- Commissioned: 17 November 1943
- Decommissioned: 16 May 1946
- Stricken: 1 December 1972
- Honors and awards: 4 battle stars (World War II)
- Fate: Sold for scrap, 1 November 1973

General characteristics
- Class & type: Buckley-class destroyer escort
- Displacement: 1,400 long tons (1,422 t) light; 1,740 long tons (1,768 t) standard
- Length: 306 ft (93 m)
- Beam: 37 ft (11 m)
- Draft: 9 ft 6 in (2.90 m) standard; 11 ft 3 in (3.43 m) full load
- Propulsion: 2 × boilers; General Electric turbo-electric drive; 12,000 shp (8.9 MW); 2 × solid manganese-bronze 3,600 lb (1,600 kg) 3-bladed propellers, 8 ft 6 in (2.59 m) diameter, 7 ft 7 in (2.31 m) pitch; 2 × rudders; 359 tons fuel oil
- Speed: 23 knots (43 km/h; 26 mph)
- Range: 3,700 nmi (6,900 km) at 15 kn (28 km/h; 17 mph); 6,000 nmi (11,000 km) at 12 kn (22 km/h; 14 mph)
- Complement: 15 officers, 198 men
- Armament: 3 × 3-inch/50-caliber guns; 1 × quad 1.1-inch/75-caliber gun; 8 × single 20 mm guns; 1 × triple 21 inch (533 mm) torpedo tubes; 1 × Hedgehog anti-submarine mortar; 8 × K-gun depth charge projectors; 2 × depth charge tracks

USS Eichenberger (DE-202), a Buckley-class destroyer escort of the United States Navy, was named in honor of Ensign Charles Emil Eichenberger Jr. (1920–1942), who was killed in aerial combat on 12 September 1942 during the attack on the Solomon Islands.

Eichenberger was launched on 22 July 1943 by Charleston Navy Yard, sponsored by Ensign Eichenberger's widow, and commissioned on 17 November 1943.

== Service history ==
Eichenberger departed Norfolk, Virginia on 26 January 1944, escorting a convoy to Espiritu Santo and a fueling group to rendezvous with the 5th Fleet before reporting to Milne Bay on 7 April for escort, patrol, and reconnaissance supporting the forces invading New Guinea. She saw action in the landings at Biak and Humboldt Bay, and the initial landings at Wakde during May and June, and escorted convoys from Manus.

After patrolling the Palaus from 20 October to 9 November 1944, Eichenberger sailed from Hollandia on 22 November with the first of two convoys to San Pedro Bay, Leyte. On 4 January 1945, she was bound for Mindoro when the escort carrier Ommaney Bay was bombed and destroyed by a Japanese kamikaze aircraft. The escort vessel rescued two survivors and left a whaleboat and rescue party for the damaged carrier while she continued on with her task group. Returning, she found two of her men had been killed by debris launched from torpedoes detonating within the burning carrier. Several of Ommaney Bay's men had been picked up from the water by the whaleboat. Eichenberger patrolled Mangarin Bay during support landings on Mindoro and escorted two supply convoys from Subic Bay to Mindoro, then returned to San Pedro Bay, Leyte, on 24 February.

Eichenberger served in the Philippines for the remainder of the war on local escort and patrol duty operating primarily out of Subic Bay. She sailed for Okinawa on 27 August and herded a convoy safely through a typhoon, arriving on 8 September. After a similar voyage, during which she rescued six men from a downed aircraft, Eichenberger returned to the Philippines to embark servicemen eligible for discharge, with whom she arrived at San Diego on 23 October 1945. She was placed out of commission, in reserve, there on 14 May 1946.

== Awards ==
Eichenberger received four battle stars for World War II service.
