= Kadashan Bay =

Bay in Alaska, United States

Coordinates: 57°43′36″N 135°13′24″W

Kadashan Bay is located on Chichagof Island on the south side of Tenakee Inlet. It is named after Paul K. Kadashan, a Tlingit native who applied for a homestead in the area in 1915. The escort carrier USS Kadashan Bay was named after it.
