= Clarence Ekstrom =

United States Navy vice admiral

Clarence Eugene Ekstrom
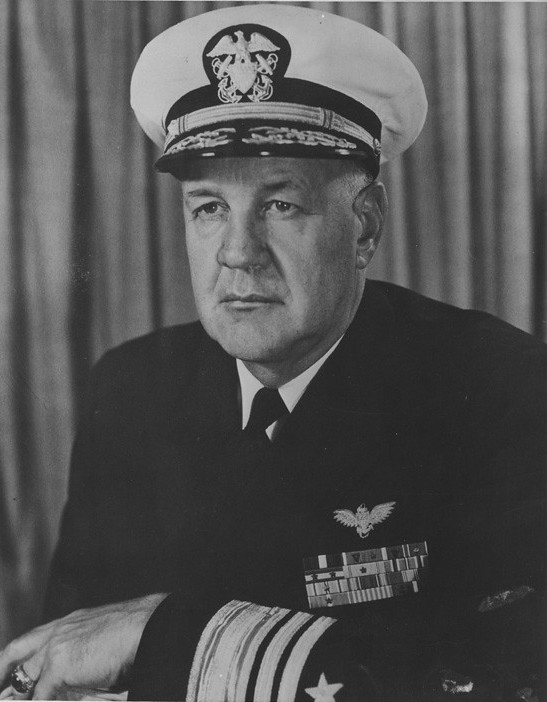
- Born: March 10, 1902; Waupaca, Wisconsin
- Died: January 11, 1986 (aged 83)
- Military career
- Allegiance: United States
- Branch: United States Navy
- Service years: 1924–1962
- Rank: Vice Admiral
- Nickname: Swede
- Commands: USS Savo Island; USS Franklin D. Roosevelt; United States Sixth Fleet; Commander Naval Air Force Pacific Fleet
- Conflicts: World War II
- Awards: Navy Cross

Clarence Eugene Ekstrom (March 10, 1902 – January 11, 1986) was a naval aviator and vice admiral in the United States Navy, who served during World War II.

== Biography ==
Ekstrom was born in Waupaca, Wisconsin, and graduated from the United States Naval Academy in 1924.

In November 1940 Lieutenant Commander Ekstrom was the commanding officer of reconnaissance squadron VCS-9.

While a captain, Ekstrom was awarded the Navy Cross for his actions during the Battle of Leyte Gulf while commanding the escort carrier USS Savo Island. His award citation reads:

The President of the United States of America takes pleasure in presenting the Navy Cross to Captain Clarence Eugene Ekstrom, United States Navy, for extraordinary heroism and distinguished service in the line of his profession as Commanding Officer of the Escort Carrier USS Savo Island (CVE-78), in a surface engagement with a large task force of the Japanese Fleet near the Island of Samar in Philippine waters during the Battle of Leyte Gulf on 25 October 1944. Captain Ekstrom handled his ship at all times in a highly expert and seamanlike manner. By his courage, skill in combat, and determination, he gave encouragement to his officers and men and to his air personnel in a manner that caused his action to be largely instrumental in the defeat of the Japanese task force. Captain Ekstrom's inspiring leadership and the valiant devotion to duty of his command contributed in large measure to the outstanding success of these vital missions and reflect great credit upon the United States Naval Service.

From 11 July 1949 to 27 July 1950 Captain Ekstrom commanded the aircraft carrier USS Franklin D. Roosevelt.

Rear Admiral Ekstrom was awarded the 1954 William J. Kossler Award, for the greatest achievement in the practical application or operation of a vertical flight aircraft that year.

In the late 1950s Ekstrom commanded Sixth Fleet in the Mediterranean Sea.

He served as Commander, Naval Air Forces, Pacific Fleet, (COMNAVAIRPAC) with the rank of vice admiral from 12 October 1959 until 30 November 1962.

Vice Admiral Ekstrom retired in 1962 and settled in Coronado, California. He died on 11 January 1986.

== Personal life ==
Ekstrom married Elizabeth "Betty" Lobdell (1912–2006) in Seattle on 24 May 1939. They had two children, Martha and John, and four grandchildren, Dasho, Djuna, Cascade and Kalyn.
