= USS Savo Island =

Casablanca-class escort carrier of the US Navy

- USS Savo Island (CVE-78) underway in May 1944, location unknown. Note the dismantled SO3C Seamew, a J2F Duck (minus its engine), an SOC Seagull, and three F6F Hellcats lining the port side, with spare floats lashed down aft.

History

United States
- Name: Kaita Bay; Savo Island
- Namesake: Kaita Bay, Territory of Alaska; Battle of Savo Island
- Ordered: as a Type S4-S2-BB3 hull, MCE hull 1115
- Awarded: 18 June 1942
- Builder: Kaiser Shipyards
- Laid down: 27 September 1943
- Launched: 22 December 1943
- Commissioned: 3 February 1944
- Decommissioned: 12 December 1946
- Stricken: 8 May 1946
- Identification: Hull symbol: CVE-78
- Honors and awards: 4 Battle stars, a Presidential Unit Citation for service throughout the Philippines campaign
- Fate: Sold for scrap, 29 February 1960

General characteristics
- Class & type: Casablanca-class escort carrier
- Displacement: 8,188 long tons (8,319 t) (standard); 10,902 long tons (11,077 t) (full load)
- Length: 512 ft 3 in (156.13 m) (oa); 490 ft (150 m) (wl); 474 ft (144 m) (fd)
- Beam: 65 ft 2 in (19.86 m); 108 ft (33 m) (extreme width)
- Draft: 20 ft 9 in (6.32 m) (max)
- Installed power: 4 × Babcock & Wilcox boilers; 9,000 shp (6,700 kW)
- Propulsion: 2 × Skinner Unaflow reciprocating steam engines; 2 × screws
- Speed: 19 knots (35 km/h; 22 mph)
- Range: 10,240 nmi (18,960 km; 11,780 mi) at 15 kn (28 km/h; 17 mph)
- Complement: Total: 910 – 916 officers and men; Embarked Squadron: 50 – 56; Ship's Crew: 860
- Armament: As designed: 1 × 5 in (127 mm)/38 cal dual-purpose gun; 4 × twin 40 mm (1.57 in) Bofors anti-aircraft guns; 12 × 20 mm (0.79 in) Oerlikon anti-aircraft cannons; Varied, ultimate armament: 1 × 5 in (127 mm)/38 cal dual-purpose gun; 8 × twin 40 mm (1.57 in) Bofors anti-aircraft guns; 20 × 20 mm (0.79 in) Oerlikon anti-aircraft cannons
- Aircraft carried: 27
- Aviation facilities: 1 × catapult; 2 × elevators

Service record
- Part of: United States Pacific Fleet (1944–1946); Atlantic Reserve Fleet (1946–1959)
- Operations: Mariana and Palau Islands campaign; Battle off Samar; Battle of Mindoro; Battle of Lingayen Gulf; Battle of Okinawa; Operation Magic Carpet

USS Savo Island (CVE-78) was the twenty-fourth of fifty Casablanca-class escort carriers built for the United States Navy during World War II. She was named to memorialize the U.S. casualties of the Battle of Savo Island, which was fought as part of the Guadalcanal campaign. The ship was launched in December 1943, commissioned in February 1944, and served as a frontline carrier throughout the Mariana and Palau Islands campaign and the Philippines campaign. During the Battle of Okinawa, she provided air cover for the replenishment carrier fleet. Postwar, she participated in Operation Magic Carpet, repatriating U.S. servicemen from throughout the Pacific. She was decommissioned in December 1946, when she was mothballed in the Atlantic Reserve Fleet. Ultimately, she was sold for scrapping in February 1960.

== Design and description ==
A side profile of the design of Thetis Bay.

Savo Island was a Casablanca-class escort carrier, the most numerous type of aircraft carriers ever built. Built to stem heavy losses during the Battle of the Atlantic, they came into service in late 1943, by which time the U-boat threat was already in retreat. Although some did see service in the Atlantic, the majority were utilized in the Pacific, ferrying aircraft, providing logistics support, and conducting close air support for the island-hopping campaigns. The Casablanca-class carriers were built on the standardized Type S4-S2-BB3 hull, a lengthened variant of the Doyen-class hull, and specifically designed to be mass-produced using welded prefabricated sections. This allowed them to be produced at unprecedented speeds: the final ship of her class, Munda, was delivered to the Navy just 101 days after the laying of her keel.

Savo Island was 512 ft 3 in (156.13 m) long overall (490 ft (150 m) at the waterline), had a beam of 65 ft 2 in (19.86 m), and a draft of 20 ft 9 in (6.32 m). She displaced 8,188 long tons (8,319 t) standard, which increased to 10,902 long tons (11,077 t) with a full load. To carry out flight operations, the ship had a 257 ft (78 m) hangar deck and a 474 ft (144 m) flight deck. Her compact size necessitated the installation of an aircraft catapult at her bow, and there were two aircraft elevators to facilitate movement of aircraft between the flight and hangar deck: one each fore and aft.

She was powered by four Babcock & Wilcox Express D boilers that raised 285 psi (1,970 kPa) of steam at 577 °F (303 °C). The steam generated by these boilers fed two Skinner Unaflow reciprocating steam engines, delivering 9,000 hp (6,700 kW) to two propeller shafts. This allowed her to reach speeds of 19 kn (35 km/h; 22 mph), with a cruising range of 10,240 nmi (18,960 km; 11,780 mi) at 15 kn (28 km/h; 17 mph). For armament, one 5 in (127 mm)/38 caliber dual-purpose gun was mounted on the stern. Additional anti-aircraft defense was provided by eight Bofors 40 mm (1.57 in) anti-aircraft guns in single mounts and twelve Oerlikon 20 mm (0.79 in) cannons mounted around the perimeter of the deck. By 1945, Casablanca-class carriers had been modified to carry twenty Oerlikon cannons and sixteen Bofors guns; the doubling of the latter was accomplished by putting them into twin mounts. Sensors onboard consisted of a SG surface-search radar and a SK air-search radar.

Although Casablanca-class escort carriers were intended to function with a crew of 860 and an embarked squadron of 50 to 56, the exigencies of wartime often necessitated the inflation of the crew count. They were designed to operate with 27 aircraft, but the hangar deck could accommodate much more during transport or training missions.

During the Mariana and Palau Islands campaign, she carried 16 FM-2 fighters, and 12 TBM-1C torpedo bombers, for a total of 28 aircraft. During the Battle off Samar, she carried 17 FM-2 fighters and 12 TBM-1C torpedo bombers, for a total of 29 aircraft. During the Battle of Mindoro, she carried 24 FM-2 fighters and 9 TBM-1C torpedo bombers, for a total of 33 aircraft. During the Battle of Lingayen Gulf, she carried 19 FM-2 fighters and 12 TBM-1C torpedo bombers, for a total of 31 aircraft. During the Battle of Okinawa, she carried 20 FM-2 fighters and 12 TBM-3 torpedo bombers, for a total of 32 aircraft.

== Construction ==
Her construction was awarded to Kaiser Shipbuilding Company, Vancouver, Washington under a Maritime Commission contract, on 18 June 1942. The escort carrier was laid down on 27 September 1943 under the name Kaita Bay, as part of a tradition which named escort carriers after bays or sounds in Alaska. She was laid down as MC hull 1115, the twenty-fourth of a series of fifty Casablanca-class escort carriers. She was renamed Savo Island on 6 November 1943, as part of a new naval policy which named subsequent Casablanca-class carriers after naval or land engagements. She was launched on 22 December 1943; sponsored by Miss Margaret Taffinder; transferred to the United States Navy and commissioned on 3 February 1944, with Captain Clarence Eugene Ekstrom in command.

== Service history ==
Upon being commissioned, Savo Island underwent a shakedown cruise down the West Coast to San Diego, where she took on a load of replacement aircraft. Between 15 March 1944 and 2 July, she underwent two transport missions, ferrying aircraft to bases in the Southwest Pacific. On 6 July, she embarked Composite Squadron (VC) 27, which would be her aircraft contingent throughout the Marianas and Palau Islands campaign and the Philippines campaign of 1944–45. After a brief period of training off the waters of San Diego, she sailed west to Pearl Harbor, where similar exercises were conducted. There, on 4 August, she was assigned to Task Group 32.7, the Western Escort Carrier Group, commanded by Rear Admiral William Sample, of the Third Fleet, assigned to support the planned landings on the island of Peleliu, in the Palau Islands. Her aircraft contingent began combat operations on 11 September, strafing and bombarding the island to soften up the defenses for the landings. Following the landing of marines, her aircraft transitioned into providing close air support and patrol missions, up until 30 September.

On 3 October, she was assigned to and joined Task Group 77.4, which was gathering at Manus Island, in the Admiralty Islands, as part of the Seventh Fleet. She, accompanied by eighteen other escort carriers and their screens of battleships, cruisers, and destroyers, steamed on 12 October for Leyte Gulf, where they were expected to support the landings on Leyte, which marked the beginning of the Philippines campaign. As a part of Task Unit 77.4.2, otherwise known as "Taffy 2", commanded by Rear Admiral Felix Stump, she was positioned to the direct south of "Taffy 3", which was located to the direct east of the San Bernardino Strait. Arriving off the island on 18 October, her aircraft began carrying out naval patrols and strikes against predesignated targets. Once the Sixth Army had landed on 20 October, her aircraft transitioned towards a focus on close air support, supporting the initial advances for the next few days.

On 23 October, the Battle of Leyte Gulf began. Almost the entirety of Japan's remaining surface fleet had been concentrated into a counterattack against the U.S. forces in the vicinity of the Philippines, which had threatened to cut off Japan's vital oil supply from Southeast Asia. Split into three groups, the Southern Force was defeated in the Battle of Surigao Strait, whilst Vice Admiral William Halsey Jr. sent the Third Fleet in an attack against the diversionary Northern Force. Therefore, the escort carriers which continued providing ground support had no capital ship screening, even as Vice Admiral Takeo Kurita's Center Force drove through the San Bernardino Strait during the night. On the early morning of 25 October, the Center Force emerged into the waters of Leyte Gulf, catching Taffy 3, some 20 mi (32 km) north of Savo Island, by surprise.

As the American command came to an understanding of the severity of the situation, with the Center Force consisting of four battleships, six cruisers, and a large destroyer screen, the entirety of Taffy 2's aircraft were recalled to join the defense. Savo Island's fighters and torpedo bombers were not equipped to attack surface ships, with most of her bombers being loaded with incendiary bombs and missiles for ground attacks. Nonetheless, aircraft from Savo Island's VC-27 were amongst Taffy 2's first wave of strikes, launched at 7:37 in the morning. Some of the destroyers within Taffy 2's screen wandered north, before being confronted with some Japanese naval gunfire and being ordered to withdraw towards the escort carriers. Overall, Savo Island launched six strikes against the Japanese forces, with her aircraft notably landing a torpedo hit on a Japanese battleship and shooting down an Aichi E13A reconnaissance seaplane caught in the middle of the action.

Discouraged by the stiff resistance his Center Force had faced, including the loss of three cruisers, Kurita issued orders to withdraw in the late morning, sparing Taffy 3 from further destruction. As the Japanese forces withdrew, fighters from Savo Island took the opportunity to down four more Japanese planes. Nonetheless, the escort carriers underwent concentrated Japanese attack again in the afternoon, this time from the air, including some of the first usage of kamikaze suicide attacks. The carrier continued supporting ground operations until 30 October, when Taffy 2 was reorganized into Task Unit 77.4.4, and ordered to withdraw back to Manus Island to rearm and replenish. She sortied from Manus on 19 November, providing cover for convoys proceeding to Leyte Gulf from 22 November to 27 November, accompanied by two other escort carriers. Upon completing this task, she replenished at Kossol Roads, Palau, before she left on 10 December, this time in support of the landings on the island of Mindoro. Her aircraft provided air cover as the landing craft unloaded their troops, and provided close air support as they advanced. They also targeted air fields, from which kamikaze aircraft were beginning to make regular forays. The escort carriers were relieved by Army aircraft on 15 December, but she stayed offshore until 17 December because of indications of a Japanese surface raid, which never materialized. On 17 December, she steamed back to Manus Island.

Savo Island underway in the Sulu Sea, photographed from the battleship West Virginia.

At Manus Island, Savo Island was assigned to Task Unit 77.4.2., the San Fabian Carrier Group. On 27 December, the carriers, escorted by a large surface fleet, left Manus bound for Lingayen Gulf, to the west of Luzon. There, the carriers would support the 6th Army landings on Luzon. As a part of Task Unit 77.4.2., Savo Island would provide air support and cover for the I Army Corps, which would land around the San Fabian area. Pausing at San Pedro Bay, the carriers entered the Sulu Sea on 3 January 1945, where they began being harried by aircraft, circling around on radar. Japanese planes continued appearing around the periphery of the American forces throughout 4 January, but it was not until 17:00 in the evening that the Japanese forces coalesced into a kamikaze strike, attacking at 17:12, achieving complete surprise, and sinking Savo Island's sister Ommaney Bay.

The following day, on 5 January, the kamikazes returned. At 17:43 in the evening, the battleship New Mexico reported planes approaching from her starboard bow, and shortly afterwards, Savo Island's sister Manila Bay had been hit by two kamikazes, heavily damaging the ship. A few minutes after the attack on Manila Bay, a Nakajima Ki-43 kamikaze dove towards Savo Island. Engaged by several anti-aircraft batteries, the plane began trailing smoke some 800 yd (730 m) away from the carrier. As a reaction, Savo Island turned hard to starboard, whilst its 24 in (610 mm) searchlight was pointed at the aircraft to try to blind the pilot. The plane, moving erratically, passed between the carrier's mast and the whip antenna, shearing off the carrier's radar antenna, before diving into the sea.

On 6 January, the carriers proceeded into Lingayen Gulf, and started a heavy bombardment of Japanese defenses, flying 5,971 sorties in eleven days. On 9 January, the 6th Army moved onshore, encountering little resistance. Savo Island remained on station until 17 January, when the United States Air Force took over air operations on Luzon. She then proceeded south to operate to the northwest of Mindoro, to guard against any counterattacks on the American garrisons situated throughout the Northern Philippines, staying on station from 17 January until 29 January. During this period, on 19 January, Captain William Donald Anderson took command of the ship. Upon completing her patrols, she then provided cover for landings near Subic Bay on 29 and 30 January, before retiring to Ulithi, in the Caroline Islands, for repairs and replenishment. There, her aircraft contingent, Composite Squadron 27, was replaced with Composite Squadron 91, which had previously served upon Savo Island's sister Kitkun Bay. Upon receiving replacement pilots, she began a brief period of training exercises, before being assigned to Task Unit 52.1.1, in preparation for the Battle of Okinawa.

Transiting via Leyte, her aircraft provided air cover and patrols en route. On 26 March, along with two other escort carriers, she supported the 77th Infantry Division as it occupied the Kerama Islands. On 27 March, she began bombing the main island of Okinawa, with her fighters flying antiaircraft and antisubmarine patrols. On 7 April, the carrier left Task Unit 52.1.1., trading places with Shamrock Bay, part of Task Group 50.8, the Logistics Support Group. Therefore, from 7 to 16 April, she screened a replenishment convoy proceeding to the east of Okinawa. Upon the completion of that task, she continued providing close air support for American forces advancing down Okinawa. On 27 April, her aircraft bombed Sakishima Gunto, an island situated halfway between Okinawa and Formosa. On 29 April, Savo Island, along with her sisters Marcus Island and Saginaw Bay, were discharged from their task group, all sailing for overhaul in San Diego. Savo Island's aircraft contingent, Composite Squadron 91, was traded for her sister Makin Island's Composite Squadron (VC) 84.

USS Savo Island (CVE-78) photographed from the waterline, her flight deck full of aircraft, date and location unknown.

After finishing overhaul, Savo Island began a transport mission from San Diego to Pearl Harbor, before transiting back to Alameda, California, on the West Coast. On 6 August, she departed for the Aleutian Islands, arriving on 15 August, right as the Surrender of Japan was announced. On 31 August, she headed, along with six other escort carriers, to support the occupation of Japan in northern Honshū and Hokkaidō. After finishing her duties, she returned to Pearl Harbor on 25 September, where she was assigned to the "Magic Carpet" fleet, which repatriated servicemen from throughout the Pacific. She first loaded occupation troops bound for Japan at San Francisco, before heading west. Savo Island made a total of three "Magic Carpet" voyages, repatriating troops from Guam, Pearl Harbor, and Okinawa, respectively. Upon arriving at Seattle on 14 January 1946, and finishing her final voyage, she transited to the Eastern seaboard, entering Boston Harbor on 16 March for inactivation.

Savo Island was decommissioned on 12 December, and mothballed in the Atlantic Reserve Fleet, as part of its Boston group. Docked at the South Boston Naval Annex, she was reclassified as a helicopter escort carrier (CVHE-78) on 12 June 1955. She was then further reclassified as an aviation transport (AKV-28) on 7 May 1959. She was struck from the Navy list on 1 September 1959, and she was sold on 29 February 1960 to Comarket Inc., which broke her up in Hong Kong throughout June 1960. Savo Island received 4 battle stars for her World War II service. In addition, she received a Presidential Unit Citation for her service in the Western Carolines, the Philippines, and Okinawa from 6 September 1944 to 29 April 1945. Clarence Ekstrom, the carrier's commander during the Battle of Leyte Gulf, later received the Navy Cross for his leadership and courage in the action.

== In popular culture ==
While the Savo Island spent the Korean War in mothballs as part of the Atlantic Reserve Fleet, author James Michener fictionally had it in commission (as an Essex-class fleet carrier) and participating in that war as the primary setting for his novella The Bridges at Toko-ri. The 1954 movie version was filmed aboard the fleet carriers Oriskany and Kearsarge with Oriskany still displaying its hull symbol of CV-34, but the ship was still referred to as the Savo Island.

== Sources ==
=== Online sources ===
- "'Savo Island' (CVE-78)". Dictionary of American Naval Fighting Ships. Naval History and Heritage Command. 27 April 2016. Archived from the original on 2 June 2019. This article incorporates text from this source, which is in the public domain.
- "Kaiser Vancouver, Vancouver WA". www.ShipbuildingHistory.com. 27 November 2010. Archived from the original on 16 June 2019.
- "World Aircraft Carriers List: US Escort Carriers, S4 Hulls". Hazegray.org. 14 December 1998. Archived from the original on 19 November 2021.
- Maksel, Rebecca (14 August 2012). "How Do You Name an Aircraft Carrier?". Air & Space/Smithsonian.
- Stubblebine, Daniel (June 2011). "Escort Carrier Makin Island (CVE-93)". ww2db.com.
- "Navy Cross Recipients, World War II, 1941-1945" (PDF). United States Department of Defense. June 2015. Archived from the original (PDF) on 3 December 2013.

=== Bibliography ===
- Adcock, Al (1996), Escort Carriers in Action - Warships No. 9, Carrollton, Texas: Squadron/Signal Publications, ISBN 9780897473569
- Chesneau, Robert; Gardiner, Robert (1980), Conway's All the World's Fighting Ships 1922–1946, London, England: Naval Institute Press, ISBN 9780870219139
- Friedman, Norman (1983), U.S. Aircraft Carriers: An Illustrated Design History, Annapolis, Maryland: Naval Institute Press, ISBN 9780870217395
- Rielly, Robin (2010), Kamikaze Attacks of World War II: A Complete History of Japanese Suicide Strikes on American Ships, by Aircraft and Other Means, Jefferson, North Carolina: McFarland & Company, ISBN 9780786457724
- Ross, Al (1993), The Escort Carrier Gambier Bay, Anatomy of the Ship, London, England: Conway Maritime Press, ISBN 9781557502353
- Wise, James E.; Rehill, Anne C. (2007), Stars in Blue: Movie Actors in America's Sea Services (E-book), Annapolis, Maryland: Naval Institute Press, ISBN 9781591149446
- Y'Blood, William (2012), The Little Giants: U.S. Escort Carriers Against Japan, Annapolis, Maryland: Naval Institute Press, ISBN 9781612512471
