= USS Ommaney Bay =

Casablanca-class escort carrier of the US Navy

Coordinates: 11°25′N 121°19′E

- Ommaney Bay off Hawaii, July 1944.

History

United States
- Name: Ommaney Bay
- Namesake: Ommaney Bay, Baranof Island, Alaska
- Builder: Kaiser Shipyards
- Laid down: 6 October 1943
- Launched: 29 December 1943
- Commissioned: 11 February 1944
- Identification: Hull symbol: CVE-79
- Honors and awards: 2 Battle stars
- Fate: Struck by kamikaze aircraft and scuttled, 4 January 1945

General characteristics
- Class & type: Casablanca-class escort carrier
- Displacement: 8,188 long tons (8,319 t) (standard); 10,902 long tons (11,077 t) (full load)
- Length: 512 ft 3 in (156.13 m) (oa); 490 ft (150 m) (wl); 474 ft (144 m) (fd)
- Beam: 65 ft 2 in (19.86 m); 108 ft (33 m) (extreme width)
- Draft: 20 ft 9 in (6.32 m) (max)
- Installed power: 4 × Babcock & Wilcox boilers; 9,000 shp (6,700 kW)
- Propulsion: 2 × Skinner Unaflow reciprocating steam engines; 2 × screws
- Speed: 19 knots (35 km/h; 22 mph)
- Range: 10,200 nmi (18,900 km; 11,700 mi) at 15 kn (28 km/h; 17 mph)
- Complement: 860 (ship's crew)
- Sensors & processing systems: 1 × SG radar, 1 × SK radar
- Armament: As designed: 1 × 5 in (127 mm)/38 cal dual-purpose gun; 4 × twin 40 mm (1.57 in) Bofors anti-aircraft guns; 12 × 20 mm (0.79 in) Oerlikon anti-aircraft cannons; Varied, ultimate armament: 1 × 5 in (127 mm)/38 cal dual-purpose gun; 8 × twin 40 mm (1.57 in) Bofors anti-aircraft guns; 20 × 20 mm (0.79 in) Oerlikon anti-aircraft cannons
- Aviation facilities: 1 × catapult; 2 × elevators

USS Ommaney Bay (CVE-79) was a Casablanca-class escort carrier of the United States Navy which served during World War II. Named after a bay at the south end of Baranof Island, Alaska, she was launched in December 1943 and commissioned in February 1944. She spent her early career transporting aircraft, supplies, and military passengers, after which she provided air support for the Palau Islands campaign in September 1944. During the Philippines campaign, she supported the landings on Leyte and Mindoro. Her aircraft participated in the Battle of Leyte Gulf on 25 October, inflicting severe damage that led to the scuttling of the Japanese cruiser Mogami. They then participated in the Battle off Samar, helping to turn back the Japanese Center Force as it attacked Taffy 3 and delivering the coup de grace to the crippled cruiser Chikuma. She received two battle stars for her wartime service.

On 4 January 1945, while transiting the Sulu Sea to support the landings at Lingayen Gulf, Ommaney Bay was struck by a Japanese kamikaze aircraft. The attack engulfed her in flames, forcing the crew to abandon ship. She was subsequently scuttled by the destroyer Burns. Ninety-three members of her crew were killed, along with three sailors from the destroyer escort Eichenberger who were assisting in rescue operations. Her wreck was located in 2019, and the Naval History and Heritage Command confirmed its identity in July 2023.

== Design and description ==
A side profile of the design of her sister ship Thetis Bay

Ommaney Bay was a Casablanca-class escort carrier, the most numerous type of aircraft carrier ever built. They were intended to be used for anti-submarine warfare, coming into service in late 1943, by which time U-boat activity was already in retreat. Some did see service in the Atlantic, but the majority were utilized in the Pacific, ferrying aircraft, providing logistics support, and conducting close air support for the island-hopping campaigns. They were built on the standardized Type S4-S2-BB3 hull, a lengthened variant of the Doyen-class hull, and specifically designed to be mass-produced using welded prefabricated sections. This allowed them to be produced at unprecedented speeds: the final ship of her class, Munda, was delivered to the Navy just 101 days after the laying of her keel.

Ommaney Bay was 512 ft 3 in (156.13 m) long overall and 490 ft (150 m) at the waterline. She had a beam of 65 ft 2 in (19.86 m), and a draft of 20 ft 9 in (6.32 m). She displaced 8,188 long tons (8,319 t) standard, which increased to 10,902 long tons (11,077 t) with a full load. To carry out flight operations, the ship had a 257 ft (78 m) hangar deck and a 474 ft (144 m) flight deck. Her compact size necessitated the installation of an aircraft catapult, positioned at her bow, and there were two aircraft elevators to facilitate movement of aircraft between the flight and hangar decks: one each fore and aft. She had two Skinner Unaflow reciprocating steam engines delivering 9,000 shp (6,700 kW) to two propellers. This allowed her to reach speeds of 19 kn (35 km/h; 22 mph), with a cruising range of 10,200 nmi (18,900 km; 11,700 mi) at 15 kn (28 km/h; 17 mph). Her armament consisted of one 5 in (127 mm)/38 caliber dual-purpose gun, eight Bofors 40 mm (1.57 in) guns in twin mounts, and twelve Oerlikon 20 mm (0.79 in) cannons, supported by an SG surface-search radar and an SK air-search radar. By 1945, the standard armament for the Casablanca-class carriers had grown to twenty Oerlikon cannons and sixteen Bofors guns. In action, the Casablanca-class carriers were intended to function with a crew of 860. A typical embarked squadron consisted of sixteen Wildcat fighters and twelve Avenger torpedo bombers, stowed in the hangar deck between the two elevators.

== History ==
=== Construction and Palau campaign ===
Casablanca-class escort carriers fitting out at Naval Station Tongue Point on 19 February 1944. Ommaney Bay is the middlemost carrier.

Ommaney Bay was laid down on 6 October 1943 as MCE hull 1116, the twenty-fifth of fifty Casablanca-class escort carriers. Her hull was launched on 29 December, sponsored by Mrs P.K. Robottom. She was named after Ommaney Bay, located at the southern tip of Baranof Island, part of the Alexander Archipelago in the Territory of Alaska. The ship was transferred to the Navy and commissioned at 10:00 on 11 February 1944, with Captain Howard Leyland Young in command. Her construction and outfitting cost $7,339,521 (equivalent to $106,485,000 in 2025).

She spent much of February being fitted out at Naval Station Tongue Point in Astoria, Oregon. She conducted sea trials in Puget Sound from 4 to 13 March, before proceeding south on 14 March. She arrived at Naval Air Station Alameda on 17 March, and sailed on 19 March for Brisbane, Australia, carrying passengers, aircraft, and supplies. She arrived in Brisbane on 7 April, left port on 12 April, and arrived in San Diego on 27 April. From 1 to 10 May, she conducted carrier qualification landings, drills and tests, spending the rest of the month moored for alterations and repairs. She sailed for Pearl Harbor on a transport mission on 10 June. She arrived on 16 June, and until August, she trained air groups and squadrons off the Hawaiian coast. From 2–11 August, she embarked Composite Squadron (VC) 75, which was to be her aviation complement for the rest of her career. On 12 August, Ommaney Bay joined the escort carrier formation Task Unit 32.4.6, commanded by Rear Admiral William D. Sample. She then sailed to Tulagi, arriving on 24 August, where rehearsals were made for Operation Stalemate II, the invasion of the Palau Islands.

After the rehearsals were completed on 26 August, Ommaney Bay set off for the Palau Islands. From 11 September until 1 October, Ommaney Bay provided air cover for the fleet and conducted close support strikes for the forces ashore. Her aircraft targeted Japanese anti-aircraft and artillery emplacements, strafed troop formations, and destroyed supply depots. On 18 September, an Avenger torpedo bomber from Ommaney Bay, low on fuel, was the first aircraft to land on Peleliu's airfield.

=== Battle of Leyte Gulf ===
Fleet movements during the Battle of Leyte Gulf

On 2 October, Ommaney Bay sailed to Manus Island to renew her depleted stock of fuel and ammunition. She departed to support the Battle of Leyte on 14 October, arrived off Leyte on 22 October, and joined Rear Admiral Felix Stump's Taffy 2 (TU 77.4.2). From 22 to 24 October, her aircraft attacked anti-aircraft emplacements, pillboxes, bridges, and Japanese positions. During the night of 24–25 October, the escort carriers received reports of the Battle of Surigao Strait, occurring about 100 mi (160 km) to their southwest. In response, some of Ommaney Bay's Avengers were outfitted with torpedoes.

On 25 October, at 01:55, Admiral Thomas C. Kinkaid ordered three searches at daybreak. Rear Admiral Stump received this order at 04:30, and at 05:09, he delegated one of the searches to Ommaney Bay. (Note: "0509: Received the following orders from CTU 77.4.2: Make the following searches for Jap surface ships, 340° 030°, distance 135 miles. Origin, SULUAN ISLAND. Also search MINDANAO SEA, distance 100 miles from SURIGAO STRAITS, COMOTES SEA area. These two areas to be cleared by 0900.") Two searches were planned, one to cover the Camotes Sea, and one to sweep the area from 340° to 033° from Homonhon, to a distance of 135 mi (217 km). Hampered by the darkness and the rain, it was not until 06:58, by which time the first shells were falling around Taffy 3, the northernmost escort carrier group, that a search contingent of five Wildcat fighters and seven Avenger torpedo bombers was finally assembled. If launched expeditiously, the patrol could have intercepted Vice Admiral Takeo Kurita's Center Force, providing some advance warning to the American fleet.

Nonetheless, once Ommaney Bay's search contingent had been launched, orders were received that countermanded the search and vectored them towards the Camotes Sea, where the Japanese had been sighted. Arriving, they found the heavy cruiser Mogami, escorted by the destroyer Akebono. At 09:02, they set upon Mogami, with her Avengers dropping 500 lb (230 kg) semi-armor-piercing (SAP) and GP bombs. Three bombs hit Mogami, setting her forward aviation fuel storage for her floatplanes ablaze, and possibly disabling her sole remaining turbine. (Note: Mogami's action report states that her engine, which had grown too hot and been evacuated at 04:45, had independently failed. Abukuma's report directly attributes the loss of Mogami's engine to the bomb hit.) Dead in the water, and with her forward 8-inch magazines threatening to blow, the order to abandon ship was given, and Mogami was scuttled by Akebono at 12:56.

Meanwhile, earlier that morning, as her aircraft set off for their strike, word was filtering in of the beleaguered Taffy 3 to the north. At 07:08, Admiral Kinkaid ordered Taffy 2 to divert all available aircraft towards the defense. At 08:10, four Avengers took off from Ommaney Bay, each armed with a Mark 13 torpedo. Her pilots made a run against a heavy cruiser, and one of her Avengers, having previously failed to release its torpedo, dropped it against the battleship Kongō, forcing her to make a hard turn away from Taffy 3. At 09:15, she launched an Avenger armed with a Mark 13 torpedo, and at 11:20, she dispatched a flight of three torpedo-carrying Avengers. Both sorties returned with inconclusive results.

At 13:15, four Wildcats and six Avengers were launched from Ommaney Bay to pursue Kurita's fleet. They joined with aircraft from Natoma Bay, assembling into a formation of eight Wildcats and eleven Avengers, setting off at 13:31. Three of her Avengers were armed with the last of her torpedoes, and at 14:00, one of them spotted a blip on their radar. Peeling off, they found the cruiser Chikuma dead in the water, accompanied by the escorting destroyer Nowaki. Diving down to attack, all three torpedoes were planted into the port side of the stationary Chikuma. Within fifteen minutes, Chikuma had capsized. At 15:10, a final strike of two Avengers, each armed with three 500 lb (230 kg) SAP bombs and six HE rockets, was launched, which attacked a damaged Japanese destroyer.

Ommaney Bay launched six strikes that day. As part of Taffy 2, she was also obliged to take in aircraft from other task groups that were either damaged or low on fuel. The task unit had to jettison several aircraft to accommodate them. She remained on station until 30 October, when her task group retired from Leyte Gulf for Manus.

Ommaney Bay anchored at Manus, 22 November 1944. She is preparing to enter the large auxiliary floating drydock USS ABSD-2.

She anchored in Seeadler Harbor on 3 November, beginning a period of availability and replenishment. On 10 November, she witnessed the ammunition ship Mount Hood explode violently 1.5 mi (2.4 km) from her. Even from her distant vantage point, Ommaney Bay was showered with metal fragments, and hit by a tidal wave. On 26 November, she steamed with TU 77.12.7 for Kossol Roads, arriving on 2 December. There, preparations were made for the impending landings on Mindoro, and the task unit sallied out on the morning of 10 December.

=== Battle of Mindoro ===
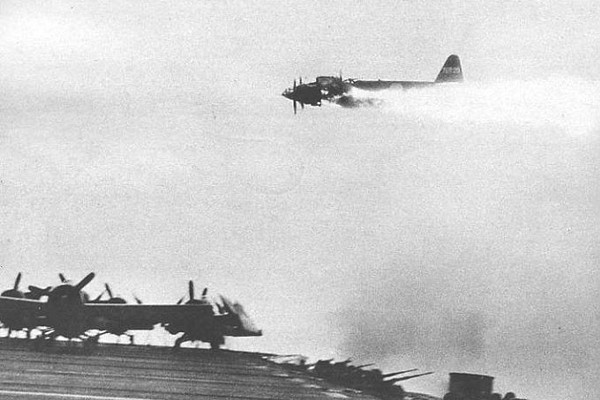
A Yokosuka P1Y kamikaze aircraft passing above Ommaney Bay's flight deck, 15 December 1944.

Ommaney Bay entered the Sulu Sea on 13 December, where they were met with Japanese resistance, with a kamikaze damaging the destroyer Haraden. Over the next few days, her task unit fended off daily attacks by Japanese aircraft. At the same time, Ommaney Bay's air contingent busied themselves with combat air patrols and anti-submarine operations. The largest attack came on 15 December when forty Japanese planes, divided equally between kamikazes and escorts, took off from Clark Field and Davao in the early morning, bound for the battleships and carriers to the east of Mindoro. The first sightings were reported at 07:00, and for the rest of the morning, kamikaze attacks harried the task force. At 09:40, a group of Japanese planes dove towards the escort carriers. One plane missed with its bomb, while two others were shot down by anti-aircraft fire from Manila Bay and the destroyer escorts. At 09:43, a Yokosuka P1Y twin-engined bomber dove directly towards Ommaney Bay from the port bow. Engaged by heavy anti-aircraft fire from the entire task force, the plane was set ablaze about 400 yd (370 m) away and passed 30 yd (27 m) over the flight deck, crashing into the ocean 400 yd (370 m) to her starboard quarter. She concluded operations on 17 December, anchoring at Manus on 23 December. On 27 December, she departed for the Philippines in support of the planned 6th Army landings at Lingayen Gulf. She paused at San Pedro Bay, entering the Sulu Sea on 3 January 1945.

=== Invasion of Lingayen Gulf and loss ===
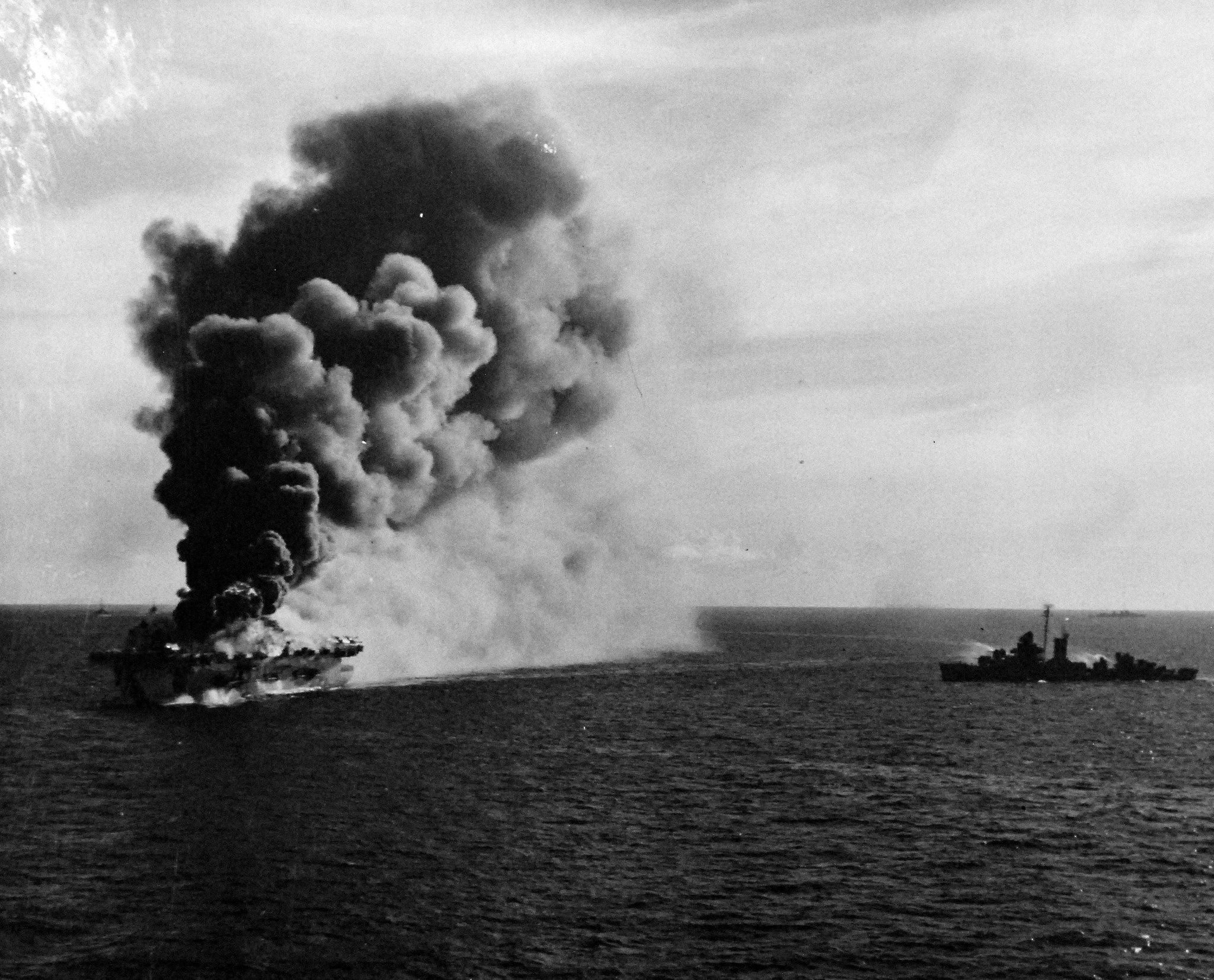
Ommaney Bay engulfed in smoke and flames, a short while after the attack. Photographed from the battleship West Virginia, the destroyer Patterson is shown maneuvering into position to combat the flames

The explosion onboard Ommaney Bay

The aftermath of the explosion

A distant view of the pyrocumulus cloud erupting from the ship

On the afternoon of 4 January 1945, she was transiting the Sulu Sea, on a heading of 290° at 15 kn (28 km/h; 17 mph), within the rear group of the American convoy, astern of the battleship New Mexico. At 17:00, approximately 15 Japanese planes were picked up on radar, 45 nmi (83 km; 52 mi) west of the task group, and approaching quickly. These planes split into two groups, one group heading towards the rear of the task group, while the other continued on its course towards the center. Although fighters from the carrier group were scrambled, false radar signals hampered their efforts, and the only successful interception was when P-47 Thunderbolt fighters made contact with two Japanese planes, shooting down one. The other plane escaped, and is believed to be the kamikaze which would attack Ommaney Bay. This successful intercept was not reported back to command, nor was the fact that the plane which escaped was being herded towards the carrier group. At 17:12, a Yokosuka P1Y penetrated the screen undetected and made for Ommaney Bay, approaching directly towards the ship's bow. Captain Young later reported that the kamikaze's approach was concealed by the blinding glare of the sun.

The Americans were well aware of the kamikaze threat, and additional lookouts had been positioned around the carrier. At the time of the attack, there were ten air lookouts and one sun lookout on the signal platform, who was equipped with Polaroid sunglasses. However, a lack of radar signals led the task group to believe that the Japanese planes had withdrawn, and the kamikaze attack took the lookouts by complete surprise. Her crew were not at general quarters, with supper in the process of being served. Admiral Kinkaid, reviewing the action report, wrote:

The failure of the OMMANEY BAY's air search radar to pick up the approaching plane after losing contact at forty-five miles indicates that the enemy climbed to high altitude at long range and approached along a node in the radar antenna pattern. At certain angles of elevation and with constant head-on aspect of the aircraft the present air search radar is very insensitive. It is believed that the Japanese are aware of this and are taking advantage of it. Strengthening of the visual lookouts is the best countermeasure until improved radar reaches the fleet.

— Thomas C. Kinkaid

The first indicator of trouble was the sound of ricocheting shells, and looking up, the crew of Ommaney Bay saw a twin-engine bomber at 1,000 ft (300 m) in a 45° dive, approaching from nearly dead ahead. New Mexico was only able to respond with inaccurate anti-aircraft fire, while Ommaney Bay was unable to react at all. Seconds later, the kamikaze made impact, first passing a few feet above the open bridge, where the command staff of Ommaney Bay was present, tearing off part of the superstructure with its wing, and collapsing it onto the flight deck. It then veered into her flight deck on the forward starboard side. According to the ship's damage report, two bombs were released; one of them penetrated the flight deck and detonated below, setting off a series of explosions among the fully gassed planes on the forward third of the hangar deck, near the No. 1 boiler uptakes, while the second bomb passed through the hangar deck, damaged the fire main on the second deck, and exploded below decks on the starboard side.

As a result of the earlier strafing, gasoline had already been leaking from the planes, and in conjunction with the exploding bomb and an Avenger torpedo bomber that had been hit by the kamikaze's wreckage, a conflagration was sparked which enveloped the aft of Ommaney Bay's flight deck. In addition, loose ammunition within a clipping room immediately began cooking off. Water pressure forward, power, bridge communications, and steering control were lost immediately. The forward fire main was ruptured, and the forward boilers were disabled. An oil tank may have been breached, contributing to the fire, as the smoke was noted as looking "oily". The effect of this was that the forward and aft halves of the ship were immediately cut off from contact with each other. Some of the ships surrounding Ommaney Bay, having missed the kamikaze, initially believed that the explosion was the result of an accident.

An analysis conducted by the Bureau of Ships in 1948 cast doubt on the ship's report of a second bomb exploding deep inside the hull. It notes that such an explosion would have probably caused flooding or damaged the gasoline tanks, but neither was reported, and the ship developed no list or increase in draft prior to the torpedoes cooking off. The analysis posited that only one large bomb may have detonated, near the uptakes of the No. 1 boiler, at or slightly below the hangar deck, igniting the hangar deck fire. It also suggested that oil observed below decks could have come from damaged aircraft, servicing drums, or an arresting gear in the hangar.

Men struggling with the blazes in the hangar deck soon had to abandon it because of the heavy black smoke from the burning planes and exploding .50 caliber ammunition. Although lighting was restored in the aft of the ship within two minutes of the attack, the damage control parties were unable to establish a consistent water supply. Dense smoke entered the after engine room, forcing its evacuation and the shutdown of its boilers at 17:36. Destroyer escorts found it difficult to assist Ommaney Bay because of the intense heat, the ammunition going off, and the real possibility of a catastrophic detonation, as there were nine torpedoes stowed within the hangar deck. At 17:40, the destroyer Bell, attempting to maneuver into a position to fight the fires, collided with the carrier, damaging her port bridge wing. At 17:45, a gunnery officer gave the order to abandon ship from the aft section, and at 17:50, Captain Young gave the order to abandon ship from the forward section, with both orders passed around by word of mouth. Captain Young was the last man to evacuate the burning wreck at 18:12. At 18:18, the torpedoes stored in the aft end of the ship finally detonated, collapsing the flight deck and launching debris onto the destroyers that were rescuing survivors. At the time of the explosion, there were five men working to rescue survivors from Eichenberger's motor whaleboat, of which one man was struck and killed by debris, while two more were critically injured. Both of the critically injured patients would succumb to their wounds, one later that day, while the other was transferred to the battleship Mississippi and died the following day.

The 1948 report argues that Ommaney Bay's initial damage was very much survivable, given ideal circumstances. The Casablanca-class carriers had two separate fire main loops, forward and aft, each powered by its own pump. What had ultimately doomed the ship was the detonation of the torpedoes within the hangar deck, all stored in the aft, which still had an intact fire main loop. At 17:15, in response to a report that the forward section did not have water pressure, an officer, unaware of the ruptured forward fire main, had opened the connecting valve between the two loops, and then abandoned it to smoke. Now, with the after section connected to the damaged forward loop, water pressure could not be maintained, and the aft hangar sprinklers and water curtains failed. Even at this late juncture, it would have been possible to isolate the connecting valve by closing a set of valves in adjoining, undamaged compartments, which would allow for two pumps in the after engine room to restore water supply to the aft hangar deck. Once that had been accomplished, firefighting parties could have been assembled to mount a defense of the aft.

The report states that the decisive factor was that Ommaney Bay was not at general quarters at the time of the attack, having been caught by complete surprise. The blaze, bisecting the carrier in half, prevented much of her crew from reaching battle stations, the natural assembly point for the organization of firefighting parties. Compounded with the severing of communications from fore and aft, any effective damage control response was precluded. The report contrasts Ommaney Bay's loss to the similar damage dealt by a kamikaze to her sister Manila Bay a day later, which was at general quarters. Within fourteen minutes, the blaze within Manila Bay's forward hangar deck had been brought under control, and she was able to remain on station.

At 19:40, Admiral Jesse B. Oldendorf gave orders for Ommaney Bay to be scuttled, and at 19:58, she was struck by a torpedo from the destroyer Burns. The torpedo broke Ommaney Bay in two amidships. The after half sank immediately, while the forward half remained afloat for a few minutes. The loss of the carrier and the effort to retrieve survivors put her task unit behind schedule, although the tempo was regained later. A total of 93 Navy men from Ommaney Bay were killed, and 65 men were wounded. On 6 and 9 January, Columbia was struck by kamikazes, killing seven survivors rescued from Ommaney Bay. As a replacement for the sunken carrier, Shamrock Bay was dispatched to support the landing on Lingayen Gulf. Ommaney Bay received two battle stars for her World War II service.

== Discovery of wreck ==
In 2019, the wreck site of Ommaney Bay was located by the research vessel Petrel, but an initial survey was unable to conclusively identify the ship. Two years later, the Australian company Sea Scan Survey also found the site, and in Spring 2023, a group of technical divers chartered the company's boat to record video of the wreckage. The divers sent their images and video to NHHC for examination, and working off of Petrel's location data, the Sea Scan survey, and the collected footage, the Naval History and Heritage Command was able to confirm the wreckage as belonging to Ommaney Bay on 10 July 2023. Her inverted wreck is 400 ft (120 m) underwater in the Sulu Sea, and is still periodically leaking fuel. The wreck has been designated as a war grave, and as such, is still considered as sovereign property of the United States.

== Squadron history ==
| Operation | Embarked Squadron | Fighters | Torpedo bombers | Recon planes | Total |
|---|---|---|---|---|---|
| Battle of Peleliu | Composite Squadron (VC) 75 | 16 FM-2 Wildcats | 11 TBM-1C Avengers | | 27 |
| Battle of Leyte | | 16 FM-2 | 11 TBM-1C | | 27 |
| Battle of Mindoro | | 24 FM-2 | 9 TBM-1C | | 33 |
| Invasion of Lingayen Gulf | | 19 FM-2 | 10 TBM-1C, 1 TBM-3 | 1 TBM-1CP | 31 |

== See also ==
- List of U.S. Navy losses in World War II

== Sources ==
=== Online sources ===
- "Combined Fleet – tabular history of Mogami". Bob Hackett & Sander Kingsepp. 2019.
- "Cost of War-Built Vessels From Inception, From October 25, 1936 to June 30, 1946" (PDF). United States Maritime Commission.
- Priolo, Gary P. (12 November 2018). "NavSource Online: Escort Carrier Photo Archive – USS OMMANEY BAY (CVE-79) Commanding Officers". NavSource Naval History.
- "Ommaney Bay", Geographic Names Information System, United States Geological Survey, United States Department of the Interior
- "Ommaney Bay (CVE-79)". Dictionary of American Naval Fighting Ships. Naval History and Heritage Command. 17 August 2015. Archived from the original on 2 June 2019. This article incorporates text from this source, which is in the public domain.
- Price, Jay (31 July 2023). "78 years after Joe Cooper survived a kamikaze attack, the Navy has identified his ship's wreckage". WUNC News.
- "Research vessel Petrel on a roll with historical shipwreck finds". Baird Maritime. 20 November 2019.
- Ruane, Michael (11 July 2023). "Navy identifies wreck of WWII aircraft carrier hit by kamikaze plane". Washington Post. No. 11 July 2023.
- Tully, Anthony P.; Wright, Christopher C.; Tamura, Toshio (2000). "Solving Some Mysteries of Leyte Gulf: Fate of the "Chikuma" and "Chokai"". Warship International. 37 (3): 248–258. JSTOR 44895620.
- "Wreck site identified as World War Two carrier USS Ommaney Bay (CVE 79)". Naval History and Heritage Command. 10 July 2023.

=== Bibliography ===
- Adcock, Al (1996), Escort Carriers in Action - Warships No. 9, Carrollton, Texas: Squadron/Signal Publications, ISBN 9780897473569
- Baker, Arthur D. III (April 2007). "'Jeeps for the Fleet'". Naval History. 21 (2).
- Bureau of Ships (1948), "Section IV: U.S.S. Ommaney Bay (CVE 79) and U.S.S. Manila Bay (CVE 61), Kamikaze Damage, Off Luzon, 4 and 5 January 1945", Escort Carriers: Gunfire, Bomb and Kamikaze Damage and Loss During World War II, United States Navy
- Friedman, Norman (1980), "United States of America", in Chesneau, Roger; Gardiner, Robert (eds.), Conway's All the World's Fighting Ships 1922–1946, London, England: Conway Maritime Press, ISBN 0870219138
- Friedman, Norman (1983), U.S. Aircraft Carriers: An Illustrated Design History, Annapolis, Maryland: Naval Institute Press, ISBN 9780870217395
- Decorations, Medals, Ribbons, Badges of the United States Navy, Marine Corps and Coast Guard 1861–1948, NAVPERS 15790, Washington, D.C.: Bureau of Naval Personnel, 1948, OCLC 2504188
- Lundgren, Robert (2014), The World Wonder'd: What Really Happened Off Samar, Ann Arbor, Michigan: Nimble Books, ISBN 9781608880461
- Rielly, Robin L. (2010), Kamikaze Attacks of World War II: A Complete History of Japanese Suicide Strikes on American Ships, by Aircraft and Other Means, Jefferson, North Carolina: McFarland & Company, ISBN 9780786457724
- Ross, Al (1993), The Escort Carrier Gambier Bay, Anatomy of the Ship, London, England: Conway Maritime Press, ISBN 9781557502353
- Smith, Peter (2014), Kamikaze: To Die for the Emperor, Barnsley, England: Pen and Sword Books, ISBN 9781473847828
- Tully, Anthony P. (2014), Battle of Surigao Strait, Bloomington, Indiana: Indiana University Press, ISBN 9780253009715
- Y'Blood, William (2012), The Little Giants: U.S. Escort Carriers Against Japan, Annapolis, Maryland: Naval Institute Press, ISBN 9781612512471

=== Military documents ===
- "Rep of Air Ops in Support of Landings on Mindoro Is, Philippines, 12/13-17/44". United States Navy – via Fold3.
- "Rep of Air Support Ops for the Capture of Leyte Is, Philippines, 10/14-31/44, Including Act with Jap Fleet, 10/25-26/44". United States Navy – via Fold3.
- "Rep of Ops Against the Palau Is, 9/6/44 - 10/1/44". United States Navy – via Fold3.
- "Report of operations enroute Lingayen Gulf, Luzon Island, Philippines, 1/1-4/45, including enemy suicide crash dive & loss of on 1/4/45". United States Navy – via Fold3.
- "War Diary, USS Ommaney Bay, February 1944". United States Navy – via Fold3.
- "War Diary, USS Ommaney Bay, March–April 1944". United States Navy – via Fold3.
- "War Diary, USS Ommaney Bay, May 1944". United States Navy – via Fold3.
- "War Diary, USS Ommaney Bay, June 1944". United States Navy – via Fold3.
- "War Diary, USS Ommaney Bay, August 1944". United States Navy – via Fold3.
- "War Diary, USS Ommaney Bay, October 1944". United States Navy – via Fold3.
- "War Diary, USS Ommaney Bay, November 1944". United States Navy – via Fold3.
- "War Diary, USS Ommaney Bay, December–January 1945". United States Navy – via Fold3.
- "War History, USS Eichenberger". United States Navy. 17 April 1946 – via Fold3.
