= Naval Station Tongue Point =

Coordinates: 46°12′3.22″N 123°45′52.98″W

Naval Station Tongue Point is a former United States Navy station which was located in Astoria, Oregon.

In 1919, the United States Congress approved the construction of a submarine and destroyer base on Tongue Point, a peninsula jutting into the Columbia River east of Astoria, Oregon. Construction was not started until 1921 and was completed in 1924. However, with the military downsizing following World War I, the base was never used. Prior to World War II, Tongue Point was designated as the site of a Naval Air Station (NAS). Ground breaking took place in 1939 but there were numerous delays until construction was finally completed in 1943. Hangars, an ordnance depot and fuel depot were constructed. PBY Catalina seaplanes then arrived and began coastal patrols. Tongue Point was also the location of the U.S. Naval Ship Yard Tongue Point for pre-commissioning and commissioning escort aircraft carriers built in shipyards in the Portland-Vancouver area. A naval communications intercept station was operational there during World War II.

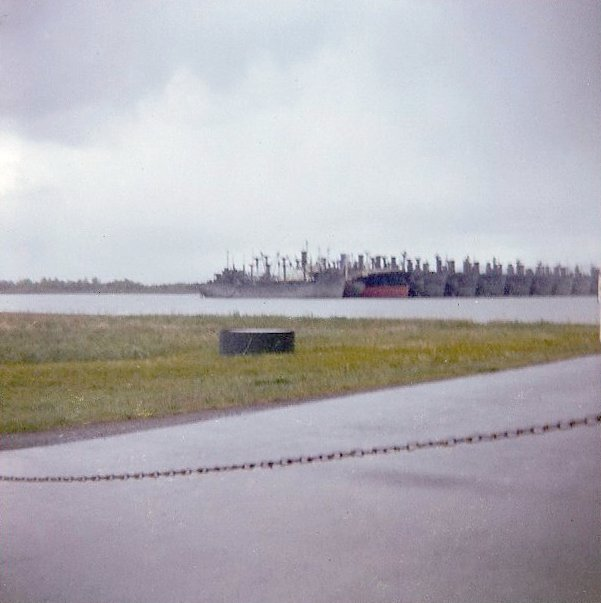
Liberty Ships in mothballs at Tongue Point in 1965

After World War II the air station was deactivated and the base was expanded to include a naval mothball site for the National Defense Reserve Fleet (NRDF), Pacific Reserve Fleet, Astoria (Columbia River Group) which was operated by the predecessors of the United States Maritime Administration (MARAD)

In 1962, the Navy transferred the base to the General Services Administration (GSA). One of the first Job Corps centers in the nation was opened at the site in 1965. Clatsop Community College operates the Marine and Environmental Research and Training Station (MERTS) at Tongue Point.

== U.S. Coast Guard operations ==
In 1876 the Tongue Point Light became operational. In 1939 Tongue Point Coast Guard Station became a buoy tender port. On 14 August 1964 Coast Guard Air Station Astoria was established at Tongue Point Naval Air Station, with a crew of 10 officers and 22 enlisted men. Two Sikorsky HH-52A Seaguard helicopters were assigned to the station. The helicopters operated from that location, staging from the Port of Astoria Airport until the air station was moved to its present location at the Astoria Regional Airport in Warrenton, Oregon on 25 February 1966. The Coast Guard also operated a radio aids to navigation facility at Tongue Point. The U.S. Coast Guard continues to operate an Aids to Navigation (ATON) support and maintenance facility at Tongue Point. In 2022, the Coast Guard awarded a contract to install a fixed pier and two floating docks to accommodate fast response cutters at the base. The first new cutter is expected to arrive in March 2024.
