= Celtic =

Celtic, Celtics or Keltic may refer to:

== Language and ethnicity ==
- pertaining to Celts, a collection of Indo-European peoples in Europe and Anatolia
  - Celts (modern)
- Celtic languages
  - Proto-Celtic language
- Celtic music
- Celtic nations

== Sports ==
=== Football ===
- Celtic F.C., a Scottish professional football club based in Glasgow
  - Celtic F.C. Women
- Bangor Celtic F.C., Irish, defunct
- Belfast Celtic F.C., Northern Irish, defunct
- Blantyre Celtic F.C., Scottish, defunct
- Bloemfontein Celtic F.C., South African
- Castlebar Celtic F.C., Irish
- Celtic F.C. (Jersey City), United States, defunct
- Celtic FC America, from Houston, Texas
- Celtic Nation F.C., English, defunct
- Cleator Moor Celtic F.C., English
- Cork Celtic F.C., Irish, defunct
- Cwmbran Celtic F.C., Welsh
- Derry Celtic F.C., Irish, defunct
- Donegal Celtic F.C., Northern Irish
- Dungiven Celtic F.C., Northern Irish, defunct
- Farsley Celtic F.C., English
- Leicester Celtic A.F.C., Irish
- Lurgan Celtic F.C., Northern Irish
- South Lismore Celtic F.C., Australian
- Stalybridge Celtic F.C., English
- Tuam Celtic A.F.C., Irish
- Walker Celtic F.C., English, defunct
- Wayside Celtic F.C., Irish
- West Allotment Celtic F.C., English

=== Other sports ===
- Celtic Camogie Club, Dublin, Ireland
- Celtic de Paris, a French rugby league team
- Boston Celtics, an American professional basketball team
- Dewsbury Celtic, an English rugby League club
- Oban Celtic, a Scottish shinty club

== Other uses ==
- Celtic (ship), the name of several ships
- Celtic Christianity
- "Celtic", U.S. Secret Service code name for Joe Biden
- Celtic studies
- Keltic Lodge, Canadian hotel in Nova Scotia

== See also ==
- Celt (disambiguation)
- Celtic culture (disambiguation)
- Celticism (disambiguation)
- Celtici, a Celtic tribe or group of tribes of the Iberian peninsula
- Names of the Celts
