= Celtic (ship) =

Celtic has been the name of a number of ships:

- SS Celtic (1872), a White Star Line liner
- RMS Celtic (1901), a White Star Line liner
- MV Celtic (1903), built as a sailing barge in 1903 and converted to a motorship in 1941
- USS Celtic (AF-2), a U.S. Navy supply ship
- USS Celtic (IX-137), built in 1921 as Java Arrow by Bethlehem Shipbuilding in Quincy, Massachusetts; acquired by the U.S. Navy 17 January 1944

== See also ==
- SS Celtic
- USS Celtic
