= Admiral Stirling =

Admiral Stirling may refer to:

- Charles Stirling (1760–1833), British Royal Navy vice admiral
- Frederick Stirling (1829–1885), British Royal Navy vice admiral
- James Stirling (Royal Navy officer) (1791–1865), British Royal Navy admiral
- Walter Stirling (1718–1786), British Royal Navy admiral
- Yates Stirling (1843–1929), U.S. Navy rear admiral
- Yates Stirling Jr. (1872–1948), U.S. Navy rear admiral
