= USS Dale (DD-353) =

Farragut-class destroyer

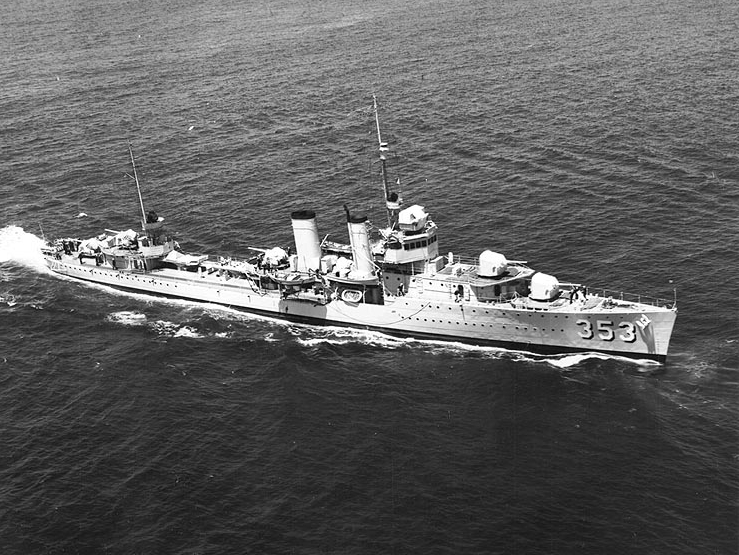
- USS Dale in April 1938

History

United States
- Name: Dale (DD-353)
- Namesake: Richard Dale
- Builder: Brooklyn Navy Yard
- Laid down: 10 February 1934
- Launched: 23 January 1935
- Commissioned: 17 June 1935
- Decommissioned: 16 October 1945
- Stricken: 1 November 1945
- Fate: Sold for scrap, 20 December 1946

General characteristics
- Class & type: Farragut-class destroyer
- Displacement: 1,500 tons
- Length: 341 ft 3 in (104.01 m)
- Beam: 34 ft 3 in (10.44 m)
- Draught: 16 ft 4 in (4.98 m)
- Speed: 36 knots (67 km/h)
- Complement: 160 officers and enlisted
- Armament: As Built: 5 × 5" (127mm)/38cal DP (5x1), 8 × 21 inch (533 mm) T Tubes (2x4), 4 × .50cal (12.7mm) MG AA (4x1); c1943: 1 × Mk 33 Gun Fire Control System; 4 × 5" (127mm)/38cal DP (4x1), 8 × 21" (533 mm) T Tubes (2x4), 5 × 20 mm AA (5x1), 2 × Mk 51 Gun Directors; 4 × 40 mm AA (2x2), 2 × Depth Charge stern racks

The fourth USS Dale (DD-353) was a Farragut-class destroyer in the United States Navy during World War II. Dale received 14 battle stars for World War II service. She was named for American Revolutionary war hero Richard Dale.

Dale was launched 23 January 1935 at the Brooklyn Navy Yard; sponsored by Mrs. E. C. Dale; and commissioned 17 June 1935. Rear Admiral Yates Stirling Jr., commandant of the Third Naval District and the Brooklyn Navy Yard, oversaw construction and presided over the commissioning. As a fourteen-year-old boy nearly 50 years earlier, Stirling had lived aboard the first USS Dale (1839) when the old sloop-of-war, her masts removed and at the end of her long service, was the station ship at the Washington Navy Yard under his father's command. Dale was decommissioned 16 October 1945 and sold 20 December 1946.

== Pre-World War II ==
Dale made a southern cruise from 13 February to 6 March 1936, visiting Norfolk, Dry Tortugas, Florida, and Galveston, Texas, and acted as escort for President F. D. Roosevelt's cruise in the Bahamas before departing for the west coast. She took part in fleet problems, made a good will visit to Callao, Peru, served as training ship for the gunnery school at San Diego, and cruised to Hawaii, Alaska, and the Caribbean on exercises.

On 5 October 1939, Dale departed San Diego to join the Hawaiian Detachment for training and patrol.

== Late 1941 Pearl Harbor Attack – early 1942 ==
At the commencement of the raid on Pearl Harbor at 0750 on 7 December 1941, the Dale was moored with ships of Destroyer Division Two at Berth X-14. The order of ships in the nest, from starboard to port, was as follows: USS Aylwin, USS Farragut, the Dale, and USS Monaghan. The ship's head was 030, and boiler number three was in use for auxiliary purposes. The deck officer and acting commanding officer, Ensign F.M. Radel, saw the first plane attack the USS Utah from westward. General Quarters was immediately sounded, and orders were given to set material condition Affirm and light all boilers. At 0810, fire was opened on Japanese planes using the after .50-caliber machine guns, followed shortly thereafter by the after five-inch anti-aircraft guns. The ships on either side of the Dale prevented the use of the forward guns, and the forward searchlight made it impossible to bring the director to bear in the direction of the level bombing attacks. The 5-inch guns operated in local control against a squadron of level bombers flying at about 10,000 feet above the battleships, but results were poor, with shots bursting well behind and short of the targets. At 0815, an enemy dive bomber attacking the USS Raleigh from westward came under severe machine gun fire from all the ships in the nest, was struck, and crashed into the harbor.

At 0820 it was reported to the senior officer in the nest—Lieutenant Commander W.P. Burford, commanding the Monaghan—that the Dale was ready to get underway. While backing clear, a torpedo apparently aimed at the Raleigh passed under the bow of the Dale and exploded on Ford Island. At 0844 the Dale stopped while the Monaghan dropped depth charges against a Japanese submarine close aboard the starboard side of the USS Curtiss. The Dale then changed speed to 25 knots and proceeded out of harbor ahead of the Monaghan. Until the Dale neared the submarine net she did not come under the direct fire of the planes; apparently the Japanese wished to sink a ship in the entrance, blocking the harbor, as the Dale came under severe dive bombing and machine gun attacks near the entrance. Machine-gun fire from the ship served to keep the attackers from approaching too closely, although there were several close misses which caused no damage.

At 0907 the Dale cleared the entrance buoys. By stopping the port engine and coming hard left rudder, she caused a flight of three Japanese dive bombers to overshoot their mark. As the flight passed by the starboard side close to the water, machine-gun fire from the Dale struck the leading plane, causing it to burst into flame and crash into the water. The remaining two planes attempted to attack again, but were driven off by machine-gun fire. At 0911, the Dale established offshore patrol in sector one, changing speed to 12 knots at 0927. Due to repeated airplane attacks the ship was forced to make frequent course changes and run at high speed. High-speed wakes and depth charging from other destroyers in the vicinity rendered the sound gear practically useless.

At 1114, the USS Worden (Commander Destroyer Squadron One) sortied. The Dale formed on the Worden as third ship in column. After investigating the falsely-reported presence of three enemy transports off Barbers Point, the ships formed an inner anti-submarine screen on the USS Detroit, USS Phoenix, USS St. Louis, and USS Astoria. The Dale was assigned station nine, and the task force speed was 25 knots.

At 1410, the pinion bearings on the reduction gear of the port engine failed. An attempt was made to stay with the assigned task force, as the maximum speed obtainable with one engine was 22 knots, but the Dale fell steadily behind. The starboard engine began overheating, forcing a further reduction of speed to 10 knots. The Dale retired to southward at 1654, stopped at 1930, and lay to until 0500 the following morning attempting repairs. At dawn the Dale rendezvoused with the task force, but as full repairs to the engine were impossible without the assistance of the tender, the Dale could not maintain her assigned screening station. Instead, under orders of Commander Destroyers, Battle Force, the Dale established an offshore patrol in sector one until the entrance of Task Group 8.4.

The Dale suffered no casualties and no enemy damage during the raid on Pearl Harbor. The Japanese plane shot down by the Dale off the entrance buoys was reported to the Commanding Officer. Two other planes, both dive bombers, were claimed by members of the crew to have been shot down by the Dale.

From 14 December 1941 to 17 March 1942, The Dale screened USS Lexington and USS Yorktown, covering the strikes on the Salamaua–Lae campaign area of New Guinea on 10 March. The Dale returned to Pearl Harbor on escort and training duty until 11 May when she departed for Mare Island and an overhaul. On 5 June she sailed from San Francisco, with others, to back up the task forces engaged in the Battle of Midway from 6 July to 17 August. She was assigned to convoy duty between Viti Levu, Fiji, and Efate and Espiritu Santo, New Hebrides, in preparation for the assault on Guadalcanal. She covered the landings, escorted transports loaded with reinforcements to the bitterly contested island from 18 August to 21 September, then sailed to Pearl Harbor for escort and training duty until 10 November. She sailed to screen the battleships USS Washington and USS South Dakota into Pearl Harbor, continuing with the South Dakota to San Francisco.

== 1943, Aleutians Campaign ==
On 9 January 1943 Dale sailed from San Francisco for duty in Aleutian waters. She supported the occupation of Amchitka between 23 January and 19 March, patrolling and repelling attacks by the Japanese. On 22 March her group sailed to patrol west of Attu to intercept and destroy enemy shipping bound for Attu or Kiska. Four days later, the group engaged a numerically superior Japanese force screening reinforcements to Attu. In the resulting Battle of the Komandorski Islands, at one time or another Dale took all of the Japanese cruisers under fire as well as screening the damaged Salt Lake City. The Japanese reinforcements failed to reach Attu. She screened transports and fire support ships into Attu for the assault on 11 May, then patrolled off Attu until 1 August. She joined in the preinvasion bombardment of Kiska 2 August, then screened the transports which landed men there 13 August. She joined Kane for a reconnaissance of Rat and Buldir Islands 22 August, finding no Japanese present.

== 1943-1944, Central Pacific ==
Sailing from Adak 5 September 1943, Dale arrived at Pearl Harbor 16 September to screen the group which on 8 October fueled carriers returning from a two-day air strike on Wake. Dale trained at Pearl Harbor until 5 November. She escorted a group of LSTs to the landings on Makin of 20 November, and then sailed for the west coast.

Dale got underway from San Diego 13 January 1944 to screen carriers during the assaults on Kwajalein and Eniwetok. She served in the Marshalls on escort and patrol until 22 March, then screened TF 58 during air attacks on Palau, Yap, Ulithi and Woleai between 30 March and 1 April raids supporting the Hollandia operations from 21 to 24 April; and strikes on Truk, Satawan and Ponape from 20 April to 1 May.

== 1944-45, Marianas, Philippines and Japan ==
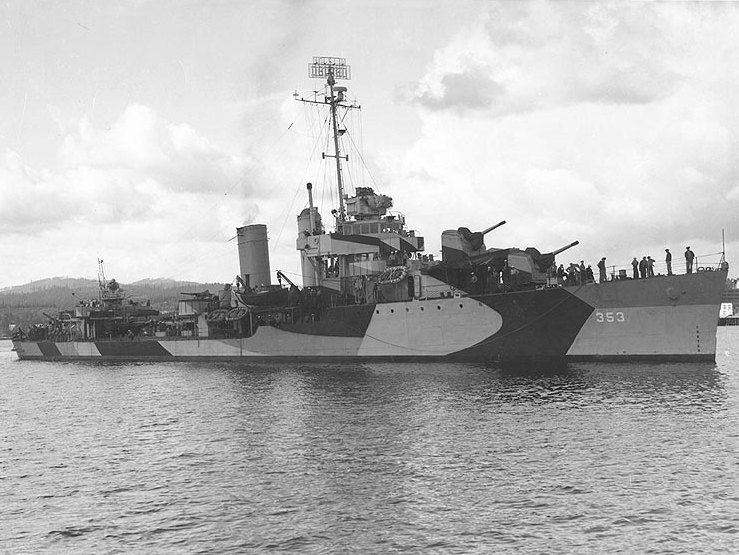
USS Dale in Puget Sound on 5 October 1944.

From 6 June to 30 July Dale served in the Marianas, bombarding Saipan and Guam, screening carriers during the Battle of the Philippine Sea, and supporting underwater demolition teams. Overhauled at Bremerton Navy Yard from August to October, Dale returned to Pearl Harbor, and then sailed to Ulithi to join TF 38. She screened this group during Philippines invasion between 25 November and 8 December; and while the group refueled TF 38 in the South China Sea during raids on the Chinese coast, Formosa, Luzon, and Okinawa. She remained with the group during carrier strikes on Tokyo and Kobe.

Dale cruised with the logistics group on five voyages between Ulithi and the Okinawa area between 13 March 1945 and 11 June when she sailed for Leyte to join a carrier division's screen. Dale returned to Leyte to escort a convoy to Ulithi and patrolled there until 29 July and then escorted a convoy to Okinawa.

== End of War and fate ==
Anchored at Guam when the war ended, Dale escorted two ships in a convoy to a rendezvous 19 August off Japan, then sailed homeward, arriving at San Diego 7 September. Four days later, she was underway for the east coast. Arriving at New York 25 September, Dale was decommissioned 16 October 1945 and was sold 20 December 1946.

Dale received 14 battle stars for World War II service.
