= Celtic culture =

Celtic culture may refer to:

- the culture of Celts
- the culture of Celts (modern)
- the culture of Celtic nations:
  - Culture of Ireland
  - Culture of Scotland
  - Culture of the Isle of Man
  - Culture of Wales
  - Culture of Cornwall
  - Culture of Brittany
  - Culture of Asturias
  - Galician culture

== See also ==
- Celt (disambiguation)
- Celtic (disambiguation)
- Celtic identity
- Celtic Revival, a variety of movements and trends in the 19th and 20th centuries that saw a renewed interest in aspects of Celtic culture
- Gaels, an ethnolinguistic group native to Ireland, Scotland and the Isle of Man
- Insular art, mostly originating from the Irish monastic movement of Celtic Christianity
- Celtic music, a broad grouping of music genres that evolved out of the folk music traditions of the Celtic people of Northwestern Europe
