= Ski Cape Smokey =

Ski hill in Nova Scotia, Canada

- Location in Nova Scotia
- Location: Victoria County, Nova Scotia, Canada
- Nearest city: Ingonish, Nova Scotia
- Coordinates: 46°26′26.4″N 60°28′7.2″W
- Status: Operating
- Opened: 1970
- Vertical: 305 m (1,001 ft)
- Top elevation: 320 m (1,050 ft)
- Base elevation: 15 m (49 ft)
- Skiable area: 100 acres (40 ha)
- Trails: 15; 2 – Easiest; 10 – More Difficult; 2 – Most Difficult; 2 – Expert
- Longest run: 2.4 km (1.5 mi)
- Lift system: 1 Gondola 1 Poma Lift
- Snowfall: 393 cm (155 in)
- Snowmaking: 60%
- Website: Ski Cape Smokey

Ski Cape Smokey is a ski hill located in Ingonish Beach, Nova Scotia, Canada; a coastal community on the Cabot Trail, flanking the boundary of the Cape Breton Highlands National Park in Cape Breton.

Since reopening under new ownership in 2021, Ski Cape Smokey offers 15 alpine runs, a gondola to summit operating year-round, a poma lift, snow-making and grooming, a ski school, a rental and retail shop, and a restaurant and bar.

Many other amenities are planned for the coming years, including a new Lodge, hotel accommodations, an elaborate look-off structure at the summit, and additional year-round trails and ski runs.

Ski Cape Smokey is known for being Nova Scotia's highest elevation ski mountain at over 320 meters, 305 of them skiable, and for its expansive ocean views. Conceived in the early 1970s after a 1968 wildfire blew northwards from Wreck cove and razed large swathes of forest on Smokey Mountain. Cape Smokey Provincial Park was established there in 1983. The ski runs are visible in their entirety from nearby Keltic Lodge, a historic golf resort on the opposite side of Ingonish Harbour. The hill receives 393 cm of snowfall per year.

== Renewal ==
After years of intermittent operations, the Ski Hill was purchased in 2019 by Cape Smokey Holding Ltd. from the Nova Scotia Government for $370,000.

The new owners' plans for the revitalization of the hill and facilities include year-round operation for a large variety of sports including Alpine Skiing, Mountain Biking, Snowshoeing, Tubing, and Hiking. An ambitious project of rehabilitation is well underway, including the gondola, which opened for 4-season operation in 2021, and is the first of its kind in Atlantic Canada.

In 2022, Ski Cape Smokey received a $950,000 grant from the federal government, for state-of-the-art snowmaking equipment to be installed halfway up the mountain. It is expected to extend the winter season for approximately 2 months per year, from November to April.

== Trails ==
| Easy (Green Circle) | Intermediate (Blue Square) | Difficult * (Black Diamond) | Expert * (Double Black Diamond) |
|---|---|---|---|
| 4 | 8 | 2 | 2 |
| Bunny Hill | Racers Edge | Pit Fall | Cliff Hanger |
| Country Mile | Hecklers Highway | Hickory Dickory Dock (g) | Check Me Shorts |
| Jigs & Reels | Boomerang |
| | Racing Pitch |
| | Chicken Chute |
| | Jigs & Reels |
| | Far Side |
| | Snowboard Heaven |

- Not Groomed: *
- Gladed trail with trees: (g)

== History ==
=== 1970-2000 ===
In the early 1970s, Owen Carter installed an access road to the summit, built a ski lodge, and established six runs. The Poma Corporation installed a new double chairlift for the resort, incorporating Harald Harb, a renowned ski instruction expert known for his publications on carving techniques.

The ski area attracted visitors from nearby Ingonish, Sydney, Nova Scotia, and Antigonish. Despite its appeal, Ski Cape Smokey faced challenging weather conditions, typically experiencing snow from Armistice Day to Christmas and from Valentine's Day to April, with rainy periods in between.

The original lodge was destroyed by fire in 1979. The lodge was rebuilt in 1982 and sold to the province of Nova Scotia who installed a new chair lift, but ultimately closed the hill in 1993. The Nova Scotia government leased it for 20 years to the Ski Cape Smokey Society, a local non-profit group, who ran the hill on a volunteer basis, and acted as caretakers of the hill between periods of commercial viability

=== 2000-2019 ===
Beginning in 2002 the operation of the ski resort suffered due to financial problems. The low population base in the local area and remoteness from population centers were factors in the hill's lack of viability. The two provincial population centers, Sydney and Halifax, are 90 minutes and 4.5 hours away by car, respectively. In 2006, the ski hill was closed.

In February 2011, Ski Cape Smokey was re-opened, with a limited scope, using the lower mountain poma lift. Without snow-making equipment, it could not operate in the vital Christmas and New Year holiday season.

== See also ==
- List of ski areas and resorts in Canada
