= Ingonish =

Rural community in Victoria County, Nova Scotia, Canada

Coordinates: 46°38′21″N 60°24′29″W

Location in Nova Scotia

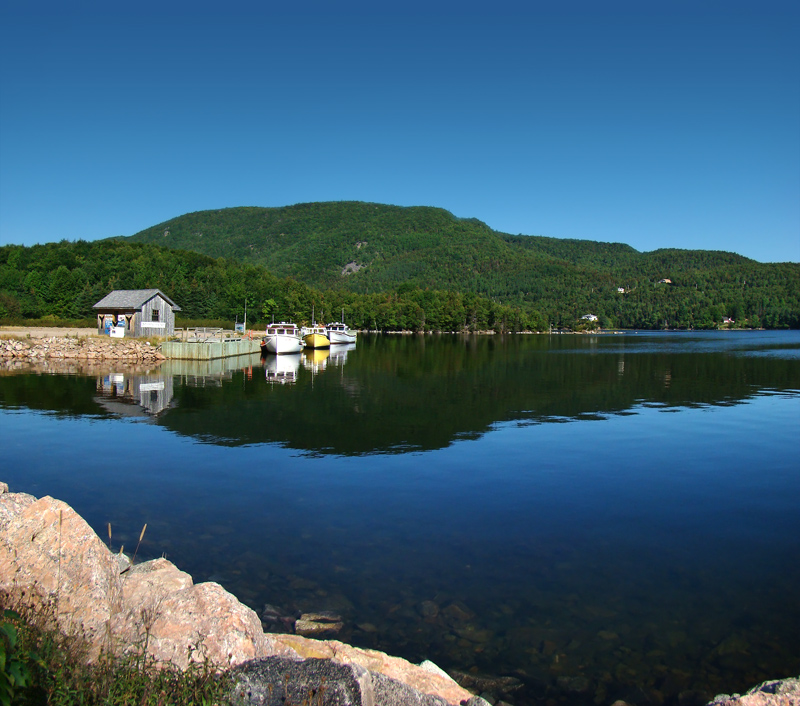
Ingonish Harbour

Ingonish is a popular tourist destination in Victoria County, Cape Breton Island, Nova Scotia, Canada. The regional economy is tied to fishing and tourism. Tourist facilities include Cape Breton Highlands National Park, the Keltic Lodge, a year-round gravity sports facility, Ski Cape Smokey, and a public golf course, the Highlands Links.

== History ==
The name may be from the Portuguese or Mi'kmaq languages. French explorer Nicolas Denys visited the area in the 1600s, and he made note of the area's potential as a base of operations for French fishing fleets having good fishing though a harsh coastline and no safe harbour.

In 1854, local farmers plowing a field found an Acadian chapel bell, upon which was inscribed:

Pour la paroisse d’Inganiche jai ete nommee par Jean Decarette et par Francois Uril, parrain et marrain Le Josse Huet de St. Malo m’a faite. L’an 1729.

An 1885 English translation reads:

For the parish of Ingonish I have been named by John Decarette and Francis Urail, Godfather and Godmother. The founder Huet made me in the year 1729.

The bell was described as being "nearly as large around as an ordinary flour barrel" and weighed 586 pounds. It was ultimately lost after being sold to a foundry owner in Halifax. In another part of Ingonish, the remains of a second church were found. A small cannon of French origin, similar to those found at Neil's Harbour was also found.

According to an official report sent to the Board of Trade in 1749 by Captain Smith, commander of the guard ship at Canso, there were 48 schooners and 393 shallops fishing the grounds off Ingonish. The community's population at that time was estimated to be approximately 300.

Mica was mined prior to the late 1800s.

== Climate ==
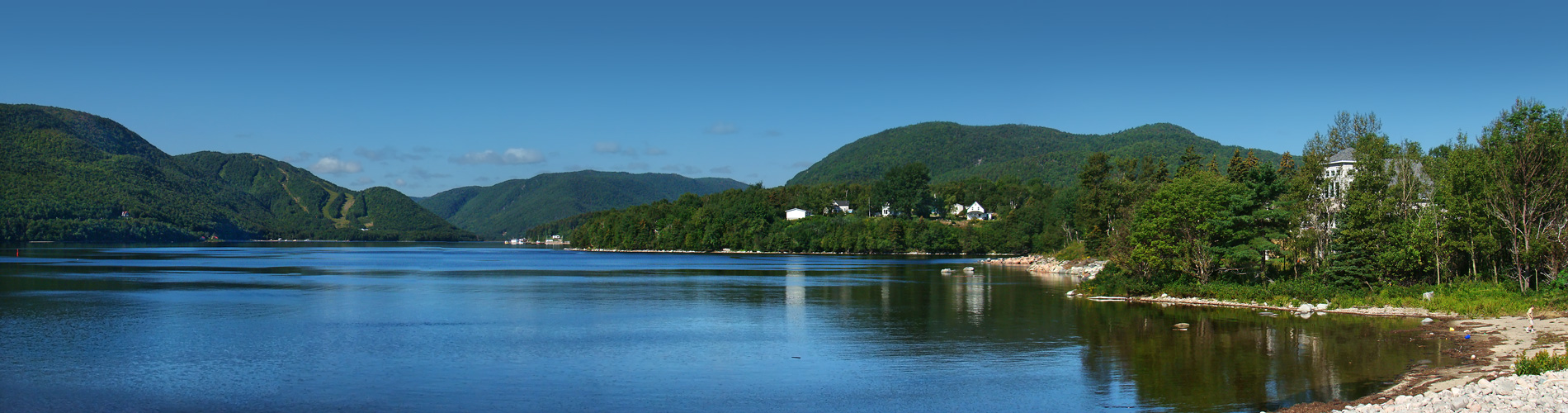
Ingonish Beach

Ingonish Beach

Climate chart (precipitation, max. and min. temperature)
J	F	M	A	M	J	J	A	S	O	N	D
159 0 −8	136 −1 −9	144 3 −6	130 7 −1	96 13 3	97 19 8	86 24 13	105 24 14	133 20 10	175 14 5	156 8 1	195 3 −4
- █ Average max. and min. temperatures in °C
- █ Precipitation totals in mm
- Source: Environment and Climate Change Canada
Imperial conversion
J	F	M	A	M	J	J	A	S	O	N	D
6.3 31 17	5.3 31 15	5.7 37 21	5.1 45 29	3.8 56 38	3.8 65 47	3.4 75 56	4.1 76 57	5.2 68 50	6.9 56 41	6.1 47 34	7.7 37 26
- █ Average max. and min. temperatures in °F
- █ Precipitation totals in inches

Ingonish has a humid continental climate (Dfb) with extremely high precipitation for this climate (annual average precipitation being 69 inches, or ~1358 millimeters, the highest anywhere in Canada outside coastal British Columbia). Furthermore, Ingonish experiences its wettest months from November to January, with over 7.3 inches of precipitation each month, much of it falling as snow, while June and July are the driest months, but still averaging over 3.5 inches of precipitation each. The area is now prone to large rainstorms, and sometimes major flooding two to three times per year, usually in the months of February, August, and November. The highest 24-hour rainfall total recorded in Ingonish was on 23 November 2021 when the area received varying rainfall amounts of between 260 and 292 millimeters of rain in just 19 hours. Winters are long, cold, snowy and exceptionally stormy. In December and January, snow can fall nearly every day due to sea-effect snow showers which blow in from the unfrozen Gulf of St. Lawrence. Primarily from October to April, Ingonish is also prone to intense nor'easters – mid-latitude cyclones that approach from the U.S. Northeastern and New England states, bringing high winds and heavy precipitation, especially snowfall. As winter progresses, the surrounding waters become covered in ice which delays the onset of spring. Summer arrives quickly though, usually in mid to late June. The cold spring gives way to a beautiful summer, with lots of warm, sunny days. In summer, the weather pattern shifts to a warm southwest flow, and lasts into the fall. These warm southwest winds blow down-slope from the Cape Breton Highlands, drying out and warming as it descends. Although the surrounding water freezes during winter, it warms very quickly through the summer, with sea surface temperatures peaking around 21 °C (70 °F) in August. The highest temperature ever recorded was 37.7 °C (99.9 °F) on 10 August 2001. The lowest temperature was −28.0 °C (−18.4 °F) on 18 January 1982. Weather data has been recorded at Parks Canada in Ingonish Beach since 1950. In 2000, Environment Canada upgraded the climate station to an automated weather station.

Climate data for Ingonish Beach, 1991–2020 normals, extremes 1950–present
Month	Jan	Feb	Mar	Apr	May	Jun	Jul	Aug	Sep	Oct	Nov	Dec	Year
Record high °C (°F)	17.5 (63.5)	19.0 (66.2)	21.3 (70.3)	24.0 (75.2)	32.2 (90.0)	34.5 (94.1)	36.0 (96.8)	37.7 (99.9)	34.9 (94.8)	29.6 (85.3)	25.5 (77.9)	18.0 (64.4)	37.7 (99.9)
Mean daily maximum °C (°F)	−0.3 (31.5)	−0.5 (31.1)	2.7 (36.9)	7.1 (44.8)	13.1 (55.6)	18.6 (65.5)	23.9 (75.0)	24.2 (75.6)	20.2 (68.4)	13.6 (56.5)	8.2 (46.8)	3.0 (37.4)	11.2 (52.2)
Daily mean °C (°F)	−4.3 (24.3)	−5.0 (23.0)	−1.7 (28.9)	2.9 (37.2)	8.1 (46.6)	13.5 (56.3)	18.7 (65.7)	19.0 (66.2)	15.1 (59.2)	9.3 (48.7)	4.6 (40.3)	−0.3 (31.5)	6.7 (44.1)
Mean daily minimum °C (°F)	−8.2 (17.2)	−9.4 (15.1)	−6.2 (20.8)	−1.4 (29.5)	3.1 (37.6)	8.3 (46.9)	13.4 (56.1)	13.8 (56.8)	10.0 (50.0)	4.9 (40.8)	0.9 (33.6)	−3.6 (25.5)	2.1 (35.8)
Record low °C (°F)	−28.0 (−18.4)	−27.5 (−17.5)	−24.9 (−12.8)	−15.0 (5.0)	−7.0 (19.4)	−1.7 (28.9)	3.9 (39.0)	1.0 (33.8)	−6.7 (19.9)	−6.5 (20.3)	−12.5 (9.5)	−20.0 (−4.0)	−28.0 (−18.4)
Average precipitation mm (inches)	158.8 (6.25)	135.7 (5.34)	144.2 (5.68)	130.1 (5.12)	95.8 (3.77)	97.3 (3.83)	86.4 (3.40)	104.6 (4.12)	132.8 (5.23)	174.7 (6.88)	156.2 (6.15)	194.8 (7.67)	1,611.5 (63.44)
Average snowfall cm (inches)	105.6 (41.6)	77.8 (30.6)	71.8 (28.3)	36.1 (14.2)	3.8 (1.5)	0.0 (0.0)	0.0 (0.0)	0.0 (0.0)	0.0 (0.0)	0.2 (0.1)	21.8 (8.6)	76.0 (29.9)	393.1 (154.8)
Average precipitation days (≥ 0.2 mm)	21.6	17.0	17.5	16.5	15.3	14.1	13.5	14.5	15.2	18.0	20.3	20.7	204.3
Average snowy days (≥ 0.2 cm)	18.2	13.0	10.8	5.0	0.5	0.0	0.0	0.0	0.0	0.2	6.1	14.2	67.7
Average relative humidity (%) (at 15:00 LST)	71.8	68.2	63.2	64.5	65.2	67.1	65.5	63.0	63.1	68.3	73.5	75.6	67.4
Mean monthly sunshine hours	77.5	108.1	128.5	144.8	199.6	227.1	237.6	215.7	157.9	117.6	69.0	43.3	1,726.6
Percentage possible sunshine	27.7	37.1	34.9	35.6	42.9	48.0	49.7	49.1	41.8	34.7	24.4	16.2	36.8
Source: Environment Canada (snow, sun 1981–2010)
