= Yates Stirling Jr. =

American admiral (1872–1948)

Rear Admiral Yates Stirling Jr.
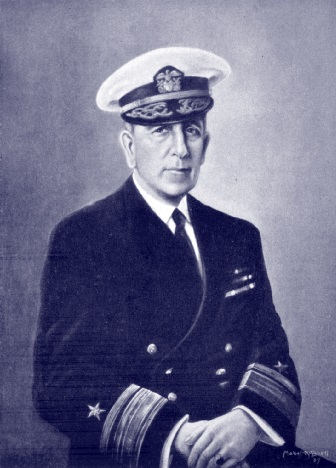
- RADM Yates Stirling Jr. from a portrait by Mabel Buell
- Born: April 30, 1872; Vallejo, California, US
- Died: January 27, 1948 (aged 75); Baltimore, Maryland, US
- Burial place: Arlington National Cemetery
- Relatives: RADM Yates Stirling Sr., USN (father); CDR Archibald G. Stirling, USN (brother); CAPT Yates Stirling III, USN (son); CDR Harry E. Stirling, USN (son); TEC4 Adelaide S. Boyd, USA (daughter)
- Military career
- Allegiance: United States of America
- Branch: United States Navy
- Service years: 1892–1936
- Rank: Rear admiral
- Nickname: "the Stormy Petrel of the Navy"
- Commands: USS Paragua; USS Paulding; USS Salem; USS Ozark; USS Tonopah; USS Columbia; Submarine Flotilla, Atlantic Fleet; Naval Submarine Base New London; USS Chicago; USS President Lincoln; USS Von Steuben; USS Connecticut; USS New Mexico; Yangtze Patrol; 14th Naval District (Hawaii); 3rd Naval District (New York)
- Conflicts: Spanish–American War; Philippines – Moro Rebellion; Veracruz Expedition; World War I
- Awards: Navy Cross; French Legion of Honor; Venezuela Order of the Liberator; Order of the Crown of Italy

Yates Stirling Jr. (April 30, 1872 – January 27, 1948) was a decorated and controversial rear admiral in the United States Navy whose 44-year career spanned from several years before the Spanish–American War to the mid-1930s. He was awarded the Navy Cross and French Legion of Honor for distinguished service during World War I. The elder son of Rear Admiral Yates Stirling, he was an outspoken advocate of American sea power as a strong deterrent to war and to protect and promote international commerce. During Stirling's naval career and following retirement, he was a frequent lecturer, newspaper columnist and author of numerous books and articles, including his memoirs, Sea Duty: The Memoirs of a Fighting Admiral, published in 1939. Describing himself, Stirling wrote, "All my life I have been called a stormy petrel. I have never hesitated to use the pen to reveal what I considered should be brought to public attention, usually within the Navy, but often to a wider public. I seem to see some benefits that have come through those efforts. I have always believed that a naval man is disloyal to his country if he does not reveal acts that are doing harm to his service and show, if he can, how to remedy the fault. An efficient Navy cannot be run with 'yes men' only."

== Early life and education ==
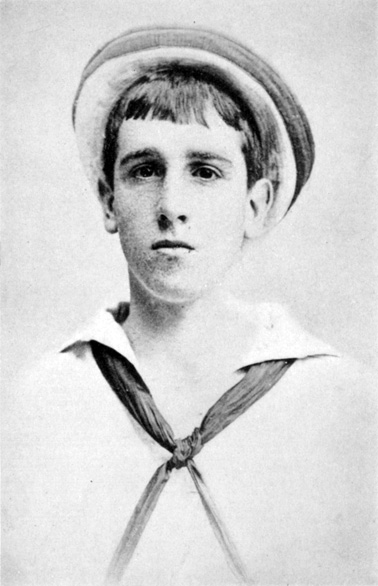
Naval Cadet Yates Stirling Jr.

Yates Stirling Jr. was born in Vallejo, California, in 1872 to Lieutenant Commander Yates Stirling Sr. (1843–1929) (United States Naval Academy Class of 1863) and his wife, Ellen Salisbury (née Hale) Stirling. At the time of Yates Jr.'s birth, his father was assigned to the USS Independence, receiving ship at Mare Island Naval Shipyard. From an established Maryland family, Stirling was a great-grandson of Thomas Yates (1740–1815), captain, Fourth Battalion, Maryland Regulars during the American Revolutionary War. When he was about four, Stirling's family moved to Baltimore, Maryland, the home of his father and grandfather. He was one of five children that survived to adulthood and the oldest of two boys, both of whom followed their father's footsteps to the U.S. Naval Academy at Annapolis. His younger brother, Commander Archibald G. Stirling (1884–1963) (United States Naval Academy Class of 1906) retired in 1933 but returned to active duty from 1942 to 1945 during World War II. The Yates Stirling family was the second in U.S. Naval history to have father and son flag officers (rear admirals) living at the same time. The first were Rear Admirals Thomas O. Selfridge Sr. and Jr.

As a boy living in Baltimore's upper west side, Stirling attended public schools where, despite a professed dislike of physical combat, he had a reputation of being a fighter. While his father was at sea for as long as three years at a time, Stirling had a happy home life with a mother that instilled a love for reading and provided private teachers that enabled him to skip grades at school, though Stirling admitted he was not a good student. During his father's cruise absences, the family's only knowledge of his well-being came in bulky packets of letters arriving in bunches over long intervals that Stirling's mother, Ellen, would read aloud to her children. The exciting details of life on a warship—"gales, tropical coral reefs, savage people, hunting, and yellow fever"—influenced Stirling's desire for the naval life. But he saw that it was not without sacrifice. A younger brother was about three when Stirling's father left Baltimore for a long cruise. A few months later, the boy contracted diphtheria and died. Another younger brother, Archie, was born shortly after that. Yates Stirling Jr. wondered how his father must have felt when he returned home and saw a new son that was nearly the same age as the one he had lost.

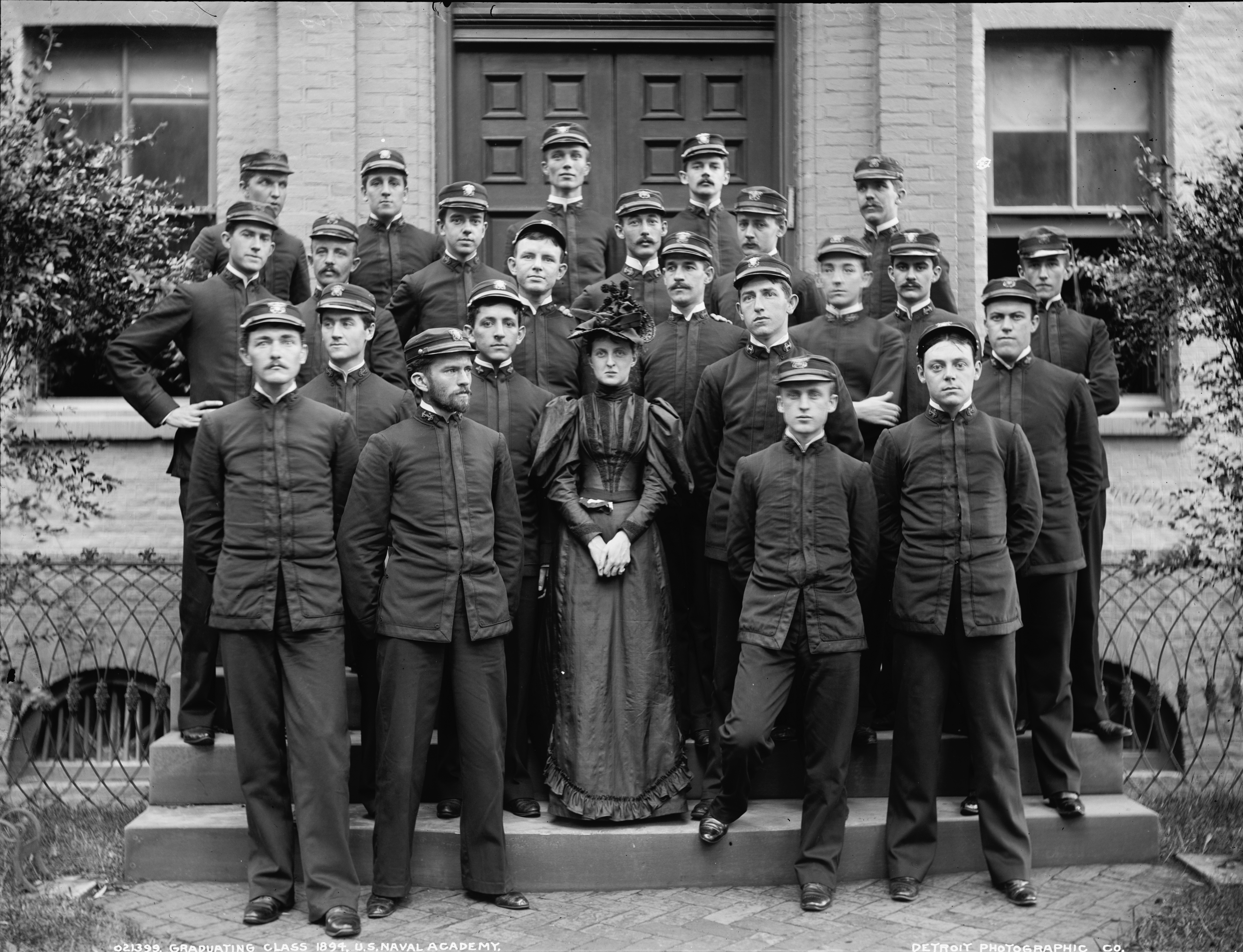
Passed Naval Cadet Yates Stirling Jr. (top row, second from left) with members of USNA Class of 1892, taken in 1894. Note the officer cap and collar insignia but without rank that designated passed naval cadets prior to commissioning as ensigns.

When Stirling was nearly fifteen, his father was given command of the old sloop-of-war USS Dale, the receiving ship at the Washington Navy Yard. CDR Stirling moved his family from Baltimore to Washington, D.C., where the family set up comfortable, but cramped living quarters on the Dale. Stirling was delighted with the change, and when he wasn't at school, enjoyed sailing on the Anacostia and Potomac Rivers in a boat that the Dale's sailors had rigged for him. Thrown in with the sons of naval officers at the Navy Yard, he soon realized that like himself, most aspired to naval careers. When Yates Jr. was fifteen, his father had taken him to the White House for the purpose of meeting President Grover Cleveland and requesting an appointment to Annapolis for his son. Dressed in shorts, that Stirling later regretted wearing since they accentuated his youthful looks, he recalled Cleveland telling his father, "Why, Commander, your son looks too young to go to Annapolis this year. Maybe next, it will be possible. Shall I have his name put down for an appointment then?"

Although a Marylander, Stirling secured his appointment to the Naval Academy the following year from William Whiting, congressman from Massachusetts's 11th congressional district. Whiting was a family friend and Stirling's frequent ice-skating companion on the Potomac. Since no one from Whiting's district had sought an appointment that year, it could be filled by the Secretary of the Navy at the Congressman's request. Whiting wrote the Secretary and it was done. Stirling reported for examinations that he passed and entered Annapolis on September 6, 1888. Naval Cadet Stirling continued his less than stellar academic endeavors at Annapolis. "I lacked fundamental grounding in the various basic subjects, but, even worse, I had not formed the habit of close application and was much keener for games and pranks than for my studies. At times, however, things seemed easy enough, showing that after all my brain was sound but that it needed much disciplining."

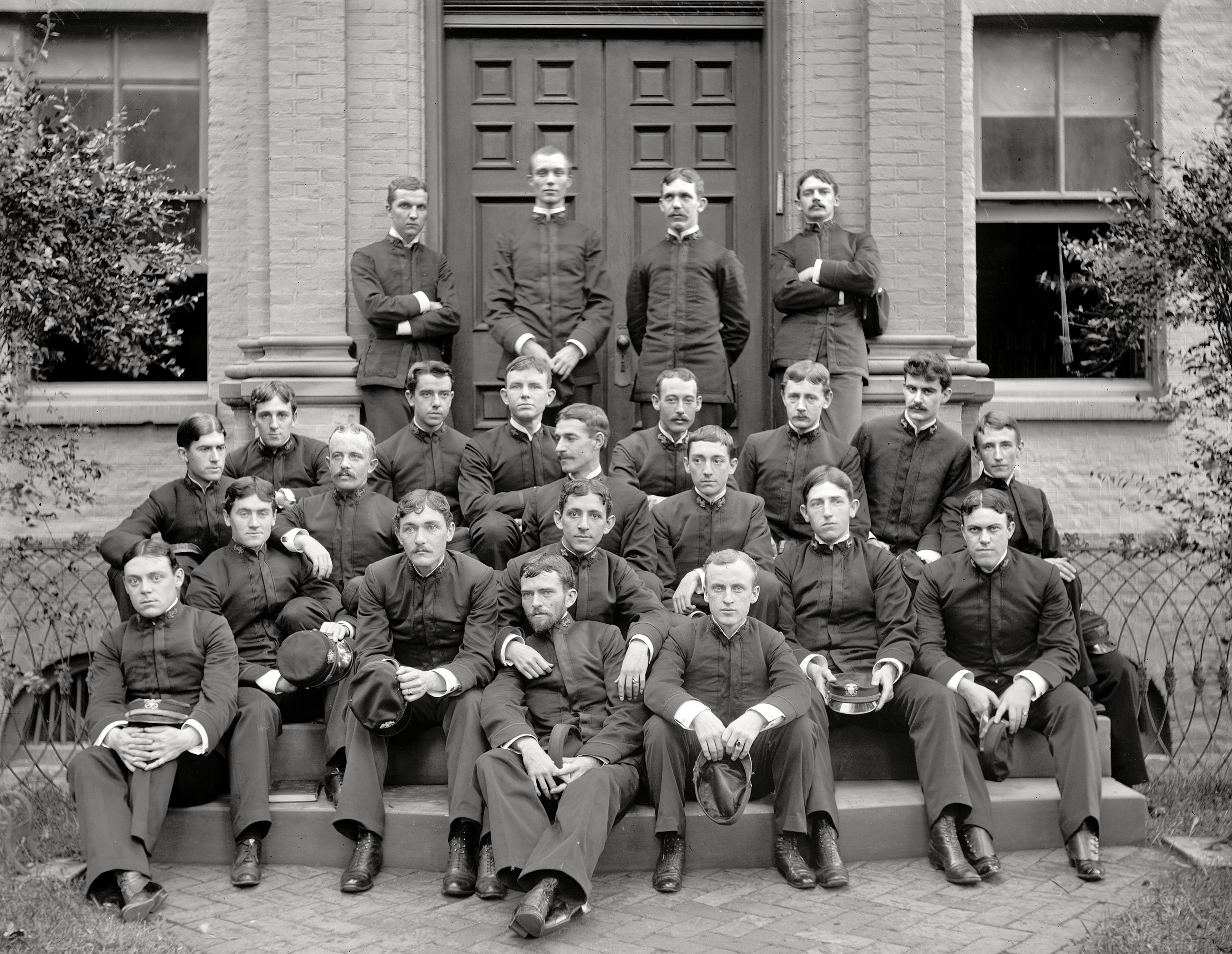
Yates Stirling Jr. (seated, upper left) with members of USNA Class of 1892

During the three-month, first-class training cruise on the pre-Civil War sloop-of-war USS Constellation, before beginning his final academic year, Stirling and another cadet were ordered aloft during a severe squall to shorten sail and send down the topgallant and royal sail yards. "[s]queezing out tar on every handhold to prevent being blown out into space by the great force of the wind and the pressure of the solid sheets of rain", Stirling climbed up two vertical shrouds and Jacob's ladders to the top gallant yard, 120 feet above the deck. Succeeding in furling the sails and lowering the yards by "exerting every ounce of strength we could muster and while the gale was at its height", Stirling wrote in his memoirs forty years later, "The physical condition and the confidence acquired that enable you to hang, without batting an eye, by one hand in space with a yawning drop below you are things the modern sailor never attains. That sense of exaltation was well worth the price paid." Having been in the bottom third of his class during the first three years at Annapolis, in his final year of studies, Stirling found the courses more practical to the knowledge and skill he would need as a naval officer. Applying himself to ensure his standing would be high enough to be offered a commission, he improved his academic ranking that year and graduated from the United States Naval Academy on June 3, 1892, twenty-second in a class of forty.

== Naval career ==
=== Early years ===
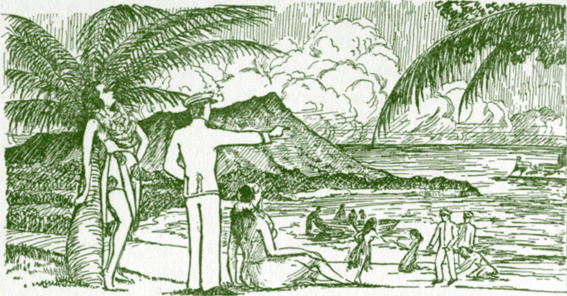
Ch. 2, "Sea Duty", by Yates Stirling Jr.

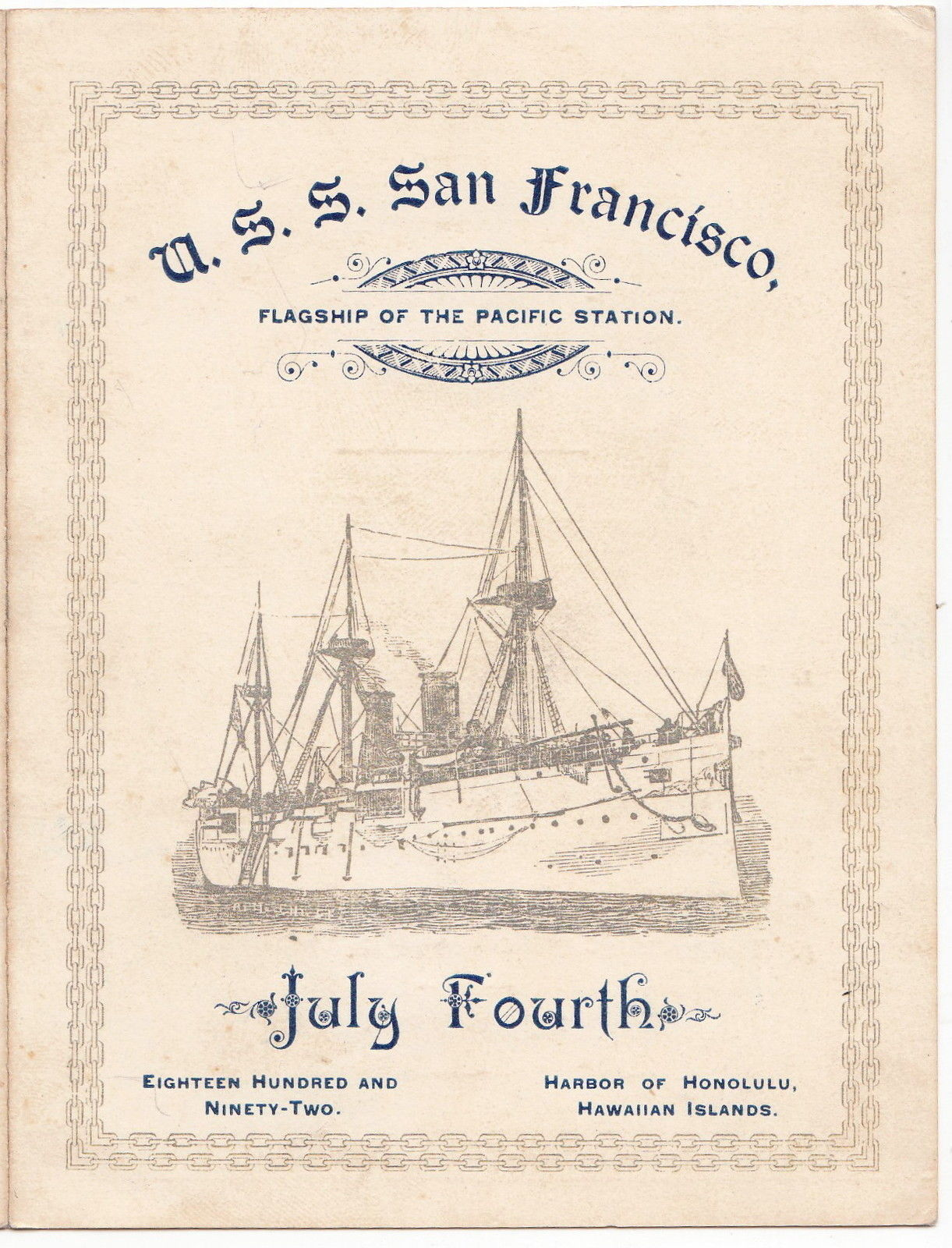
USS San Francisco, program of 4 July 1892 Independence Day festivities

During the two years at sea then required of a naval cadet that had passed his academic studies before commissioning as an ensign, Stirling was first assigned to the protected cruiser USS San Francisco (C-5) that he and four other cadets joined in the Sandwich Islands, (as the Territory of Hawaii was also known) in July 1892. Seeing these exotic islands that he had heard about in his father's stories, despite the tropical setting Stirling was somewhat disappointed to find no "truly Hawaiian villages" and that "Hawaiian life even then had merged into Western civilization or Oriental." Observing the miscegenation of whites with the indigenous Hawaiians during the few weeks his ship was at Hawaii, he later wrote in his memoirs, "I found them most wholesome companions, although I had the feeling that I must be careful not to fall in love. It seemed strange to see a dignified white official surrounded by children with skins as dark as a mulatto." Stirling's nineteenth century ethnic and cultural beliefs aside, he noted the geopolitical undercurrents of the importance of Hawaii to the United States, Great Britain and Japan as each maintained a naval presence. "All three nations were watching each other to be sure no one would obtain advantage over another and become too powerful in Court circles. Hawaii was known to be an important strategical location with great commercial prospects. The United States would not have permitted any other nation to seize the Islands, yet at that time, the Administration in Washington, under President Cleveland, did not feel itself strong enough to take them for this country. Our method, therefore, was one of watchful waiting and maintaining friendly relations with the Hawaiian Queen (Liliuokalani) and her government." Japan's long-standing ambitions in the Pacific were driving a naval buildup for the First Sino-Japanese War two years later and eventually for war with the U.S., as Stirling would predict in articles and lectures in the 1930s and as others such as Homer Lea, had foretold as early as the first decade of the twentieth century.

San Francisco was relieved of duty in Hawaii in mid-August 1892 and set out for repairs at Mare Island. Following repairs, Stirling's ship joined a squadron of two other cruisers, USS Baltimore (C-3), USS Charleston (C-2) and a gunboat, USS Bennington (PG-4) bound for a large naval review at New York as part of the following year's (1893) Chicago World's Fair. At Acapulco Bay, Mexico, "celebrated for its man‑eating sharks", Stirling was visiting Charleston and accepted the challenge of the Catholic chaplain, Father William H. Reaney, to swim off the anchored ship. "We donned our bathing trunks. The chaplain dove first off the gangway, and I followed him. When I struck the water, all the ghastly stories I had ever heard of sharks came into my mind. I swam swiftly back to the gangway, getting there just as (chaplain) Rainnie (sic) reached it. He said, breathlessly: 'I don't think we should put too much confidence in the Lord's being able to protect us from our own stupidity.'" Back aboard, the officer of the deck pointed out several black fins where Stirling had been swimming moments earlier. During the voyage around South America and through the Straits of Magellan, the ship made ports of call at Callao, Peru, Valparaiso, Chile and Montevideo, Uruguay to show the flag and cement generally good relations "where considerable American gold was spent" and where the local officials lavishly entertained the Admiral and officers.

=== Brazilian Naval Revolution ===
San Francisco arrived at Hampton Roads, Virginia, in February 1893 and with other U.S. and foreign ships, assembled for the naval review. "I was much impressed by the smartness and cleanliness of the British warships. No others seemed as well kept, with the exception of our own. The peculiarities of the French construction and arrangement came in for considerable attention. The appearance of their ships seemed almost grotesque. The Italian ships seemed to be modeled after the British. The discipline of the German tars caused much comment. It seemed so unnecessarily strict." Stirling transferred to the Charleston in October 1893, when the cruiser steamed south from Hampton Roads towards the Strait of Magellan on its return to the Pacific Coast. Charleston anchored at Rio de Janeiro, Brazil where it was ordered to protect American interests and shipping from disturbance during the Brazilian Naval Revolution that had erupted in September with Brazilian admirals Custódio José de Melo and Saldanha da Gama commanding a rebel force that included the formidable battleship Aquidaban, several cruisers, Republica, Tamandaré, Trajano, Guanbara and a few smaller frigates and gunboats that were blockading the port of Rio de Janeiro in a mutiny against the government of General Floriano Peixoto whose regime was recognized by the United States. When Charleston arrived, there was a British gunboat and two Portuguese cruisers in the harbor. Charleston's captain, Henry F. Picking, due to his rank, became senior officer of the foreign navies in port and by international custom was regarded as the leader in concerted actions. To determine whether the city could be bombarded by the rebel navy under the rules of war, it was necessary to determine whether the city was fortified. Picking ordered Stirling and Ensign H. E. Smith ashore to find out.

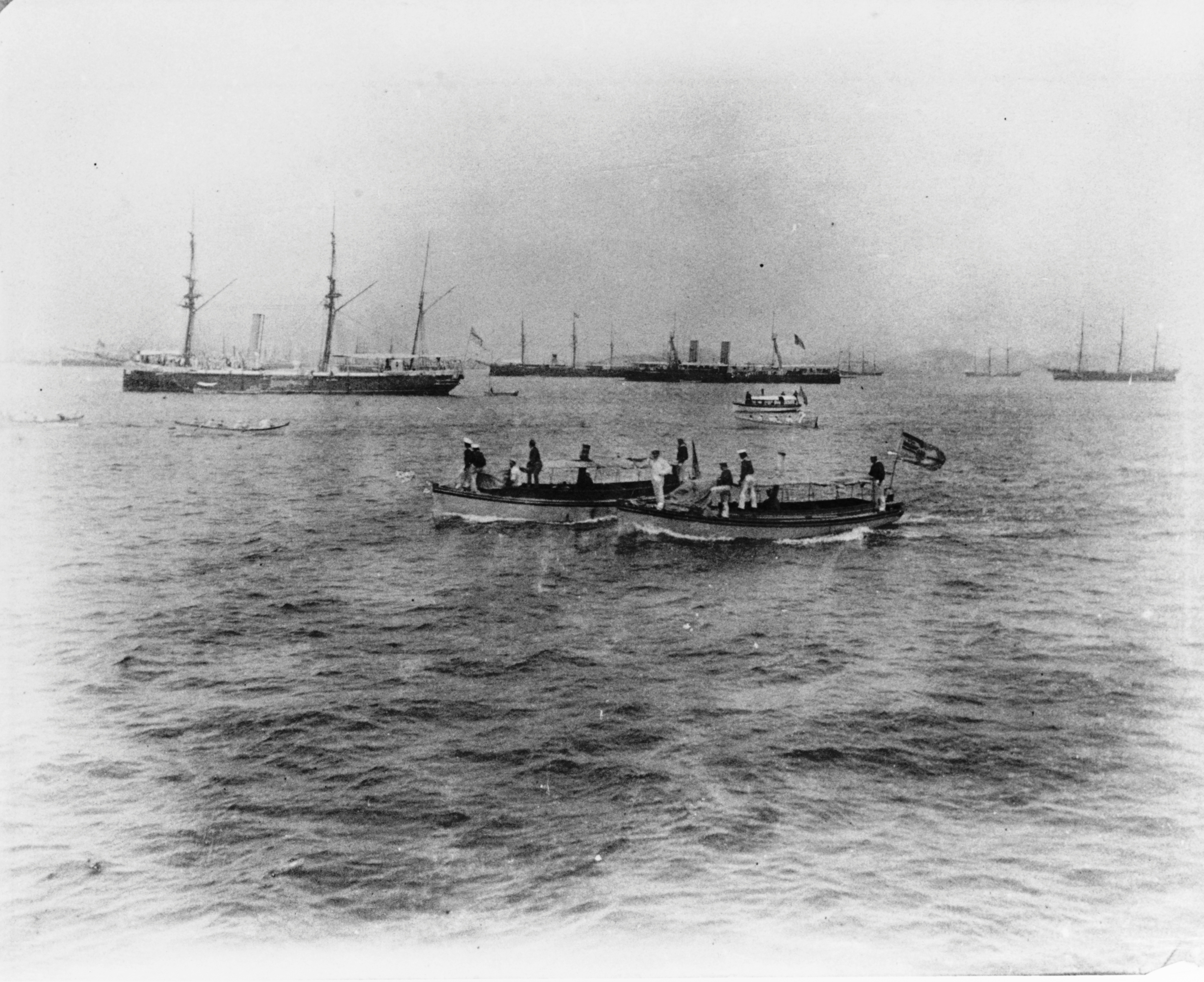
Foreign warships in Rio de Janeiro Harbor, seen from USS Charleston, which hosted a celebration on Thanksgiving Day, 1893

Dressed as civilians to conceal their naval affiliation, the pair separated to reconnoiter the city. Smith was arrested and later released following intervention by the American consul. Posing as a tourist from one of the American schooners in the harbor, Stirling gained the confidence of several Brazilian soldiers who obliging showed him several "fairly large" concealed artillery emplacements. "They kept me for lunch, and we drank many toasts in some very fair brandy. They were so openly cordial and trusting that my conscience pricked me when, from memory, I sketched for Captain Picking the positions of the guns I had seen. The foreign captains then removed the ban on bombardment, notifying both sides that they considered the city was fortified and therefore not a defenseless city as the government had been claiming. The Brazilian Navy, however, never used its authority to bombard. I was glad of this, for the city was so beautiful and belonged to the navy as well as to its defenders."

Stirling later recounted, that while on Charleston, where he made numerous forays on the ship's steam launch into the harbor, "I was under more dangerous gunfire in Rio Harbor during that revolution than during the whole of the Spanish War". On one occasion as he prepared to return to ship on the steam launch from the marine arsenal quay, Stirling's curiosity got the better of him as he lingered to observe a skirmish between Brazilian troops and rebels on Villegagnon Island, location of the Brazilian Naval Academy. While Stirling was "foolishly exposing myself to stray bullets", a well-dressed man approached and introduced himself as a Brazilian naval officer and ordnance expert, just returned from England on a British merchant ship. The man told him that he would be shot if captured and implored Stirling to ferry him to admiral da Gama at Enchades Island. Stirling had been to this small island in the center of the city many times before when delivering messages for Captain Picking. With little thought of the consequences to himself, and noting that "youth is ever romantic and trusting", Stirling bade the rebel, "I cannot offer you asylum, but if you should get into my boat, I could not put you out." The man dove into the launch. Ordering the coxswain to steer in close to the seawall for the Brazilian to jump off, Stirling told his passenger, "A word to the wise is sufficient" and wished him good luck. The next day, as the new Brazilian cruiser Tamandaré began shelling the marine arsenal and the Nictheroy battery, the "enormity of [his] crime" dawned on Stirling. "I had given aid to a rebel. The rebel I had aided was now firing at the government my country recognized. I worried for a while afterward over this most unneutral service I had given, because, if it became known to our captain, he would have no other recourse than to order me before a court-martial. However, I have never regretted my action and have often wondered what became of my Brazilian. I did receive word from him once through one of our medical officers who had seen him on board the Tamandaré after an explosion on that vessel when we had sent medical aid."

As the months passed and the naval blockade of Rio harbor continued, Charleston was joined by other American cruisers, San Francisco, USS Newark (C-1), USS Detroit (C-10) and the armored cruiser USS New York (ACR-2), flagship of Rear Admiral Andrew E. K. Benham, who assumed command of the squadron from Captain Picking. Stirling believed that the end of the naval blockade, hence the revolution, came about in January 1894 when Benham met with da Gama and convinced him to surrender, after financial backing for the naval insurrection had dwindled. "The next sunrise saw the little Detroit, under Commander W. H. Brownson, steam in between two larger Brazilian cruisers, the Republica and the Trajano, and lie there with her guns trained on both warships. It looked as if there would be a battle, and the forces were fairly well matched. Meanwhile a Navy steam launch, with a big United States flag flying conspicuously, began to tow one of our schooners loaded with flour towards the docks. Brownson called out to the rebel cruisers: 'If you fire at my launch, I'll fire into you. If you return my fire, I'll sink you.' The Republica fired a rifle shot in the direction of the launch. It struck in the water near the boat. Brownson then commanded the marine gun pointer at the six‑pounder on his forecastle: 'Hit her (pointing to the Republica) between wind and water, six feet abaft the stern.' That order was far too technical for the "devil dog." He thought it the better part of valor for him to play safe. He did not want to be responsible for starting a war. So he fired, and the shell hit the water about six feet ahead of the cruiser. Both Brazilian warships then fired lee guns and hoisted large white flags, hauling down the ensign. They had surrendered to the Detroit. Meanwhile, the shell from the marine's gun was still going. It had ricocheted and passed close over the bridge of the New York. Captain Jack Philip was on the bridge. He thought the fight was on and headed his ship at full speed for the Aquidaban in the upper part of the bay. He was recalled by signal flags before anything serious had happened. The defeated Brazilian naval personnel almost at once began to arrive alongside the Portuguese warships, where they were given asylum. The cruisers Tamandarey and Trajano were abandoned. The Portuguese warships left the bay before dark loaded to the guards with Brazilian sailors. The Aquidaban and the Republica fought their way out through the entrance during the night. Rio was open. The morning after Benham's bloodless battle, an important New York newspaper, the Herald, published a news story praising Benham's timely action. I heard that the Navy Department tore up a cable of censure to the Admiral. American sentiment was behind Benham. I am sure that Admiral Benham acted entirely on his own and with no instructions from Washington." In his memoirs published more than forty years later, Stirling recounted two observations from his months observing the Brazilian Naval Revolution as a passed naval cadet: that high-ranking officers such as Admiral Benham in those days could perform diplomatic and military functions autonomously and with greater effectiveness than Washington; and that "how much better was our democracy, where the most important differences between factions were settled through the ballot instead of the bullet."

After a leisurely cruise from Montevideo, Uruguay, Charleston arrived in San Francisco on 8 July 1894 to prepare for a return to the Asiatic Station. Promoted to ensign on 1 July 1894 upon his final graduation, Stirling next reported for duty on board USS New York on 16 August 1894. In 1896 and 1897, he served on the USS Thetis and the Fish Commission steamer USS Albatross. In 1898 and 1899 he was assigned to the USS Badger.

Stirling's first published fiction, a short story titled, The Battle off the Hook, appeared in the August 31, 1897, edition of Harper's Roundtable. A contemporary review described it as, "[a] vivid account by Ensign Yates Stirling Jr. U.S.N. of a great sea fight off Sandy Hook, in which the United States fleet engages that of a first rate power. The date is tantalizingly vague, the identity of the enemy only hinted, but the issue of the battle is what every patriotic American boy will anticipate."

=== Spanish–American War ===
During the Spanish–American War in 1898, Stirling was attached to the converted gunboat USS Dolphin, which his father had commended a few years earlier. Stirling, along with Ensign William C. Cole, each commanded whaleboats that daily engaged in the difficult and dangerous clearing of Spanish mines from Guantánamo Bay. Dolphin's captain, Henry W Lyon later wrote of Stirling and Cole's small boat forays, "It was as plucky an enterprise as ever I witnessed. Day after day these young officers ventured close in shore within pistol shot of a defense chaparral, where Spaniards could have fired with certain aim upon them with impunity, yet they went about their work as unmindful of their peril as if demonstrating a problem in geometry in a classroom."

=== Philippine insurrection ===
During the native insurrection in the Philippines he commanded the gunboat USS Paragua, as a lieutenant from January 1900 to December 1900.

=== Inter-war years ===
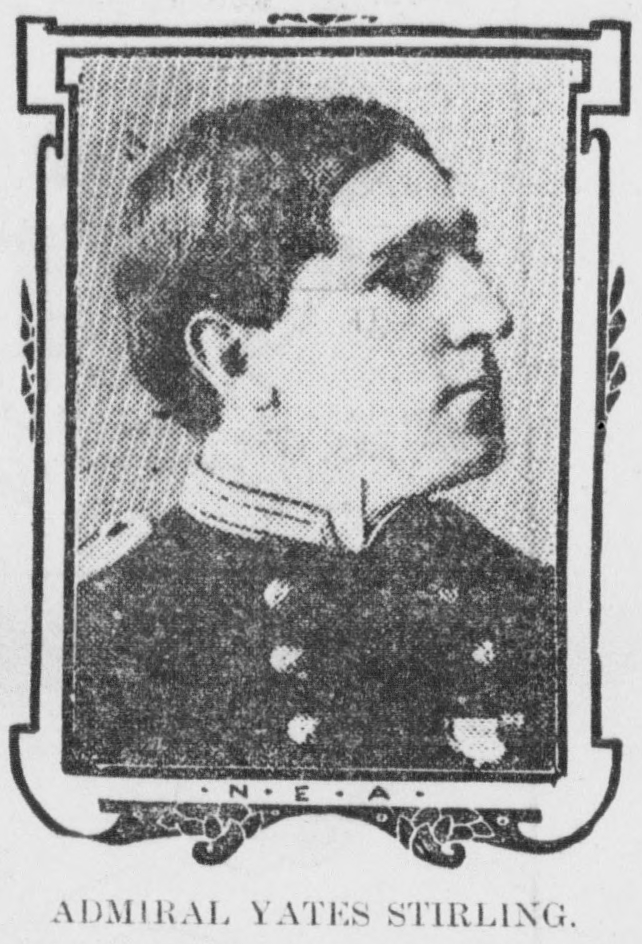
Lieutenant Yates Stirling Jr, about 1904

On 23 February 1900 he joined the USS Celtic (AF-2), and on November 21 of the same year, reported for duty to his father, then a captain and the commandant of the Naval Station, San Juan, Puerto Rico. Following his father's promotion to rear admiral in June 1902, the elder Stirling was named commandant of the Puget Sound Navy Yard, where Yates Jr. joined him shortly thereafter as an officer of the yard. The elder Stirling was commander-in-chief of the United States Asiatic Fleet from 11 July 1904 to 23 March 1905 before retiring from the Navy on 6 May 1905 at the mandatory age of 62. During the time he commanded the Asiatic Fleet, his flag was on the USS Wisconsin (BB-9) and Yates Jr. served as his flag lieutenant. While he was with the Asiatic Fleet, Stirling also had staff duty on the USS Rainbow (AS-7). In mid-April 1905, Stirling, his father and their wives returned to the United States from Yokohama, Japan, aboard the steamship S.S. Korea after the elder Stirling detached from command of the Asiatic Fleet. In 1905–1906, Stirling remained at sea in the USS Massachusetts (BB-2) and later, USS Indiana (BB-1). In the rank of lieutenant commander he reported on October 1, 1906, to the Naval Academy and while on duty there made a cruise on the USS Arkansas (BB-33) in the summer of 1907. Detached from the Naval Academy in June 1908 he next served on the USS Connecticut (BB-18), flagship of Admiral Charles S. Sperry Commander in Chief, Atlantic Fleet as gunnery officer. Stirling joined Connecticut, at San Francisco, where it was then en route as flagship of the Great White Fleet on a global circumnavigation. Following refit at Mare Island Naval Shipyard, the fleet stood out on the next leg of the voyage on 7 July, reaching Hawaii on 16 July. Sailing from Hawaii, the fleet made ports of call at Auckland, New Zealand; Sydney and Melbourne, Australia; Manila, Philippines; Yokohama, Japan; Colombo, Ceylon; arriving at Suez, Egypt, on 3 January 1909.

While the fleet was in Egypt, word was received of a severe earthquake in Sicily that presented an opportunity for the United States to show its friendship to Italy by offering aid to the survivors. Connecticut, Illinois, Culgoa, and Yankton were dispatched to Messina, Italy, at once. Scorpion, the Fleet's station ship at Constantinople, and Celtic, a refrigerator ship fitted out in New York, were hurried to Messina, relieving Connecticut and Illinois, so that they could continue on the cruise. Leaving Messina on 9 January 1909 the fleet stopped at Naples, Italy, thence to Gibraltar, arriving at Hampton Roads on 22 February 1909. There President Roosevelt reviewed the fleet as it passed into the roadstead and delivered an address to Connecticut's officers and crew. Stirling detached from Connecticut in 1910.

The following year, he commanded the Eighth Torpedo Division, Atlantic Torpedo Fleet, his pennant in the USS Paulding (DD-22) which he also commanded as the plank owner captain. In 1911, he was among the first four students to attend the "long course" (16 months) at the Naval War College, Newport, Rhode Island. Promoted to commander in June 1912, after completing the long course he had duty on the staff at the Naval War College. Later in 1912 he joined the USS Rhode Island (BB-17) as executive officer.

=== Submarine Flotilla, Atlantic Fleet and Submarine Base, New London ===
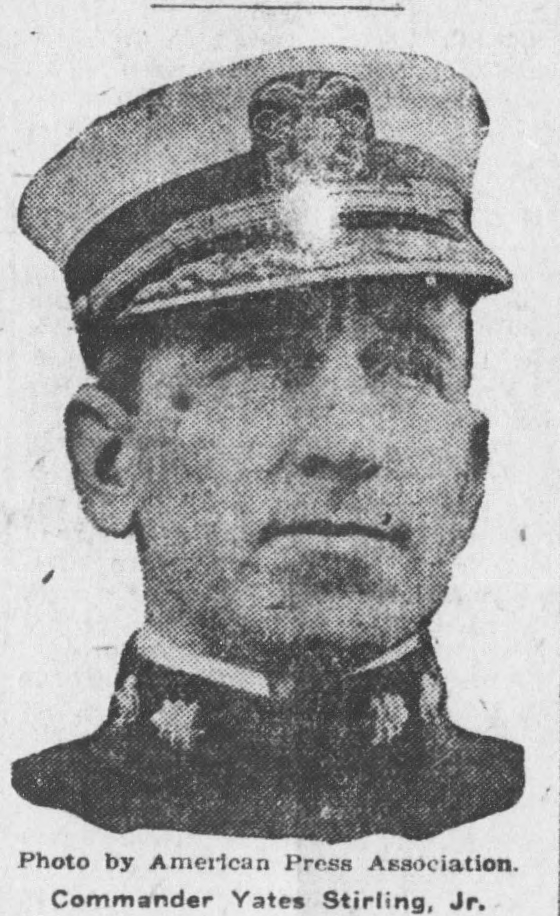
CDR Yates Stirling Jr. about 1916

In 1914, Stirling assumed command of Submarine Flotilla, Atlantic Fleet, attached successively to the USS Ozark (BM-7) and USS Prairie (AD-5). In April 1914, he led a flotilla of torpedo boats into Mexican waters off Veracruz during the Tampico Affair. In April 1915, Stirling along with Assistant Secretary of the Navy Franklin D. Roosevelt and Admiral Bradley A. Fiske appeared before Congress concerning the deplorable condition of the Atlantic submarine fleet. Stirling testified that of the twelve submarines under his command outside of the Canal Zone, only one could get under way when the fleet was mobilized in November 1914 during World War I. From June 1915 until June 1916 he commanded the USS Columbia (C-12) and served additionally as aide on the Staff of Commander Submarine Flotilla, Atlantic. Speaking before private groups, Stirling continued to raise the ire of Secretary of the Navy Josephus Daniels with statements criticizing the inadequate readiness of the Navy, "It is because the Navy has been the "ham bone" of politicians that the United States finds itself so unprepared on the seas. Aside from giving us ships and men we must get action from Congress that will let the Navy conduct its own affairs. We have had to take what they gave us- navy yards where we didn't want them, ships of a type we didn't need. During the last 10 years we have spent more money on our navy than Germany, yet the German navy is twice as large and twice as efficient." Stirling's critical outspokenness prompted the press to speculate, not if but when Daniels would order him court-martialed.

Next assigned as Commander of the newly established Submarine Flotilla, New London, Connecticut, he was also the first commander of the Submarine Base New London and the Submarine School during the period June 1916 until July 1917. In December 1916, "hydro-aeroplanes" were flown from the sub base to test their ability to spot submarines under water. Taking off from the Thames River, Stirling rode along in flights at 1,000' altitude where the fliers were able to spot the boats submerged at depth of 30–40' in the harbor. Stirling had additional duty after the American entry into World War I in April 1917 commanding the USS Chicago (CA-14). During that time, he advocated for and eventually chaired a board on submarine design. Stirling was at ease with the press and had a good relationship with them throughout his long and outspoken public life. He was described by the New York Tribune in July 1917 near the end of his high-profile command of the New London submarine base and flotilla as "a fine specimen of the typical navy officer: tight lipped, kind eyed and keen faced [who] had nothing to say about the plans of the base, though willing to discuss the importance of the submarine." Stirling authored a comprehensive article on the modern history, design, operation, and strategic applications of the submarine and submersible for the United States Naval Institute Proceedings in July 1917. Asserting that "In the past the instruments of sea power have consisted of surface ships. New instruments now exist—the aircraft and the submarine. Air power can be overcome by superior air power. Undersea power can not be overcome by undersea power alone. To destroy this new power—fast surface vessels and aircraft offer the best chance of success," Stirling maintained that, "The submarine is the weapon of the weaker belligerent. It constantly points a dagger at the heart of the stronger fleet; provided it actively enjoys its command of the sea."

=== World War I ===
He then fitted out and assumed command of the USS President Lincoln (1907) at her commissioning on 26 June 1917. Stirling detached from President Lincoln on 12 December 1917 and assumed command of USS Von Steuben (ID-3017), the ex-German raider, SS Kronprinz Wilhelm, on 20 December 1917. He was awarded the Navy Cross for World War I service and cited as follows: "For distinguished service In the line of his profession as Commanding Officer of the USS PRESIDENT LINCOLN and the USS VON STEUBEN, engaged in the important, exacting and hazardous duty of transporting and escorting troops and supplies to European ports through waters infested with enemy submarines and mines."

=== Post-war ===
In March 1919 he was ordered to duty in command of the USS Connecticut and in April of the next year was detached for duty as Captain of the Yard, Navy Yard, Philadelphia. While at Philadelphia, he received his Navy Cross in October 1920 that had been awarded him the previous year. In a 1921 letter to the Secretary of the Navy, during angry disagreements over technical flaws in the diesel systems supplied by Electric Boat, Stirling forcefully pointed out numerous design and reliability problems of the boats then in service, especially the new 800-ton S class. His comments sparked a tumultuous strategy, mission, and design debate that lasted for another decade, coming to a climax between 1928 and 1930 when then Commander Thomas Withers Jr., commanding officer of Submarine Division Four, called repeatedly for an offensive strategy and solo tactics similar to those employed by the Imperial German Navy during World War I.

He remained at Philadelphia for two years, then served from June 1922 until June 1924 as commanding officer of the battleship USS New Mexico (BB-40), Battleship Division 5, Battle Fleet, based at San Pedro, California. That month Stirling was appointed chairman of the Naval Board of Inquiry into the No. 2 turret explosion of the New Mexico's sister ship, USS Mississippi (BB-41), on June 12, 1924, that killed 48 men.

On July 20, 1924, he became Captain of the Yard, Navy Yard, Washington, D.C., with additional duty as assistant superintendent of the Naval Gun Factory. He was promoted to rear admiral on October 6, 1926, and in December that year Stirling was designated chief of staff to Admiral Charles F. Hughes, commander in chief, U.S. Fleet, based at San Pedro, California. At the October 27, 1927 Navy Day Ceremonies at San Pedro harbor, despite an all-day downpour, thousands of Southern Californians gathered for the festivities, including ships' tours, band performances of patriotic music and the key-note address given by Stirling, "Merchant Marine, the Navy and the Nation".

=== Yangtze Patrol ===
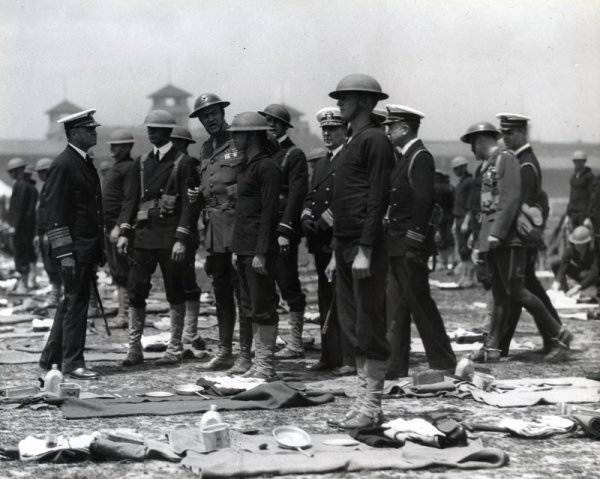
ADM Mark. L. Bristol (left), Asiatic Fleet Commander, RADM Stirling, Yangtze Patrol Commander (center) and Commander of the 4th Marine Regiment, COL Henry C. Davis, U.S.M.C. inspect the fleet landing force in 1928 at the race track, Shanghai, on the Yangtze River delta.

Sterling relieved RADM Henry H. Hough, as commander of the Asiatic Fleet's storied Yangtze Patrol on December 2, 1927. The Patrol, formally organized in December 1919 as a U.S. Naval unit with its first commander, CAPT Thomas A. Kearney, had a legacy dating back to the mid-19th century. Then it had been the fanquei (foreign devils') warships against Imperial Peking. Following the fifteen-year Taiping Rebellion, bandits proliferated on the Yangtze until Peking finally restored order. With the abdication of the last Chinese Emperor, Puyi, following the October 1911 Wuchang Uprising, disorder would prevail on the river during the nearly two decades that the provincial warlords maintained power, unchecked but for the gunboat diplomacy primarily maintained by the American and British gunboats that operated cooperatively in protecting each other's interests.

In 1921, the Yangtze Patrol's command billet was upgraded to a rear admiral and it came under the operational control of the Asiatic Fleet. The Navy Department proclaimed that, "The mission of the Navy on the Yangtze River is to protect United States interests, lives and property, and to maintain and improve friendly relations with the Chinese people." The ships comprising the Patrol were the USS Isabel (flagship) and five gunboats, based at Hankou, 700 miles from the mouth of the river. The Yangtze River, the main artery of China, was then navigable for 1,750 miles, floated about 59 per cent of China's commerce, and reached over 50 per cent of its population of 159,000,000. In 1920 the United States exports to China were valued at $119,000,000 and imports from there at $227,000,000. At least half of this, and probably more, were handled via the Yangtze River. As the Navy's Annual Report stated, "Considering the perpetual banditry, piracy, and revolutionary conditions obtaining in this area, without the protection of our Navy this commerce would be practically nonexistent."

The year 1923 was a particularly chaotic one on the Yangtze. By the early 1920s, the Patrol found itself fighting river bandits while maintaining neutrality between the regional warlords that were battling the Nationalist Kuomintang forces and Communist Forces in an ongoing civil war. To accommodate this difficult military balancing act and the increased perils to U.S. citizens and economic interests, in 1925 Congress authorized the construction of six new shallow-draft gunboats. Construction took place in Shanghai at Kiangnan Dock and Engineering Works during 1926–27, with the "new six" launched in 1927–28, and all commissioned by late 1928 during Stirling's time as "COMYANGPAT". These powerful new river gunboats, expressly designed to navigate the treacherous Yangtze and the 250 miles of rapids "upriver" from Yichang (1,000 mi. upriver) to Chongqing, were to replace the three coal-fired Spanish–American War gunboats seized from Spain in the Philippines more than a quarter century earlier. Elcano, Villalobos, and Quiros had been patrolling the Yangtze since 1903; however age and their deeper drafts were proving increasingly problematic. The two gunboats built in the United States for service on the Yangtze, Palos and Monocacy were "obsolete even as they slid down the launching ways in 1914."

All of the new oil-burning, triple-expansion steam engine gunboats were capable of cruising at 15 knots and reaching Chongqing, 1,250 miles upriver from Shanghai, at high water during the summer. Their principal armaments were two (2) high-angle 3" guns fore and aft and eight (8) .30-caliber Lewis machine guns in swivelling bullet proof mounts. The two smallest gunboats, USS Guam and Tutuila with the shallowest draft, could reach Chongqing year-round, including the winter when the river depth decreased by as much as thirty feet. During the high-water season, they could reach Xuzhou, 1,500 miles upriver. USS Luzon and Mindanao were the largest and USS Oahu and Panay were next in size. These vessels gave the navy the capability it needed at a critical time of expanding operational needs. Stirling detached from the Yangtze Patrol in April 1929 and upon his return to the United States, was appointed president of the Naval Examining Board, Navy Department, Washington.

=== Fourteenth Naval District, Pearl Harbor, Territory of Hawaii ===
In September 1931 he was designated Commandant, Fourteenth Naval District, with additional duty as Commandant Naval Operating Base, Pearl Harbor, T.H. In 1932, the Massie Trial was conducted in Honolulu, Hawaii. The Hawaiian Islands were at the time part of the 14th Naval District, commanded by Stirling. Stirling's strong belief in the guilt of the five Native Hawaiian men charged with rape and assault of a young naval officer's socially prominent wife was well-known, as was his displeasure at the result of a mistrial. "Our first inclination is to seize the brutes and string them up on the trees," he stated, later tempering his reaction with, "we must give the authorities a chance to carry out the law and not interfere." Later, he defended the actions of those involved in the events that led to the homicide of one of the accused, Joseph Kahahawai. Stirling's public statements concerning the Massie Trial would be impolitic and offensive by current social standards nearly a century later; however, they were mostly supported by the contemporary mainstream media, the Navy and Washington. Admiral William V. Pratt, Chief of Naval Operations, announced that, "American men will not stand for the violation of their women under any circumstances. For this crime they have taken the matter into their own hands repeatedly when they have felt that the law has failed to do justice." In a book review of Stirling's 1939 autobiography, the Oakland Tribune wrote, "One of the most difficult tasks of Admiral Stirling's career arose when, as Commandant in Hawaii, he had to handle the Massie tragedy. The chapter devoted to this case will make unpleasant reading for those who insist that polyracial Oriental Hawaii is fit candidate for Statehood." In the 1986 made-for-television movie about the trial, Blood & Orchids, the name of the character representing Stirling was changed to Glenn Langdon.

=== Third Naval District, New York, New York ===
On June 30, 1933, Stirling became commandant, Third Naval District, Headquarters at New York, New York, and of the Brooklyn Navy Yard, succeeding retiring RADM W. W. Phelps. In an interview following the change of command ceremony, Stirling was asked whether he thought battleships were obsolete, responding, "I would not go so far as that. I do think that battleships have become too expensive, but they are still the greatest offensive and defensive naval weapon. My thought is that an intelligent projectile, like a man-piloted airplane might be better than a projectile from a gun which has to go where it is sent." As to submarines, he commented, "I do think submarines make a battleship feel uncomfortable at sea but submarines and airplanes are still auxiliaries of the battleship." Stirling recalled that his last connection to the Third Naval District was in the closing months of the First World War when he was chief of staff and "trying to put the one-year-old chicken back into its eggshell— that is demobilize". Further demonstrating the characteristic dry-wit and sense of humor that made Stirling a favorite of the press of his day, after reporters had been admitted to his quarters by his aide, Commander Bruce Ware, the new commandant glanced at the varied assortment of naval pictures adorning the walls and laughingly described it as "the chamber of horrors". Stirling declined to comment on his future plans for the Brooklyn Naval Yard and when questioned about the highly publicized events of his just completed command of the Fourteenth Naval District at Hawaii, said that it was "a closed book".

Although Stirling's three years as commandant of the Third Naval District and the Brooklyn Navy Yard were during the depths of the Great Depression, under his command the facility saw increased production and workforce. The heavy cruiser USS New Orleans (CA-32) was commissioned in February 1934, the destroyer USS Dale (DD-353) and gunboat USS Erie (PG-50) were both built and commissioned along with a few Coast Guard cutters. Construction began on the light cruisers USS Brooklyn (CL-40) and USS Honolulu (CL-48). While he was commandant at New York, Stirling's official duties saw him frequently receiving foreign dignitaries, including Air Marshall Italo Balbo during the famed Italian aviator's widely covered 1933 trans-Atlantic crossing with twenty-four Savoia-Marchetti S.55 seaplanes for the Chicago Century of Progress. When Balbo's air armada stopped at New York City on the first leg of its return flight to Rome in July 1933, Stirling's admiral's barge met Balbo's plane when it landed in Jamaica Bay off Floyd Bennett Field. Stirling and his Army counterpart, Major General Dennis E. Nolan, commanding general of Second Corps Area, in charge of army units and facilities in New York, New Jersey, Delaware and Puerto Rico, accompanied Balbo's police escort motorcade to the Mayflower Hotel. Stirling had requested an allowance from the Navy Department for the purpose of hosting a dinner for Balbo on his first night in New York. Receiving only $50 from Washington, the socially-connected and popular Stirling was undeterred. "Through the support of men of means who were Navy admirers, I gave to General Balbo and his officers a most elaborate dinner at the Columbian Yacht Club on the Hudson River, now demolished in the development of the Park project. How such a dinner could be given, with over a hundred guests and champagne flowing freely, on the small voucher that I signed, would be no mystery when the guest list is read. Among them were Vincent Astor, Grover Whalen, Ellery W. Stone, E. J. Sadler, and W. S. Farish, all public spirited citizens and some of them members of the Naval Reserve. It has always been difficult for the services to interest Congress in the advantage of appropriating sufficient funds for official entertaining. Balbo enjoyed himself at the dinner, and we were all glad to have such an intimate view of him and his daring men. I regretted that I did not speak Italian or he English, but there was a fellowship developed that evening between the Italian flyers and our other guests, in spite of the handicap of language. I was surprised months later to receive from the great Mussolini the decoration of the Crown of Italy. It was in recognition of the Navy's help to Balbo and his airplanes while in New York."

Stirling retired on May 1, 1936, when he was transferred to the Navy Retired List, having reached the statutory retirement age of 64. He and Major General Dennis E. Nolan had been born eight days apart and faced mandatory service retirement at the same time. The two retiring two-star flag officers, who had frequently appeared together during their respective last commands, were jointly honored with a retirement banquet at the Hotel St. George by naval, military and New York society, led by President Franklin Delano Roosevelt's mother, Sara Roosevelt, who posed for photos arm in arm with both men and declared, "I am very fond of and have the highest regard and admiration for both of the honored guests"

== Post Naval career ==
Admiral Stirling, self-styled "stormy petrel" of the Naval Service, devoted his energies after retirement to writing books, newspaper articles and lecturing. Outspoken and critical of naval policies and procedures as well as U. S. international policies, he had long urged a two-ocean Navy second to none. He published a controversial anti-Soviet article in 1935 while still on active duty that evoked a proclamation from the Secretary of the Navy that active duty naval officers were not to speak out on international policy. He urged U.S. intervention against Germany in 1939 and failing to interest the country, pleaded that the American people at least pray for a British-French victory. Speaking before the national convention of the Veterans of Foreign Wars in Philadelphia that year, Stirling warned that "the framing of neutrality laws to keep us out of war—without taking into consideration the terrible result to us of a dictatorial victory—is like 'whistling in the dark' or 'fiddling while Rome is burning. There is but one way to keep us out of war; for the war not to happen. Therefore, as an important organ of this complicated world, we should, instead of keeping out of foreign disputes that will threaten our security and prosperity, go into them with both feet. The present neutrality law, placing an embargo on arms to nations at war, surely will cause us great economic pains—if not complete disaster to our entire industrial structure; for in the next war we shall find that all goods and supplies will be declared contraband by all belligerents." When Benito Mussolini's Italian air force attacked and bombed Haifa, in the British mandate of Palestine in July 1940, destroying oil refineries and storage tanks, Stirling penned an article which drew national attention in which he proclaimed that "all the high cards" in the Mediterranean are in the hands of "Italian air power". Just two days after the Japanese attack on Pearl Harbor, Stirling wrote a prescient article wherein he laid out eight predicted Japanese strategic goals and concluded ultimate Japanese defeat, "To this naval observer, intimately familiar with the whole pattern of events in the Pacific—military, political and economic—for many years, the Japanese action appears suicidal. ... We may be in for a long and hard war, but the Japanese can not win. We are likely to suffer initial reverses but for them we will obtain a terrible vengeance."

During World War II, Stirling penned scores of articles as a syndicated columnist expressing his opinions on war-time strategies and tactics, under the byline, "United Press Naval Critic" or "United Press Naval Analyst". In 1942, he advocated building a fleet of small, wooden, V-bottom, 30–60' long craft, capable of 30 knots, with two machine guns and six depth charge racks, manned by 3 to 7 men, to patrol the 35,000 miles of U.S. coastline and protect shipping. When Stirling sought to return to active duty in 1944, Secretary of the Navy James Forrestal wrote back that there was no post available "suitable to your rank and attainments". Yates Stirling's last book, touting the strategic importance of his beloved Navy, "Why Sea Power Will Win the War", was published in 1944.

== Personal life ==
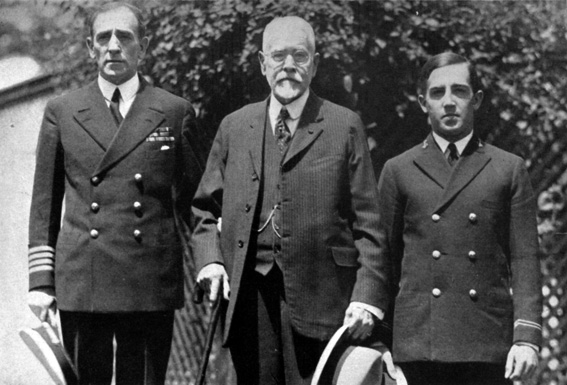
CAPT Yates Stirling Jr.; RADM Yates Stirling Sr.; MIDN Yates Stirling III, about 1925

Stirling married the former Adelaide Egbert, daughter of Brigadier General Harry C. Egbert, in 1903 when he was 31. They had five children, two boys and three girls. His eldest son, Yates Stirling III became a captain in the Navy. His younger son, Harry, also served in the Navy and attained the rank of commander.

RADM Stirling was a hereditary companion of the California Commandery of the Military Order of the Loyal Legion of the United States by right of his father's service in the American Civil War having been elected to membership while an ensign in 1899.

== Death ==
Rear Admiral Stirling died in his sleep on January 27, 1948, after three months' illness in Baltimore, Maryland, his home for many years, and was buried at Arlington National Cemetery. He and his wife had two sons, Captain Yates Stirling III, USN (Ret.) of Norfolk, Virginia, and Commander Harry E. Stirling USN; and three daughters, Katharine (Mrs. William R. Ilk) of Los Angeles, California, and Misses Ellen and Adelaide Stirling of Baltimore.

== Dates of rank ==
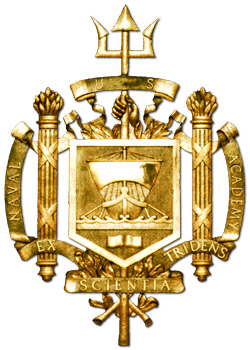
United States Naval Academy Passed Naval Cadet – June 3, 1892

Ensign	Lieutenant Junior Grade	Lieutenant	Lieutenant Commander
O-1	O-2	O-3	O-4
July 1, 1894	March 3, 1899	October 24, 1900	July 1, 1906

Commander	Captain	Commodore	Rear Admiral
O-5	O-6	O-7	O-8
June 7, 1912	August 10, 1917	Never Held	October 6, 1926

- Commodore – no longer a rank in the United States Navy, was previously reserved for wartime use and was not in use at the time of Stirling's promotion to Flag Rank in 1926. Currently, a captain who is promoted to pay grade O-7 becomes a Rear Admiral (Lower Half) and uses the abbreviated rank designation RDML as opposed to RADM, which designates a Rear Admiral (Upper Half), O-8.
- Stirling was promoted to rear admiral "lower half" in December 1926, with date of rank October 6, 1926. He was advanced to rear admiral (upper half) on 1 June 1931.

== Decorations ==
Rear Admiral Yates Stirling Jr. was awarded these decorations and service awards:

1st Row	Navy Cross	Sampson Medal (USS Dolphin)	Navy Spanish Campaign Medal
2nd Row	Philippine Campaign Medal	Mexican Service Medal	World War I Victory Medal with Transport clasp
3rd Row	French Legion of Honour, Grade Officer	Venezuela Order of the Liberator, Grade Commander	Order of the Crown of Italy, Grade Commander

== Bibliography ==
- Aubin, J. Harris (1906) Register of the Military Order of the Loyal Legion, Boston, Press of Edwin L. Slocomb.
- Hamersly, Lewis Randolph. (1902). The Records of Living Officers of the U.S. Navy and Marine Corps, Seventh Edition, New York: L. R. Hamersly Company.
- Meekins, Lynn R. (1910). Men of Mark in Maryland. Biographies of Leading Men of the State, v. 2. Baltimore, Washington & Richmond: B.F. Johnson.▸online, complete
- Peyser, Marc (2015). Hissing Cousins: the Untold Story of Eleanor Roosevelt and Alice Roosevelt. Knopf Doubleday. ISBN 9780385536011.▸ online, partial
- Stirling Jr., Yates (1939). Sea Duty: The Memoirs of a Fighting Admiral. New York, NY: G. P. Putnam's Sons. ISBN 978-1-432-62796-6. OCLC 175234490. ▸ online, complete
- Tolley, Kemp (2000). Yangtze Patrol: The U.S. Navy in China. Annapolis, MD: Bluejacket Books, Naval Institute Press. ISBN 978-0-87021-798-2.
- Weir, Gary (2000). Building American Submarines 1914–1940. University Press of the Pacific. ISBN 0-89875-066-0.▸ online, partial
