= USS Celtic =

USS Celtic may refer to two ships of the United States Navy named for or pertaining to the Celts or their language.

- USS Celtic (AF-2), built in 1891 by Workman, Clark and Company, Belfast, Ireland, as Celtic King; purchased by the U.S. Navy on 14 May 1898
- USS Celtic (IX-137), built in 1921 as Java Arrow by Bethlehem Shipbuilding in Quincy, Massachusetts; acquired by the U.S. Navy 17 January 1944
