= Celt (disambiguation) =

The Celts were Iron Age inhabitants of Europe.

Celt, Celts or Celtae may also refer to:

== Language and ethnicity ==
- Celts (modern)
- Celtic languages
- Celtic nations
- Names of the Celts

== Arts and entertainment ==
- The Celts (1987 TV series), a 1987 BBC documentary series
- The Celts (2000 TV series), a 2000 S4C documentary series
- "The Celts" (song), by Enya, 1987
  - The Celts (album), a 1992 re-release of Enya
- Celtae (band), a Canadian band formed in 2001
- The Celts: First Masters of Europe, a 1992 illustrated book by Christiane Éluère

== Other uses ==
- Celt (tool), in archaeology
- Celt, Missouri, a place in the U.S.
- Rattleback, or (rebellious) celt, a semi-ellipsoidal top
- SS Gothenburg, later RMS Celt, a 19th-century steamship
- Cincinnati Celts, an American football team
- California Extremely Large Telescope, a proposed telescope
- CELT, an audio compression format
- Corpus of Electronic Texts, an online database of Irish texts

== See also ==
- Celtic (disambiguation)
- Gaels
- Insular art
