= MV Celtic =

British sailing barge

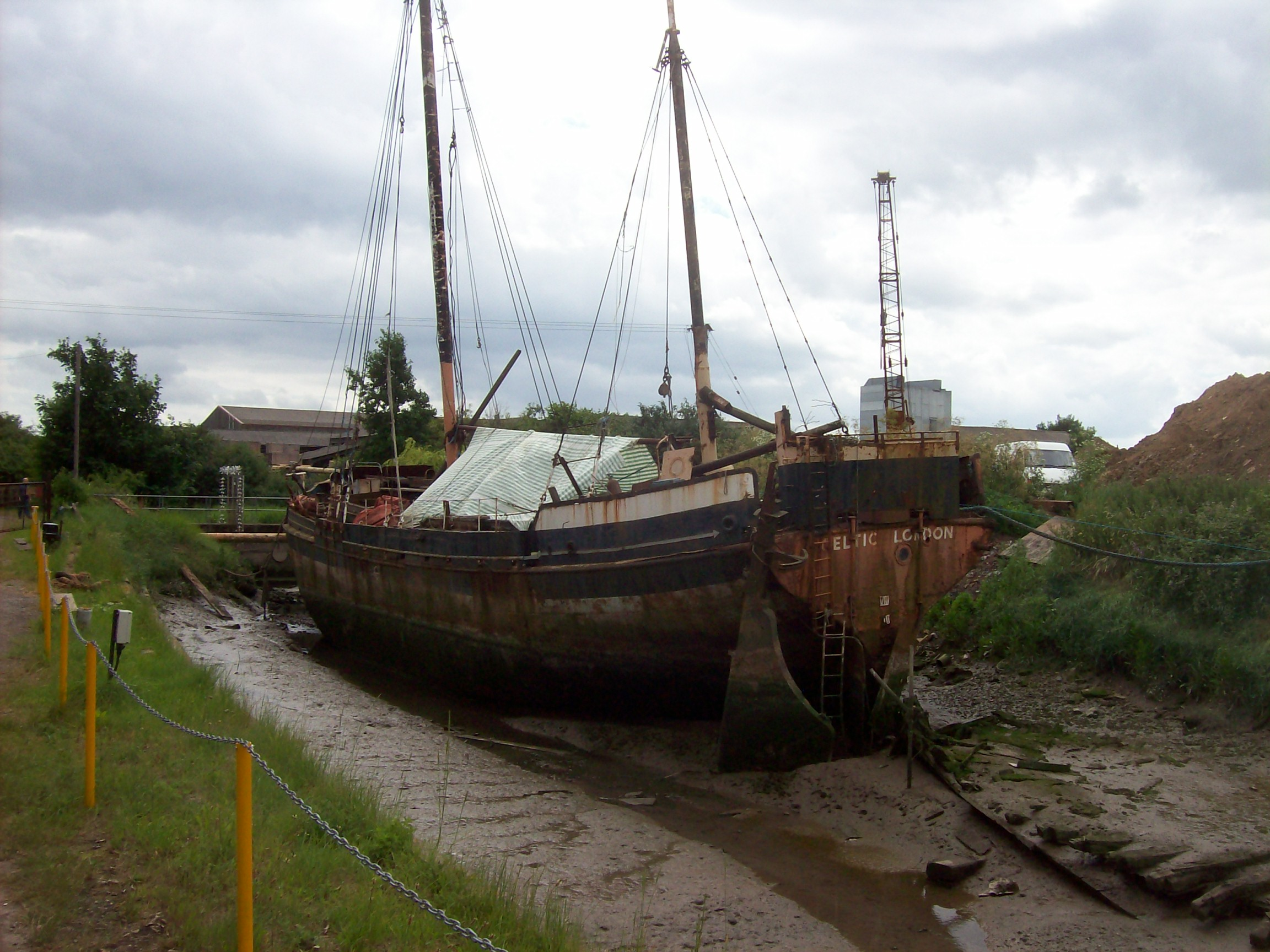

History

United Kingdom
- Name: Celtic
- Port of registry: London
- Builder: Kievits & Van Reede, Papendrecht, Netherlands
- Launched: 1903
- Identification: UK official number 118314; code Letters JGMC (until 1933); call sign MKFZ (by 1934)
- Status: Under restoration

General characteristics
- Class & type: Sailing barge, later coaster
- Tonnage: 148 GRT
- Length: 90 ft (27.43 m)
- Beam: 23 ft 2 in (7.06 m)
- Depth: 9 ft (2.74 m)

MV Celtic is a former Thames sailing barge which was built by Kievits & Van Reede in Papendrecht, Netherlands in 1903 for E J & W Goldsmith Ltd of London and Grays, Essex. She is currently under restoration at Sittingbourne, Kent.

== History ==
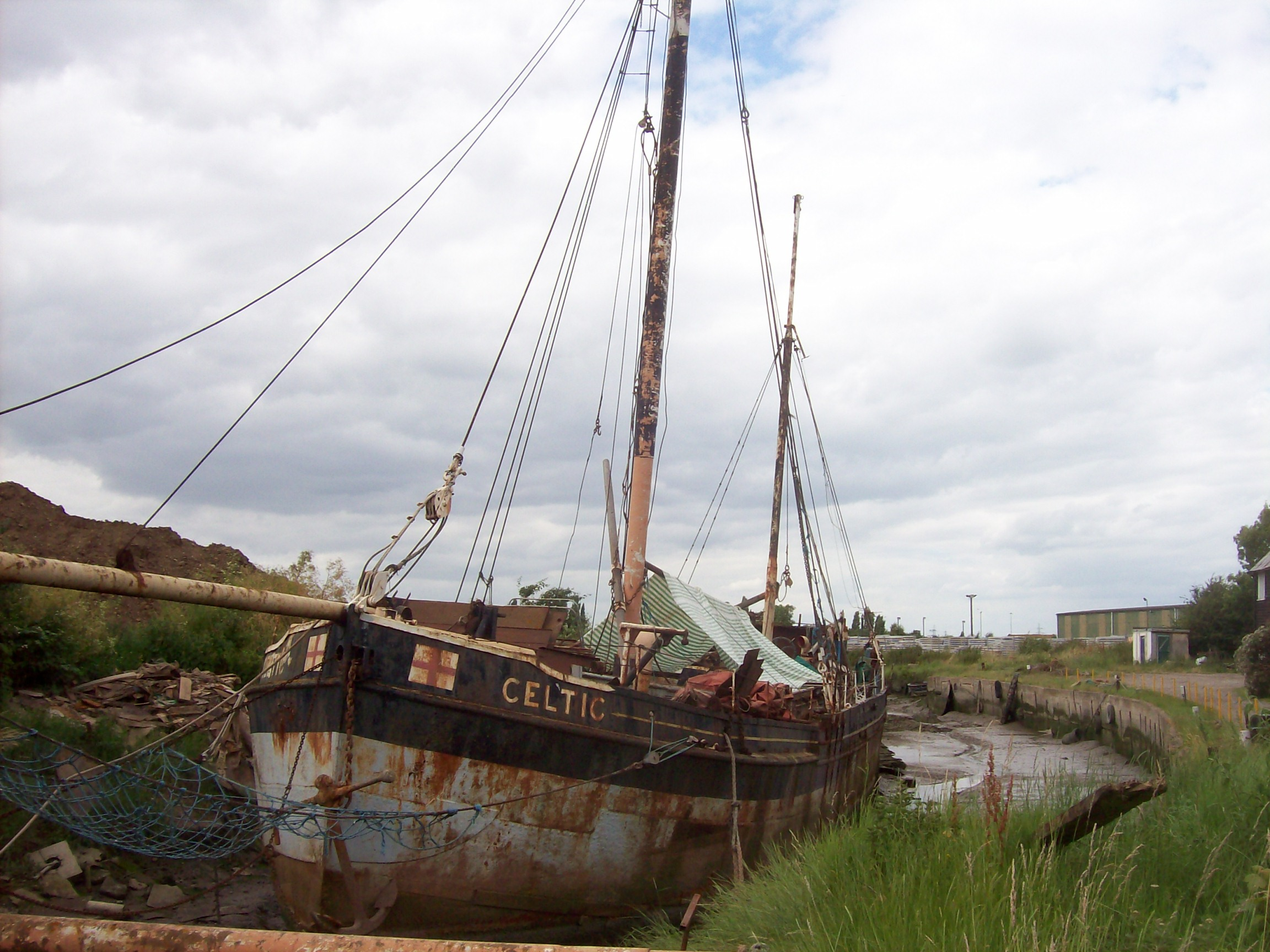
Celtic under restoration at Sittingbourne, Kent

Celtic was built with a steel hull and was spritsail-rigged. She was used to trade around the coast of Kent and Essex, and the Thames Estuary, mostly in the brickmaking and papermaking trades, and was operated by E J & W Goldsmith for 38 years.

In 1941 she was requisitioned for war service, passing into ownership of the Ministry of War Transport, under the management of the London & Rochester Trading Co Ltd, and at that time was fitted with twin screws a pair of Bergius diesel engines. She was used as a barrage balloon base at Portsmouth, later serving as a parent vessel in Chichester harbour during January 1943. She saw further service in Scotland after this with Detachment Celtic; part of the RMBPD

Postwar, Celtic returned to commercial service in the ownership of Vectis Shipping and, later, Alfred Horatio Sheaf, both of Newport, Isle of Wight. She was mainly in the cement trade, working between Asham Cement Works on the River Ouse and the Isle of Wight. In 1967 the cement works closed, and she then worked between the Isle of Wight and Shoreham by Sea or Greenhithe and was laid up at Newport in 1969. She finally ended her days working in the ballast trade in the Thames area.

== Official number and code letters ==
Celtic's UK official number was 118314, and until 1933 her code letters were JGMC. By 1934, her call sign was MKFZ.
