= SS Celtic =

SS Celtic was the name of a number of ships.

- SS Celtic (1872), launched in 1872, serving with the White Star Line.
- RMS Celtic (1901), which would have been known as SS Celtic when not carrying mail.
