= Celticism =

Celticism may refer to:

- A word or linguistic property adapted from a Celtic language
  - List of English words of Celtic origin
  - List of English words of Scottish Gaelic origin
  - Irish words used in the English language
  - List of English words of Irish origin
  - List of English words of Welsh origin
  - Hiberno-English
  - Kiltartanese
- Political pan-Celticism
- The ideology of Lega Nord which culturally identifies with the Celtic people
- The romanticist Celtic Revival
- Celts (modern), a modern Celtic identity that has emerged in Western Europe since the 18th century
- Celtism also known as Celtic neopaganism
- Celticisation, the historic process of conquering and assimilating by the ancient Celts
