= Yates Stirling =

Rear Admiral Yates Stirling Sr.
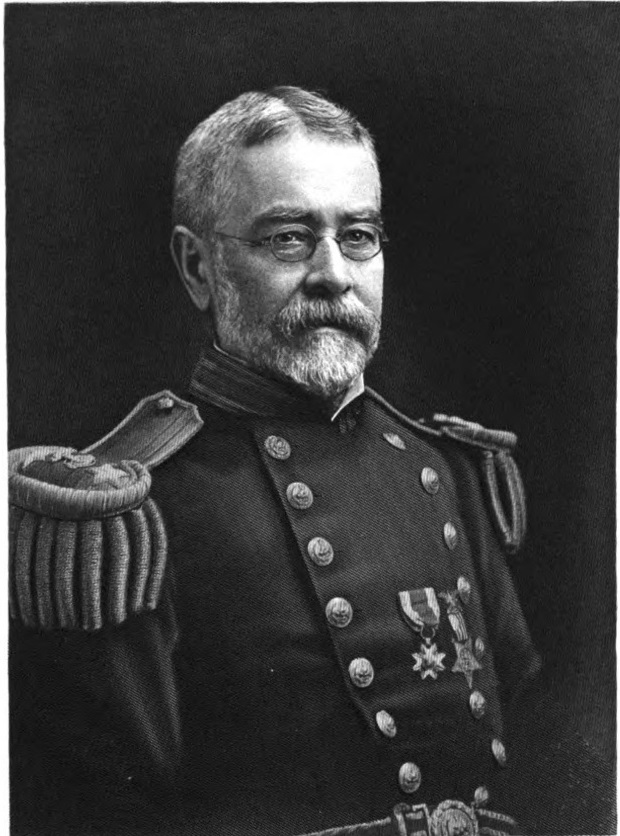
- RADM Yates Stirling Sr.
- Born: May 6, 1843; Baltimore, Maryland, US
- Died: March 5, 1929 (aged 85); Baltimore, Maryland, US
- Burial place: Arlington National Cemetery
- Relatives: Yates Stirling Jr. (son)
- Military career
- Allegiance: United States
- Branch: United States Navy
- Service years: 1863–1905
- Rank: Rear admiral
- Commands: USS Lackawanna; USS Iroquois; Receiving ship USS Dale; USS Dolphin; USS Newark; USS Lancaster; South Atlantic Squadron; Naval Station San Juan; United States Asiatic Fleet
- Conflicts: American Civil War; Union blockade; First Battle of Fort Fisher; Second Battle of Fort Fisher

Yates Stirling (May 6, 1843 – March 5, 1929) was a rear admiral in the United States Navy.

== Birth and personal life ==
Stirling was born in Baltimore, Maryland, on May 6, 1843, the son of Archibald Stirling and the former Elizabeth A. Walsh. He and his wife, Ellen (1843–1929), had seven children. Their elder son, Yates Stirling Jr. (1872–1948), also became a rear admiral in the Navy, making them only the second family in the history of the U.S. Navy to have father and son rear admirals concurrently living. The first were Rear Admirals Thomas O. Selfridge Sr. and Junior. Stirling's younger son, Archibald (1884–1963), was a captain in the Navy.

Stirling was a companion of the Maryland Commandery of the Military Order of the Loyal Legion of the United States as a veteran commissioned officer of the Civil War. He was a grandson of Thomas Yates (1740–1815), captain, Fourth Battalion, Maryland Regulars during the American Revolutionary War.

== Naval career ==
Stirling attended private schools in Baltimore as a youth. He was appointed by Representative Henry Winter Davis of Maryland to the United States Naval Academy at Annapolis, Maryland, as an acting midshipman on September 27, 1860. In June 1861, Stirling and several other midshipman, including Robley "Fighting Bob" Evans, future hero of the Spanish–American War, submitted letters of resignation, believing their loyalty was with the Confederacy. Four weeks later they had second thoughts and retracted their resignations, expressing loyalty to the Union. When the rank of acting midshipman was abolished on July 16, 1862, his rank became midshipman. After the American Civil War broke out in April 1861, the academy moved to Newport, Rhode Island, for the duration of the war and Stirling graduated one year ahead of schedule in 1863 due to the expanded U.S. Navy's need for officers during the war. He was commissioned as an ensign on May 28, 1863.

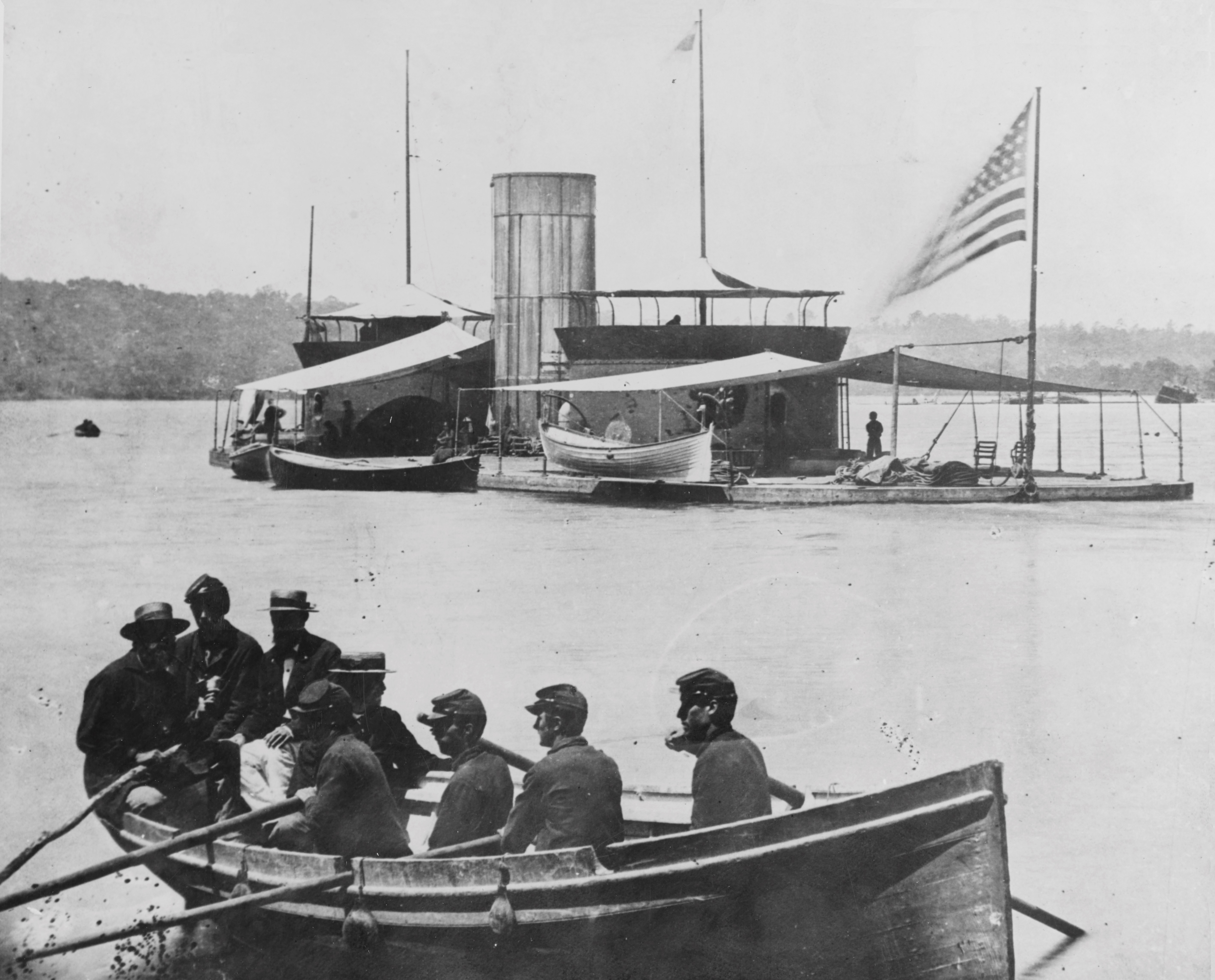
USS Onondaga on the James River, 1864–65, with Union soldiers in the foreground

Stirling served for the rest of the war in the North Atlantic Blockading Squadron as part of the Union Blockade of the Confederate States of America. His first duty was aboard the screw sloop-of-war USS Shenandoah until April 13, 1864, when Shenandoah began a period under repair in Philadelphia, Pennsylvania. He then served aboard the flagship of the North Atlantic Blockading Squadron, the monitor USS Onondaga, on the James River in Virginia until reporting back aboard Shenandoah for duty when she returned to service in June 1864. Aboard Shenandoah he saw combat at Fort Fisher in North Carolina in both the First Battle of Fort Fisher in December 1864 and the Second Battle of Fort Fisher in January 1865 and remained on blockade duty through the end of the war in April 1865.

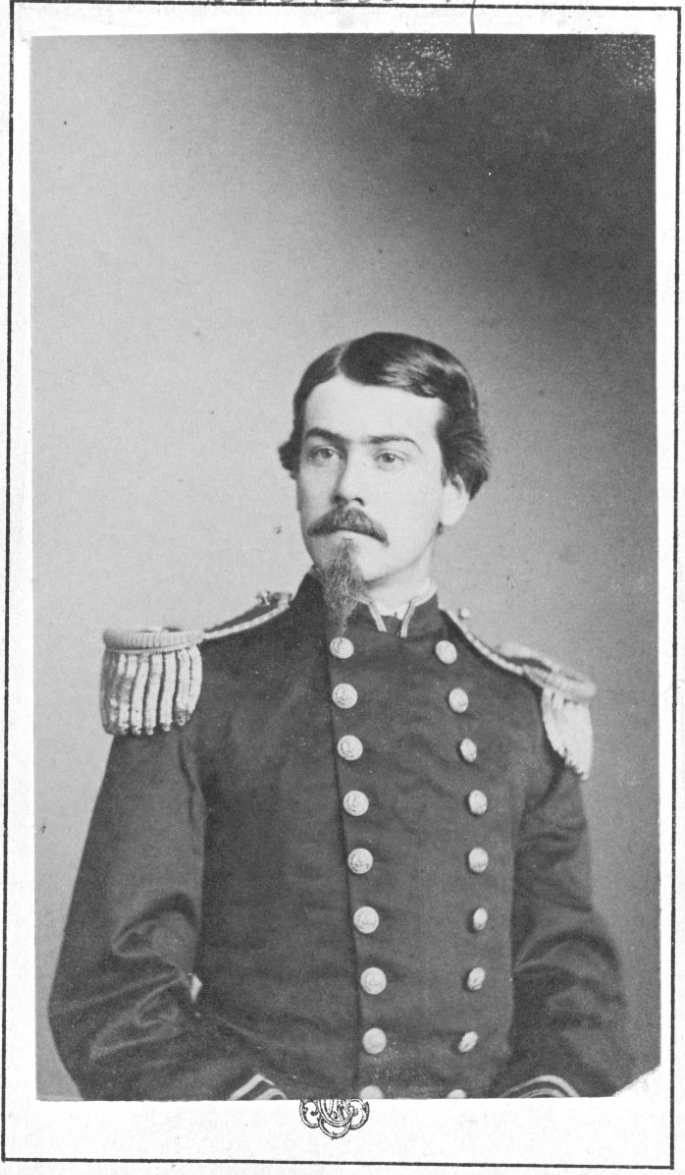
LCDR Yates Stirling, taken in 1868

After the war, Stirling served aboard the gunboat USS Mohongo in the Pacific Squadron from 1865 to 1867 and was promoted to lieutenant on November 10, 1866. Promoted to lieutenant commander on March 12, 1868, he was aboard the newly commissioned screw frigate USS Wampanoag during her brief initial deployment as flagship of the North Atlantic Squadron in 1868. He then served aboard the next flagship of the squadron, the screw sloop-of-war USS Contoocook, from 1868 to 1869 before a tour aboard the receiving ship USS Independence at the Mare Island Navy Yard at Vallejo, California, from 1871 to 1872. While stationed at Mare Island, his son and namesake, Yates Jr. was born on April 30, 1872.

After a lengthy period on sick leave from 1873 to 1875, Stirling returned to duty aboard the receiving ship USS Worcester at the Norfolk Navy Yard in Portsmouth, Virginia, from 1875 to 1876. He had torpedo duty in 1877, then had ordnance duty at the Washington Navy Yard in Washington, D.C., from 1877 to 1879.

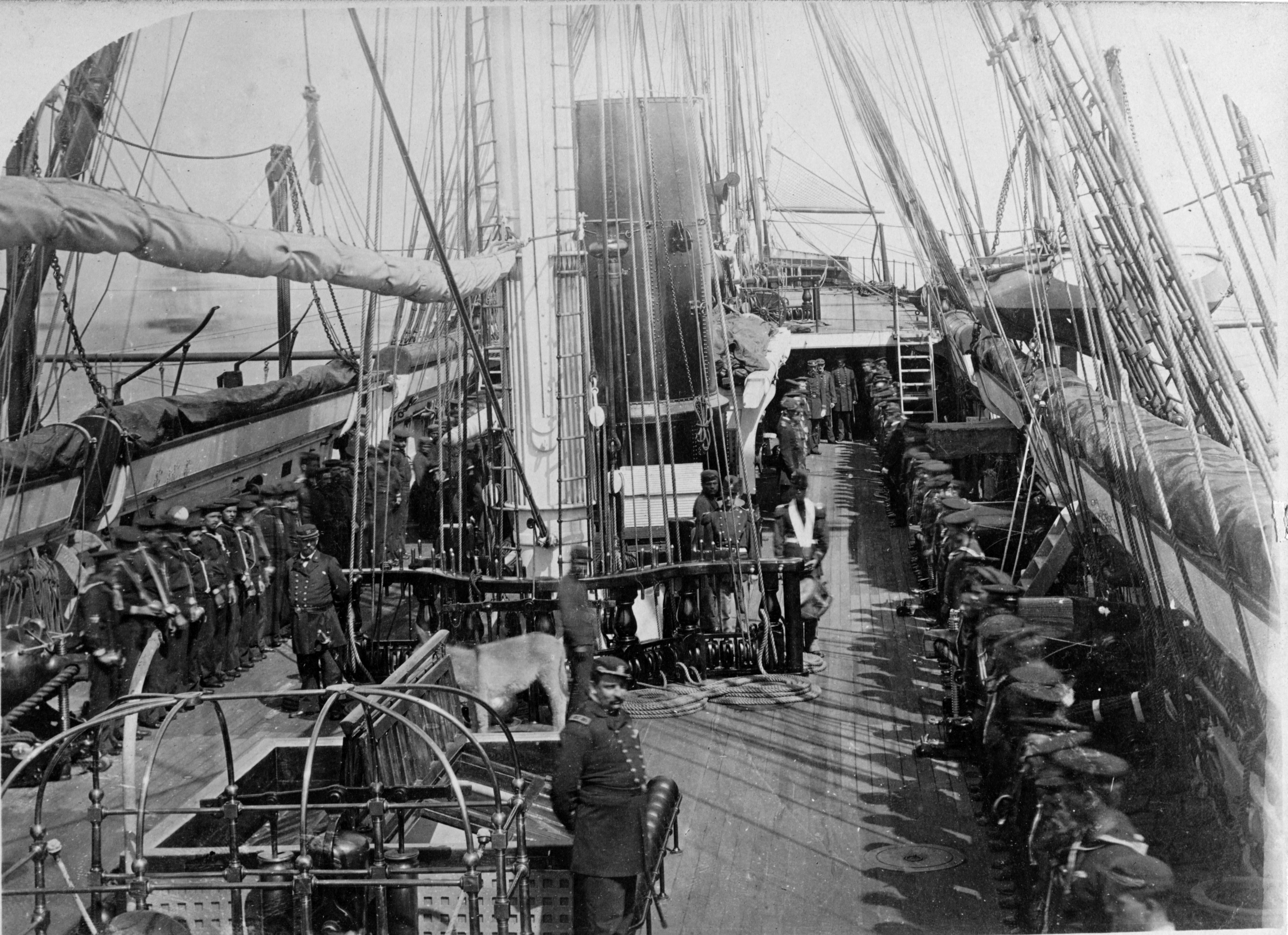
USS Lackawanna, crew at quarters for inspection, circa September 1880 to September 1881

Stirling returned to sea in 1878 as commanding officer of the screw sloop-of-war USS Lackawanna in the Pacific Squadron and was promoted to commander on November 26, 1880, during his tour aboard Lackawanna. Detaching from Lackawanna in 1881, he had a second tour of duty at the Washington Navy Yard from 1882 to 1884 before a sea assignment as commanding officer of the sloop-of-war USS Iroquois in the Pacific Squadron from 1884 to 1886. He then commanded the receiving ship USS Dale at the Washington Navy Yard from 1887 to 1890 and the gunboat and dispatch vessel USS Dolphin from March 1890 to June 1891.

Stirling had duty as a lighthouse inspector from December 1892 to December 1894 and was promoted to captain on September 16, 1894. He awaited orders from December 1894 until May 1895, then was commanding officer of the protected cruiser USS Newark from May 1895 to July 1896 and of the screw sloop-of-war USS Lancaster from July 1896 to June 1897. He was commander of the South Atlantic Squadron from July to December 1897. After duty as a member of the Lighthouse Board from March 31, 1898, to July 1, 1900, he became commandant of Naval Station San Juan in San Juan, Puerto Rico, on November 21, 1900, serving in that capacity into 1902. In May 1900, while commandant at San Juan, Captain Stirling rescued the Lloyd's agent there, a man named Butler who had jumped off the municipal pier that had caught fire. Stirling was promoted to rear admiral on June 8, 1902. Following his promotion, he was named commandant of the Puget Sound Navy Yard, where his son, Yates Jr. joined him shortly thereafter as an officer of the yard.

Stirling was commander-in-chief of the United States Asiatic Fleet from July 11, 1904, to March 23, 1905 before retiring from the Navy on May 6, 1905, at the mandatory age of 62. During the time he commanded the Asiatic Fleet, his flag was on the USS Wisconsin (BB-9) and his son, Yates Jr. served as his flag lieutenant. When he was interviewed shortly after his retirement, Stirling recalled an incident early in his career when he was first lieutenant taking a ship into a New England harbor with some difficulty. An old lobsterman in a dory piled high with traps managed to interfere with the ship's passage. After Stirling called down to the lobsterman with some "choice deep sea language", the old man leisurely rested on his oars and replied, "And who be you?" Stirling blustered back, "Who am I? I'm the first officer of this ship." "Well, go to your skipper, then," replied the ancient mariner with dignity. "I don't argue with nobody but my equals an I'm cap'n o' this."

== Death ==
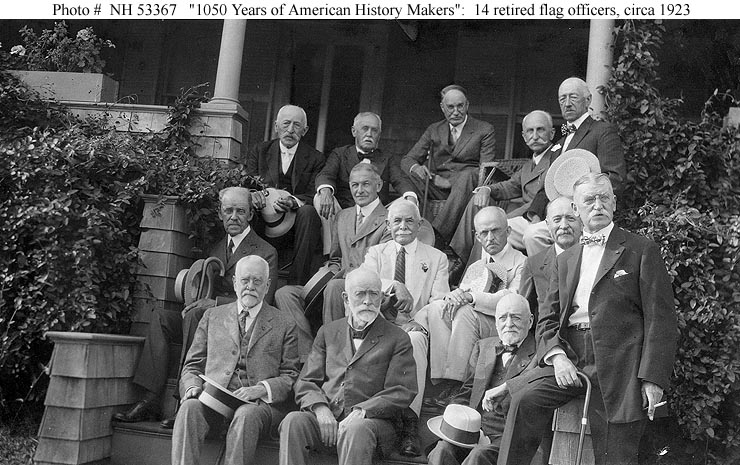
Yates Stirling is in the front row on the left in this photograph of 13 retired United States Navy rear admirals and one retired United States Marine Corps major general taken c. 1923.

Stirling died on March 5, 1929, at his home, 11 East Chase Street, Baltimore, Maryland, survived by this wife, two sons and three daughters. He was 85 years old and had been ill for about five years. He is buried along with his wife at Arlington National Cemetery in Arlington, Virginia.

Admiral Sterling was a member of the Military Order of the Loyal Legion of the United States and the Maryland Society of the Sons of the American Revolution.

== Service medals ==
=== United States awards ===

Civil War Campaign Medal	Spanish Campaign Medal

The original service criteria for the Spanish Campaign Medal promulgated in Navy Department Special Order No. 81 of June 27, 1908, required service on specific vessels and time periods for which Stirling's service during the Spanish–American War did not qualify. However, in the early 1920s, the award criteria were relaxed to provide for award of the medal to all those who served in the U.S. Navy or Marine Corps during the Spanish–American War. The first government contract to supply campaign medals to the expanded recipient base with the Bastian Brothers Company did not occur until 1922.

== Dates of rank ==
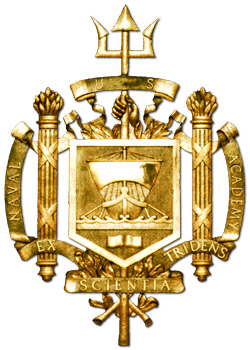
United States Naval Academy Graduated midshipman 1863

Ensign	Lieutenant junior grade	Lieutenant	Lieutenant commander
O-1	O-2	O-3	O-4
May 28, 1863	Never held	November 10, 1866	March 12, 1868

Commander	Captain	Commodore	Rear admiral
O-5	O-6	O-7	O-8
November 26, 1880	September 16, 1894	Never Held	June 8, 1902

- Commodore – no longer a rank in the United States Navy, was previously reserved for wartime use and was not in use at the time of Stirling's promotion to Flag Rank in 1902. Currently, a captain who is promoted to pay grade O-7 becomes a rear admiral (lower half) and uses the abbreviated rank designation RDML as opposed to RADM, which designates a rear admiral (upper half), O-8.
- Stirling was promoted to rear admiral on June 8, 1902.

== Notes ==
Military offices
Preceded by Philip H. Cooper	Commander-in-Chief, United States Asiatic Fleet; 11 July 1904–23 March 1905	Succeeded by William M. Folger
