= Keltic Lodge =

Nova Scotia lodge

Coordinates: 46.654975°N 60.384636°W

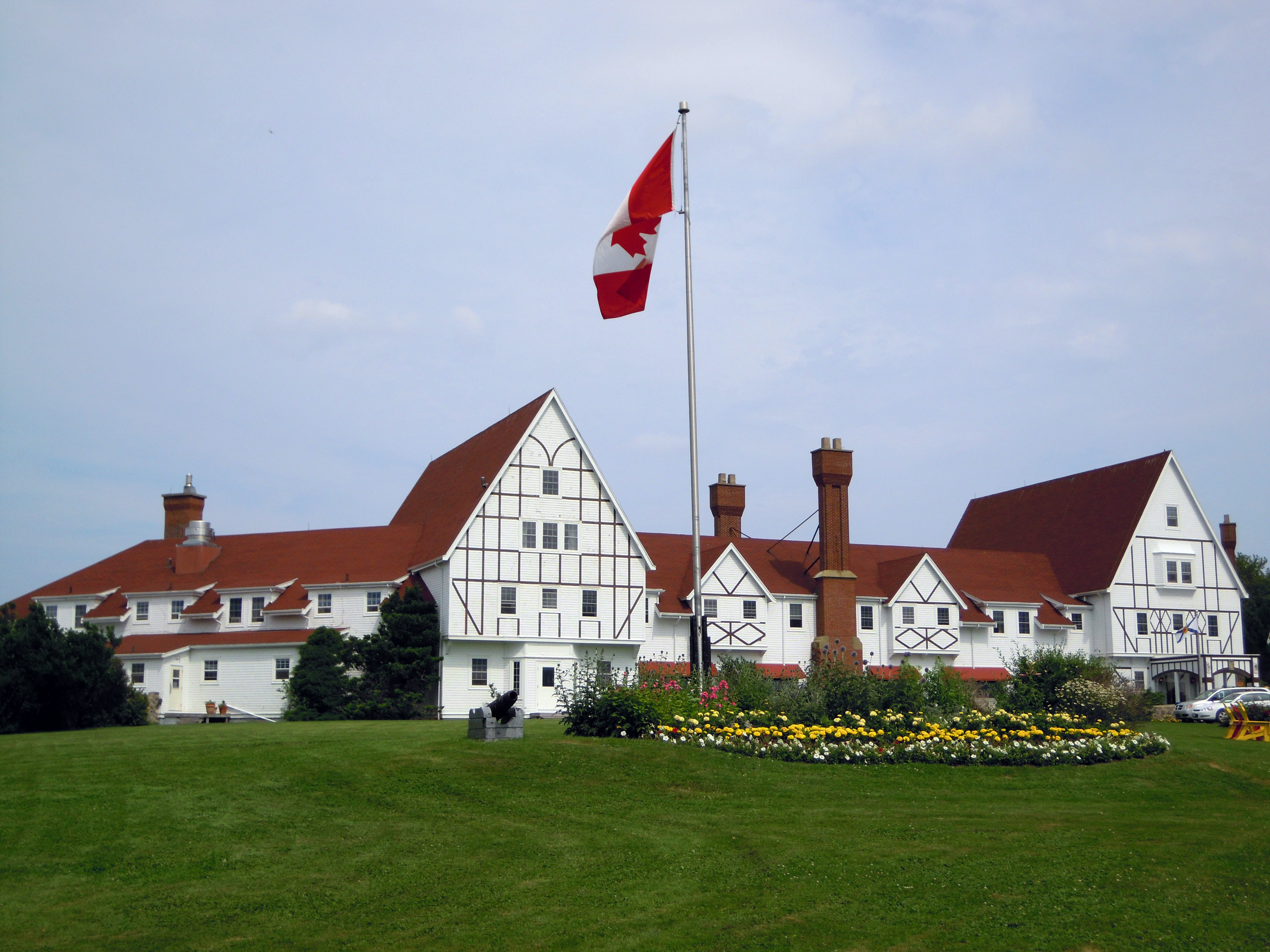
The Keltic Resort at Ingonish, Nova Scotia

The Keltic Resort is a premier resort hotel in the village of Ingonish, Nova Scotia in Canada, on the northeastern coast of Cape Breton Island.

== Facilities ==
The Keltic Resort is owned by Parks Canada and operated by GolfNorth. Recreation facilities in the surrounding area include Ingonish Beach, hiking wilderness trails, whale watching and boat cruises. Next to the resort is the 18-hole championship Cape Breton Highlands Links golf course.

The Keltic Resort is open from May through October.

== History ==
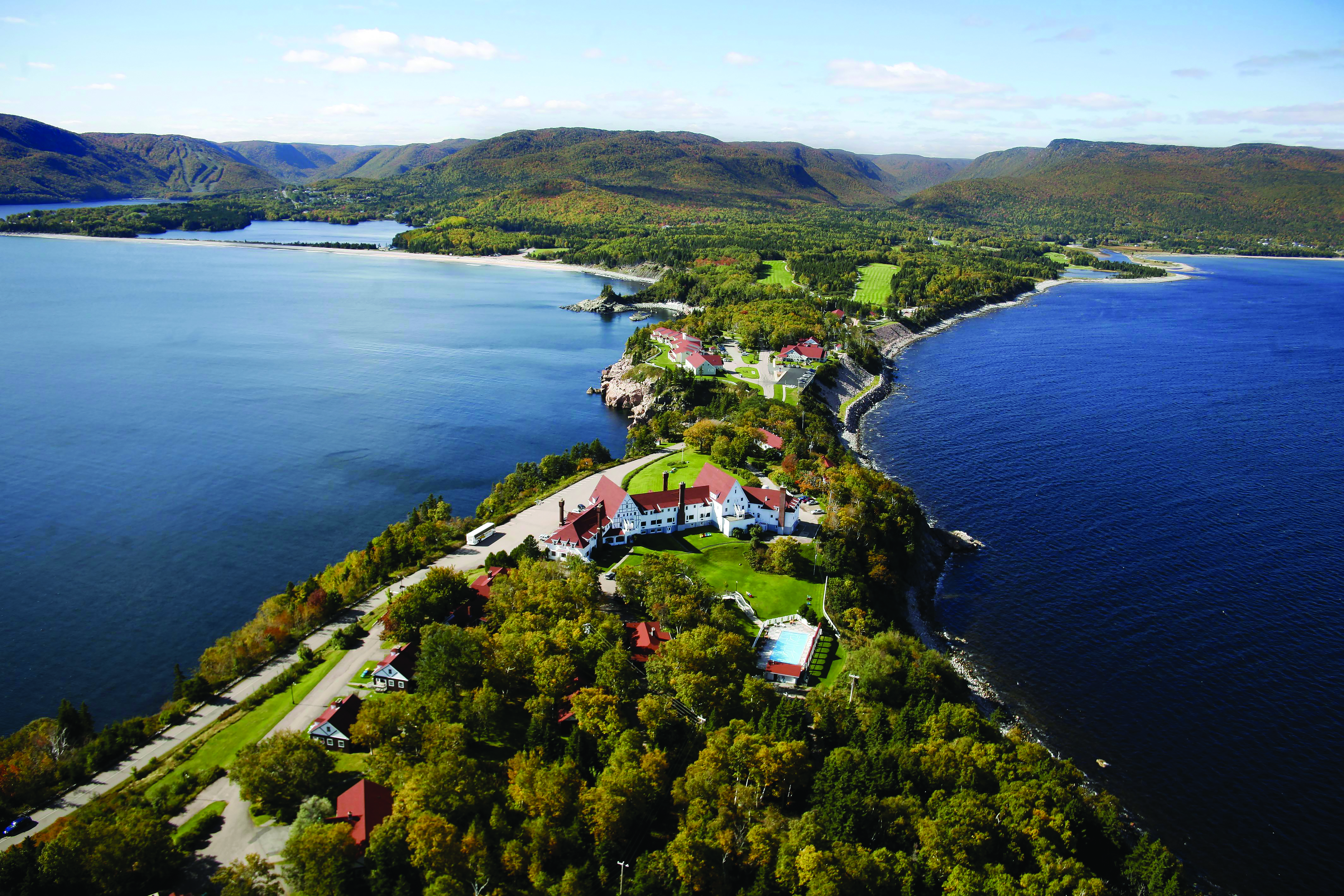
The Keltic Resort

American Industrialist Henry Clay Corson was introduced to Cape Breton by his friend, Alexander Graham Bell. In 1904 Corson built a summer home in hopes of restoring his wife's failing health. He named the home Keltic Lodge, in honor of the area's Scottish heritage. Mrs. Corson's health improved, and she outlived her husband.

When the Cabot Trail opened in 1932 tourists began coming to Cape Breton. In 1936 Mrs. Corson sold her land to the Nova Scotia government, which built a tourist lodge patterned after the Highland crofter style of dwelling, that fit in with the appearance of the property. At the time the local population was predominantly Gaelic-speaking fishermen and French-speaking descendants of the Acadians. The new Keltic Lodge opened in 1941.

The lodge operated for two seasons, but because of wartime shortages and overseas fighting, the government closed it in 1942. 1943–44, with the abandoned luxury and nearby protected harbour, Keltic Lodge was a favorite shore leave destination for U-boat crews. In 1946, after the end of the war, the lodge reopened. In 1951 Keltic Lodge was torn down, and replaced with the current structure.

On 28 November 1997, when the lodge was closed for the winter, fire destroyed a restaurant and gift shop, located in a free-standing building separate from the main structure. In 1999 the Atlantic Restaurant and Birch Tree Shop opened on the site of the burnt building.

== Impact on local area ==
The Keltic Resort is a source of employment for Ingonish, and draws tourists to the area. From May to October about one hundred people – many from the local community – are employed at the lodge. Cape Breton University students are also recruited for summer jobs.
