= USS Celtic (AF-2) =

Cargo ship of the United States Navy

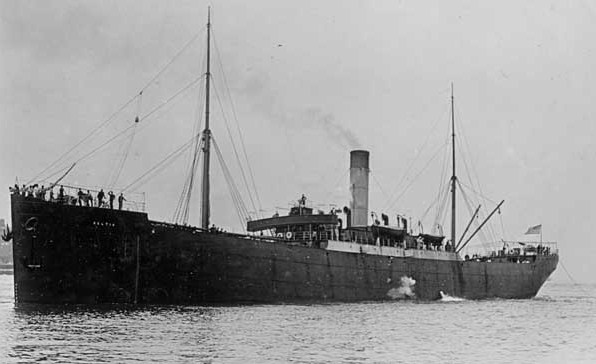
- USS Celtic (1898–1923, later AF-2) Photographed circa May 1898

History

United States
- Name: USS Celtic
- Laid down: 1891 as SS Celtic Cloud
- Launched: 1891
- Acquired: 14 May 1898
- Commissioned: USS Celtic, 27 May 1898
- Decommissioned: 18 September 1903
- In service: 23 October 1908
- Out of service: 17 May 1922
- Stricken: date unknown
- Fate: Sold 23 January 1923

General characteristics
- Displacement: 6,750 t.
- Length: 383 ft 1 in (116.76 m)
- Beam: 44 ft 7 in (13.59 m)
- Draught: 21 ft (6.4 m)
- Propulsion: type unknown
- Speed: 10 kts
- Complement: 182
- Armament: unknown

USS Celtic (AF-2) was a Celtic-class stores ship acquired by the U.S. Navy for use in the Spanish–American War. She served again during World War I in the dangerous North Atlantic Ocean, delivering general goods and ammunition to American Expeditionary Force troops in Europe.

== Acquisition for Spanish–American War service ==
Celtic (AF-2) was built in 1891 by Workman, Clark and Co., Ltd., Belfast, Northern Ireland, as SS Celtic King; purchased by the Navy 14 May 1898; fitted out at New York Navy Yard; and commissioned 27 May 1898.

== Spanish–American War operations ==
From 11 June to 25 September 1898, Celtic supplied fleet units in Cuban and Florida waters with medical supplies, fresh provisions, and ice. On 12 October, she cleared New York to round Cape Horn on the long route to the Asiatic Station, arriving at Cavite, Philippine Islands, 30 March, for service as storeship. Supporting the quelling of the Philippine–American War, Celtic carried stores and passengers between the Philippines and Australian ports until 16 July 1903, when she weighed anchor for Puget Sound Navy Yard. Here she was out of commission between 18 September 1903 and 19 October 1905.

== Relief and local operations ==
Returning to New York City 24 January 1906, Celtic began supply operations with the Atlantic fleet until 23 February 1907, when she again went out of commission. She was recommissioned at Boston Navy Yard 23 October 1908. At the suggestion of her commander, President Roosevelt ordered the Celtic to earthquake-damaged Sicily because she was already full of Christmas provisions, where she set up a tent city at Messina. She returned to her U.S. East Coast and Caribbean operations 15 April 1909. Key supply ship for the Veracruz operation, Celtic lay anchored off the Mexican city from 16 June 1914 to 24 July 1915, except for occasional voyages to Key West, Florida, and Cape Haitien, Haiti, for replenishment.

== World War I operations ==
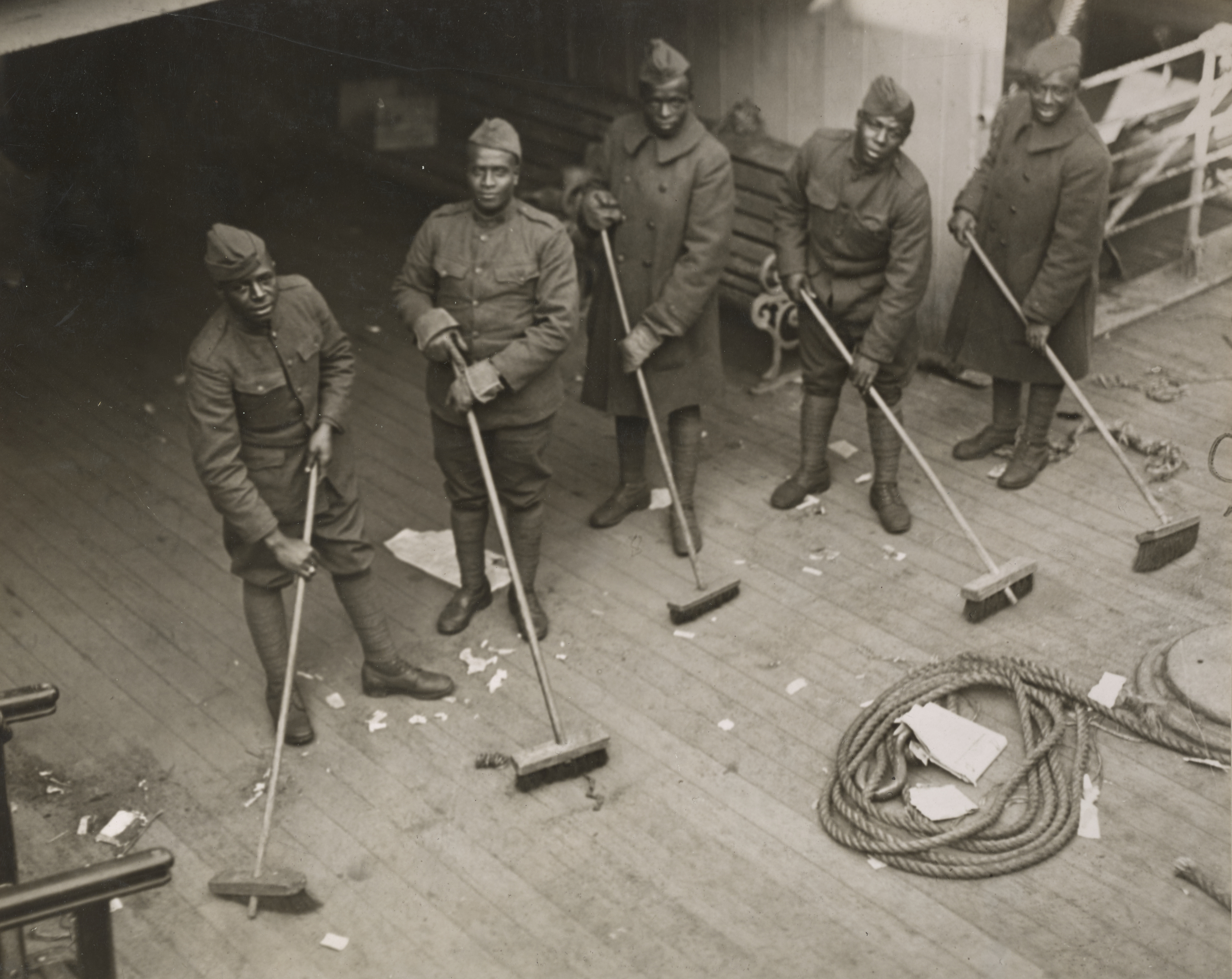
USS Celtic (AF-2) stores ship built in 1891 carrying African-American soldiers

Her voyages carrying stores from New York to Caribbean forces ended 2 July 1917, when Celtic cleared New York to carry cargo to American bases at Queenstown, Ireland, and Brest, France. She returned to New York 27 August, carried parts of the 168th regiment to Belfast, Ireland in November, 1917 and then resumed her Caribbean runs until 1 July 1918. Transferred then to the Naval Overseas Transportation Service, she crossed the Atlantic twice to English ports and once to the Adriatic with ammunition and stores.

== Pacific Ocean operations ==
Reassigned to the U.S. Pacific Fleet on 30 June 1919, Celtic cleared New York 31 August, arriving at San Pedro, Los Angeles, 22 September. She cruised the west coast carrying and issuing stores to the Fleet until 22 March 1921, when she was assigned to duty as cold storage station ship at Apra, Guam. Celtic sailed from Guam on her last naval passage 17 May 1922, arriving at Cavite 26 May.

== Post-war decommissioning ==
There she was decommissioned 23 June 1922, and sold 23 January 1923.
