= Guadalcanal naval order of battle =

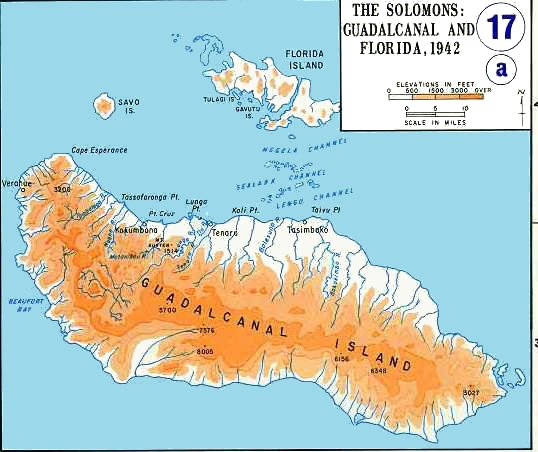
Guadalcanal and neighboring islands

On 7 August 1942, US and Australian naval forces undertook the invasion of the Japanese-held islands of Guadalcanal and Tulagi in the lower Solomon Islands chain, the first Allied offensive in the Pacific Theatre. The landing of the US 1st Marine Division on the beaches of Savo Sound began the unexpectedly long and extremely arduous Guadalcanal Campaign, lasting officially until 9 February 1943.

The naval forces dedicated to Operation Watchtower were minuscule compared to those deployed for later Allied offensives such as the invasion of the Gilberts and the capture of Okinawa. This is owing to the commitment the United States had made to Great Britain to undertake the invasion of North Africa in the fall of 1942, a commitment which essentially left the Guadalcanal operation with the naval leftovers. For this reason, American sailors and Marines referred to the invasion as "Operation Shoestring".

US Navy combat ships:
3 fleet carriers, 1 fast battleship, 9 heavy cruisers, 2 anti-aircraft light cruisers, 31 destroyers

Amphibious assault vessels:
13 transports, 6 attack cargo ships, 4 destroyer transports

Auxiliaries:
5 fast minesweepers, 5 oilers

Australian Navy combat ships:
2 heavy cruisers, 1 light cruiser

== Command structure ==
Theatre commanders for Operation Watchtower

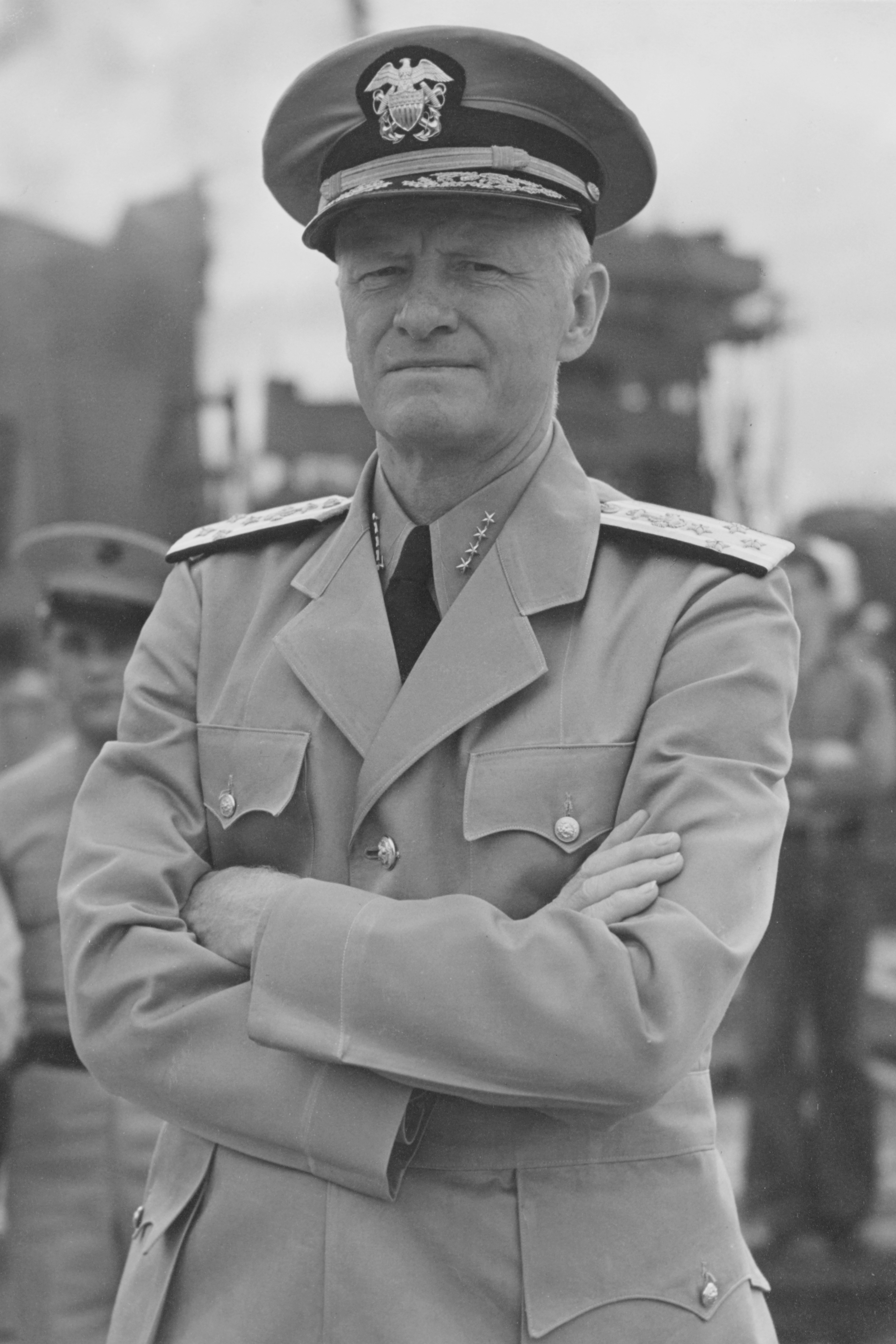
Adm. Chester W. Nimitz

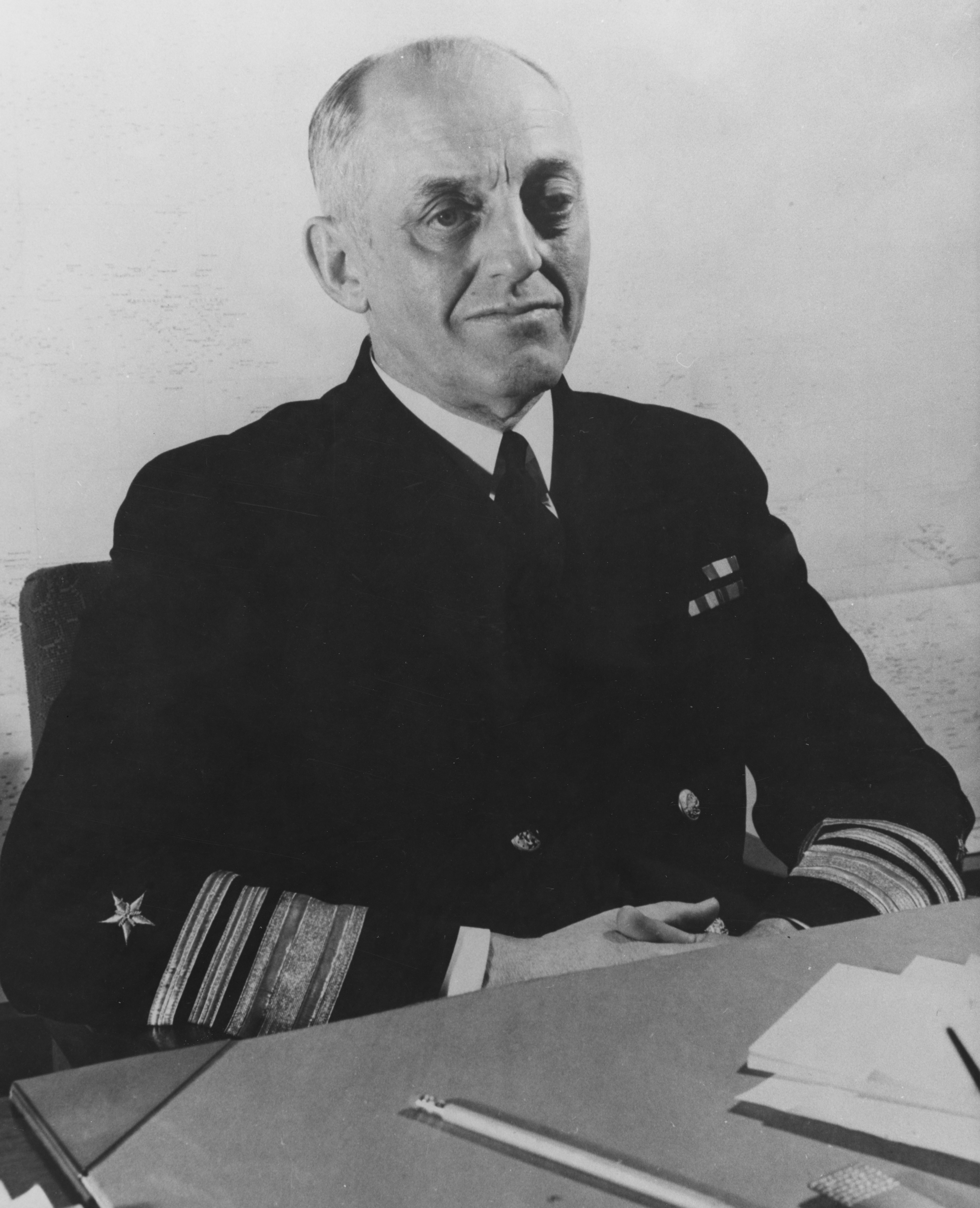
Vice Adm. Robert L. Ghormley (through 18 Oct)

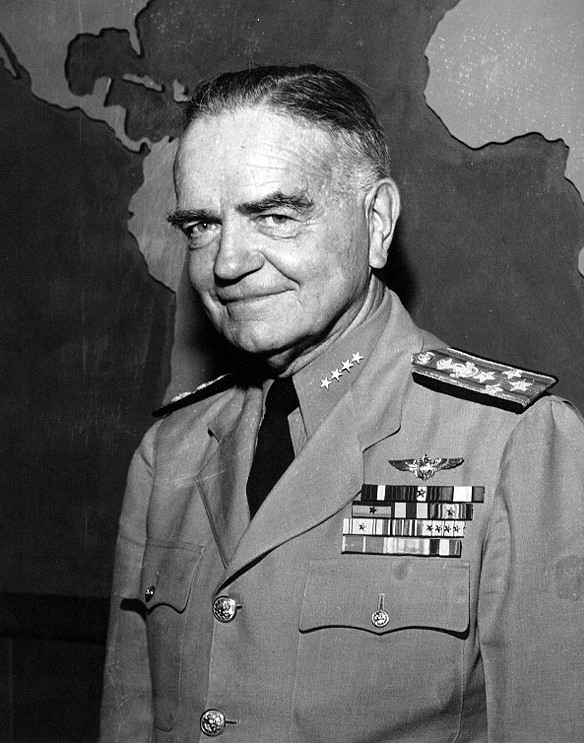
Vice Adm. William F. Halsey (after 18 Oct)

Operational commanders

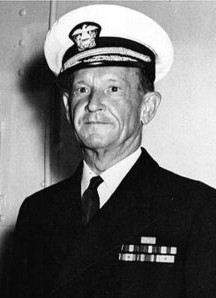
Vice Adm. Frank Jack Fletcher

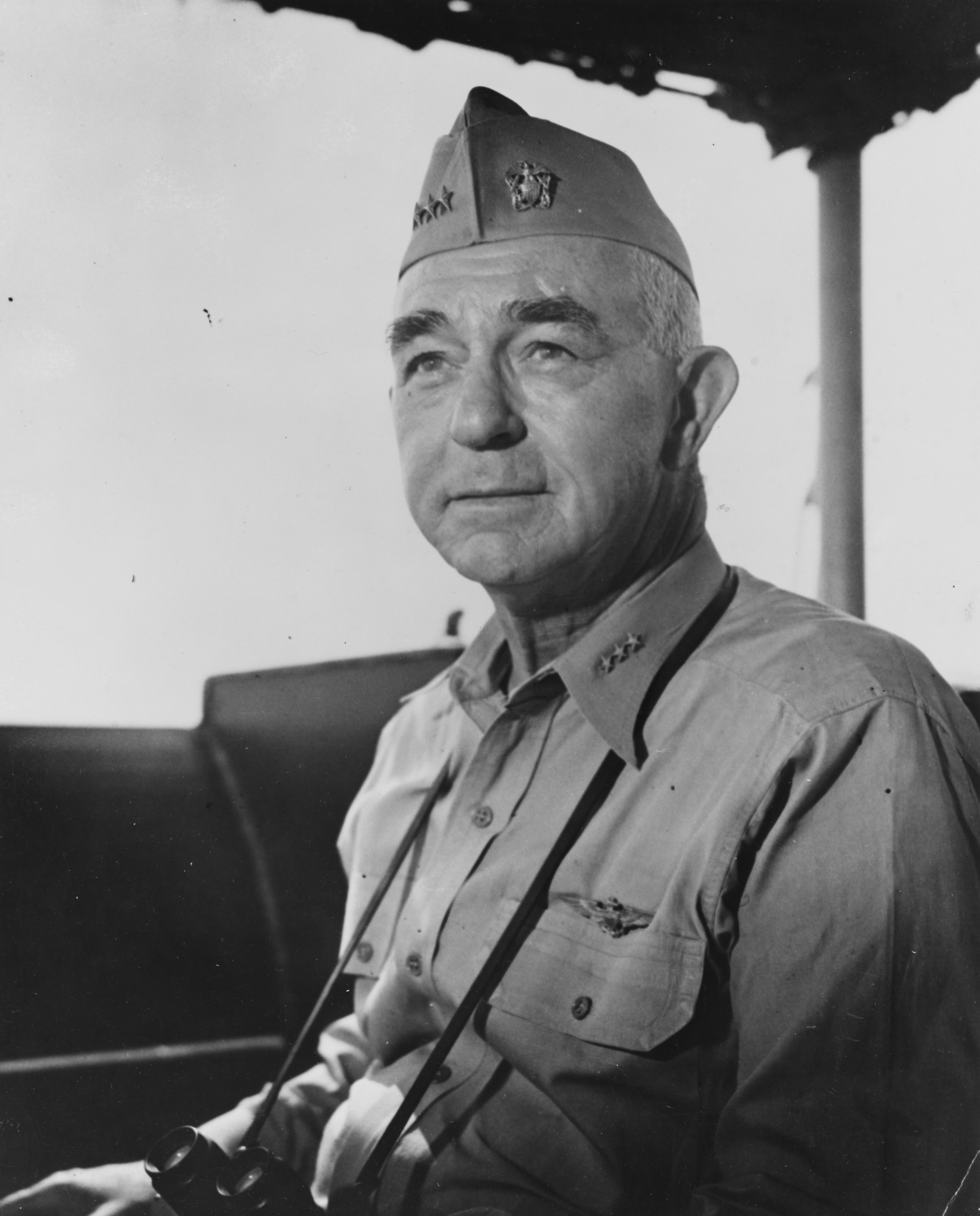
Rear Adm. Richmond Kelly Turner

=== Theater command ===
The roles of Commander in Chief, Pacific Ocean Areas (CINCPOA) and Commander in Chief, U.S. Pacific Fleet (CINCPAC), were both exercised by Admiral Chester W. Nimitz from his headquarters at Pearl Harbor, Hawaii.

Since the Solomons lie in the Southern Pacific, the landings of 7 August 1942 on Guadalcanal were the responsibility of the South Pacific Fleet, led by Vice Admiral Robert L. Ghormley from his headquarters at Noumea, New Caledonia. Adm. Ghormley's pessimism, inadequate staff work and unwillingness to visit the front led Adm. Nimitz to replace him with the much more aggressive and hands-on Vice Admiral William F. Halsey on 18 October 1942.

=== Operational command ===
Operational command of the invasion was assigned to Vice Admiral Frank Jack Fletcher, who also had direct command of the covering force, designated Task Force 61, where he flew his flag aboard fleet carrier Saratoga. This embodiment of two levels of command in a single officer enabled a decision-making process that left the Marine forces on Guadalcanal essentially stranded and short-supplied. The amphibious forces, Task Force 62, were led by Rear Admiral Richmond Kelly Turner aboard transport McCawley.

Bitter disputes between the two men arose during both the planning and execution of the invasion over how long Fletcher's aircraft carriers would stay in the vicinity of Guadalcanal to provide air cover for the Marines ashore. Fletcher decided the matter after multiple assaults on the Allied amphibious task force by bombers from the Japanese base at Rabaul on D-Day and D+1. These attacks convinced Fletcher that his crucial aircraft carriers could not be risked in the waters of the Solomons any longer and he ordered his carriers along with Turner's still-half-full cargo ships out of the area on the night of 8 August. This decision resulted in much hard feeling among the Marines ashore, who felt that the Navy had abandoned them.

== Forces afloat ==
=== Expeditionary Force (Task Force 61) ===
Vice Admiral Frank Jack Fletcher

Air Support Force (Task Group 61.1)

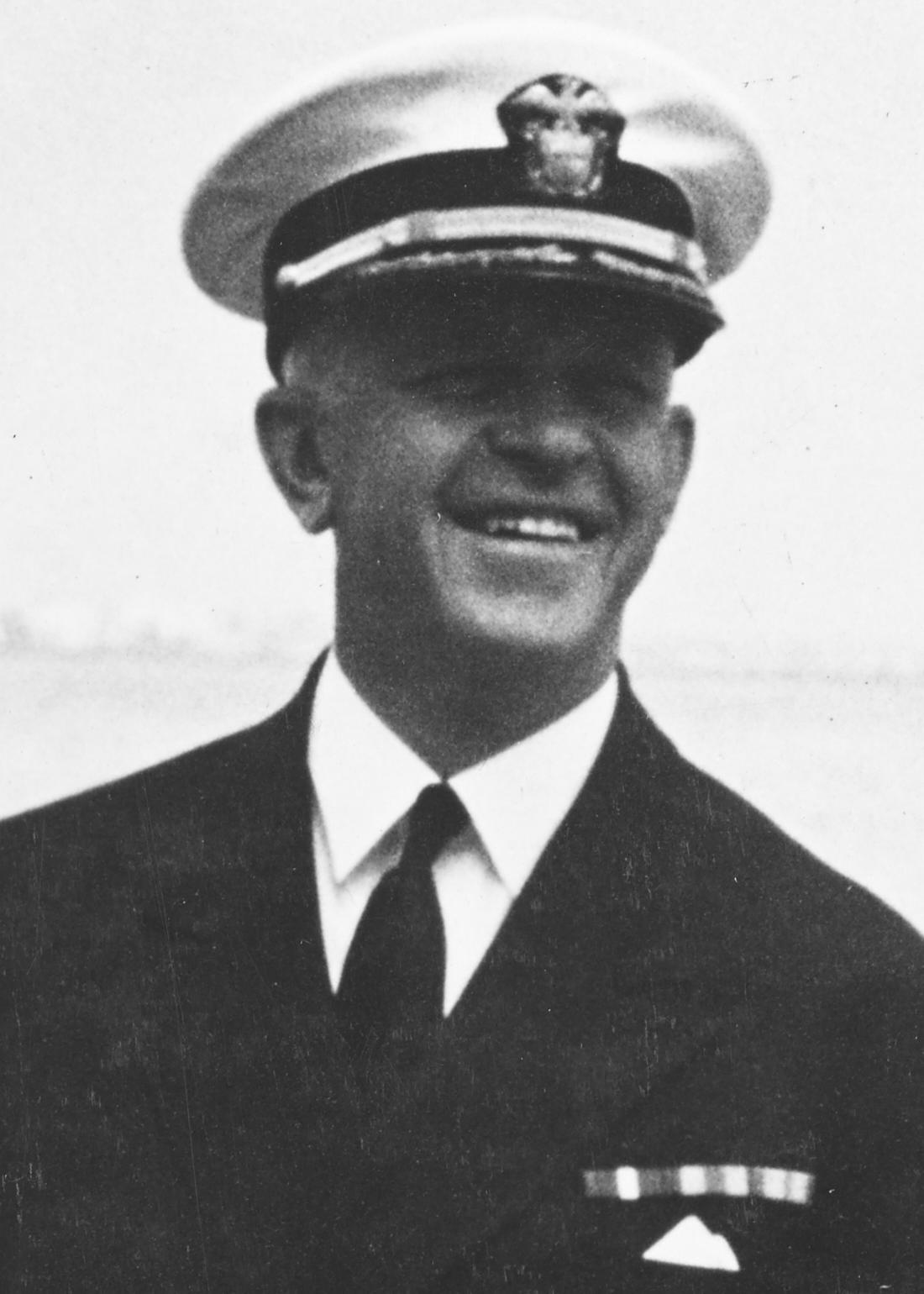
Leigh Noyes as a captain

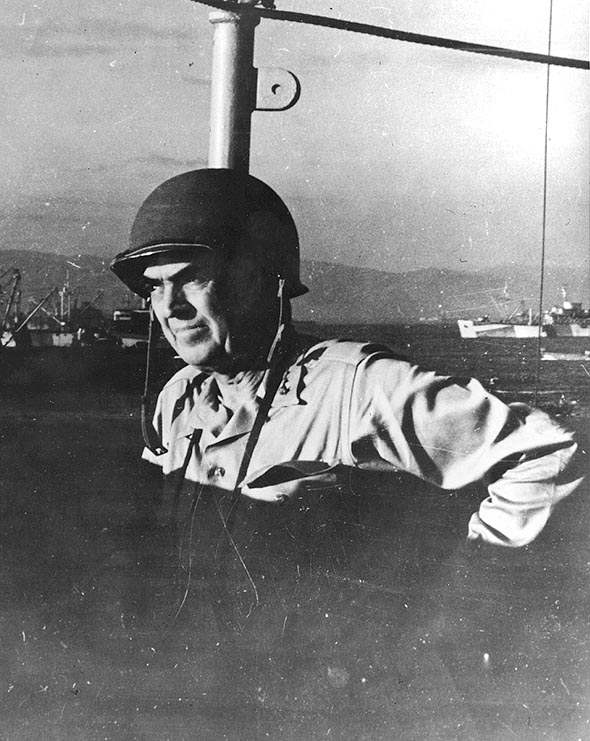
Thomas C. Kinkaid as a vice admiral

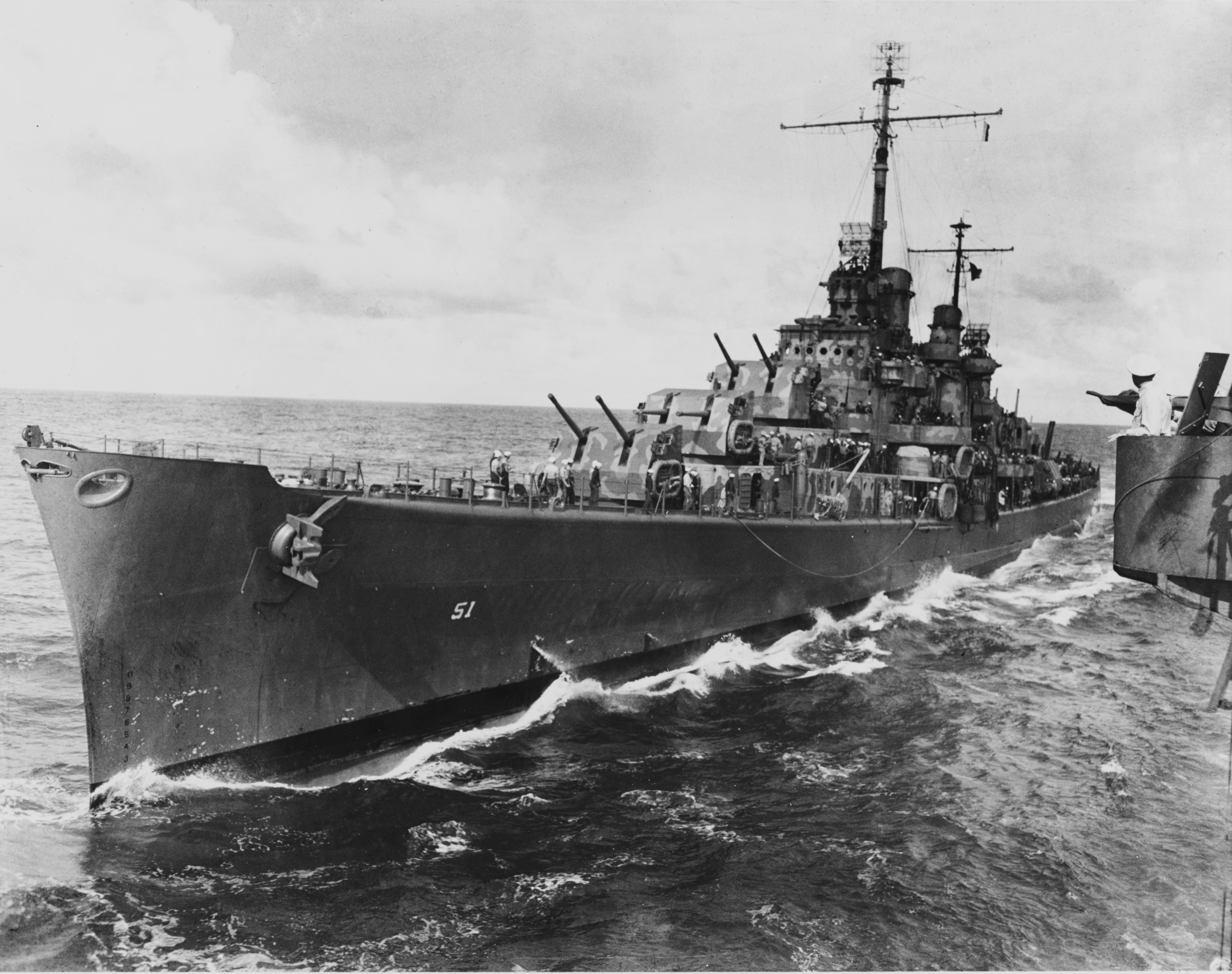
Anti-aircraft light cruiser Atlanta underway

Rear Admiral Leigh Noyes

Task Unit under Vice Admiral Fletcher
Vice Admiral Fletcher

1 fleet carrier

Saratoga (Capt. DeWitt C. Ramsey)

Air Group (Cmdr. Harry D. Felt)

VF-5: 34 F4F Wildcat fighters (Lt. Cmdr. Leroy C. Sampler)
VB-3: 18 SBD Dauntless dive bombers (Lt. Cmdr. Dewitt W. Shumway)
VS-3: 18 SBD Dauntless scout bombers (Lt. Cmdr. Louis J. Kirn)
VT-8: 16 TBF Avenger torpedo bombers (Lt. Harold H. Larsen)

2 New Orleans-class heavy cruisers

Minneapolis (Capt. Frank J. Lowry)
New Orleans (Capt. Walter S. DeLany)

Screen (Capt. Samuel B. Brewer)

1 Porter-class destroyer (8 × 5-in. main battery): Phelps
4 Farragut-class destroyers (5 × 5-in. main battery): Farragut, Macdonough, Dale, Worden

Task Unit from old Task Force 16
Rear Admiral Thomas C. Kinkaid

1 fleet carrier

Enterprise (Capt. Arthur C. Davis)

Air Group (Lt. Cmdr. Maxwell F. Leslie)

VF-6: 36 F4F Wildcat fighters (Lt. Louis H. Bauer)
VB-6: 18 SBD Dauntless dive bombers (Lt. Ray Davis)
VS-5: 18 SBD Dauntless scout bombers (Lt. Turner F. Caldwell, Jr.)
VT-3: 14 TBF Avenger torpedo bombers (Lt. Cmdr. Charles M. Jett)

1 North Carolina-class fast battleship

North Carolina (Capt. George H. Fort)

1 Portland-class heavy cruiser

Portland (Capt. Laurance T. DuBose)

1 Atlanta-class anti-aircraft light cruiser (Note: These cruisers were intended as destroyer leaders when designed. After the first two to be used in this role, Atlanta and Juneau, were lost at the Naval Battle of Guadalcanal, this mission was rejected and the anti-aircraft mission adopted.)

Atlanta (scuttled after heavy damage, 13 Nov 1942) (Capt. Samuel P. Jenkins)

Screen (Capt. Edward P. Sauer)

2 Gleaves-class destroyers (5 × 5-in. main battery): Gwin (sunk 13 July 1943), Grayson
1 Gridley-class destroyer (4 × 5-in. main battery): Maury
1 Benham-class destroyer (4 × 5-in. main battery): Benham (sunk 15 Nov 1942)
1 Porter-class destroyer (8 × 5-in. main battery): Balch

Task Unit under Rear Admiral Noyes

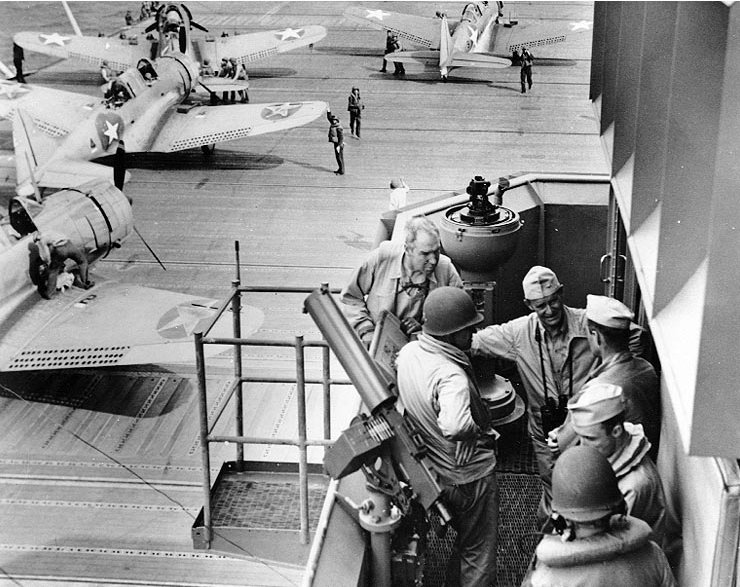
Bridge of Wasp, 7 August 1942; Capt. Sherman at left wearing helmet, Rear Adm. Noyes facing camera

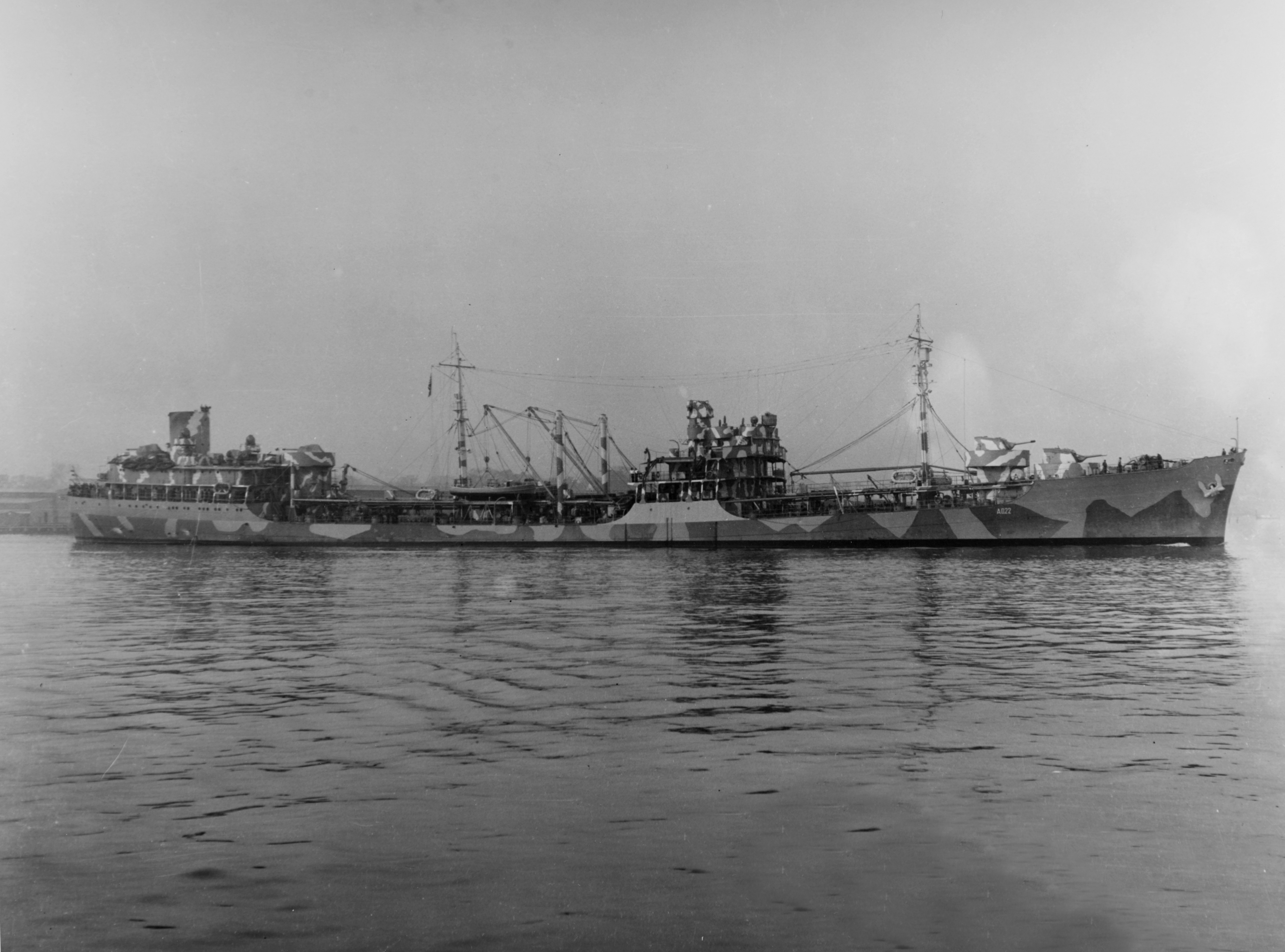
Oiler Cimarron

Rear Admiral Noyes

1 fleet carrier

Wasp (scuttled after being torpedoed, 15 Sep 1942) (Capt. Forrest P. Sherman)

Air Group (Lt. Cmdr. Wallace M. Beakley)

VF-71: 29 F4F Wildcat fighters (Lt. Cmdr. Courtney Shands)
VS-71: 15 SBD Dauntless scout bombers (Lt. Cmdr. John Eldridge, Jr. (Note: Killed during campaign))
VS-72: 15 SBD Dauntless scout bombers (Lt. Cmdr. Ernest M. Snowden)
VT-7: 9 TBF Avenger torpedo bombers (Lt. Henry A. Romberg)

1 New Orleans-class heavy cruiser

San Francisco (Capt. Charles H. McMorris)

1 Pensacola-class heavy cruiser

Salt Lake City (Capt. Ernest G. Small)

Screen (Capt. Robert G. Tobin)

2 Benson-class destroyers (4 × 5-in. main battery): Laffey (sunk 13 Nov 1942), Farenholt
1 Gleaves-class destroyer (4 × 5-in. main battery): Aaron Ward (sunk 7 Apr 1943)
3 Benham-class destroyers (4 × 5-in. main battery): Lang, Sterett, Stack

Fueling group

5 oilers

Cimarron, Platte, Sabine, Kaskaskia, Kanawha (sunk 8 Apr 1943)

=== South Pacific Amphibious Force (Task Force 62) ===
Rear Admiral Richmond Kelly Turner in transport McCawley

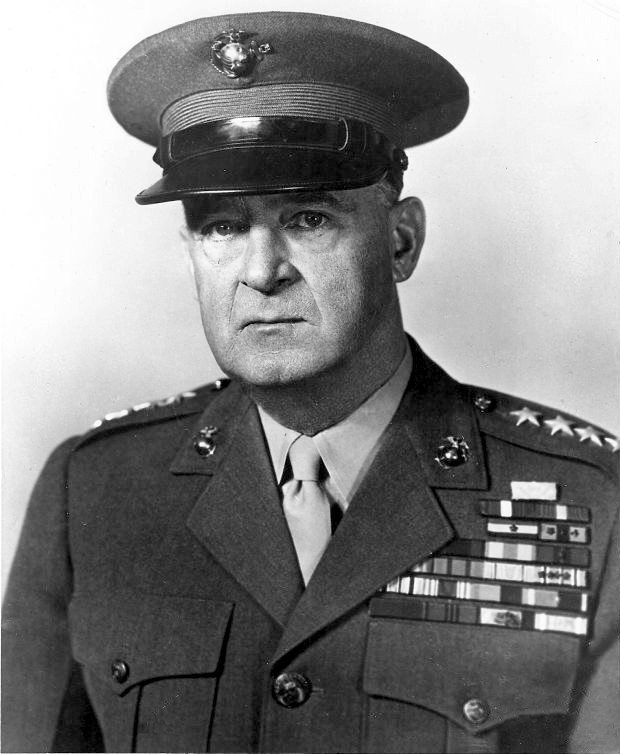
Maj. Gen. Alexander A. Vandegrift, USMC

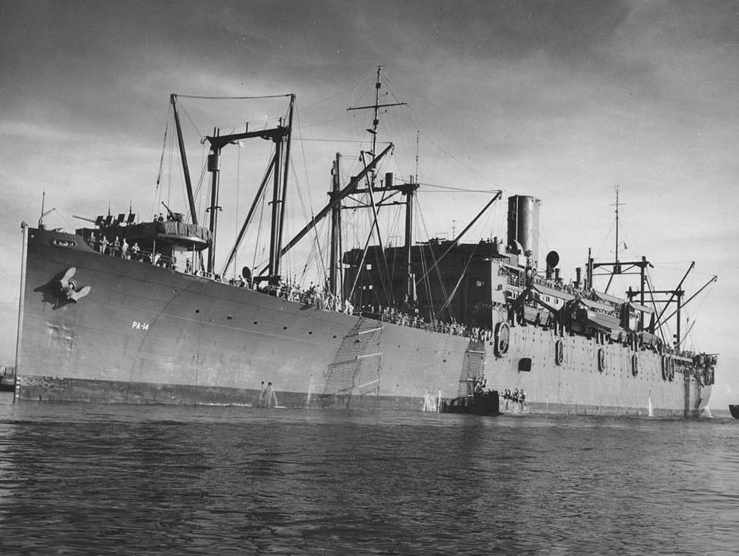
Rear Adm. Turner's flagship, transport Hunter Liggett

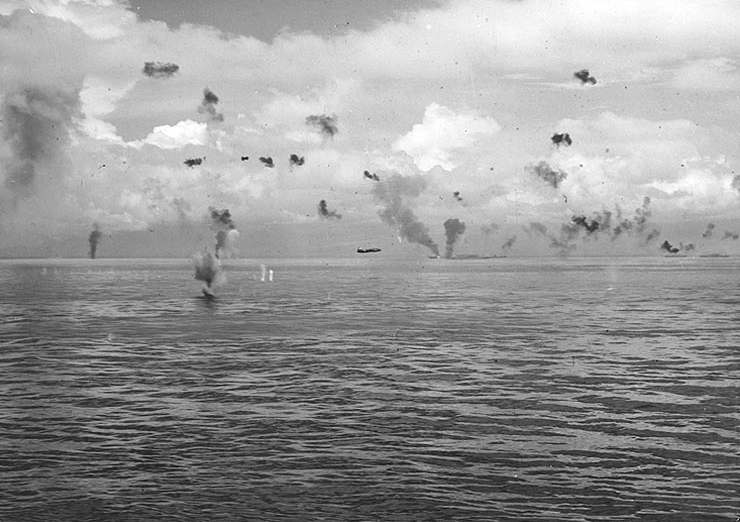
Mitsubishi G4M "Betty" land-based bomber carrying out torpedo attack in Savo Sound, 8 August 1942

Convoy (Task Group 62.1)
Captain Lawrence F. Reifsnider in transport Hunter Liggett
Embarking 1st Marine Division (Maj. Gen. Alexander A. Vandegrift, USMC, Commander ground forces)

Transport Group "X-Ray" – Guadalcanal Landings
Captain Reifsnider

Transport Division A (Capt. Paul S. Theiss)
Embarking 5th Marines less 2nd Battalion (Col. LeRoy P. Hunt, USMC)

2 transports: Fuller, American Legion
1 attack cargo ship: Bellatrix

Transport Division B (Capt. Charlie P. McFeaters)
Embarking Division HQ and 1st Marines (Col. Clifton B. Cates, USMC)

3 transports: McCawley (sunk 30 Jun 1943), Barnett, George F. Elliott (sunk 8 Aug 1942)
1 attack cargo ship: Libra

Transport Division C (Capt. Reifsnider)
Embarking part of Support Group, Special Weapons Battalion, 5th Battalion / 11th Marines, part of 3rd Defense Battalion

1 transport: Hunter Liggett
3 attack cargo ships: Alchiba, Fomalhaut, Betelgeuse

Transport Division D (Capt. Ingolf N. Kiland)
Embarking 2nd Marines less 1st Battalion (Col. John M. Arthur, USMC)

3 transports: Crescent City, President Adams, President Hayes
1 attack cargo ship: Alhena

Transport Group "Yoke" – Tulagi Landings
Captain George B. Ashe

Transport Division E (Capt. Ashe)
Embarking 2nd Battalion / 5th Marines, 1st Battalion / 2nd Marines, 1st Parachute Battalion, Co. E / 1st Raider Battalion (Brig. Gen. William H. Rupertus, USMC)

4 transports: Neville, Zeilin, Heywood, President Jackson

Transport Division 12 (Capt. Hugh W. Hadley) (Note: Killed in action when Little was sunk by Japanese destroyers on 5 September)
Embarking 1st Raider Battalion less Co. E (Lt. Col. Merritt A. Edson, USMC)

4 destroyer transports: Colhoun (sunk 30 Aug 1942), Little (sunk 5 Sep 1942), McKean, Gregory (sunk 5 Sep 1942)

Escort (Task Group 62.2)

Combat ship commanders

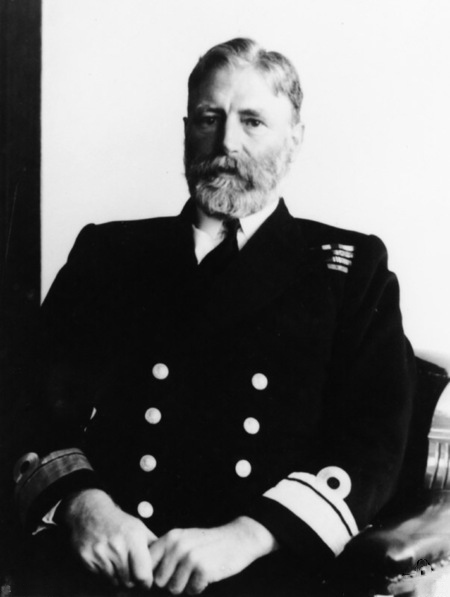
Rear Adm. V.A.C. Crutchley, RN, VC

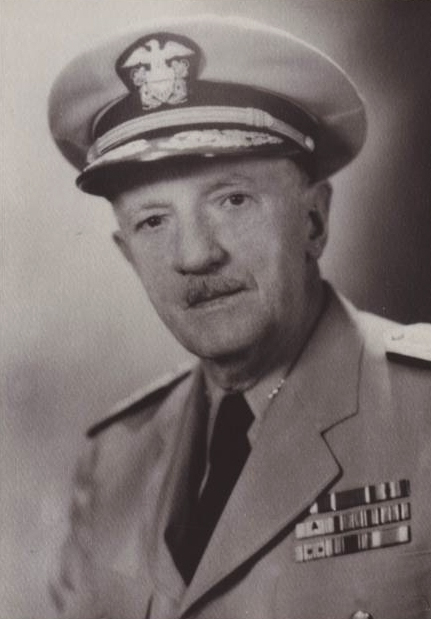
Capt. Frederick L. Riefkohl, USN

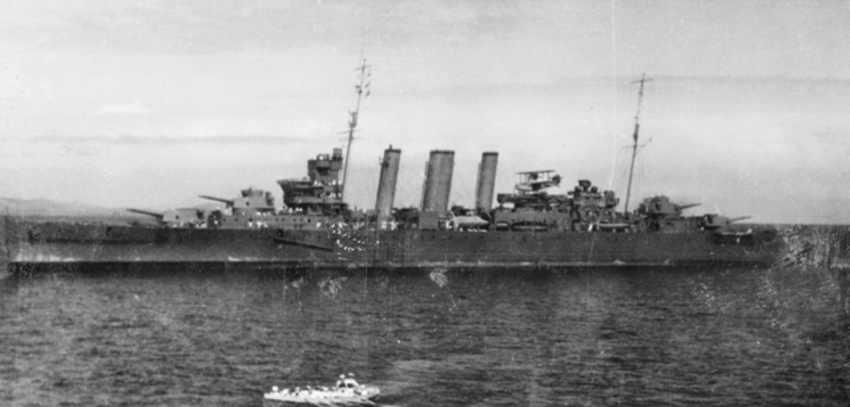
HMAS Canberra off Tulagi the day before her sinking at the Battle of Savo Island

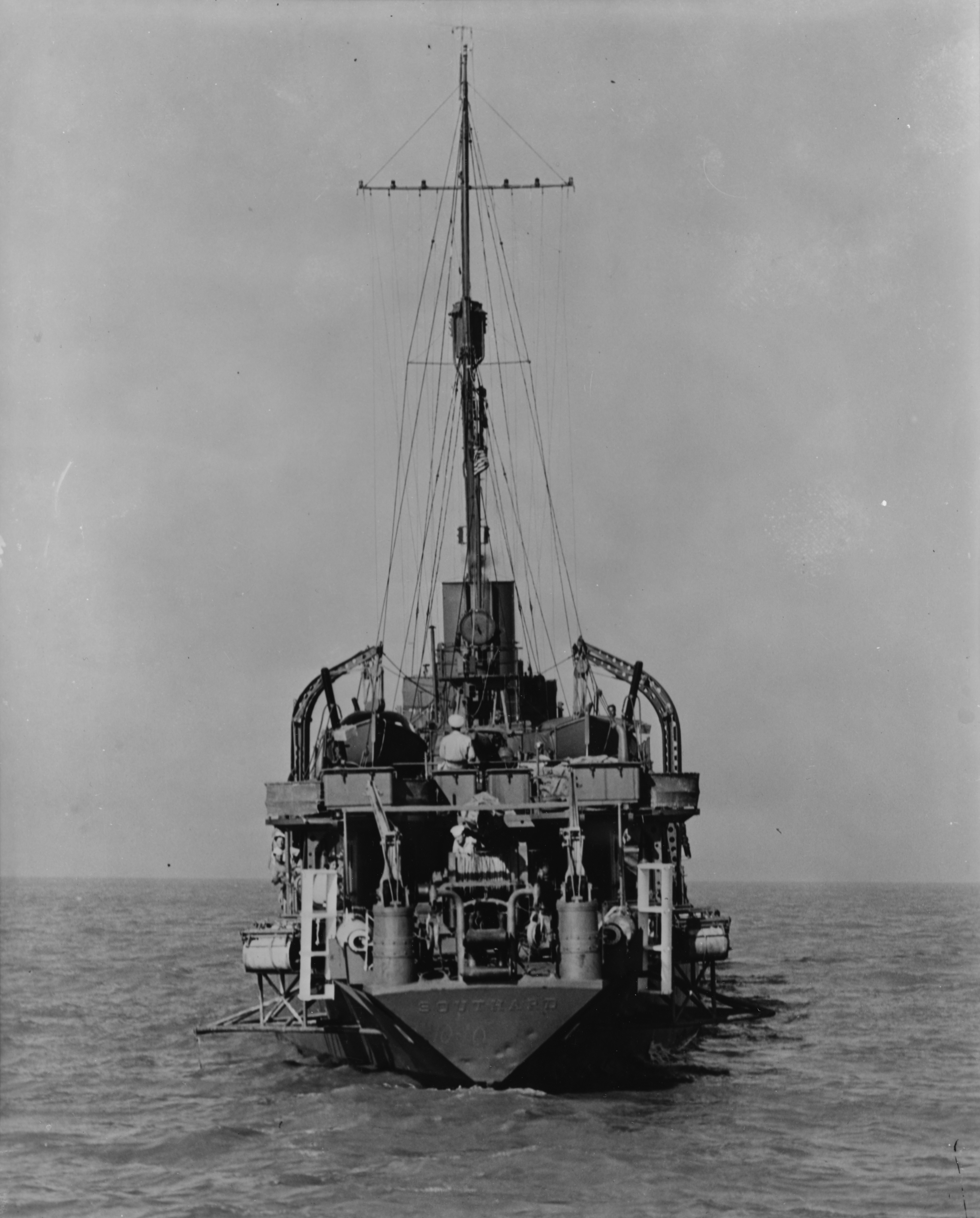
Stern view of Southard after her conversion to a fast minesweeper

Rear Admiral Victor A.C. Crutchley, RN

3 heavy cruisers

Australia (Capt. H.B. Farncomb, RAN)
Canberra (sunk night of 8-9 Aug) (Capt. F.E. Getting, RAN) (Note: Killed at Battle of Savo Island, 9 August 1942)
Chicago (sunk 30 Jan 1943) (Capt. Howard D. Bode) (Note: Committed suicide upon learning he would be held partially responsible for the disaster at the Battle of Savo Island.)

1 light cruiser

Hobart (Capt. H.A. Showers, RAN)

Screen (Capt. Cornelius W. Flynn)

1 Porter-class (8 × 5-in. main battery): Selfridge
8 Bagley-class (4 × 5-in. main battery): Bagley, Blue (sunk 22 August 1942), Helm, Mugford, Ralph Talbot, Henley (sunk 3 Oct 1943), Patterson, Jarvis (sunk 9 August 1942) (Note: Sunk by air attack following Battle of Savo Island, Lt. Cmdr. Graham had had all lifeboats and rafts removed to save weight, so there were no survivors; the Jarvis was one of only two US vessels lost with all hands during the war.)

Fire Support Group L (Task Group 62.3)
Captain Frederick L. Riefkohl (Note: First Puerto Rican to graduate from US Naval Academy; relieved following disastrous Battle of Savo Island and never held another sea command)

3 heavy cruisers

2 New Orleans-class: Vincennes (sunk night of 8-9 Aug 1942) (Capt. Riefkohl), Quincy (sunk night of 8-9 Aug 1942) (Capt. Samuel N. Moore) (Note: Killed at Battle of Savo Island, 9 August 1942)
1 Astoria-class: Astoria (sunk night of 8-9 Aug 1942) (Capt. William G. Greenman)

4 destroyers

2 Benham-class (4 × 5 in. main battery): Ellet, Wilson
2 Farragut-class (4 × 5 in. main battery): Hull, Dewey (Lt. Cmdr. Charles F. Chillingworth, Jr.)

Fire Support Group M (Task Group 62.4)
Rear Admiral Norman Scott (Note: Killed at Naval Battle of Guadalcanal, 13 November 1942)

1 anti-aircraft light cruiser (Atlanta class) (Note: These cruisers were intended as destroyer leaders when designed. After the first two to be used in this role, Atlanta and Juneau, were lost at the Naval Battle of Guadalcanal, this mission was rejected and the anti-aircraft mission adopted.)

San Juan (Capt. James E. Maher)

2 destroyers (both Gleaves-class (5 × 5-in. main battery, then 4 × 5-in.)

Monssen (sunk 13 Nov 1942), Buchanan

Minesweeper Group (Task Group 62.5)

5 fast minesweepers (ex-Clemson-class destroyers)

Hopkins, Trever, Zane, Southard (Note: Lt. Herman Wouk, USN, based his 1951 novel The Caine Mutiny on his experience as executive officer of this ship and earlier service aboard minesweeper Zane.), Hovey

== Bibliography ==
- Morison, Samuel Eliot (1949). Coral Sea, Midway and Submarine Actions, May 1942 – August 1942. History of United States Naval Operations in World War II. Vol. IV. Boston: Little, Brown and Co. ISBN 0-3165-8304-9.
- Morison, Samuel Eliot (1948). The Struggle for Guadalcanal, August 1942 – February 1943. History of United States Naval Operations in World War II. Vol. V. Boston: Little, Brown and Co. ISBN 0-7858-1306-3.
- Silverstone, Paul H. (1970). U.S. Warships of World War II. Garden City, NY: Doubleday and Co. ISBN 0-8702-1773-9.
- Stille, Mark (2016). US Navy Light Cruisers, 1941-45. Oxford: Osprey Publishing, Ltd. ISBN 978-1-4728-1140-0.
