= USS Aylwin (DD-355) =

Farragut-class destroyer

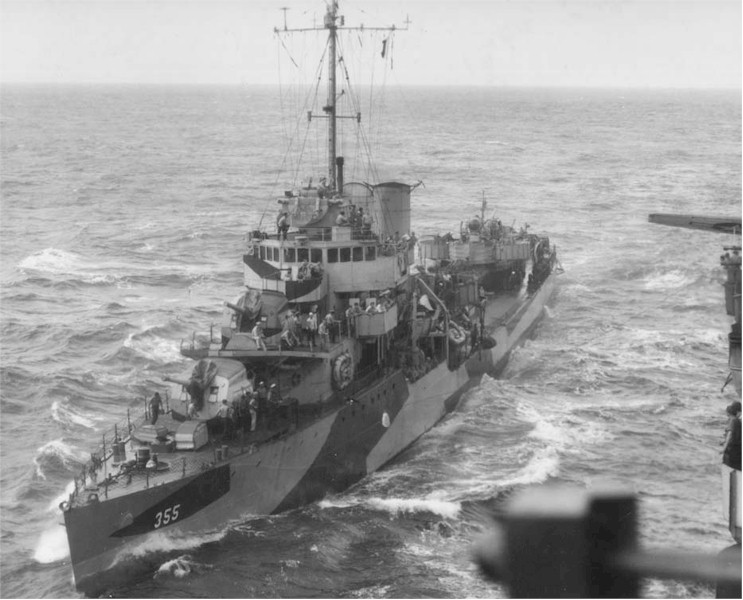
- USS Aylwin (DD-355)

History

United States
- Name: Aylwin (DD-355)
- Namesake: John Cushing Aylwin (1778–1812)
- Builder: Philadelphia Naval Shipyard
- Laid down: 23 September 1933
- Launched: 10 July 1934
- Commissioned: 1 March 1935
- Decommissioned: 16 October 1945
- Stricken: 1 November 1945
- Honors and awards: 13 × battle stars
- Fate: Sold for scrap, 20 December 1946

General characteristics
- Class & type: Farragut-class destroyer
- Displacement: 1,375 tons
- Length: 341 ft 3 in (104.01 m)
- Beam: 34 ft 3 in (10.44 m)
- Draft: 16 ft 4 in (4.98 m)
- Speed: 37 kn (69 km/h)
- Range: 6500 nmi at 12 knots; (12,000 km at 22 km/h)
- Complement: 251 officers and enlisted
- Armament: As Built: 5 × 5"(127mm)/38cal DP (5x1), 8 × 21 inch (533 mm) T Tubes (2x4), 4 × .50cal (12.7mm) MG AA (4x1); c1943: 1 × Mk 33 Gun Fire Control System; 4 × 5" (127mm)/38cal DP (4x1), 8 × 21" (533 mm) T Tubes (2x4), 5 × Oerlikon 20 mm AA (5x1), 2 × Mk 51 Gun Directors; 4 × Bofors 40 mm AA (2x2), 2 × Depth Charge stern racks

USS Aylwin (DD-355) was a Farragut-class destroyer, and the third ship of the United States Navy to be named for Lieutenant John Cushing Aylwin (1778–1812).

== Construction and commissioning ==
Aylwin was laid down on 23 September 1933 by the Philadelphia Navy Yard, launched on 10 July 1934, sponsored by Miss Elizabeth M. Farley, the 11-year-old daughter of Postmaster General James Farley, and commissioned on 1 March 1935.

== 1935–1941 ==
=== 1935 ===
Following builders' trials late in March, and fitting out, the destroyer shifted to the Naval Torpedo Station, Newport, Rhode Island, to load eight torpedo warheads. At the end of further trials, she returned to Philadelphia on 8 May to prepare for shakedown.

On 22 May, Aylwin sailed for a cruise that took her to European countries. She stopped at Port Leixões (Porto), Portugal, on 1 June and at Santander, Spain, on the 5th, before shifting to Cherbourg, France, on the 10th. Five days later, the Honorable Jesse I. Straus, the United States Ambassador to France, inspected the new destroyer.

The warship next visited Bremen, Germany from 19 to 24 June, before sailing for Gothenburg, Sweden, and a five-day visit. Then, after getting underway for Belgium on the 29th, she reached Brussels late on 2 July and there received her only royal visit when, on the morning of the 8th, King Leopold III and Queen Astrid came on board for an hour's inspection.

The ship visited Dover, England, before heading homeward on 15 July. She reached Philadelphia, Pennsylvania on the 22nd, received post-shakedown repairs, and conducted further trials that lasted until 1 October, when she put to sea to join the Fleet. She fell in with her sister ship USS Hull the next day, and the two ships reached Guantánamo Bay, Cuba, on the 5th, where Aylwin unloaded a cargo of light freight. After transiting the Panama Canal on 7 October, she paused briefly at Balboa, Panama Canal Zone, before sailing on the 10th for a plane-guard station off Champerico, Guatemala, to provide a directional bearing along the projected track of the experimental flying boat XP3Y-1, the prototype of the PBY Catalina.

Aylwin reached her assigned position on 13 October and, the next morning, began laying smoke to serve as marker for the plane. The destroyer's lookouts sighted the plane at 12:38, and it passed directly overhead seven minutes later. Ultimately, the XP3Y-1 reached San Francisco Bay on 15 October, having set a new international distance record for seaplane flights—3,281.402 statute miles (5,280.905 km).

The destroyer rejoined Hull the next day; and the two ships steamed into San Diego, California harbor on the 19th. After a visit to Stockton, California, from 26 to 29 October, Aylwin began her peacetime duty with the Fleet, operating off the coast of southern California in flotilla tactics, torpedo attacks, short range battle practices, and sound training runs with the submarines USS Nautilus and USS Cuttlefish.

=== 1936 ===
On 10 February 1936, Aylwin departed San Diego and entered the Mare Island Navy Yard on the following day for repairs and alterations. She ran her post-repair trials on 3 April.

Following brief operations off Pyramid Cove, San Clemente Island, Aylwin sailed for the Canal Zone on 27 April to participate in Fleet Problem XVII, a five-phased evolution. The problem pitted the Battle Force against a submarine-augmented Scouting Force.

As the opposing forces engaged off the west coast of Central America near the Panama Canal, Aylwin conducted simulated gun attacks on "enemy" destroyers and torpedo attacks on the "enemy" battle line. She anchored off Balboa on 9 May, refueled the following day, and resumed her participation in the fleet problem on the 16th as part of the "Green" fleet.

After the exercises, Aylwin sailed to Peru and arrived at Callao on the morning of 28 May. That day, Rear Admiral Sinclair Gannon, Commander, Destroyers, Scouting Force, broke his flag in Aylwin. Winding up her Peruvian visit on 2 June, she got underway for California, but paused in Panama Bay from 6 to 8 June before continuing on to San Diego. Aylwin reached her home port on the morning of 16 June and moored alongside USS Dobbin. That afternoon, Rear Admiral Gannon transferred his flag to the destroyer tender.

On 6 July, Aylwin got underway for the Pacific Northwest and reached Port Angeles, Washington, on the 9th. She sailed thence via the inland passage to Alaska and arrived at Cordova on the 13th. Following a subsequent visit to Kodiak, a return call at Port Angeles, and tender upkeep there alongside Dobbin, the destroyer conducted sound tracking exercises at Admiralty Bay, Port Townsend, Washington. She visited Portland, Oregon, from 5 to 10 August before heading home where she arrived on the 13th.

A week later, she got underway for tactical exercises in company with USS Worden and USS Monaghan; but they soon commenced looking for the overdue San Diego–based tuna boat SS San Juaquin, last reported in their vicinity. The Coast Guard cutter Tahoe joined the search on 21 August, and the cutter Aurora began the next day. On the 23d, Aylwin and the other ships, sailing in a scouting line, searched for the overdue full-rigged ship Pacific Queen. Although they did not find either vessel, it seems that neither was lost, since both appeared on merchant vessel registers for some years thereafter. In fact, the latter—bearing her original name, Balclutha—serves as a floating museum berthed in San Francisco, California.

Aylwin operated in the southern California area until sailing on 16 April 1937 for the Hawaiian Islands to participate in Fleet Problem XVIII. Forming up with the "Hilo Detachment" on the 21st, Aylwin conducted a mock bombardment of Hilo, Hawaii before deploying to screen USS Houston and USS Ranger as they covered a simulated landing. Putting into Pearl Harbor on 25 April, Aylwin got underway on 4 May as part of the "White" Force.

Rated as "damaged" in an initial phase of the action on 8 May, Aylwin shaped course to rendezvous with "friendly" units that morning and drove off two "strafing" attacks by "Black" planes en route. She sighted what appeared to be the "White" battle line at 06:40 and altered course to join, but discovered that the ships were, in fact, counted as "out of action."

Thus now virtually "alone", Aylwin came about and headed for Lahaina, Hawaii. The beleaguered ship found no solace en route, however, for she spotted three fast minelayers closing from six miles away, and after identifying them as "enemy", went to general quarters at 07:30, "opening fire" three minutes later. However, the umpires quickly declared her hors de combat so she joined her "out of action" consorts soon thereafter.

Aylwin returned to San Diego on 28 May 1937 and, after two weeks of upkeep alongside USS Whitney, resumed her training schedule. During the last days of June, she operated in company with USS Mississippi as that ship conducted battle practice off Santa Barbara Island in company with the radio-controlled, high-speed target ship USS Lamberton.

=== 1938 ===
For the rest of 1937 and the winter months of early 1938, Aylwin maintained what had become standard routine, alternating periods in port for upkeep with time training at sea in the southern California operating area. From 6 to 9 January 1938, she participated in the search for a lost patrol plane from Patrol Squadron 7 (VP-7). After firing antiaircraft practices in early February, the ship proceeded to the Destroyer Base, San Diego, for her yearly hull inspection in the floating drydock USS ARD-1 and then proceeded to the Mare Island Navy Yard for a brief overhaul.

Following those repairs, Aylwin arrived at San Diego on the 6th, just in time to participate in Fleet Problem XIX. The "Black" Fleet put to sea from San Diego at 03:25 on 15 March. As part of the "White" Fleet, Aylwin got underway at 1640 and soon joined the remainder of Destroyer Flotilla 1 and the aircraft carrier USS Ranger.

Searching for the enemy "main body" on the 17th, she fell in with USS Chicago, USS Quincy, USS Chester and USS Portland on the following morning. That afternoon, the cruisers made contact, attacked, and retired under cover of a smoke screen. Aylwin regained sight of the "enemy" and took up a position a safe distance astern to trail them through the 19th.

After fueling from USS Idaho on the 20th, the destroyer conducted exercises in subsequent phases of Fleet Problem XIX until supporting a mock landing at Lahaina; at the outset, she lay-to between the islands of Molokai, Lanai, and Maui before standing in toward the "beachhead" to support the landing of troops. She conducted a brief minesweeping drill before refueling from USS Brazos and then anchoring at Lahaina Roads for a brief respite.

From 4 to 8 April, Aylwin again was underway participating in further exercises before putting into Pearl Harbor. When the fleet sortied on the morning of the 18th, she ranged ahead of the departing battleships alert for possible "submarine" activity. Ultimately, Aylwin participated in the closing phases of Fleet Problem XIX, which had been conducted in three separate phases, each a small fleet problem in itself. As in Fleet Problem XVII, the exercises also tested the ability of the fleet to seize and hold advanced bases, indicating the Navy's Pacific-minded planning.

The destroyer returned to San Diego on 28 April and, on 9 May, resumed her coastwise training schedule. She underwent brief upkeep alongside Whitney before getting underway on 21 June for the Pacific Northwest and cruising along the coast through July, touching at such places as Port Angeles, Washington; Ketchikan, Territory of Alaska; Humpback Bay, Wrangell Narrows, Taku Inlet, Yakutat Bay, Sitka, Seattle; and finally, Portland, Oregon. She returned via San Francisco to San Diego in mid-August, underwent tender upkeep alongside Whitney, and conducted training off the southern California coast before getting underway on 26 September for Hawaii.

Reaching Pearl Harbor on 2 October, Aylwin underwent repairs and alterations there through November. She arrived back at San Diego on 12 December and conducted training exercises off the South Coronados Island of Mexico before ending the year 1938 berthed in a destroyer nest in San Diego harbor.

=== 1939 ===
Four days into 1939, Aylwin got underway for Panama and reached Balboa on 13 January. After transiting the Panama Canal the next day, she operated out of Gonaïves, Haiti; Guantánamo Bay, Cuba; and, Port-au-Prince, Haiti, before getting underway on the 13th for her initial station during Fleet Problem XX.

These exercises took place in the Caribbean and arrayed the Battle Force against the Scouting Force.

After fueling from Maryland on 17 February, Aylwin operated with Lexington and Enterprise which acted as a raiding force during one phase of the problem. Ultimately, the "battle" reached its conclusion, the fleet battle. The forces then all retired to Culebra Bay, Puerto Rico, where President Franklin D. Roosevelt reviewed them from the deck of Houston on the last day of February.

After visiting Cienfuegos and Guantánamo Bay, Cuba, Aylwin operated briefly out of Gonaïves before returning to Guantanamo on 31 March. She got underway on 8 April for Yorktown, Virginia, and, en route north, acted as plane guard for Lexington. Aylwin reached Yorktown on 12 April, but the Fleet's visit to that area was soon cut short by orders to return to the Pacific.

Underway at 04:04 on 20 April, Aylwin took station with the rest of her division around the carriers. She planeguarded for USS Yorktown en route to Panama; transited the Canal on 29 April; and, after tarrying briefly at Balboa, got underway for San Diego on 2 May. Reaching her home port on the 12th, the destroyer operated off southern California before entering the Mare Island Navy Yard on 18 June for repairs and alterations lasting until 8 October. She got underway on the morning of 11 October, bound once more for Hawaii.

The Navy formed a "Hawaiian Detachment" under Vice Admiral Adolphus Andrews and based it at Pearl Harbor—a step foreshadowing the basing of the entire Fleet there the following spring.

Aylwin arrived at Pearl Harbor on 18 October 1939 and, over the next few months, alternated periods in port at "Pearl" with varied exercises in the Hawaiian operating area.

=== 1940 ===
In the spring of 1940, Aylwin, as a unit of the "maroon" fleet, participated in Fleet Problem XXI, the last pre-war fleet problem. Indicative of the Fleet's security-mindedness at that time, Aylwin alternated with other destroyers conducting "security patrols" off the port of Honolulu and off Pearl Harbor's entrance during the course of the evolutions, investigating all vessels sighted, including small fishing craft.

Detachments from the Fleet were rotated back to the west coast at intervals. Aylwin thus returned briefly to the west coast during the summer of 1940, reaching San Diego on 9 July before shifting to the Mare Island Navy Yard on the 14th. She underwent repairs and alterations there until 22 September before returning, via San Diego, to Pearl Harbor on 21 October.

=== 1941 ===
From that port, Aylwin maintained her normal routine into the critical year 1941. On 7 February 1941, she put to sea and, after rendezvousing with aircraft carrier Enterprise and sister destroyer USS Farragut, headed back to the west coast for a brief visit. They arrived at San Diego on 13 February, but turned around again two days later and rejoined Enterprise—which was ferrying a shipment of the latest Army fighter aircraft to Hawaii. The three ships reached Oahu on 21 February.

On 17 March, Aylwin left Pearl Harbor for off-shore patrol and exercises. Two days later, the ship conducted a two-hour night tactical exercise on a dark, moonless night, commencing at 20:00. At its conclusion, all destroyers were directed to proceed to a rendezvous astern of the fleet's center. At 22:51, Aylwin turned on her running and fighting lights and sighted a ship materializing out of the murk on her port bow. Aylwin maintained her course and speed until backing emergency full at 23:03. At that point, the other ship, Farragut, loomed on a collision course and also backed to avoid contact. Shortly after 23:04, Farragut's bow sliced into Aylwin's port side at a 90-degree angle, causing extensive damage for about 23 frames and nearly severing Aylwin's bow.

A fire immediately blazed up as high as Aylwin's masthead, illuminating the two ships and quickly spread aft through the wardroom and into the area occupied by the ships officers' cabins. Aylwin's electrical installation burned with intense heat until controlled at 0140 on the 20th. Fire parties from Dale, USS Stack, USS Philadelphia, and USS Sterett all contributed men to help contain the blaze; and a party from Indianapolis joined the one from Philadelphia in assessing the damage and making temporary repairs.

USS Detroit attempted to tow Aylwin back to Pearl Harbor but the cable parted. USS Turkey soon picked up the damaged destroyer and towed her to port stern first. Following extensive repairs in drydock, Aylwin resumed her operations in the Hawaiian waters. After conducting her last peacetime training late in November, she moored to buoy X-14 at 13:47 on the 28th, and remained there into the first week of December.

== World War II ==
As Aylwin lay moored in a nest with her squadron mates on the morning of 7 December 1941, one small boiler was in operation to provide enough power for auxiliary services on board. Approximately half of her men were enjoying leave and liberty that weekend. At 07:55 that Sunday morning, shortly before morning colors, the sound of airplane engines surprised Aylwin's men and countless other sailors. At that time, Japanese planes torpedoed the target ship USS Utah moored to a quay off Ford Island.

Three minutes later, Aylwin returned fire. At 08:00, the "black gang" lit fires under two boilers, cutting them in on her main steam line within 15 minutes. At 08:29, Commander, Destroyers Battle Force directed his ships to get underway. At about 08:50, a Japanese plane dropped a bomb that exploded some 75 yards off Aylwin's starboard bow. Eight minutes later, Aylwin, leaving her stern wire and anchor chain behind, headed for the channel and the open sea.

The destroyer, manned by 50% of her crew under the direction of four ensigns—the senior officer, Ensign Stanley B. Caplan, USNR, had served at sea for only some eight months—proceeded out of Pearl Harbor, stripping ship for war and simultaneously maintaining a "continuous fire." Her machine gunners claimed to have downed at least three aircraft; but, in the light of the tremendous volume of antiaircraft fire from all ships, her "kills" cannot be proven conclusively.

As Aylwin raced out to sea, those men topside who chanced to look astern beheld a curious sight; her captain, Lt. CDR. Robert H. Rodgers, and other officers, in a motor launch about 1,000 yards off the entrance buoys. Nevertheless, in view of ComDesRon 1's instructions, Aylwin could not slow down, but instead headed out to sea for patrol duty, leaving most of her officers orphans on board the old flushdecker USS Chew.

A little less than a half hour later, Aylwin investigated a reported submarine sighting, but found nothing. During the patrol, the destroyer vibrated abnormally because of a screw damaged soon after she got underway when a bomb explosion near her starboard quarter threw her stern into a buoy.

Late on the afternoon of 8 December, Aylwin followed the Enterprise task force into Pearl Harbor and picked up Rodgers and the division commander, CDR. R. S. Riggs, on the way into the channel. The next day, Aylwin got underway and conducted antisubmarine patrols in sector 2, off the entrance to Pearl Harbor. She made a sound contact on 10 December. After going to general quarters, she dropped a five-charge pattern, but with no confirmed damage. Entering Pearl Harbor again on the 11th, Aylwin underwent repairs to her damaged propeller.

On 12 December, after the smoke over Oahu had cleared, CDR. Rodgers heaped praise on his abbreviated crew for their actions in the first flush of war: "The conduct of the personnel was magnificent.... Every man more than did his job and was eager to fight." Of Ensign Caplan, Rodgers wrote, "The conduct (of this man) ... in superbly taking command for 36 hours during war operations of the severest type is a most amazing and outstanding achievement."

Aylwin sortied as part of the Lexington task force headed to relieve Wake Island on 14 December. Along with the heavy cruisers Chicago and Portland and the destroyer USS Phelps, she took station ahead of Lexington. The next day, destroyers Dewey and Worden, the cruiser Indianapolis, and the oiler Neosho joined the force.

Two Japanese carriers had joined the forces attacking Wake. This move prompted cancellation of the relief attempt. Wake fell on 23 December.

After investigating several suspected submarine contacts en route, Aylwin covered the arrival of TF 11 at Pearl Harbor three days after Christmas. On the last day of 1941, Aylwin sortied from Pearl Harbor in the screen of a convoy taking evacuees from the Hawaiian Islands to the west coast where she served five days into 1942.

=== 1942 ===
Aylwin then underwent repairs and alterations in the Mare Island Navy Yard until 10 January, receiving new 20-millimeter machine guns to increase her close-in antiaircraft capability. Two days later, she sailed with USS Perkins to escort the liners President Coolidge, President Monroe, and Mariposa to San Francisco. Underway again on the 17th, Aylwin and Perkins escorted a convoy consisting of USS Neosho, USS Castor, USS Pyro, and USS Crescent City back to Oahu where they arrived on the 25th.

On the last day of January, the destroyer sortied with TF 11, formed around Lexington, and performed plane-guard duties for that carrier as she moved southwestward toward New Guinea. After accidentally firing a live torpedo in Hull's direction during surface attack maneuvers on 13 February, Aylwin warned her sister ship by blinker, enabling the latter to sheer away out of danger. Aylwin followed the errant "fish" at 28 knots until it sank at the end of a normal run.

Three days later, the ANZAC command cruiser force— USS Chicago, HMNZS Leander, HMNZS Achilles, and HMAS Australia, screened by Lamson and USS Perkins—pulled into sight. As the destroyers formed a circular screen, the heavy ships hove to and transferred officers for a conference. Shortly thereafter, TF 11 reformed and assumed a northwesterly course toward Bougainville Island and the Bismarck Archipelago.

Before a raid against the key Japanese base at Rabaul could be launched, Japanese reconnaissance planes discovered the task force. Accordingly, 17 land-based Mitsubishi G4M bombers set out from Rabaul, New Britain.

Lexington's radar picked up the incoming bombers at 10:30, and the task force increased speed to 21 knots. During the defense of the carrier, Lt. Edward H. "Butch" O'Hare reportedly downed five or six enemy planes in about as many minutes.

While Lexington's F4F Wildcats were fighting above, the ships' gunners were firing antiaircraft guns. Aylwin's spotters noted one enemy bomber falling in flames after bursts from their ship had exploded in its vicinity. Then, when a second wave attempted to breach the screen of the task force, Aylwin's 20-millimeter guns downed an enemy bomber attempting to crash into the stern of nearby Bagley. The remaining bombers returned to Rabaul. No ship in the Lexington formation was damaged.

However, since it had been discovered, the American force retired from the area. Aylwin soon left TF 11 to escort the fleet oiler USS Platte to Pago Pago, Samoa, and then back to Pearl Harbor, reaching port on 8 March.

Two days later, Aylwin began screening the 18 ships of convoy 4072 from Honolulu to San Francisco Bay where they arrived on 22 March. Following repairs at the Mare Island Navy Yard, she sortied on the 31st as part of the screen for Hawaii-bound convoy 2054.

Reaching Pearl Harbor on 12 April, Aylwin returned to sea on the 15th with TF 11. En route to the South Pacific on the 18th, Lexington flew off a squadron of 14 Marine Brewster F2A-3's (the reconstituted VMF-211) to Palmyra Island.

Meanwhile, intelligence reported a substantial enemy movement toward New Guinea and Australia, probably aimed at strategic Port Moresby. Accordingly, on 26 April, Lexington and her screen received orders to rendezvous with Task Force 17 (TF17) on 1 May. When they met that morning, the two forces came under the latter's commander, Rear Admiral Frank Jack Fletcher, in Yorktown. Aylwin was assigned to Lexington's plane guard.

On 7 May, Aylwin received word that an enemy force of two carriers and four cruisers was some 200 miles distant. At 09:55, Aylwin observed Lexington launch fighters and torpedo planes for the attack. Shortly thereafter, Yorktown's aircraft also took to the air.

On the 8th, Aylwin had been at general quarters since 0844 and, when enemy planes were reported closing two hours later, took station between the heavy cruisers USS Chester and USS New Orleans, 3,000 yards from Yorktown. She maintained that position during the ensuing battle, conforming her movements to those of Yorktown.

Yorktown was damaged, as was Lexington, the latter fatally. After an SBD-3 of Scouting Squadron 5 (VS-5) ditched near Aylwin, the destroyer altered course to pick up the pilot, Ens. J. H. Jorgenson, USNR, and his rear-seat man, Radioman 3d Class A. W. Brunetti.

The task force retired from the scene of battle toward the Tonga Islands. While alongside New Orleans to refuel two days later, Aylwin rigged breeches buoys forward and aft, and took on board 37 officers and 92 enlisted men from Lexington and one Yorktown pilot, Lt. (jg.) E. S. McCuskey, of VF-2, who would later become an "ace" in the Battle of Midway. The destroyer cast off and resumed her screening duties.

On the morning of 15 May, Aylwin drew alongside Yorktown, and transferred charts of the Tonga Islands to the carrier. Less than an hour later, while the carrier's planes flew protective cover, TF 17 entered Nukualofa Harbor, Tongatapu, where Aylwin transferred her passengers to Portland while fueling from the heavy cruiser. She then served as channel entrance guard until relieved by USS Anderson the following day.

In turn relieving USS Hammann on the morning of the 17th, Aylwin patrolled off the entrance to the harbor during the sortie of TF 17 from Nukuʻalofa and then joined USS Astoria in escorting transport USS Barnett—carrying Lexington survivors gathered from all rescue ships of the task force—on the first leg of her voyage back to the west coast of the United States. Later that day, after Burnett suffered an engine casualty, Aylwin remained with the transport until she completed the repairs. Six days later, TF 17 reached Pearl Harbor.

The following day, 28 May, Aylwin got underway to sortie in the screen of Enterprise and USS Hornet as those carriers proceeded to waters north of Midway await a Japanese armada. On 4 June, she participated in the Battle of Midway.

On 11 June, Aylwin broke off from Hawaii-bound TF 16 to escort oiler USS Kaskaskia northward toward the Aleutian Islands to fuel the warships of TF 8. Over the next five days, the two ships proceeded through foggy and rainy weather until meeting USS Humphreys and USS Gilmer on 16 June. Aylwin screened while the older "flush-deckers" fueled from Kaskaskia.

The following day, Aylwin joined TF 8 which included heavy cruiser USS Louisville, three light cruisers, and six destroyers. But for two escort runs to Women's Bay, Kodiak Island, Alaska, she worked with that task force until getting underway on 10 July to escort Kaskaskia back to the Hawaiian Islands. On the 13th, the oiler transferred her remaining fuel to USS Guadalupe and the two ships reached Oahu four days later. The destroyer spent the remainder of July in the Pearl Harbor Navy Yard undergoing repairs.

Aylwin completed her post-repair trials and then departed Pearl Harbor on 2 August to screen the escort carrier USS Long Island which had embarked the marine air units earmarked to operate from the airfield on Guadalcanal after its capture.

On 7 August, as Aylwin and her charge headed across the Pacific, the marines of the 1st Marine Division went ashore on Guadalcanal, Tulagi, and Gavutu.

On the 8th, a Japanese cruiser force destroyed four Allied heavy cruisers and damaged a fifth in the Battle of Savo Island. That news, combined with the withdrawal of the three carriers supporting Operation Watchtower, prompted orders on the 10th for Aylwin and her charge to put into Suva, Fiji, to fuel and there await further instructions.

Aylwin and Long Island reached Suva on 13 August, covered on the last leg of their voyage by a PBY flying boat. The "further orders" came soon enough, directing the destroyer and the carrier to the New Hebrides. They arrived at Vila Harbor, Efate, during the forenoon watch on 17 August. Reaching Mele Bay, Efate, on the 17th, the ships soon received their new sailing directions. On the following afternoon, Aylwin, USS Dale, and USS Helena got underway to screen Long Island during the carrier's passage to Guadalcanal.

Two days later, the squadron arrived back at Efate, where USS Cimarron replenished Aylwin. Over the ensuing days, the destroyer conducted offshore patrols at Efate before receiving orders on 30 August to escort Long Island to Espiritu Santo to embark survivors of the sunken destroyer USS Tucker (DD-374)—which had struck a mine.

After refueling at Pago Pago, Samoa, on 6 September, Aylwin met USS Conyngham, USS Raleigh, and USS Wharton off Canton Island on 11 September and screened the latter as that transport disembarked troops there.

Forming TG 15.4, Aylwin and Conyngham shepherded Wharton, via Suva, toward Nouméa before Aylwin was directed on the 18th to proceed to Tongatapu to join USS North Carolina for duty and to escort that torpedo-damaged battleship back to Pearl Harbor for repairs. Late on the afternoon of the 30th, she and Dale safely reached Hawaiian waters with their charge; and Aylwin moored alongside USS Dixie for upkeep.

Aylwin spent most of October training in Hawaiian waters and then escorted a convoy to Espiritu Santo which she reached on 7 November.

Because of Japanese submarine activity in the Santa Cruz Islands, Aylwin arrived at Vanikoro Island on the 10th to protect USS Ballard. After protecting that seaplane tender, four days later, she escorted Ballard to Vanua Levu to pick up sick Army coastwatchers before returning to Espiritu Santo for fuel from the oiler USS Tappahannock.

During a brief patrol out of Espiritu Santo, Aylwin developed trouble in her steering engine. Once repaired, the ship conducted channel entrance patrols there, before joining USS Russell in planeguarding USS Nassau between 19 and 22 November.

After reaching Nouméa, Aylwin escorted the damaged battleship USS South Dakota from Tongatapu before refueling at Bora Bora, in the Society Islands, on 1 December. The destroyer then steamed to California, and underwent repairs at the Mare Island Navy Yard into the new year. She departed San Francisco on 8 January 1943, bound for Alaska in company with USS Bancroft and Dale, and arrived at Dutch Harbor five days later. Over the next three months, Aylwin conducted escort missions in the Aleutians.

=== 1943 ===
Shifting southward, she then worked with Nassau during flight training before shifting north to Dutch Harbor to take part in the invasion of Attu. The landings commenced on 11 May 1943.

Some two months later, Aylwin shelled antiaircraft gun positions on Kiska on the night of 8 and 9 July. The destroyer made two passes at that island. She subsequently bombarded the enemy's main camp on Kiska on the evening of 2 August, unaware that shortly before—on 28 July—the Japanese had evacuated their entire force.

Departing Adak on 31 August, Aylwin steamed to San Francisco and remained in the Bay area through mid-October. Leaving the west coast on the 19th, the destroyer served as part of the screen for the escort carriers USS Sangamon, USS Chenango, and USS Suwannee as they sailed toward the New Hebrides and arrived at Espiritu Santo on 5 November.

From mid-November through the first week of December 1943, Aylwin screened carriers Sangamon and Suwannee during the operations to capture the Gilbert Islands. Detached on 8 December, she joined USS Bailey (DD-492) in escorting USS Maryland to Pearl Harbor where they arrived on the 14th. She then helped to screen that battleship along with Tennessee and Colorado to San Francisco which they reached four days before Christmas.

=== 1944 ===
Following repairs at Alameda, California, Aylwin picked up a convoy of tank landing ships and motor minesweepers at San Diego to escort to Hawaii. After tarrying at Kauai between 16 and 20 January 1944, she moved on to the Marshall Islands, reaching Kwajalein on the last day of the month. But for a run to Majuro and back between 8 and 11 February, she served there until shifting to Eniwetok on the 21st to join USS Hall, MacDonough, and Monaghan in delivering fire support that night on Parry Island.

The destroyer then reported to Commander, Southern Screen, for duty. Steaming back to Kwajalein on 26 February, Aylwin patrolled off Eniwetok and Majuro through mid-March as mop-up operations continued at those places. She was assigned next to TG 58.2, including USS Bunker Hill, USS Hornet, USS Monterey, and USS Cabot. On 30 March, the Fast Carrier Task Force commenced intensive bombing of Japanese airfields, shipping, fleet servicing facilities, and other installations in the Carolines, continuing the raids until 1 April. Aylwin helped to drive off planes during the approach of the carriers on the 29th and 30th and, at 13:43 on the latter day, sighted a damaged Curtiss SB2C "Helldiver" from Bunker Hill's air group ditch a short way off. The destroyer altered course and soon thereafter picked up the pilot and his radioman.

Returning to Majuro to replenish, Aylwin sortied once more on 13 April in the screen of Rear Admiral Alfred E. Montgomery's TG 58.2, bound for waters off New Guinea to support Army landings at Aitape, Tanahmerah Bay, and Humboldt Bay, from 21 April through the 24th. Aylwin returned to Majuro on 4 May for tender repairs alongside USS Prairie which ended on the 21st.

After screening Bunker Hill and Cabot during training in late May and early June, the veteran destroyer departed Majuro on 6 June bound for the Marianas Islands in company with TF 58. On the 12th, the planes from the carriers bombed air facilities and coast defenses in the Marianas and damaged two Japanese convoys.

On the 13th, Aylwin was part of the Northern Bombardment Unit (TU 58.7.2) which shelled defense positions on the northern coast of Saipan and also served in the antisubmarine screen for the battleships Alabama and South Dakota. When the shelling ended at 17:15, she rejoined the carriers and guarded them as they refueled the next day. During that operation, the destroyer received orders to rescue a pair of Bunker Hill aviators and, less than an hour later, picked up Ens. G. W. Snediker, USNR, and Aviation Radioman 3d Class R. E. Lincoln, USNR. The destroyer made another rescue on the 16th while covering the cruiser bombardment of Guam when a plane piloted by Ens. F. P. Kleffner, USNR, crashed 1800 yards astern.

On the 17th, Aylwin was ordered to help screen the transports, and she missed the Battle of the Philippine Sea on the 19th and 20th which almost wiped out Japanese carrier-based aviation. Aylwin next proceeded to Eniwetok where she arrived on 28 June for a fortnight's upkeep.

Aylwin screened USS Wichita and USS St. Louis as those cruisers shelled installations on Guam on 18 and 19 July before taking part in a bombardment of the northern shores of the island, concentrating her fire on Japanese defensive positions near Asan Beach.

At the outset of the mission, Dewey and two LCI's provided harassing fire into that area. USS Minneapolis and Dewey stood in close to the beach, lying close to Adelup Point and covered the night beach obstruction demolition work of underwater demolition teams (UDTs), screened to seaward by Aylwin, Dale, and USS Dickerson.

Aylwin relieved Dewey on station on 21 July, off Asan Beach. Dale in turn relieved Aylwin on station.

Relieved at 05:30, Aylwin and her colleagues retired to the transport screen northwest of Orote Point and Agana Bay. On 25 and 26 July, the destroyer screened a cruiser bombardment of Rota Island and departed the area on the 30th, bound for Eniwetok on the first leg of a voyage home. Aylwin stopped at Pearl Harbor from 9 to 11 August and reached Bremerton, Washington, on the 17th for an overhaul.

Aylwin then went down the coast with USS Colorado and Farragut, reached San Pedro on 10 October, and set out for Hawaii the next day. Aylwin then trained in Hawaiian waters until 11 November, when she sailed for the western Pacific in company with USS Baltimore, USS San Juan, and three destroyers. She reached Ulithi on 21 November and operated between there and the Philippines into the first week of December 1944.

On 10 December, Aylwin—flagship of Commander TG 30.8 (a replenishment group) left Ulithi as the 3rd Fleet put to sea. Three days later, Aylwin rendezvoused with TF 38 and, upon completion of fueling operations early the following afternoon, cleared the area.

On the morning of the 17th, TG 30.8 joined TF 38 and again commenced fueling. However, the weather soon began growing worse as a typhoon came into the Philippine Sea.

After Aylwin rolled 70 degrees to port for the first time, her engines were ordered to be stopped. Two men were swept overboard and lost.

A leak in the engine room at 19:30 drew all pumps into action. Aylwin survived the typhoon, but other ships had not fared so well. The storm claimed Hull, Monaghan, and Spence, each with heavy loss of life.

Her flooding under control, Aylwin arrived at Ulithi three days before Christmas. There, she received repairs alongside USS Markab that lasted into January 1945. While at Ulithi, Aylwin conducted a brief patrol of the harbor after an explosion in USS Mazama—believed to have been caused by a submarine torpedo—but found no evidence of submarine activity.

=== 1945 ===
The destroyer continued her operations as screen for replenishment groups into February 1945. As part of the screen of TG 50.8, she—together with USS Crowley, USS Weaver, USS Suamico, USS Shasta, and USS Wrangell reached Iwo Jima on 21 February. She then began protecting the transports. On 23 February, Aylwin was assigned to TF 54, the fire support group, and relieved USS Tuscaloosa.

By that time, marines had occupied the southern section of Iwo Jima and were advancing to the north. On 23 and 24 February, Aylwin engaged in the Battle of Iwo Jima, before she left on the 25th for a fueling rendezvous en route back to Ulithi where she arrived on the 28th.

During the first phase of the invasion of Okinawa, Aylwin operated between Kerama Retto and Ulithi. In early April, she endured her second typhoon on 5 June 1945.

Aylwin rendezvoused with the storm-damaged USS Pittsburgh which had lost her bow in the storm. She subsequently searched unsuccessfully for the damaged warship's severed bow before putting into Apra Harbor, Guam, on 10 June for repairs.

On 6 July, she got underway to return to the Carolines and reached Ulithi on the next. She sortied on the 10th as an escort for Convoy UOK-39 and safely saw her 41 charges to Okinawa.

After returning to Ulithi with another convoy, Aylwin began steaming off the anchorage on picket station B-6 at 16:40 on 3 August. The next morning, she received orders to search for survivors of the torpedoed Indianapolis. The destroyer located and examined three bodies, removing all identification materials and fingerprinting them before burying them at sea.

Underway again on 13 August, Aylwin escorted a convoy of troopships to the Marianas, reaching Apra Harbor on 14 August. When Japan surrendered the following day, Aylwin was at Apra Harbor.

Three days later, the destroyers got underway for the Hawaiian Islands, in company with MacDonough and Rudyerd Bay, and reached Pearl Harbor soon thereafter. On 27 August, Aylwin embarked passengers and, the following day, sailed for the California coast. The veteran destroyer disembarked her passengers at San Diego and, after tarrying there from 3 to 11 September, got underway for Panama and the east coast of the United States.

== Decommissioning ==
Transiting the canal for the last time on 20 September, Aylwin reached New York City on 25 September. Decommissioned at the New York Navy Yard on 16 October 1945, Aylwin was struck from the Navy List on 1 November 1945. Stripped for disposal, her hull was sold and delivered to George N. Nutman, Inc., of Brooklyn, N.Y. on 20 December 1946 and cut up for scrap by 2 September 1948.

Aylwin received 13 battle stars for her World War II service.
