= USS Monaghan (DD-354) =

Farragut-class destroyer

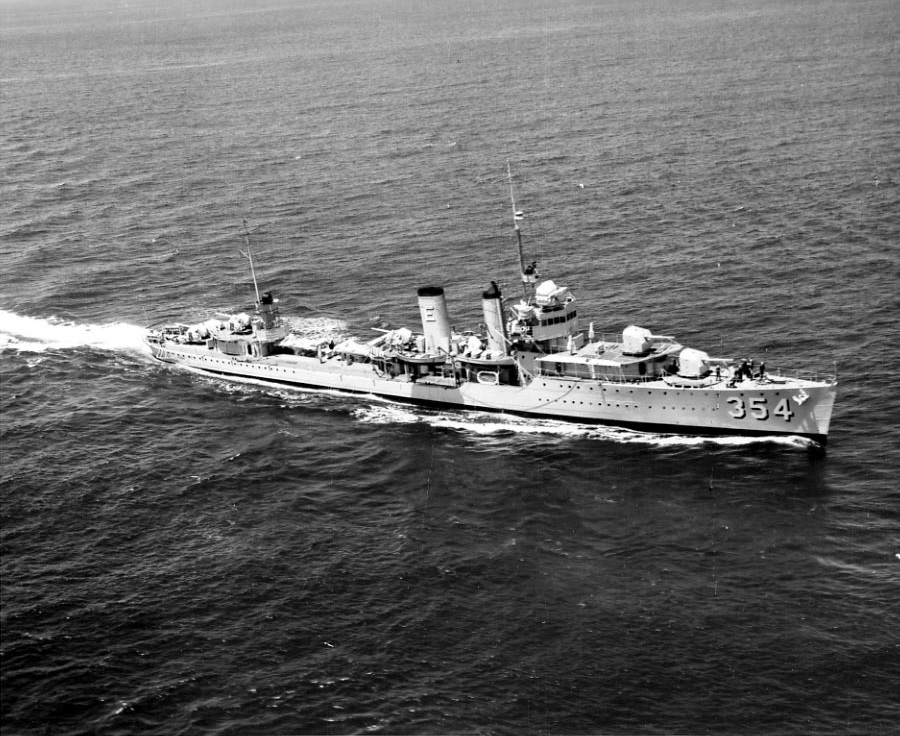
- USS Monaghan (DD-354)

History

United States
- Name: Monaghan (DD-354)
- Namesake: John R. Monaghan
- Builder: Boston Navy Yard
- Laid down: 21 November 1933
- Launched: 9 January 1935
- Commissioned: 19 April 1935
- Honours and awards: 12 × battle stars
- Fate: Foundered in Typhoon Cobra, 18 December 1944

General characteristics
- Class & type: Farragut-class destroyer
- Displacement: 1,500 tons
- Length: 341 ft 3 in (104.01 m)
- Beam: 34 ft 3 in (10.44 m)
- Draft: 8 ft 10 in (2.69 m)
- Speed: 36.5 kn (67.6 km/h)
- Complement: 100 officers and enlisted
- Armament: As Built: 5 × 5"(127mm)/38cal DP (5x1), 8 × 21 inch (533 mm) T Tubes (2x4), 4 × .50cal (12.7mm) MG AA (4x1); c1943: 1 × Mk 33 Gun Fire Control System; 4 × 5" (127mm)/38cal DP (4x1), 8 × 21" (533 mm) T Tubes (2x4), 5 × Oerlikon 20 mm AA (5x1), 2 × Mk 51 Gun Directors; 4 × Bofors 40 mm AA (2x2), 2 × Depth Charge stern racks

USS Monaghan (DD-354) was the last ship built of the Farragut-class destroyer design. She was named for Ensign John R. Monaghan. Monaghan was laid down on 21 November 1933 at the Boston Navy Yard, and launched on 9 January 1935. She was sponsored by Miss Mary F. Monaghan, niece of Ensign Monaghan, and commissioned on 19 April 1935. During the next few years Monaghan operated primarily in the North Atlantic, training US Navy personnel who served in World War II. Monaghan was present during the Pearl Harbor raid on 7 December 1941. She participated in the Battle of the Coral Sea and the Battle of Midway in 1942. Monaghan was sunk in Typhoon Cobra east of the Philippines in 1944.

== Pearl Harbor ==
On 7 December 1941, Monaghan was a ready duty destroyer in Pearl Harbor, and at 07:51 was ordered to join Ward, who had just sunk an unidentified submarine off the entrance to Pearl Harbor an hour earlier. Four minutes later, before Monaghan could get underway, the Japanese air attack began. Monaghan opened fire, and at 08:27 was underway to join Ward when notified of the presence of a Ko-hyoteki class midget submarine in the harbor. Monaghan headed for the trespasser and the captain, LCdr. Burford, giving the order to ram. The submarine turned and fired its torpedo at the Monaghan. It missed, passing within 50 yards of the destroyer's starboard side. The Monaghan rammed the submarine glancingly, then sank it with two depth charges. Because of the shallowness of the harbor, when the depth charges detonated, the explosions lifted the Monaghan's stern out of the water. The destroyer then went out of control and smashed into a barge.

She headed on out of the harbor to patrol offshore for the next week, then joined Lexington in the attempt to relieve Wake Island, but Wake was captured by the Japanese before Lexington's force could bring aid. Homeward bound, Monaghan, with Dale and Aylwin, made repeated attacks on an enemy submarine, causing it to broach and give off a large oil slick.

Patrol and scouting operations out of Pearl Harbor with the Lexington group were followed by convoy duty to the west coast and back before Task Force 11 (TF 11), with Monaghan screening Lexington, sortied from Pearl Harbor on 15 April 1942, bound for the South Pacific. With the Japanese threatening Port Moresby, Papua New Guinea, sea lines of communication to Australia and New Zealand were in peril, and the Navy moved quickly and decisively to block so critical a threat. First action came 4 May when planes from Yorktown hit Japanese invasion shipping at Tulagi and Gavutu. The two carrier forces now combined upon word that an enemy carrier group had entered the Coral Sea. The opening action of the victory there came 7 May, when American search planes spotted the Japanese occupation force, several transports guarded by the light carrier Shōhō. Lexington and Yorktown planes sank Shōhō. Next day, before the major engagement by aircraft from both American and Japanese fleet carriers, Monaghan was ordered away from formation to transmit important messages, thus preserving radio silence in the main body. She was then ordered on to search for survivors of Neosho and Sims, sunk on the 7th by the Japanese. Since the position of the sinking had been erroneously reported, Monaghan was unable to carry out a rescue, and sailed on with messages for Nouméa before rejoining TF 16 in time to return to Pearl Harbor 26 May.

== Battle of Midway ==
Two days later, Monaghan was underway for the decisive battle of the war, the Battle of Midway. The Japanese sailed for the capture of the Midway Atoll with a complex battle plan, but U.S. naval intelligence revealed the plan to American commanders, who thus knew when and where to find the Carrier Striking Task Force of the Japanese attackers. Although outnumbered, the Americans sank four enemy carriers in air actions beginning on the night of 3 June, along with a heavy cruiser. Through the first two days, Monaghan screened Enterprise, then late on the morning of 5 June was ordered out to rescue men of a downed seaplane. At 1830 she reached the side of badly damaged Yorktown, joining the group of destroyers struggling to save the carrier and guard her from further damage. The Japanese submarine I-168 penetrated the destroyer screen the next day and sank both Yorktown and Hammann, the carrier remaining afloat another 16 hours before she succumbed. Monaghan, Gwin, and Hughes attacked and badly damaged the submarine.

== Other Pacific operations ==
After the victory, the force returned to Pearl Harbor on 13 June. Monaghan was sent north to aid in countering the Japanese threat in the Aleutians. Damaged by collision in the heavy northern fog, Monaghan repaired at Dutch Harbor and Pearl Harbor, then escorted a convoy to the west coast en route to the Mare Island Naval Shipyard at Vallejo, CA for a repair period. Monaghan returned to the South Pacific at Nandi, Fiji, 17 November. In the harbor of Nouméa she bent her propellers on an underwater obstruction, and had to return to Pearl Harbor on her hastily replaced port screw for permanent repairs, completed 21 February 1943.

Once more in the Aleutians, Monaghan joined TG 16.69 a scouting force built around cruisers Richmond and Salt Lake City. On 26 March this group engaged the Japanese in the Battle of the Komandorski Islands. Although outnumbered, the Americans fired guns and torpedoes so effectively that the Japanese were driven away. Patrol and occasional shore bombardment missions throughout the Aleutians, along with escort missions, continued through the summer. Highlights were a radar-directed surface engagement with an unidentified target 20 June, and a chase of a Japanese submarine two days later that resulted with the submarine being driven up on rocks and abandoned. She was later identified as Japanese submarine I-7, engaged in evacuating troops from Kiska.

After escort duty to Pearl Harbor and San Francisco, Monaghan sailed to San Pedro, California, to escort three new escort carriers to the Gilbert Islands operation, for which they sailed from Espiritu Santo 13 November. The escort carriers launched their planes against shore targets and protected convoys offshore through the invasion of Tarawa.

Returning to the west coast on escort duty, Monaghan rejoined the escort carriers after extensive exercises out of San Diego, California, and prepared for the invasion of the Marshalls, during which she guarded the carriers northwest of Roi as they flew air support and strikes for the landings there. On 7 February 1944 she entered Majuro, then escorted Pennsylvania to Kwajalein, where she joined the transport screen for the capture of Eniwetok. On the night of 21/22 February, she joined in an all-night bombardment on Parry Island, then spent a month on patrol and escort duty in the Marshalls.

On 22 March Monaghan put to sea in the antisubmarine screen for the fast carriers, bound for strikes on Palau, Woleai, and Yap, returning to Majuro 6 April. The next sortie, 13 April to 4 May, was to cover the Hollandia landings, and strike at Satawan, Truk, and Ponape. After preparing at Majuro, the force now sailed for the invasion of Saipan, against which the first strikes were flown 11 June. While the fliers of TF 58 soundly defeated the Japanese in the Battle of the Philippine Sea, Monaghan's group patrolled off Saipan guarding against a possible breakthrough by the enemy. They next steamed to Eniwetok to prepare for the assault on Guam, for which they sailed 14 July, Monaghan again in the antisubmarine screen protecting the carriers. Assigned to cover the work of underwater demolition teams off Agat on the night of 17/18 July, Monaghan furnished harassing fire until daylight, firing again on the island during the early morning of 19 June. She continued bombardment and screening missions until 25 July when she sailed for Pearl Harbor, and an overhaul at Puget Sound.

== Loss in a typhoon ==
After training off California and Hawaii, Monaghan sailed for Ulithi 11 November. There she joined the escort for three fleet oilers bound for a rendezvous 17 December with TF 38, whose planes had been striking central Luzon in support of the Mindoro invasion. The ship was expecting to refuel and probably had reduced its ballast in order to take on fuel. Typhoon "Cobra" hit before the Monaghan was ready to ride it out. Typhoon Cobra claimed 790 lives in the 3rd Fleet, and sank Spence, Hull, and Monaghan. Six men survived the Monaghan sinking, reportedly rescued by Brown and/or Tabberer. After drifting on a raft for three days, the men reported that Monaghan took roll after roll to starboard, finally going over. The Typhoon Cobra tragedy, Admiral Chester Nimitz said, "represented a more crippling blow to the Third Fleet than it might be expected to suffer in anything less than a major action".

Monaghan received 12 battle stars for World War II service.

== See also ==
- Typhoon Cobra (1944)
