= Farragut-class destroyer (1934) =

1934 Destroyer class of the US Navy

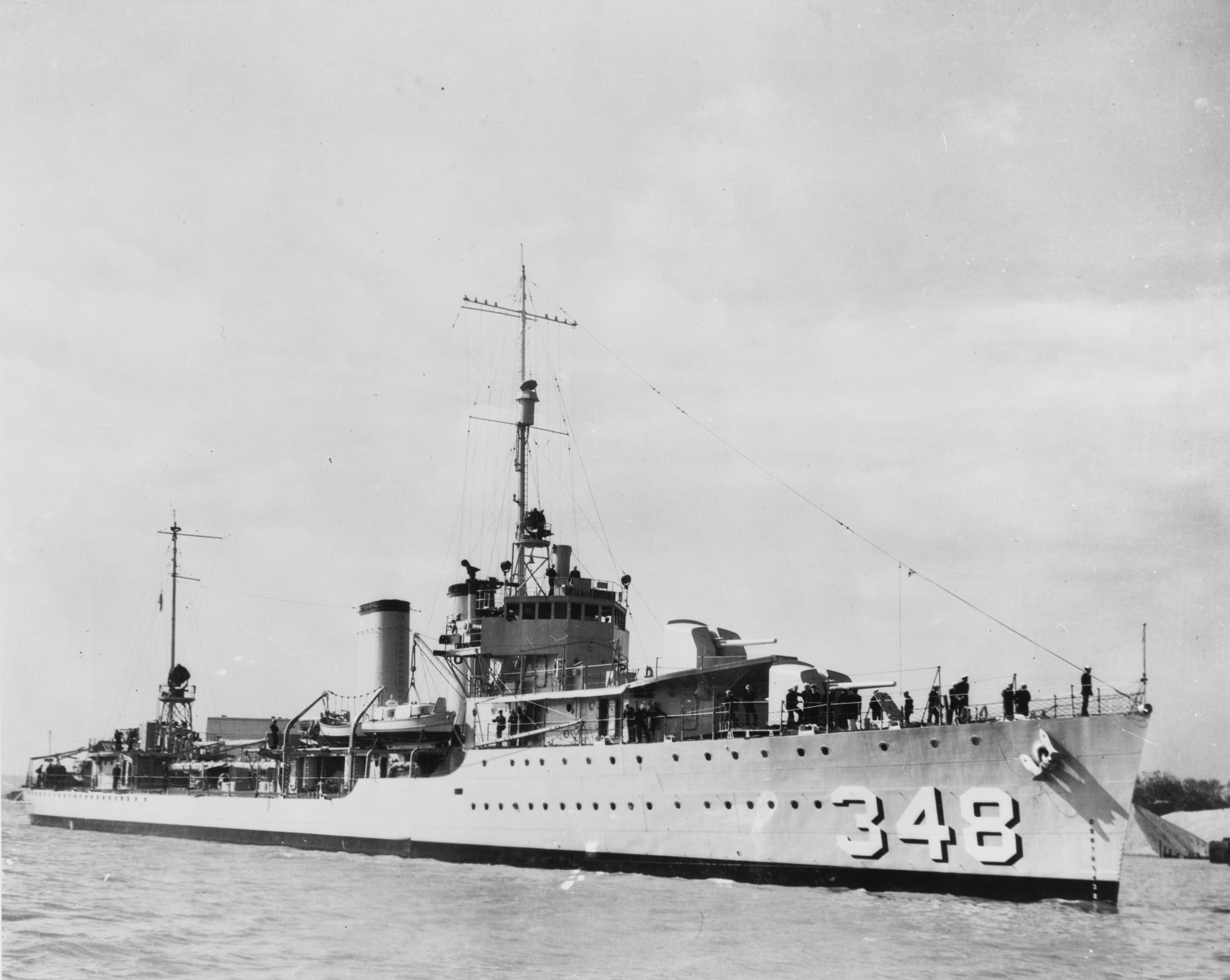
- USS Farragut in 1935

Class overview
- Name: Farragut class
- Builders: Boston Navy Yard, MA (2); Brooklyn Navy Yard, NY (2); Bethlehem Fore River, MA (1); Bath Iron Works, ME (1); Puget Sound Navy Yard, WA (1); Philadelphia Navy Yard, PA (1)
- Operators: United States Navy
- Preceded by: Clemson class
- Succeeded by: Porter class
- Built: 1932–1935
- In commission: 1934–1945
- Completed: 8
- Lost: 3
- Retired: 5

General characteristics
- Type: Destroyer
- Displacement: 1,365 tons standard; 2,064 tons full load
- Length: 341 ft 3 in (104.01 m)
- Beam: 34 ft 3 in (10.44 m)
- Draft: 16 ft 2 in (4.93 m)
- Installed power: 4 Yarrow boilers; 2 Parsons geared steam turbines; 42,800 shp (31,900 kW)
- Propulsion: 2 shafts
- Speed: 37 knots (69 km/h; 43 mph)
- Range: 5,980 nautical miles (11,070 km; 6,880 mi) at 12 kn (22 km/h; 14 mph)
- Complement: 10 officers, 150 enlisted (peacetime); 250 (wartime)
- Sensors & processing systems: Mk33 GFCS; 1 × SC radar (1943)
- Armament: As built: 5 × 5 in (127.0 mm)/38 caliber guns; 4 × .50 caliber (12.7 mm) machine guns; 8 × 21 in (533.4 mm) torpedo tubes (2 × 4), 8 torpedoes; circa 1943: 4 × 5 in (127.0 mm)/38 caliber guns; 4 × 40 mm (1.6 in) Bofors guns (2 × 2); 5 × 20 mm (0.8 in) Oerlikon cannons; 8 × 21 in (533.4 mm) torpedo tubes (2 × 4), 8 torpedoes; 4 × K-gun depth charge throwers; 2 × Depth charge stern racks

The Farragut-class destroyers were a class of eight 1,365-ton destroyers in the United States Navy and the first US destroyers of post-World War I design. Their construction, along with the Porter class, was authorized by Congress on 29 April 1916, but funding was delayed considerably. Limited to 1,500 tons standard displacement by the provisions of the London Naval Treaty of 1930, the ships were laid down beginning in 1932 and were completed by 1935. After 12 years since the last of the previous class of American destroyers (the Clemson class) was commissioned, the Farraguts were commissioned in 1934 and 1935.

These ships were slightly larger than their predecessors, faster, and they had only two stacks, versus the four stacks common to all the earlier classes. The class was the first of six classes of 1,500-ton destroyers built in the 1930s to modernize the United States Navy, and all eight Farraguts saw extensive front-line service during World War II. None were lost in battle, although only five survived the war, with two being lost to a typhoon and another to a grounding. After numerous incremental improvements, the 1,500-tonners were succeeded by the 2,100-ton Fletcher class, which was not subject to treaty restrictions.

== Design ==
The Farraguts were a considerable improvement from previous destroyers, taking advantage of technological advances during the 12-year gap in destroyer production. The impact of aircraft on naval warfare was reflected in their heavy dual-purpose main gun armament. They also had greatly improved machinery and greater fuel capacity that extended their range to 5,980 nautical miles (11,070 km; 6,880 mi) as opposed to the Clemsons' 4,900 nautical miles (9,100 km; 5,600 mi). Their larger size and improved habitability soon earned them the nickname of "goldplaters" from the crews of older destroyers.

The list of desired improvements compiled from the operational experience of the earlier Wickes and Clemson classes was both long and comprehensive. Both classes had pointed sterns that deeply dug into the water, greatly increasing turning diameter. This was addressed with the transom stern design of the Farragut class. The previous classes were flush deck designs; while providing good hull strength, this proved to be wet in high seas. This was addressed with the raised forecastle employed on the Farragut class. Cruising range on both the Wickes and Clemson classes had been a constant affliction of commanders; the Clemsons had been built with wing tanks giving better range, but at the cost of having high mounted fuel oil on both sides—a decidedly vulnerable feature in a ship without an armored belt such as a destroyer. The Farragut class corrected this range deficiency by having a design range of 5,980 nautical miles (11,070 km; 6,880 mi) as opposed to the Clemson's 4,900 nautical miles (9,100 km; 5,600 mi). Steady improvements to both boilers and steam turbines in the years between the Clemson and Farragut designs allowed this improved range, along with greater speed and a reduction from 4 to 2 stacks.

The success of the efforts become clear with the testimony of Rear Admiral Emory S. Land, head of the Bureau of Construction and Repair, to the General Board, comparing the Farragut class to the Wickes and Clemson classes. Those advantages were:

- The Farragut class was 3.3 knots faster.
- The class had double the GM height (resulting in greater initial stability).
- They had 25% more armament—5 main guns rather than 4—and about 35% greater firepower, mounting 5 in (127.0 mm)/38 caliber guns (Mark 12) as opposed to the 4 in (102 mm)/50 caliber gun (Mark 9) mounted on most previous destroyers.
- All 8 torpedo tubes were on the preferred centerline position.
- The guns were fed by power hoist from the magazines.
- Being high-freeboard vessels, sea-keeping was much improved over the flush deckers that preceded it.
- The radius of action increased by 450 nautical miles (830 km; 520 mi).

This had all been accomplished on a displacement rise of only 22%.

The Farragut-class destroyers were considered unstable in heavy weather and in turns. This was compounded by war-time modifications that made them even more top-heavy. Two of the destroyers, Hull and Monaghan, sank as a result of the December 1944 typhoon. One of the survivors stated

"The only thing I could complain about is ever since we left [Seattle] the ship seemed top heavy. I was on there for two years. Ever since we left [the shipyard] in October 1944, she seemed to roll worse than she ever did. Even in the calmest weather and even when anchored, she seemed to roll lots more than she used to."

A court of inquiry after the loss concluded that [the] basic stability of the Farragut-class ships "is materially less than other destroyers."

=== Engineering ===
The Farragut-class propulsion plant was considerably improved over the Clemson-class. Steam pressure and temperature were raised from 300 psi (2,100 kPa) saturated steam to 400 psi (2,800 kPa) steam superheated to 648 °F (342 °C). Superheated steam increased the efficiency of the turbines, improving the ships' range. This was the first use of superheaters in a US destroyer. Economizers were also fitted; these used boiler exhaust gas to preheat the feedwater before it entered the boiler; these increased the ships' range by requiring less fuel to boil the water to steam. The Farragut's turbines were Parsons-type reaction turbines manufactured by Bethlehem Steel. Each main turbine was divided into a high-pressure and a low-pressure turbine feeding into a common reduction gear to drive a shaft, in a similar manner to the machinery illustrated below and at the following reference. This general arrangement became standard for most subsequent steam-powered surface ships of the US Navy. Single-reduction gearing (as in the Clemsons) was used on the Farraguts; the Mahans and later classes had double-reduction gearing, which reduced the required size of the (then faster spinning) turbines still further.

=== Armament ===
- As built: These were the first US destroyers with a dual-purpose main armament. They received five of the then-new 5 in (127.0 mm)/38cal gun (Mark 12), installed in Mark 21 dual-purpose single mounts. The forward two mounts (numbered 51 and 52) were partially enclosed with lightly armored open-back shields. (see picture) The midships mount (No 53) and the after two mounts (numbers 54 and 55) were open. Unlike subsequent five-gun US destroyers, mount 53 was immediately aft of the stacks. An important feature was the dual-purpose Mark 33 director above the bridge, which coordinated the fire of the 5 inch guns against both ships and aircraft. By late 1942, radio proximity fuses (VT fuses) would make the guns much more effective against aircraft. Just aft of mount 53 were two trainable torpedo tube 'quad-mounts' (with four 21-inch (533 mm) tubes on each mount), one abaft the other. The class was initially equipped with the Mark 8 torpedo, which was replaced by the Mark 15 torpedo beginning in 1938. On the 02 level, aft of mount 52, there were two single .50 cal (12.7mm) machine gun (MG) mounts next to the port and starboard rails. Two more .50 cal MGs were on the main deck, midships.
- c 1943: Due to the need for greater light anti-aircraft (AA) protection that emerged following the attack on Pearl Harbor, the .50 cal MGs and Mount 53 were replaced by 20 mm and 40 mm AA weapons. The type and quantity varied from ship to ship depending on when and where they were refitted. Also, roll-off depth charge racks were added to the stern, along with four K-gun depth charge throwers. One source states the depth charge racks were added in 1936.

== Service ==
All ships were present at the attack on Pearl Harbor, where Monaghan sank a Japanese midget submarine. Three of the class were lost in the war: Worden ran aground in Alaskan waters in January 1943 and became a total loss, while Hull and Monaghan were lost in Typhoon Cobra in December 1944. The remaining five ships survived World War II; they were broken up for scrap shortly after the end of the war.

== Ships in class ==
Ships of the Farragut class
Ship Name	Hull no.	Builder	Laid Down	Launched	Commissioned	Decommissioned	Fate
Farragut	DD-348	Fore River Shipbuilding	20 September 1932	15 March 1934	18 June 1934	23 October 1945	Scrapped 1947
Dewey	DD-349	Bath Iron Works	16 December 1932	28 July 1934	4 October 1934	19 October 1945	Scrapped 1946
Hull	DD-350	Brooklyn Navy Yard	7 March 1933	31 January 1934	11 January 1935	—N/a	Lost in Typhoon Cobra, 17 December 1944
Macdonough	DD-351	Boston Navy Yard	15 May 1933	22 August 1934	15 March 1935	22 October 1945	Scrapped 1946
Worden	DD-352	Puget Sound Navy Yard	29 December 1932	27 October 1934	15 January 1935	—N/a	Grounded near Amchitka, Alaska, 12 January 1943
Dale	DD-353	Brooklyn Navy Yard	10 February 1934	23 January 1935	17 June 1935	16 October 1945	Scrapped 1946
Monaghan	DD-354	Boston Navy Yard	21 November 1933	9 January 1935	19 April 1935	—N/a	Lost in Typhoon Cobra, 17 December 1944
Aylwin	DD-355	Philadelphia Navy Yard	23 September 1933	10 July 1934	1 March 1935	16 October 1945	Scrapped 1946

== See also ==
- Farragut-class destroyer (1958)
- List of destroyer classes of the United States Navy
- List of United States Navy losses in World War II
