= USS Hull (DD-350) =

Farragut-class destroyer

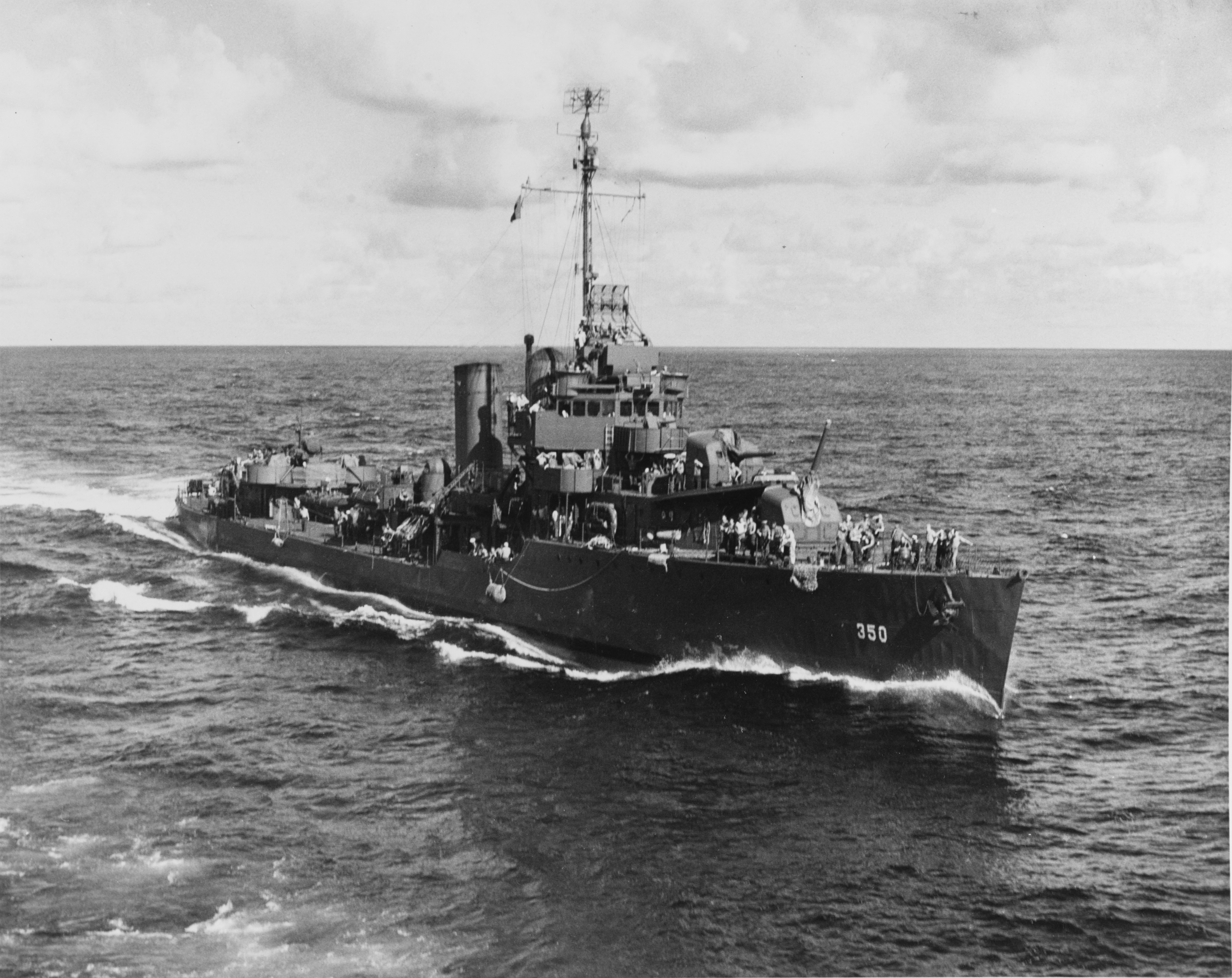
- USS Hull c. May 1944

History

United States
- Name: Hull (DD-350)
- Namesake: Isaac Hull
- Builder: New York Navy Yard
- Laid down: 7 March 1933
- Launched: 31 January 1934
- Commissioned: 11 January 1935
- Fate: Foundered in Typhoon Cobra, 18 December 1944

General characteristics
- Class & type: Farragut-class destroyer
- Displacement: 1,395 tons
- Length: 341 ft 4 in (104.04 m)
- Beam: 34 ft 3 in (10.44 m)
- Draft: 8 ft 10 in (2.69 m)
- Speed: 36 knots (67 km/h)
- Complement: 160 officers and men
- Armament: As Built: 5 × 5"(127mm)/38cal DP (5x5), 8 × 21 inch (533 mm) T Tubes (2x4), 4 × .50cal (12.7mm) MG AA (4x1); c1943: 4 × 5" (127mm)/38cal DP (4x1); 8 × 21" (533 mm) T Tubes (2x4); 5 × Oerlikon 20 mm AA (5x1); 4 × Bofors 40 mm AA (2x2); 2 × Depth Charge stern racks

USS Hull (DD-350) was a Farragut-class destroyer in the United States Navy during World War II. She was named for Isaac Hull.

Hull received 10 battle stars for World War II service, having sailed to Europe, and serving in the Pacific before and during the war in combat. After addition of equipment that made her more top-heavy, she was one of three destroyers sunk by heavy seas encountered in Halsey's Typhoon. 11 officers of the Hull, including the executive officer, and 191 enlisted sailors perished in the sea, while seven officers and 55 enlisted men were recovered.

== Construction and commissioning ==
Hull was launched by New York Navy Yard 31 January 1934; sponsored by Miss Patricia Louise Platt; and commissioned 11 January 1935.

== Pre-World War II ==
Following a shakedown cruise which took her to the Azores, Portugal, and the British Isles, Hull arrived San Diego, California, via the Panama Canal 19 October 1935. She began her operations with the Pacific Fleet off San Diego, engaging in tactical exercises and training. During the summer of 1936 she cruised to Alaska and in April 1937 took part in fleet exercises in Hawaiian waters. During this increasingly tense pre-war period, Hull often acted as plane guard to the Navy's Pacific aircraft carriers. She continued these operations until the outbreak of the war, moving to her new home port, Pearl Harbor, 12 October 1939.

== Pearl Harbor ==
The pattern of fleet problems, plane guard duty, and patrolling was interrupted 7 December 1941 when the Japanese attacked Pearl Harbor. Hull was alongside tender USS Dobbin (AD-3) undergoing repairs and put her anti-aircraft batteries into operation. As the main object of the raid was battleships and the absent aircraft carriers, the destroyer suffered no hits and departed next day to join carrier USS Enterprise (CV-6) and escort her into Pearl Harbor. During the next critical months of the war, Hull operated with Admiral Wilson Brown's Task Force 11, screening USS Lexington (CV-2) in important strikes on Japanese bases in the Solomon Islands. She returned to Pearl Harbor 26 March, and for 3 months sailed on convoy duty between San Francisco, California and Pearl Harbor. Hull was sailed 7 December for Suva, Fiji Islands, to prepare for the amphibious assault on Guadalcanal. She departed 26 July for the Solomons and on the day of the landings, 7 August 1942, screened cruisers during shore bombardment and then took up station as antisubmarine protection for the transports. Next day she helped repel bombing attacks, shooting down several planes. That evening she intentionally sank the transport George F. Elliott, burning beyond control. On 9 August the destroyer sank a small schooner off Guadalcanal, departing that evening for Espiritu Santo. During the next difficult weeks on Guadalcanal, Hull made three voyages with transports and warships in support of the troops, undergoing air attacks 9 and 14 September.

== Aleutian Islands ==
The ship returned to Pearl Harbor 20 October, and spent the remainder of the year with battleship USS Colorado (BB-45) in the New Hebrides. She sailed 29 January from Pearl Harbor bound for repairs at San Francisco, arriving 7 February 1943. Upon completion she moved to the Aleutian Islands, arriving Adak, Alaska 16 April, and began a series of training maneuvers with battleships and cruisers in the northern waters. As the Navy moved in to retake Attu in May, Hull continued her patrol duties, and during July and early August she took part in numerous bombardments of Kiska Island. The ship also took part in the landings on Kiska 15 August, only to find that the Japanese had evacuated.

== South Pacific operations ==
Hull returned to the Central Pacific after the Kiska operation, arriving Pearl Harbor 26 September 1943. She departed with the fleet 3 days later for strikes on Wake Island, and operated with escort carriers during diversionary strikes designed to mask the Navy's real objective—the Gilbert Islands. Hull bombarded Makin during this assault 20 November, and with the invasion well underway arrived in convoy at Pearl Harbor 7 December 1943. From there she returned to Oakland, California 21 December for amphibious exercises.

Next on the island road to Japan was the Marshall Islands, and Hull sailed with Task Force 53 from San Diego 13 January 1944. She arrived 31 January off Kwajalein, screening transports in the reserve area, and through February carried out screening and patrol duties off Eniwetok and Majuro. Joining a battleship and carrier group, the ship moved to Mille Atoll 18 March, and took part in a devastating bombardment. Hull also took part in the bombardment of Wotje 22 March.

The veteran ship next participated in the raid on Truk 29–30 April, after which she arrived Majuro 4 May 1944. There she joined Admiral Willis Lee's battleships for the next major invasion, the assault on the Marianas Islands. Hull bombarded Saipan 13 June, covered minesweeping operations with gunfire, and patrolled during the initial landing 15 June. Two days later Hull and other ships steamed out to join Admiral Marc Mitscher's carrier task force. The American and Japanese fleets approached each other 19 June for the biggest carrier engagement of the war, and as four large air raids hit the American dispositions fighter cover from the carriers of Hull's Task Group 58.2. With help from American submarines, Mitscher succeeded in sinking two Japanese carriers in addition to inflicting fatal losses on the Japanese naval air arm during "The Great Marianas Turkey Shoot" 19 June, Hull assisting in several of these engagements.

During July the destroyer operated with carrier groups off Guam, and after the assault 21 July patrolled off the island. In August she returned to Seattle, Washington, arriving on the 25th, and underwent repairs which kept her in the States until 23 October, when she anchored at Pearl Harbor.

== Typhoon Cobra ==
Hull was ordered to join a 3rd Fleet refueling group, departing 20 November 1944, to rendezvous with fast carrier striking forces in the Philippine Sea, at the instructions of South Pacific Commander William Halsey Jr.

Fueling operations with the fast, carrier strike-force in the Philippine Sea began on 17 December 1944, but increasingly heavy seas forced cancellation later that day. The fueling group became engulfed next day in an approaching typhoon, designated Cobra, with barometers falling to very low levels and winds increasing above 90 knots.

After Hull was ordered to change course to 140 degrees, ostensibly by Admiral Halsey "to see what they were doing," the wind increased to over 100 knots. At about 11:00 hours, on 18 December, Hull the point of sail became locked "in irons", in the trough of the mountainous sea. Unable to steer with the north wind on her port beam, yawing between 80 and 100 degrees, the whaleboat and depth charges were swept off. As the roll increased to 70 degrees, she was pinned down by a gust as the sea flooded the pilot house and poured down the stacks. All hands worked feverishly to maintain integrity and keep the ship afloat during the heavy rolls, but finally, in the words of her commander, Lt. Cmdr James A. Marks, "the ship remained over on her side at an angle of 80 degrees or more as the water flooded into her upper structures. I remained on the port wing of the bridge until the water flooded up to me, then I stepped off into the water as the ship rolled over on her way down". A later finding was that additional sea water ballast could possibly have helped the ship recover from the 70-degree roll.

Reportedly, some time before Hull became locked "in irons," some officers had debated whether to remove captain Marks from his command in order to turn the ship to a safer course, but the executive officer, Greil Gerstley, refused to do so on the grounds that there had never been a mutiny on a US Navy ship. This incident provided novelist Herman Wouk with the inspiration for the climax of his novel The Caine Mutiny, in which a captain is actually relieved of his duties by his officers in the course of Typhoon Cobra.

Rescue work by USS Tabberer and other ships of the fleet in the days that followed saved the lives of 7 officers, including the captain of the ship, and 55 enlisted sailors. 11 officers of the Hull, including the executive officer, and 191 enlisted sailors perished in the sea. In all, 790 men of the Fleet lost their lives in the typhoon.

The subsequent Court of Inquiry found that though Halsey had committed an "error of judgement" in sailing the Third Fleet into the heart of the typhoon, it stopped short of unambiguously recommending sanction. Admiral Nimitz, Commander in Chief, U.S. Pacific Fleet, presented a six-page document to the Court, stating in his conclusion, among other recommendations directed strictly to ships' commanders, that "steps must be taken to insure that commanding officers of all vessels, particularly destroyers and smaller craft, are fully aware of the stability characteristics of their ships; that adequate security measures regarding water-tight integrity are enforced; and that the effect upon stability of free liquid surfaces is thoroughly understood".

The executive officer was the father of rock journalist Greil Marcus. Years later, Marcus wrote that in December 2006 the survivors of the Hull held in Las Vegas what they determined would be their last reunion, and one of Marcus' daughters went. The people in the reunion related to his daughter, Marcus claimed, that when the original captain of Hull was told by one of the survivors that if he had still been the captain the ship would never have gone down, he shot himself.

A few weeks after the events at sea, in January 1945, Halsey passed command of the Third Fleet to Admiral Spruance (whereupon its designation changed to Fifth Fleet). Halsey took over command of the Fleet again in May 1945. In June 1945, Halsey sailed the ships into the path of yet another typhoon, designated Connie, resulting in six lives lost, and 75 airplanes destroyed, with 70 more planes badly damaged. While ships sustained crippling damages, none were lost on this occasion. A Court of Inquiry was convened and, after lengthy deliberations, recommended that Halsey be "reassigned," but Admiral Nimitz rejected the Court's recommendation on account of Halsey's "prior service" to the Navy. Halsey remained in command for approximately eight more weeks, until the cessation of hostilities on 14 August 1945. He was promoted to Fleet Admiral on 11 December 1945, and retired in March 1947.

== See also ==
- Typhoon Cobra (1944)
