= Norman Scott =

Norman Scott may refer to:

== People ==
- Norman Scott (admiral) (1889–1942), admiral in the United States Navy
- Norman Scott (bass) (1921–1968), American opera singer
- Norm Scott (1921–1957), Australian footballer for Geelong
- Norman M. Scott, Canadian figure skater
- Norman Josiffe, also known as Norman Scott, key figure in the Thorpe affair

== Other ==
- USS Norman Scott, named for the admiral
