= USS McCawley (APA-4) =

McCawley class attack vessel

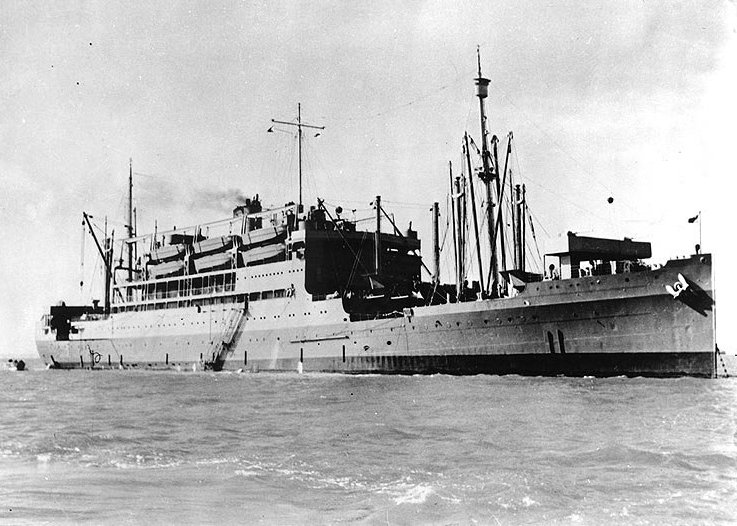
- USS McCawley circa 1941–42

History

United States
- Name: USS McCawley
- Namesake: Charles G. McCawley
- Builder: Furness Shipbuilding Company, England
- Christened: Santa Barbara
- Acquired: 26 July 1940
- Commissioned: 11 September 1940
- Renamed: McCawley, 29 July 1940
- Reclassified: AP-10 to APA-4, 1 February 1943
- Honors and awards: Five battle stars for World War II service
- Fate: Sunk off Guadalcanal, 30 June 1943

General characteristics
- Class & type: McCawley-class attack transport
- Displacement: 9,600 tons (fl)
- Length: 486 ft 6 in (148.29 m)
- Beam: 63 ft 6 in (19.35 m)
- Draft: 25 ft 6 in (7.77 m)
- Propulsion: Sulzer "DR" type drive, no boilers, 2 x propellers, designed shaft 8,000 hp (6,000 kW)
- Speed: 17 kn (31 km/h; 20 mph) (sources vary)
- Capacity: Troops: 88 Officers, 1,207 Enlisted; Cargo: 164,561 ft^{3} (4,659.8 m^{3})
- Complement: Officers 41, Enlisted 437
- Armament: 4 x 3 in (76 mm)/50 caliber dual-purpose guns; 2 x twin Bofors 40 mm guns; 18 x single Oerlikon 20 mm cannons.

USS McCawley (APA-4) was a McCawley-class attack transport that served with the United States Navy during World War II. Named after Charles G. McCawley, eighth Commandant of the U.S. Marine Corps, she was the lead ship in her class.

The second McCawley, formerly SS Santa Barbara, was completed in 1928 by the Furness Shipbuilding Company of Haverton Hill-on-Tees, England; she was acquired by the Navy from Grace Lines 26 July 1940, and renamed McCawley (AP-10) 29 July 1940. The ship was commissioned on 11 September 1940. She was reclassified as an attack transport, APA-4, on 1 February 1943.

== Service history ==
On 19 February 1942, McCawley got underway for Iceland with troops embarked. She returned to New York City on 25 March and then steamed to Norfolk, Virginia, en route a new assignment with the Pacific Fleet.

Transiting the Panama Canal on 18 April, she discharged Marine aviators at Pago Pago on 8 May and continued on to Wellington, New Zealand. Joining Amphibious Force, South Pacific, she became the flagship for Rear Admiral R. K. Turner shortly before the first Allied counterinvasion of the war, Guadalcanal.

=== Invasion of Guadalcanal ===
On 7 August, the campaign started; at 0800, landings were made at Tulagi, at 0919 on Lunga Point, Guadalcanal. Air raids commenced on 8 August; McCawley's guns scored their first kills, destroying three or possibly four planes.

==== Supply missions amid naval battles ====
On 9 August, she witnessed the flares of the Battle of Savo Island, in which American heavy cruisers Astoria, Quincy, Vincennes, and Australian heavy cruiser Canberra were lost and American heavy cruiser Chicago was severely damaged. The transports continued to unload cargo until sailing for Nouméa that afternoon.

McCawley returned to Guadalcanal on 18 September with supplies and reinforcements, departing again the same day with wounded and POWs. The aircraft carrier Wasp was lost and battleship North Carolina and destroyer O'Brien were damaged by torpedoes while protecting this troopship convoy.

On 9 October, the transport again got underway for Guadalcanal in a convoy carrying over 2,800 reinforcements. One of the support groups for the convoy was Rear Adm. Norman Scott's cruiser force, which, on the night of 11 and 12 October, defeated an enemy force off Cape Esperance, insuring successful completion of the troop movement. McCawley landed her troops and cargo, returning once more to Nouméa with wounded and POWs.

On 8 November, McCawley departed Nouméa with other units of TF 67 for Guadalcanal. Two cruisers and three destroyers under Rear Adm. Daniel J. Callaghan supported them. At the same time, another convoy, covered by a cruiser and four destroyers under Rear Admiral Scott, set out from Espiritu Santo. Further direct support for the operations was to be supplied by battleships and destroyers of TF 64.

Transports from Espiritu Santo arrived at Lunga Point on 11 November, McCawley's group from Nouméa on 12 November. By dusk on 12 November, as reports of Japanese ship movements from Truk increased, 90% of the transports' lading had been discharged, despite torpedo bomber attacks.

The transports were pulled out and sent back to Espiritu Santo, while Admiral Callaghan and Admiral Scott's combined force gallantly engaged the enemy fleet in the initial action of what was later called the Naval Battle of Guadalcanal. The battle, lasting from 12 to 15 November, cost the Japanese two battleships, one cruiser, three destroyers, and 11 transports. The United States lost two cruisers and seven destroyers, and Admirals Callaghan and Scott were both killed.

On 24 November, McCawley departed Nouméa for overhaul at Wellington. She returned to New Caledonia 10 January 1943 with the 1st Marine Raiders and the 3rd Parachute Battalion. After discharging those units, she loaded Army troops and construction equipment and resumed supply runs to Guadalcanal. McCawley, redesignated attack transport APA-4 on 1 February 1943, continued to supply Guadalcanal until mid-June. At that time, she began preparations for the New Georgia and central Solomons campaign.

==== Attacked by enemy aircraft ====
At 0643 on 30 June, she began off-loading for the landing at Rendova Island, near New Georgia. Twice, before completion at 1350, operations were halted to prepare for air attacks which did not materialize. Then, as the withdrawing column entered Blanche Channel, torpedo planes attacked. McCawley's gunfire brought down four, but a torpedo hit in McCawley's engine room, killed 15 of her crew, and knocked out all power.

Following the attack, Admiral Turner and his staff transferred to destroyer Farenholt. Rear Admiral Wilkinson remained on McCawley to command salvage operations, while attack cargo ship Libra took the transport in tow and destroyers Ralph Talbot and McCalla stood by to assist.

At 1640, all the crew, except the salvage party, was taken off by Ralph Talbot. Soon afterward, the group was attacked by dive bombers, and McCawley was strafed, but no further damage was inflicted as the salvage party manned her guns to shoot down one of the three planes destroyed. By 1850, the draft aft had increased to 38 feet (12 m), and Admiral Wilkinson ordered McCalla alongside to take off the salvage party. Within the hour, all hands were aboard McCalla and pulling clear of the stricken transport.

==== Accidental sinking ====
At 2023, the final blow came. The doomed ship was again torpedoed and in 30 seconds she sank in 340 fathoms. The following day, six PT boats were found to have torpedoed an "enemy" transport in Blanche Channel, after having been informed no friendly forces were in the area. PTs were then placed directly under Admiral Turner and given a liaison officer to keep them informed.

=== Awards ===
McCawley received five battle stars for World War II service.
