= USS McCalla (DD-488) =

Gleaves-class destroyer

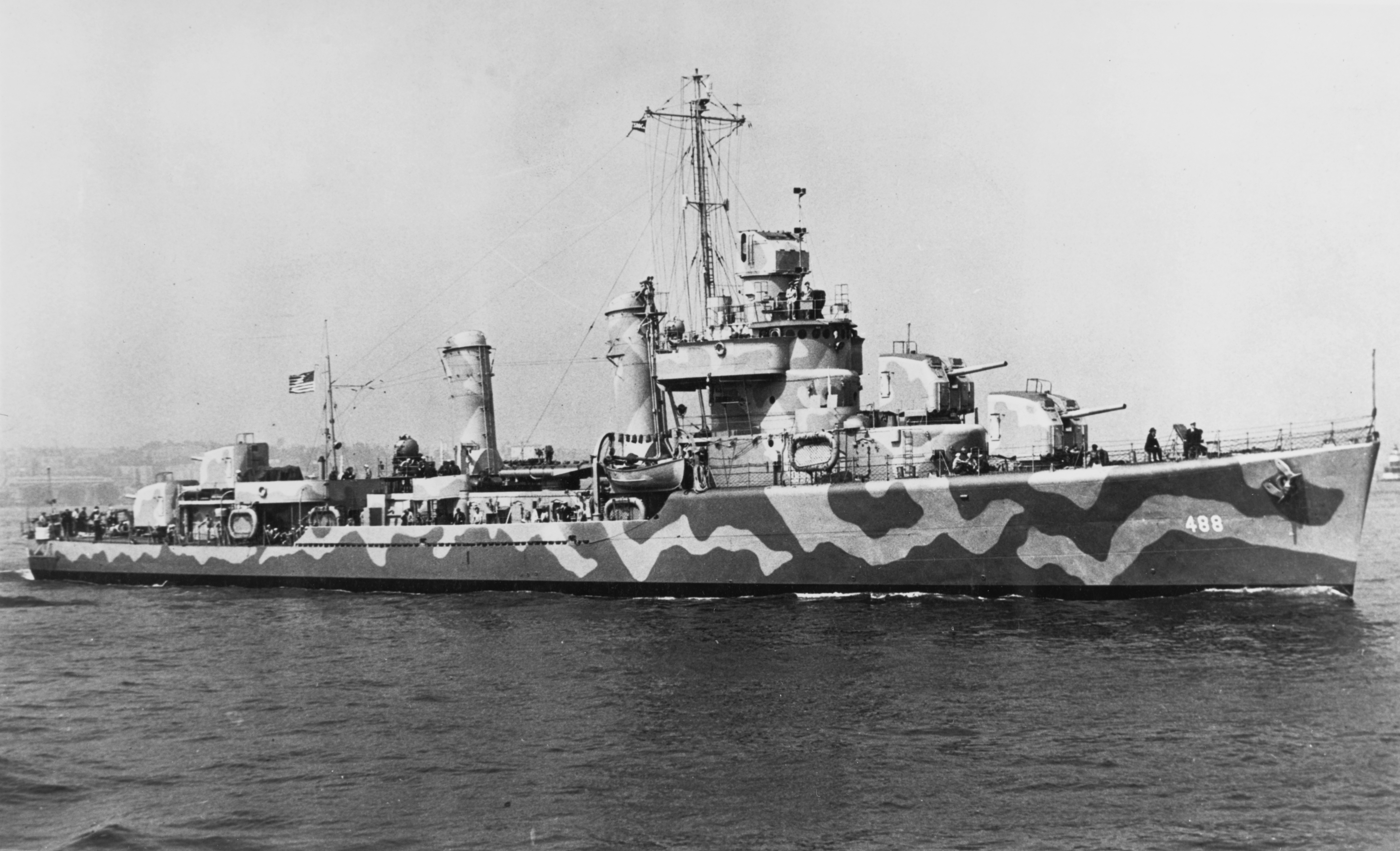
- USS McCalla (DD-488)

History

United States
- Name: McCalla
- Builder: Federal Shipbuilding and Drydock Company
- Laid down: 15 September 1941
- Launched: 20 March 1942
- Commissioned: 27 May 1942
- Decommissioned: 29 April 1949
- Fate: To Turkish Navy 29 April 1949
- Stricken: 7 June 1949

Turkey
- Name: Giresun
- Acquired: 29 April 1949
- Commissioned: 29 April 1949
- Stricken: 1973
- Fate: Scrapped, 1973

General characteristics
- Class & type: Gleaves-class destroyer
- Displacement: 1,630 tons
- Length: 348 ft 3 in (106.15 m)
- Beam: 36 ft 1 in (11.00 m)
- Draft: 11 ft 10 in (3.61 m)
- Propulsion: 50,000 shp (37,000 kW); 4 boilers; 2 propellers
- Speed: 37.4 knots (69 km/h)
- Range: 6,500 nmi (12,000 km; 7,500 mi) at 12 kn (22 km/h; 14 mph)
- Complement: 16 officers, 260 enlisted
- Armament: 5 × 5 in (127 mm) DP guns, 6 × 0.50 in (12.7 mm) guns, 6 × 20 mm AA guns, 10 × 21 in (533 mm) torpedo tubes, 2 × depth charge tracks

USS McCalla (DD-488), a Gleaves-class destroyer, was the second ship of the United States Navy to be named for Bowman H. McCalla, who served during the Spanish–American War and would eventually attain the rank of rear admiral.

== Construction and commissioning ==
McCalla was laid down 15 September 1941 by the Federal Shipbuilding & Dry Dock Co., Kearny, New Jersey and launched on 20 March 1942; sponsored by Mary MacArthur (Mrs. Arthur MacArthur), the daughter of R.Adm. McCalla The ship was commissioned on 27 May 1942.

== Service history ==
=== 1942 ===
During shakedown McCalla undertook her first war assignment, escorting a New York-bound convoy from Cape May, New Jersey, 19 July 1942. On 3 August, she formally reported at Norfolk for brief antisubmarine (ASW) employment along the mid Atlantic coast. Two weeks later she escorted oilers to Aruba and continued on to the Pacific, reporting to Commander, South Pacific Area (ComSoPac) 28 September at Nouméa.

McCalla immediately joined in the campaign for the Solomons. On 7 October she Joined Task Force 64 (TF 64), Rear Admiral Norman Scott's cruiser force, then protecting transports carrying supplies and reinforcements to marines on Guadalcanal. Ordered to search for and destroy enemy ships and landing craft, the force patrolled primarily north of the island. On the nights of 11 and 13 October, they encountered a Japanese force off Cape Esperance under Rear Admiral Aritomo Gotō convoying reinforcements to Guadalcanal. In the ensuing battle both forces accomplished their missions, but the cost to the Japanese was greater. Admiral Gotō was killed, heavy cruiser Furutaka and destroyer Fubuki were lost, and heavy cruiser Aoba was forced to return to Japan for repairs. In addition, as they attempted to rescue survivors the next day, two Japanese destroyers, Murakumo and Natsugumo, were sunk by aircraft from Henderson Field. Admiral Scott's force lost the destroyer Duncan, while damage to the cruiser Boise required navy yard repairs. McCalla rescued 195 of Duncan's crew, and captured three Japanese sailors.

As the campaign for Guadalcanal extended, McCalla's anti-shipping activities continued. On 2 November, she depth charged an area in which submarine contact had been made. On 25 November, she was cruising off Tassafaronga Point when a number of landing boats were reported maneuvering along the coast; McCalla destroyed 40 of the Japanese craft.

=== 1943 ===
During the first half of 1943 McCalla sailed among the Fiji, New Hebrides, and Solomon Islands performing plane guard, escort and antisubmarine patrol duties. Toward the end of June the New Georgia campaign began. McCalla departed Efate on 26 June to escort troop transports to Rendova Island. On 30 June, after the landings, the force was attacked by Japanese aircraft. As the first wave, torpedo planes, pressed in, the transport McCawley was torpedoed. McCalla's guns splashed one with two possibles; in the second wave, dive bombers, they splashed one and assisted with another kill. She then rescued 98 of McCawley's crew.

By 5 July, McCalla was back in the New Georgia area to screen the landing of Marine Raiders at Rice Anchorage. On 9 July, she took part in the bombardment of Munda airfield and then returned to escort and antisubmarine work.

At the end of September McCalla and the destroyer Patterson collided, with serious damage to McCalla's bow. Temporary repairs were effected at Purvis Bay, Florida Island, before she departed for shipyard repairs at Mare Island Naval Shipyard. While en route, she rescued 868 survivors of the torpedoed troop transport SS Cape San Juan.

=== 1944–1946 ===
Ready for war duty again by 8 January 1944, McCalla got underway for the South Pacific. A month later she was at Majuro to resume ASW operations and escort assignments in the Marshalls. On 24 April she returned to Pearl Harbor for aircraft carrier group exercises and upon her return to Majuro, 30 May, was attached to fast carrier TF 58. Until the end of October she operated as a unit in the fast carrier screen, participating in strikes on the Marianas, Bonins, Palaus, Philippines, Formosa, and Okinawa.

McCalla returned to escort work 24 October and for the next four months conducted convoys between ports on Ulithi, Eniwetok, Pelelieu, Manus, and Leyte. At Leyte in mid-February 1945 she commenced interisland escort duties in the Philippines, extending her range to the Netherlands East Indies in June. Early in July she received her last World War II assignment, mopping-up operations in the western Carolines.

On 22 July, she got underway for Portland, Oregon, arriving 9 August for overhaul preparatory to deactivation. By the end of January 1946 she was en route to Charleston, South Carolina. There she decommissioned 17 May and entered the Atlantic Reserve Fleet.

McCalla received 10 battle stars for World War II service.

=== TCG Giresun (D 345) ===
Recommissioned 11 December 1948, McCalla prepared for transferring to the Turkish Navy. She took several short cruises up and down the Atlantic coast with a nucleus Turkish crew aboard for training purposes. Then, in the spring of 1949 she sailed for Turkey where she decommissioned 29 April 1949, transferred to the Turkish Navy and recommissioned the same day as TCG Giresun (D 345). Giresun was stricken and scrapped in 1973.
