= Ernest G. Small =

United States admiral

Ernest Gregor Small
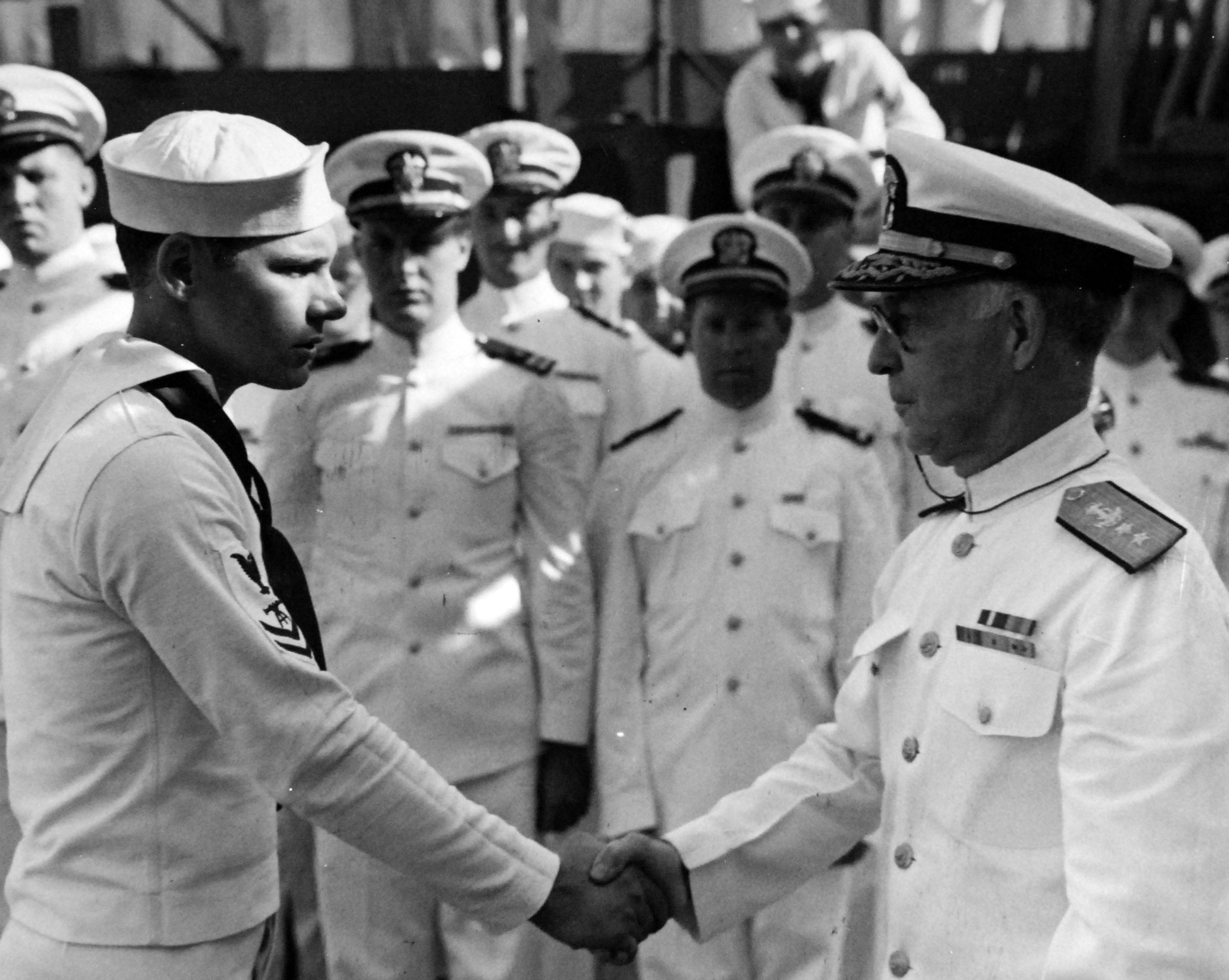
- Rear Admiral Ernest G. Small (right) presents Purple Heart medals to enlisted men wounded in the Pearl Harbor attack (October 21, 1943)
- Born: November 5, 1888; Waltham, Massachusetts, U.S.
- Died: December 27, 1944 (aged 56); Brooklyn, New York, U.S.
- Military career
- Allegiance: United States of America
- Branch: United States Navy
- Service years: 1912–1944
- Rank: Rear Admiral
- Commands: USS Salt Lake City (CA-25)
- Conflicts: World War II; Battle of Cape Esperance
- Awards: Navy Cross

Ernest Gregor Small (5 November 1888 – 27 December 1944) was an admiral in the United States Navy during World War II.

== Biography ==
Small was born in Waltham, Massachusetts, on November 5, 1888. He graduated from the United States Naval Academy and received his commission as ensign on June 7, 1912. From 1940–42 he headed the Ordnance and Gunnery Department at the Naval Academy.

On April 10, 1942 he assumed command of Salt Lake City (CA-25) and was subsequently awarded the Navy Cross for extraordinary heroism for his conning of the cruiser against Japanese surface units off Savo Island, October 11–12, 1942 in the Battle of Cape Esperance. From January to August 1943 he served eminently as war plans officer on the staff of the Commander-in-Chief, Pacific Fleet. He spent the next year in distinguished performance as Commander Cruiser Division 5. Rear Admiral Small died in Brooklyn, New York on December 27, 1944.

== Namesake ==
In 1945, the destroyer USS Ernest G. Small (DD-838) was named in his honor.
