= Japanese destroyer Fubuki (1927) =

Fubuki-class destroyer

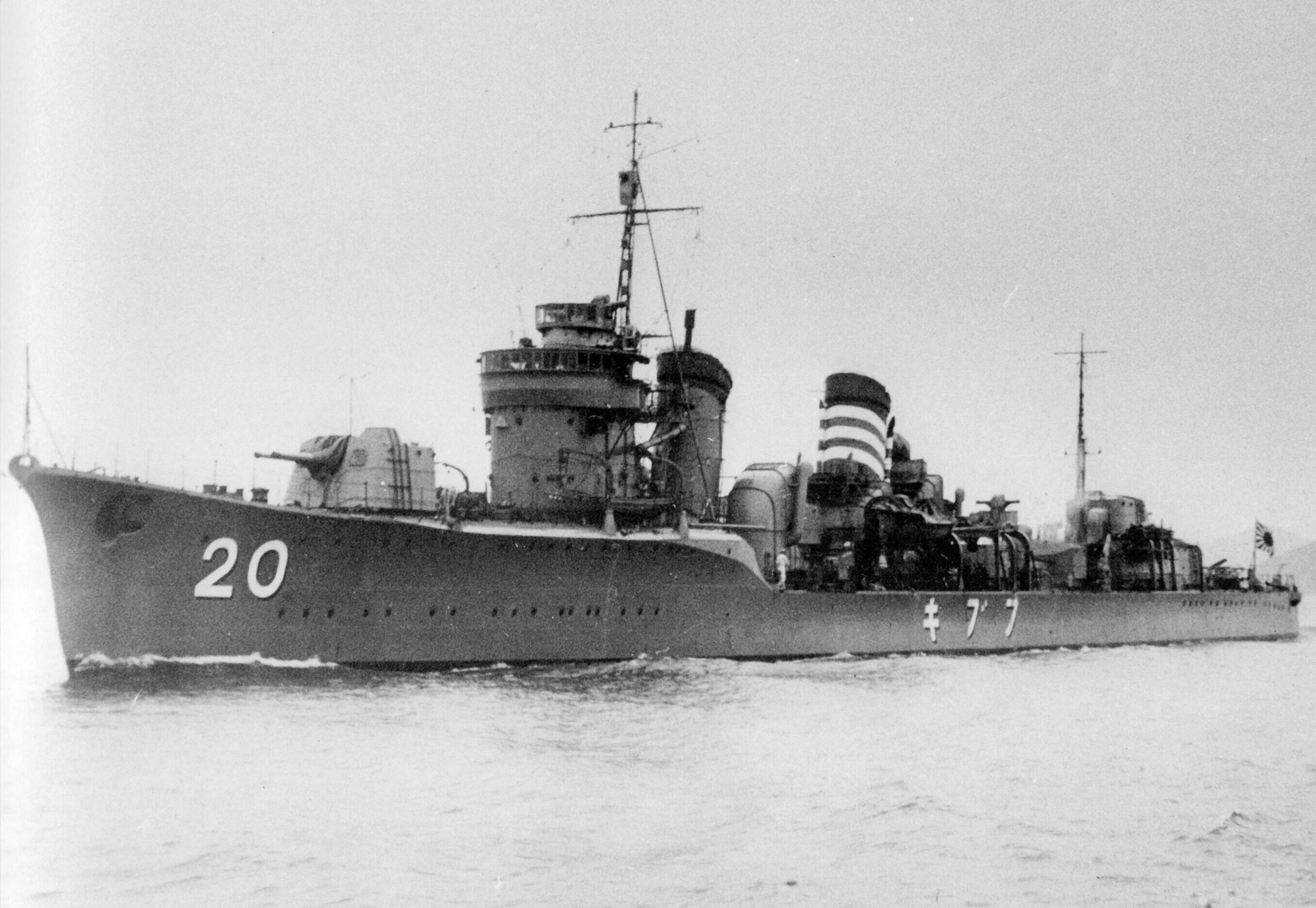
- Fubuki (1936)

History

Empire of Japan
- Name: Fubuki
- Namesake: 吹雪 ("Blizzard")
- Builder: Maizuru Naval Arsenal
- Yard number: Destroyer No. 35
- Laid down: 19 June 1926
- Launched: 15 November 1927
- Commissioned: 10 August 1928
- Stricken: 15 November 1942
- Fate: Sunk in the Battle of Cape Esperance on 11 October 1942

General characteristics
- Class & type: Fubuki-class destroyer
- Displacement: 1,750 long tons (1,780 t) standard; 2,050 long tons (2,080 t) re-built
- Length: 111.96 m (367.3 ft) pp; 115.3 m (378 ft) waterline; 118.41 m (388.5 ft) overall
- Beam: 10.4 m (34 ft 1 in)
- Draft: 3.2 m (10 ft 6 in)
- Propulsion: 4 × Kampon type boilers; 2 × Kampon Type Ro geared turbines; 2 × shafts at 50,000 ihp (37,000 kW)
- Speed: 38 knots (44 mph; 70 km/h)
- Range: 5,000 nmi (9,300 km) at 14 knots (26 km/h)
- Complement: 219
- Armament: 6 × Type 3 127 mm 50 caliber naval guns (3×2); up to 22 × Type 96 25 mm AT/AA Guns; up to 10 × 13 mm AA guns; 9 × 610 mm (24 in) torpedo tubes; 36 × depth charges

Service record
- Operations: Battle of Malaya; Battle of Sunda Strait; Indian Ocean raid; Battle of Midway; Solomon Islands campaign; Guadalcanal campaign; Battle of Cape Esperance

Fubuki (吹雪, "Blizzard") was the lead ship of twenty-four Fubuki-class destroyers, built for the Imperial Japanese Navy following World War I. When introduced into service, these ships were the most powerful destroyers in the world. They served as first-line destroyers through the 1930s, and remained formidable weapons systems well into the Pacific War. Fubuki was a veteran of many of the major battles of the first year of the war, and was sunk in Ironbottom Sound during the Battle of Cape Esperance in World War II.

== History ==
Construction of the advanced Fubuki-class destroyers was authorized as part of the Imperial Japanese Navy's expansion program from fiscal year 1923, intended to give Japan a qualitative edge with the world's most modern ships. The Fubuki class had performance that was a quantum leap over previous destroyer designs, so much so that they were designated Special Type destroyers (特型駆逐艦, Tokugata Kuchikukan). The large size, powerful engines, high speed, large radius of action and unprecedented armament gave these destroyers the firepower similar to many light cruisers in other navies. Fubuki, built at the Maizuru Naval Arsenal was laid down on 19 June 1926, launched on 15 November 1927 and commissioned on 10 August 1928. Originally assigned hull designation "Destroyer No. 35", she was completed as Fubuki.

=== World War II service ===
At the time of the attack on Pearl Harbor, Fubuki was assigned to Destroyer Division 11 of Destroyer Squadron 3 of the IJN 1st Fleet, and had deployed from Kure Naval District to Hainan Island. From 4 December 1941 Fubuki along with Sagiri, the heavy cruisers Suzuya and Kumano formed the Support Force of Rear-Admiral Takeo Kurita for the Japanese invasion convoy from Camranh Bay, French Indochina to Miri (British Borneo) then to Kuching. Sagiri was sunk by Dutch submarine HNLMS K XVI near Kuching on 24 December 1941.

Fubuki was next involved in supporting the Malaya operations. On 10 January 1942, Fubuki assisted the destroyers Asakaze and Hatakaze in rescuing survivors of the torpedoed transport Akita Maru, which had been sunk by the Dutch submarine HNLMS O 19. On 27 January, Fubuki and her convoy were attacked by the destroyers HMS Thanet and HMAS Vampire about 80 nautical miles (150 km; 92 mi) north of Singapore in the Battle off Endau, and her torpedoes are credited with helping sink Thanet.

On 13–18 February 1942, Fubuki was assigned to "Operation L", the invasion of Bangka and Palembang, on Sumatra in the Netherlands East Indies, and took part in attacks on Allied shipping fleeing from Singapore. Fubuki assisted in the sinking or capture of at least seven vessels during this operation. On 27 February 1942, Fubuki was assigned to "Operation J", covering forces landing on the western portion of Java. On 1 March, the Australian cruiser HMAS Perth and American cruiser USS Houston sailed at top speed to Sunda Strait and encountered Fubuki at about 22.30, which was guarding the Eastern approaches, she fired nine torpedoes at about 3,000 yards (2,700 m) and retreated. During the Battle of Sunda Strait Perth and Houston were both sunk. Fubuki has often been accused of launching the torpedo spread that accidentally sank four Japanese transports and a minesweeper during this battle, but recent research indicates the cruiser Mogami the more likely agent.

On 12 March 1942, Fubuki was part of the escort Admiral Jizaburo Ozawa's cover force for "Operation T" (the invasion of northern Sumatra). On 23 March, she escorted Admiral Ozawa's cover force for the "Operation D", the invasion of the Andaman Islands; then she served patrol and escort duties out of Port Blair (Andaman Islands) during the Japanese raids into the Indian Ocean. On 13–22 April she returned from Singapore via Camranh Bay to Kure Naval Arsenal, then docked for maintenance.

On 4–5 June 1942, Fubuki participated in the Battle of Midway as part of the escort for Admiral Isoroku Yamamoto's Main Body. Fubuki provided antiaircraft protection during the American air attacks, which sank Mikuma and badly damaged Mogami.

On 30 June–2 July 1942, Fubuki escorted a troop convoy from Kure to Amami-Ōshima, then conducted antisubmarine patrols there. On 17–31 July, Fubuki sailed from Amami-Ōshima via Mako, Singapore and Sabang to Mergui (Burma) for Indian Ocean raiding operations, which were aborted due to the American invasion of Guadalcanal. On 8–17 August, Fubuki went from Mergui via Makassar to Davao. On 19–23 August, she escorted a troop transport convoy from Davao to Truk, and was then sent into the Solomon Islands theater of operations. On 27–31 August, she escorted the transport Sado Maru from Rabaul to the Shortland Islands, followed by a pair of "Tokyo Express" troop transport run to Guadalcanal. On 2 September, Fubuki was part of the force which bombarded Henderson Field at Guadalcanal, as cover for the Tsugaru troop transport run. There was another troop transport run on 5 September and another attack mission on 8 September. On 12–13 September, Fubuki provided gunfire support against US Marine positions on Guadalcanal in support of the Kawaguchi offensive. This was followed by five more troop transport runs to Guadalcanal on 13 September, 16 September, 1 October, 4 October and 7 October.

On 11 October 1942, in the Battle of Cape Esperance, Fubuki's luck finally ran out. She was sunk by gunfire of a US cruiser/destroyer group, off Cape Esperance at position 09°06′S 159°38′E. There were 109 survivors from her crew who were later rescued by the American destroyer USS McCalla and the destroyer/minesweepers USS Hovey and USS Trever. However, Fubuki’s captain, Lieutenant Commander Shizuo Yamashita was killed in action.

Fubuki was struck from the navy list on 15 November 1942.

== Wreck ==
The wreck of Fubuki was located in January 2015 by RV Petrel during its survey of Ironbottom Sound. She sits upright in 1,301 meters (4,268 feet) of water.
