= USS Seymour D. Owens =

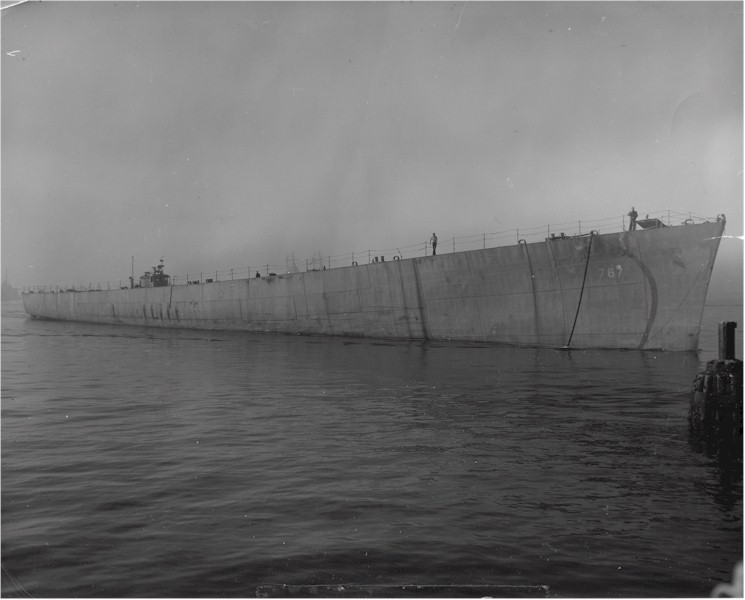
- Seymour D. Owens at the Long Beach Naval Shipyard, 13 December 1951

History

United States
- Name: Seymour D. Owens
- Namesake: Seymour D. Owens
- Laid down: 3 April 1944
- Stricken: 9 June 1958
- Fate: Sold for scrap

General characteristics
- Class & type: Gearing-class destroyer
- Displacement: 2,425 tons
- Length: 390 ft 6 in (119.0 m) (overall)
- Beam: 41 ft 1 in (12.52 m)
- Draft: 18 ft 6 in (5.64 m)
- Propulsion: 2 × geared turbines; 2 × propellers
- Speed: 35 kn (65 km/h; 40 mph)
- Range: 4,500 nmi (8,300 km; 5,200 mi) at 20 kn (37 km/h; 23 mph)
- Complement: 336 officers and enlisted
- Armament: 6 × 5 in (127 mm)/38 caliber guns; 12 × 40 mm (1.6 in) Bofors AA guns; 11 × 20 mm (0.79 in) Oerlikon AA cannons; 10 × 21 in (533 mm) torpedo tubes; 6 × depth charge projectors; 2 × depth charge tracks

USS Seymour D. Owens (DD-767) was scheduled to be a Gearing-class destroyer in the United States Navy. She was named for Seymour D. Owens, a United States Navy officer killed during World War II.

Seymour D. Owens was laid down on 3 April 1944 by the Bethlehem Steel Company, San Francisco, California, and was assigned the name Seymour D. Owens on 8 January 1945. Seymour Owens was the captain of the destroyer USS Norman Scott (DD-690); he was killed in action during World War II off the coast of Tinian aboard Norman Scott on 24 July 1944.

Since Seymour D. Owens was incomplete at the end of World War II, further construction was cancelled on 7 January 1946, and the incomplete ship was delivered to the U.S. Navy on 28 February 1947. Portions of her hull were used to repair the destroyer USS Ernest G. Small (DD-838). The remainder of her hull was then berthed with the Pacific Reserve Fleet where it remained until sold for scrapping to National Metal and Steel on 23 March 1959. The name Seymour D. Owens was struck from the Naval Vessel Register on 9 June 1958.

== Bibliography ==
- Silverstone, Paul H. (2008). The Navy of World War II, 1922-1947. The U.S. Navy Warship Series. New York: Routledge. ISBN 978-0-415-97898-9.
