= USS Libra =

Cargo ship of the United States Navy

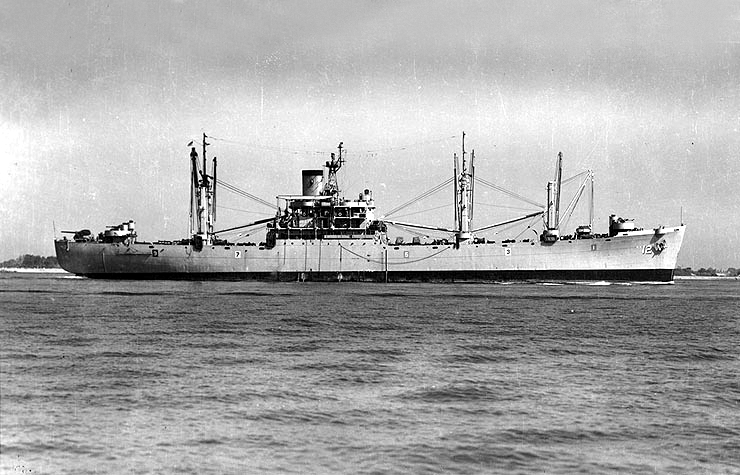
- USS Libra (AKA-12)

History

United States
- Name: USS Libra
- Namesake: The constellation Libra
- Builder: Federal Shipbuilding and Drydock Company, Kearny, New Jersey
- Laid down: as Jean Lykes
- Launched: 12 November 1941
- Acquired: 30 December 1941
- Commissioned: 13 May 1942, as USS Libra (AK-53)
- Decommissioned: 12 April 1948
- Reclassified: AKA-12 (Attack cargo ship), 1 February 1943
- Recommissioned: 28 August 1950
- Decommissioned: 6 October 1955
- Reclassified: LKA-12 (Amphibious transport), 1 January 1969
- Stricken: 1 January 1977
- Honors and awards: 9 battle stars (World War II)
- Fate: Sold for scrap, 17 April 1985

General characteristics
- Class & type: Arcturus-class attack cargo ship
- Type: Type C2 ship
- Displacement: 10,713 long tons (10,885 t) full
- Length: 459 ft 2 in (139.95 m)
- Beam: 63 ft (19 m)
- Draft: 20 ft 6 in (6.25 m)
- Speed: 15.5 knots (28.7 km/h; 17.8 mph)
- Complement: 406
- Armament: 1 × 5"/38 caliber gun mount; 4 × 3 in (76 mm) gun mounts

USS Libra (AK-53/AKA-12/LKA-12) was an Arcturus-class attack cargo ship named after the constellation Libra. She served as a commissioned ship for 11 years.

Libra (AK-53) was laid down as Jean Lykes by Federal Shipbuilding and Drydock Company, Kearny, N.J., under contract for Lykes Brothers Steamship Company, Galveston, Texas; launched 12 November 1941; sponsored by Lindy Boggs, wife of Congressman Hale Boggs of Louisiana; acquired by the Navy on 30 December 1941; named Libra on 9 January 1942; and commissioned on 13 May 1942. Libra received nine battle stars for World War II service.

== Operational history ==
=== World War II ===
==== Solomons and Bougainville campaigns ====
Completing conversion at New York City on 26 May 1942, Libra loaded combat equipment at Hampton Roads and sailed on 10 June for Wellington, New Zealand, arriving 11 July. Laden with cargo for the 1st Marine Expeditionary Force, she sailed 22 July for rehearsals in the Fijis for the first Allied offensive of the Pacific War, the Solomons campaign. Libra arrived off Tulagi on 7 August, and began an unloading interrupted six times in the next three days, as enemy air attack caused her to go to general quarters and stand off to maneuver in open waters. In the early morning 9 August she heard heavy gunfire to the northwest, where Allied warships engaged the Japanese in the Battle of Savo Island, fighting to protect the transports and their vital cargo. Later the same day, empty, she sailed for Wellington, arriving 20 August.

For the next three months, Libra sailed from Noumea to the Ellice Islands and Espiritu Santo, base for the Guadalcanal operation, building up supplies.

She returned to Guadalcanal 11 November, and her group almost immediately came under enemy air attack. The determined enemy sent another seven planes against the transports next day; all were splashed by Libra and her sisters. She sailed for Espiritu Santo on 13 November as the Battle of Guadalcanal, just south of Savo Island, raged to a victory which gave the Allies sea control off the southern Solomons. Returning to Espiritu Santo on 15 November, Libra prepared for two additional voyages to Guadalcanal during the next month, bringing cargo essential to the epic struggles of the marines to wrest the island from the Japanese.

From mid-December 1942 through March 1943, Libra, redesignated AKA-12 on 1 February, carried war equipment from New Zealand to bases in the New Hebrides. Joining the 3rd Fleet on 20 March, she returned to Guadalcanal on 3 April, and four days later joined in fighting off land-based enemy aircraft. She returned to Espiritu Santo on 10 April, and during the next 80 days made four voyages carrying cargo for the occupation of Guadalcanal. For her superlative performance of duty through the Guadalcanal campaign, Libra received the Navy Unit Commendation. She earned it in part on 30 June, when, unloading cargo at Rendova, her task group came under heavy enemy air attack. Deadly anti-aircraft fire downed 17 of the 25 attacking torpedo planes before they could launch torpedoes, but some got through to strike McCawley (APA-4) after passing under Libra, unladen and high in the water. Libra took the stricken transport in tow. Later the same day, the two were attacked by eight dive bombers, three of whom they splashed. Relieved of the tow later that afternoon, Libra returned to Guadalcanal.

Aside from a repair period in New Zealand in August, Libra gave the next four months to building up the base on Guadalcanal with cargo from New Caledonia, then was part of the assault force for Bougainville, arriving Empress Augusta Bay on 1 November. Promptly unloading, she sailed the same day for Guadalcanal for additional cargo, with which she arrived Bougainville on 8 November, immediately to splash one of 25 dive bombers attacking her transport group.

Libra carried cargo among the New Hebrides, Solomons, and Marshalls until June 1944, when she prepared for the assault on Guam. Arriving off Guam from Eniwetok on 21 July, she quickly discharged heavy equipment for the 3rd Marines on the Asan beaches, then sailed for San Francisco, arriving from Pearl Harbor on 19 August.

==== Leyte ====
Overhauled, Libra sailed from San Francisco on 20 October for Milne Bay, New Guinea, and Manus, where she readied for the Lingayen Gulf landings. She entered the Gulf on 11 January 1945, off-loaded her vital cargo, and sailed for Leyte, Ulithi, and Guam. Her final amphibious operation was the Battle of Iwo Jima, off which she arrived 19 February. For two weeks she maneuvered off the volcanic beaches, avoiding enemy shore batteries as she landed marine combat gear. For the remainder of the war, Libra carried cargo from Noumea to Leyte and intermediate ports.

=== Post World War II ===
In the first of her post-war cargo runs supporting the occupation of Japan, she entered Tokyo Bay on 2 September. Duty complete by 21 November, Libra steamed for Seattle, arriving 30 November.

Serving with the U.S. Pacific Fleet out of San Francisco for the next two years, Libra made four voyages to the western Pacific for essential cargo operations. She departed Guam on 6 October 1947 for Hawaii, the Panama Canal, and Boston, where she arrived on 26 November. Here she decommissioned on 19 April 1948 and entered the Atlantic Reserve Fleet.

=== Korean War ===
With the increased demand on cargo facilities brought on by the Korean War, Libra recommissioned 28 August 1950 to join the Amphibious Force, Atlantic Fleet, supporting its training operations along the east coast and in the Caribbean. She served in the Mediterranean with the 6th Fleet from 18 January to 12 May 1954, then trained reservists, sailing often with them to the Caribbean.

== Decommissioned ==
Libra was decommissioned on 6 October 1955, to join the Reserve Fleet at James River Va., where she remained until transferred to the Maritime Administration in July 1964. The ship was redesignated LKA-12 (Amphibious Transport) on 1 January 1969. She entered the National Defense Reserve Fleet, struck from the Naval Vessel Register on 1 January 1977, and sold for scrapping on 17 April 1985.
