= Crossing the T =

Naval tactic in gun battle

In this animation, the ship near the top is crossing the T of the ship on the bottom.

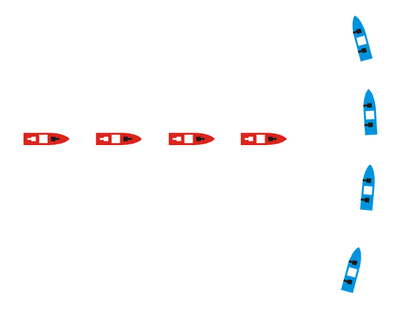
The blue ships are crossing the T of the red ships

Blue crosses Red's T, animation

Crossing the T or capping the T is a classic naval warfare tactic used from the late 19th to the mid-20th centuries in which a line of warships crosses in front of a line of enemy ships to allow the crossing line to bring all their guns to bear while it receives fire from only the forward guns of the enemy.

It became possible to bring all of a ship's main guns to bear only in the late 19th and the early 20th centuries, with the advent of steam-powered battleships with rotating gun turrets, which were able to move faster and turn more quickly than sailing ships, which had fixed guns facing sideways. Missiles and aircraft largely obsoleted this tactic as long-range strikes are less dependent on the direction the ships are facing.

== Tactics ==
When going into battle, ships would assume a battle line formation called "line astern", in which one vessel follows another in one or more parallel lines. This allows each ship to fire over wide arcs without lofting salvos of projectiles over friendly vessels. Each ship in the line generally engages its opposite number in the enemy battle line which moves in a parallel course.

However, moving ahead of the enemy line on a perpendicular course (crossing the T) enables a ship to launch salvos at the same target with both the forward and rear turrets, maximizing the chances for a hit. It also makes ranging errors less critical for the ship doing the crossing, while simultaneously more critical for the ship being crossed. In military terms, this is known as "enfilade fire". The tactic, designed for heavily armed and armoured battleships, was used with varying degrees of success with more lightly armed and armoured cruisers and heavy cruisers.

Advances in gun manufacturing and fire-control systems allowed engagements at increasingly long range, from approximately 6,000 yards (5.5 km; 2.9 nautical miles) at the Battle of Tsushima in 1905 to 20,000 yards (18 km; 9.8 nautical miles) at the Battle of Jutland in 1916. The introduction of brown powder, which burned less rapidly than black powder, allowed longer barrels, which allow greater accuracy; and because it expands less sharply than black powder, it puts less strain on the insides of the barrel, allowing guns to last longer and to be manufactured to tighter tolerances. The addition of radar allowed World War II-era ships to fire farther, more accurately, and at night.

== Battles ==
Notable battles in which warships crossed the T include:

- Battle of Tsushima (1905) – Japanese Admiral Tōgō Heihachirō, by use of Wireless communications and the proper deployment of reconnaissance, had positioned his fleet in such a way as to bring the Russian fleet to battle, "irrespective of speeds". Tōgō had preserved for himself the interior lines of movement, while forcing the longer lines of movement upon his opponent, whichever course the Russian admiral should take; and by his selected positioning had the effect of "throwing the Russian broadsides more and more out of action". "He had headed him" (crossed his T). The Russian admiral, other than retreat or surrender, had no other option other than "charging Tōgō's battle line" or "accepting a formal pitched battle". Admiral Zinovy Rozhestvensky chose the latter, resulting in his total defeat in the only decisive fleet action in naval history fought solely by modern battleships. Rozhestvensky was severely wounded during the battle and was taken prisoner. 21 Russian ships were sunk, including six battleships and one coastal battleship, and seven ships were captured, including two battleships and two coastal battleships. Six ships fled the battle and were interned in neutral ports, including three damaged cruisers.
- Battle of Elli (1912) – Rear Admiral Pavlos Kountouriotis, aboard the Greek cruiser Georgios Averof at a speed of 20 knots (37 km/h), crossed the T of the Turkish fleet on December 13, 1912. Averof concentrated her fire against the Ottoman flagship, forcing the Turks to retreat.
- Battle of Jutland (1916) – Admiral Sir John Jellicoe, leader of the British Grand Fleet, was able to cross the T twice against the German High Seas Fleet, but the German fleet was both times able to escape by reversing course in poor visibility.
- Battle of Cape Esperance (1942) – the first United States (U.S.) naval night battle victory over the Japanese when a U.S. force of cruisers and destroyers under Admiral Norman Scott crossed the T of a cruiser–destroyer force under Aritomo Gotō. Gotō's force was approaching Guadalcanal on October 11, 1942 to bombard Henderson Field in support of a Tokyo Express reinforcement mission when it was surprised and defeated by Scott's force in a confused night battle. Gotō died of his wounds shortly after the battle, and lost the cruiser Furutaka along with three destroyers. Scott's forces were in an ideal position in many respects, but squandered their advantage with a navigational error that eventually resulted in friendly fire on out-of-formation destroyers. Also the available radar data was not reaching the commanders of the flotilla and/or was not properly interpreted.
- Battle of Surigao Strait (1944) – the most recent time a battle line crossed the T, this engagement took place during the Battle of Leyte Gulf, in the Philippines during World War II. Early on October 25, 1944, Rear Admiral Jesse B. Oldendorf was guarding the southern entrance to Leyte Gulf at the northern end of Surigao Strait. He commanded a line of six battleships flanked by numerous heavy and light cruisers. A smaller Japanese force under Vice Admiral Shoji Nishimura came up the strait, aware of the formidable strength of the American force but nonetheless pressing on. Half of Nishimura's fleet was eliminated by the Americans' destroyer torpedoes including Fusō, but the Japanese admiral continued on with his remaining few ships. Oldendorf's battleships were arrayed in a line perpendicular to the direction of the approaching Japanese ships, upon which they unleashed their radar-directed firepower. The Japanese return fire was ineffectual due to the lack of radar fire control and earlier battle damage, and at best Yamashiro's guns, along with cruiser Mogami, managed to severely damage an American destroyer. Yamashiro turned around attempting to retire from the battle but sunk after further hits from destroyer torpedoes, with Nishimura and most of the crew lost. This was the last time the T was crossed in an engagement between battleships, and the last occasion on which battleships fought each other. Another Japanese flotilla, the "Second Striking Force" of three cruisers and seven destroyers commanded by Vice Admiral Kiyohide Shima, did retreat before getting into range of the American battleships and cruisers, although Shima's flagship, the heavy cruiser Nachi, collided with Mogami.

== See also ==
- Raking fire
- Enfilade and defilade
