= USS Ernest G. Small =

Gearing-class destroyer

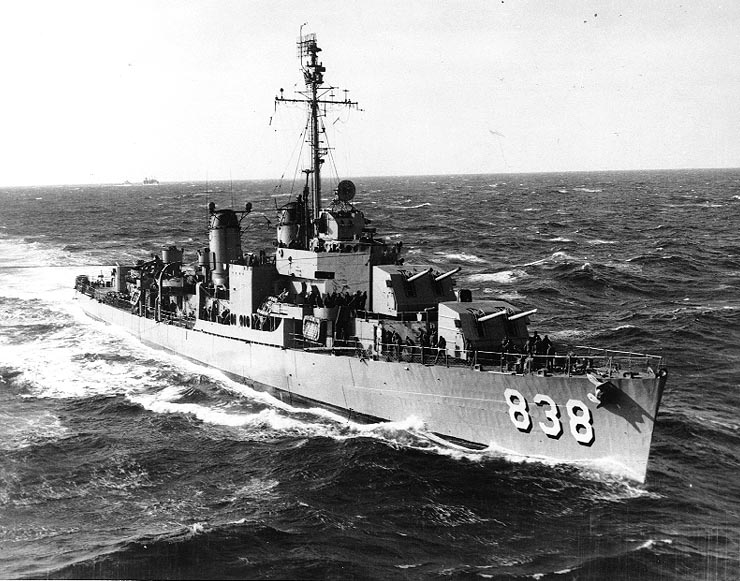
- USS Ernest G. Small underway on 17 November 1950

History

United States
- Name: Ernest G. Small
- Namesake: Ernest G. Small
- Builder: Bath Iron Works
- Laid down: 30 January 1945
- Launched: 14 June 1945
- Sponsored by: Mrs. E.G. Small
- Commissioned: 21 August 1945
- Reclassified: DDR-838, 18 July 1952; DD-838, 1 January 1969
- Identification: Callsign: NBBM; Hull number: DD-838
- Decommissioned: 15 November 1970
- Stricken: 15 November 1970
- Honors and awards: See Awards
- Fate: Transferred to Republic of China, 13 April 1971

History

Taiwan
- Name: Fu Yang; (富陽)
- Namesake: Fu Yang
- Acquired: 13 April 1971
- Commissioned: 1 July 1971
- Reclassified: DDG-907, 1980s
- Identification: Hull number: DD-907
- Decommissioned: 16 December 1999
- Fate: Sunk as target, 8 October 2003

General characteristics
- Class & type: Gearing-class destroyer
- Displacement: 3,460 long tons (3,516 t) full
- Length: 390 ft 6 in (119.02 m)
- Beam: 40 ft 10 in (12.45 m)
- Draft: 14 ft 4 in (4.37 m)
- Propulsion: Geared turbines, 2 shafts, 60,000 shp (45 MW)
- Speed: 35 knots (65 km/h; 40 mph)
- Range: 4,500 nmi (8,300 km) at 20 kn (37 km/h; 23 mph)
- Complement: 336
- Armament: 6 × 5-inch/38-caliber guns; 12 × 40 mm AA guns; 11 × 20 mm AA guns; 10 × 21 inch (533 mm) torpedo tubes; 6 × depth charge projectors; 2 × depth charge tracks

USS Ernest G. Small (DD/DDR-838) was a Gearing-class destroyer of the United States Navy, named for Rear Admiral Ernest G. Small (1888–1944).

== Construction and career ==
Ernest G. Small was launched on 14 June 1945 by Bath Iron Works, Bath, Maine; sponsored by Mrs E. G. Small; and commissioned on 21 August 1945.

=== Service in the United States Navy ===
After completing her shakedown cruise in Guantanamo Bay, she sailed in company with Power (DD-839) on 11 January 1946 en route to Gibraltar whence she proceeded to Naples. She began a series of peacetime Mediterranean patrols in company with Power and Providence (CL-82) until 7 March. She continued in this mission independently until 7 August when she returned to the States.

Following a period of yard availability she reported to Commander, Submarines Atlantic Fleet, and operated out of New London, Connecticut, until 14 December when she was laid up for repairs at Boston, Massachusetts. On 3 April 1947 while anchored off Block Island she grounded in a violent wind and rain storm, but, refloated with aid from two tugs, she returned to Boston where repairs were made.

Ernest G. Small sailed on 12 June for Norfolk, Virginia, and engaged in type exercises in the Virginia Capes Operating Area. On 6 August she stood out for the Caribbean, calling at Guantanamo and Trinidad before rendezvousing with Task Force 84 (TF 84) which proceeded to Rio de Janeiro where on 7 September the flagship Missouri (BB-63) embarked President Harry S. Truman and his family for the trip to the States. Ernest G. Small steamed on escort station during the voyage.

From 9 February to 10 April 1948 she cruised in the Caribbean and on 7 June began a midshipman cruise to the Mediterranean, calling at Lisbon, Genoa, Casablanca, and returning to Norfolk on 21 July. Her third tour in the Mediterranean was made between 30 August 1948 and 23 January 1949. For the remainder of 1949 she operated in the Caribbean and along the Atlantic coast.

==== Korean War ====
From January to May 1950 she cruised in the Mediterranean and around northern Europe. With the outbreak of war in Korea, she was sent to join the 7th Fleet, and on 29 June she transited the Panama Canal en route to action. She sailed with carrier forces, fired shore bombardments, patrolled off Taiwan, and participated in the landings at Inchon in September, and at Wonsan in October. In December she helped evacuate the Tenth Army Corps from Hŭngnam and Inchon.

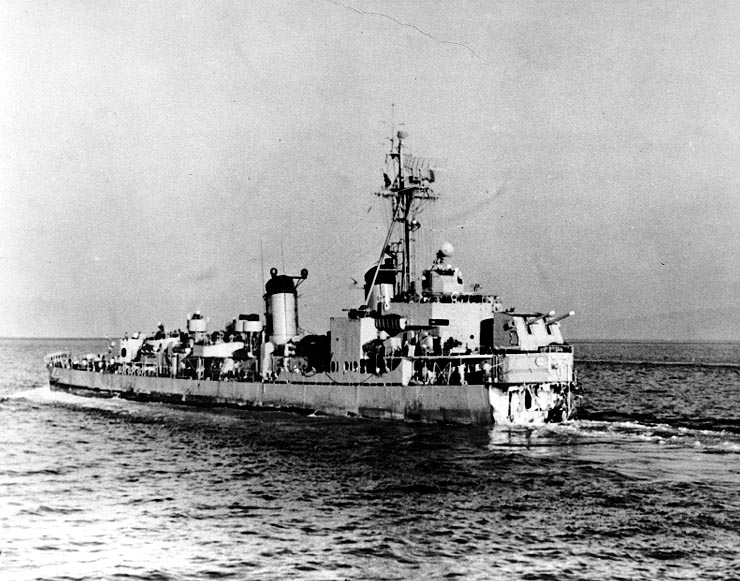
Ernest G. Small underway astern, while en route to Kure, in October 1951

Following a brief overhaul at San Diego, California, in the first half of 1951, she began her second Korean tour as escort for the aircraft carrier Rendova (CVE-114). She participated in the naval bombardment of Hungnam and was so occupied on 7 October when she struck a mine which seriously damaged her bow, killed 9 and wounded 18. Four days later heavy seas broke the bow off. As the watertight bulkhead doors could not withstand the pressure of traveling forward she travelled backward (with the help of a fleet tug) at 6 knots for 300 miles to Japan, and she was fitted with a stubby replacement which enabled her to reach Long Beach, arriving on 18 December 1951. She was decommissioned on 15 January 1952 and the bow of the unfinished Seymour D. Owens (DD-767) was grafted to her hull. She also underwent conversion to a radar picket ship at this time.

Ernest G. Small was reclassified DDR-838 on 18 July 1952, and recommissioned on 2 December 1952. She followed training exercises off the California coast with her first peacetime tour of the Far East which lasted from 11 July 1953 through 29 January 1954. Attached to Task Force 77, she was a unit of the blockade and escort force for the Taiwan area.

==== Operation Wigwam ====
A period of overhaul ensued and on 10 August 1954 she departed with Destroyer Squadron 13 (DesRon 13) for the Taiwan Patrol and later assumed defensive position to control part of the 7th Fleet air coverage during the Tachen Islands evacuation in February 1955. Early in March she returned to Long Beach whence she operated with Task Group 7.3 (TG 7.3) in "Operation Wigwam", the testing of an underwater atomic bomb off the west coast (2–20 May). She deployed with the 7th Fleet for the remainder of the year.

From 1 November 1956 through 28 April 1957 she again toured the Pacific, and included Kodiak, Singapore, and Brisbane in her itinerary. The remainder of that year was occupied with task force operations and intertype training exercises off the west coast.

Ernest G. Small began another western Pacific tour in January 1958 as a unit of Destroyer Division 132 (DesDiv 132) and was deployed in various operations, highlighted by participation in the SEATO exercise "Ocean Link."

In March 1959 she was assigned while on her annual Pacific cruise to the operational control of the United States Air Force to aid in the "Discoverer" earth satellite program. Until July 1959 she was engaged in competitive exercises and nose cone recoveries. The second half of the year was designated for a period of overhaul and local operations. Again, she deployed to the western Pacific on 17 May 1960 with Destroyer Division 131. Her duty was principally to screen and picket Ticonderoga (CVA-14) and Coral Sea (CVA-43). She arrived back at Long Beach on 16 November and on 29 December entered San Francisco Naval Shipyard for Fleet Rehabilitation and Modernization (FRAM).

Ernest G. Small was stricken from the Naval Vessel Register on 13 November 1970 and transferred to the Republic of China on 13 April 1971.

=== Service in the Republic of China Navy ===
She served in the Republic of China Navy as ROCS Fu Yang (DD-907) on 1 July 1971.

In 1980s, she underwent Wu-Chin I modernization program and reclassified DDG-907.

The ship was decommissioned by Taiwan in December 1999 and sunk as a target on 8 October 2003.

== Awards ==
Ernest G. Small received four battle stars for Korean War service.
