= Norm Scott =

Australian rules footballer

Personal information
- Full name: Norman Thomas Scott
- Born: 6 June 1921; West Wyalong, New South Wales
- Died: 17 February 1957 (aged 35); Breamlea, Victoria
- Original team: East Geelong
- Height: 182 cm (6 ft 0 in)
- Weight: 83 kg (183 lb)
- Position: Defence

Playing career^{1}
Years	Club	Games (Goals)
1946–52	Geelong	101 (4)
- ^{1} Playing statistics correct to the end of 1952.

Norman Thomas Scott (6 June 1921 – 17 February 1957) was an Australian rules footballer who played with Geelong in the Victorian Football League (VFL).

Prior to playing with Geelong, Scott served in the Australian Army during World War II.
