= USS Norman Scott =

Fletcher-class destroyer

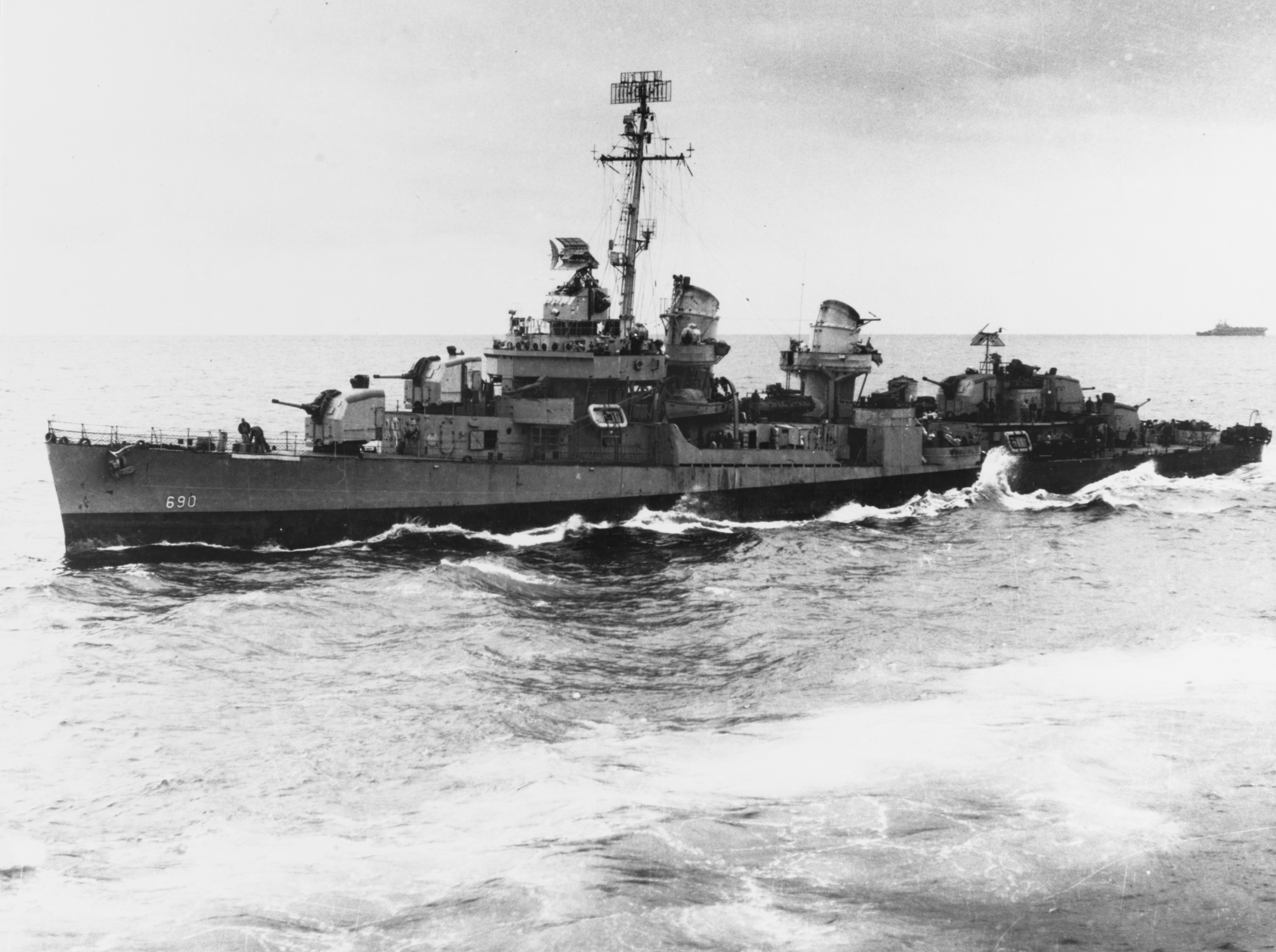
- USS Norman Scott (DD-690) in October 1945

History

United States
- Name: USS Norman Scott
- Namesake: Norman Scott
- Builder: Bath Iron Works
- Laid down: 26 April 1943
- Launched: 28 August 1943
- Commissioned: 5 November 1943
- Decommissioned: 30 April 1946
- Stricken: 15 April 1973
- Fate: Sold for scrap 3 December 1973

General characteristics
- Class & type: Fletcher-class destroyer
- Displacement: 2,050 tons
- Length: 376.4 ft (114.7 m)
- Beam: 39.6 ft (12.1 m)
- Draft: 13.8 ft (4.2 m)
- Propulsion: 60,000 shp (45,000 kW); 2 propellers
- Speed: 38 knots (70 km/h; 44 mph)
- Range: 6,500 nautical miles (12,000 km; 7,500 mi) at 15 knots (28 km/h; 17 mph)
- Complement: 329
- Armament: 5 × 5 in (130 mm)/38 guns, 10 × 40 mm AA guns, 7 × 20 mm AA guns, 10 × 21 inch (533 mm) torpedo tubes

USS Norman Scott (DD-690) was a United States Navy Fletcher-class destroyer named for Rear-Admiral Norman Scott (1889–1942), who was killed in the Naval Battle of Guadalcanal and awarded the Medal of Honor.

Norman Scott was laid down 26 April 1943 by Bath Iron Works, Bath, Maine. She was launched 28 August 1943, sponsored by Mrs. Norman Scott, widow of Admiral Scott; and commissioned 5 November 1943.

== History ==
On 14 January 1944, Norman Scott left Boston, escorting the cruiser Canberra to Pearl Harbor, arriving 1 February. Immediately, she served in the Marshall Islands Operations, accompanying the aircraft carrier USS Gambier Bay to newly won Majuro. She returned to Pearl Harbor to prepare for the Mariana Islands Operations, during which she escorted heavy bombardment ships as well as conducting fire support missions of her own, during the invasions of Saipan, 15 June, and of Tinian. While firing on Tinian 24 July, during the invasion, the battleship Colorado came under fire from shore batteries. Norman Scott maneuvered to draw fire away from Colorado, and was hit six times within a few seconds. Norman Scott's captain Seymour Owens and 22 others were killed, with an additional 57 wounded. Temporary repairs were made at Saipan. On 28 July, she sailed for Pearl Harbor and Mare Island Naval Shipyard, where permanent repairs were completed on 21 October. Norman Scott featured in the October 1944 RKO-Pathé film This is America-Navy Yard, about her repairs after being hit at Tinian.

Norman Scott was part of the famed squadron Desron 54 that opened the Battle of Surigao Strait, though she was not present for that action. Norman Scott left Mare Island on 21 October 1944 after her repair to rejoin Desron 54.

Norman Scott trained her new crew in Hawaiian waters, then sailed for Manus. She escorted transports from Manus to the Philippines until 9 February 1945. She then joined the fast carrier task forces of the Fifth and Third Fleets, ranging the western Pacific for strikes which supported the assaults on Iwo Jima and Okinawa. Later in the war, she closed the Japanese home shores as battleships bombarded them. On 15 July 1945, Norman Scott joined battleships Missouri, Wisconsin, and Iowa and destroyers Remey and McGowan in attacking the seaport city of Muroran. These were the first surface ships to bomb the Japanese homeland.

After supporting the occupation of the Japanese naval base at Yokosuka, Norman Scott returned briefly to Okinawa, then proceeded to the west coast, arriving for Navy Day (27 October) celebrations at Tacoma, Washington. After operating out of San Francisco, she was decommissioned 30 April 1946 and was berthed in reserve at San Diego, moving in 1947 to Mare Island. Norman Scott was stricken on 15 April 1973. She was sold for scrap on 3 December 1973.

Norman Scott received seven battle stars for World War II service.
