= Cape Esperance =

Northernmost point on Guadalcanal, Solomon Islands

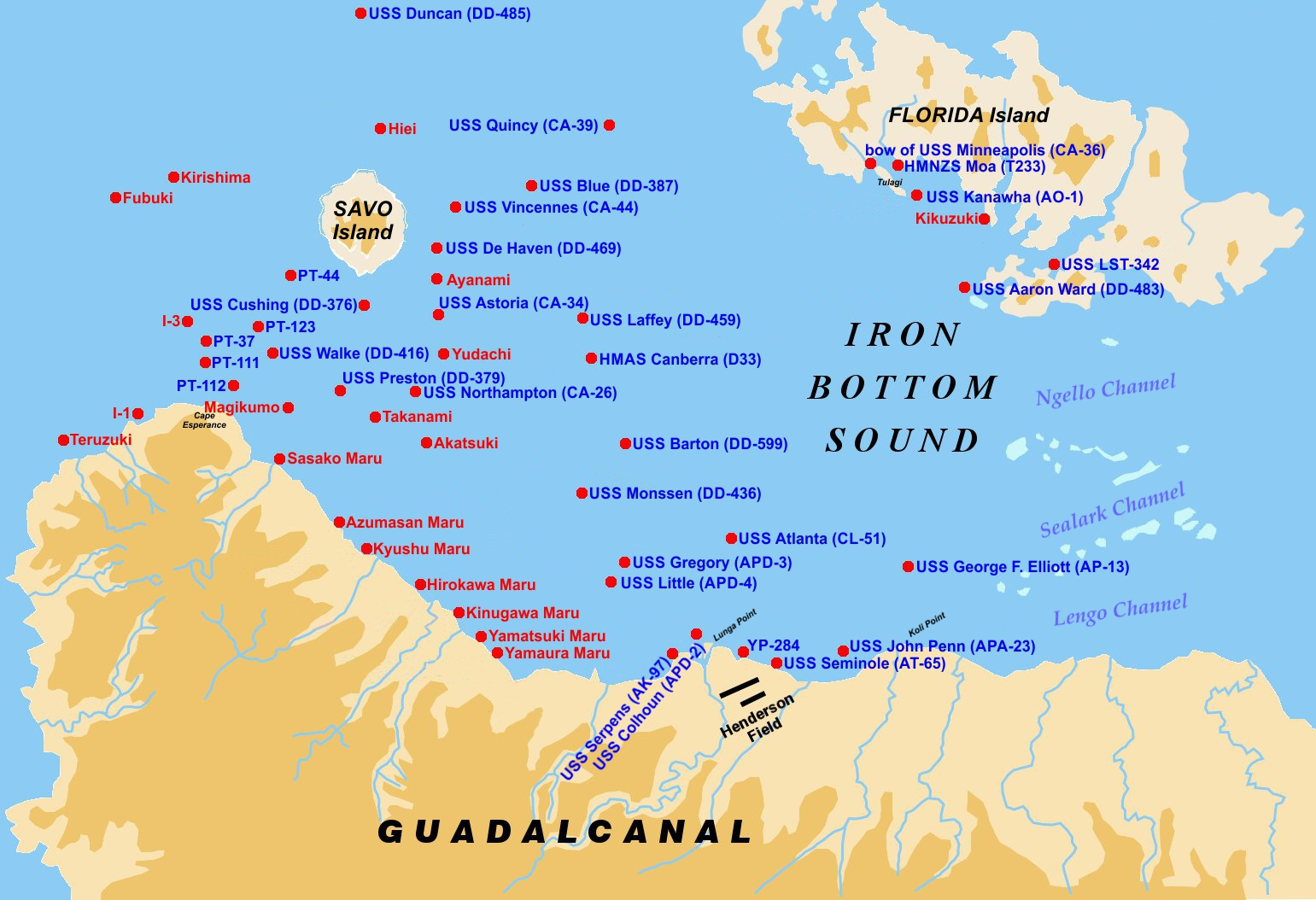
Chart of Ironbottom Sound and surrounding waters and islands.

Cape Esperance (9°15′S 159°42′E) is the northernmost point on Guadalcanal, Solomon Islands.

== History ==
The Battle of Cape Esperance, one of several naval engagements fought in the waters north of the island during the World War II Guadalcanal campaign, took its name from this point. In 1943, Cape Esperance was the site of the final Imperial Japanese Armed Forces withdrawal of troops from the island after six months of fierce resistance against occupying US Marines.
