= Norman Scott (admiral) =

United States Navy admiral

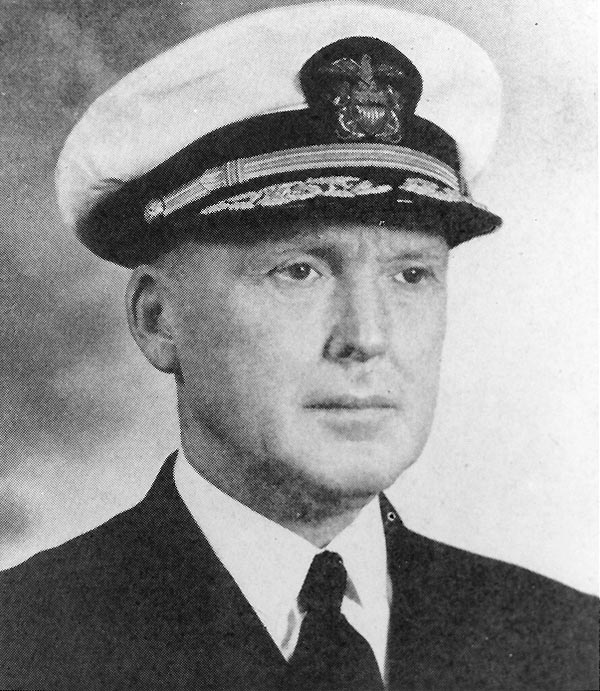
- Rear Admiral Norman Scott in 1942
- Born: August 10, 1889; Indianapolis, Indiana, U.S.
- Died: November 13, 1942 (aged 53); Guadalcanal, Solomon Islands
- Burial place: at sea in Ironbottom Sound off Guadalcanal, British Solomon Islands
- Military career
- Allegiance: United States of America
- Branch: United States Navy
- Service years: 1911 – 1942
- Rank: Rear Admiral
- Conflicts: World War I; World War II; Guadalcanal campaign; Battle of Savo Island; Battle of Cape Esperance; Naval Battle of Guadalcanal †
- Awards: Medal of Honor; Purple Heart

Norman (Nicholas) Scott (August 10, 1889 – November 13, 1942) was a rear admiral in the United States Navy. He was killed along with many of his staff when the ship he was on – the light cruiser USS Atlanta – was hit by gunfire from the heavy cruiser USS San Francisco during the nighttime fighting in the Naval Battle of Guadalcanal. He was the second of five US Navy admirals killed in battle during WWII, including: Isaac C. Kidd (1941, Attack on Pearl Harbor); Daniel J. Callaghan (later on same night, in same battle, as Scott); Henry M. Mullinnix (1943, Battle of Makin); and Theodore E. Chandler (1945, invasion of Lingayen Gulf).

Scott posthumously received the Medal of Honor for his actions in the Pacific Theater of World War II.

== Biography ==
Scott was born August 10, 1889, in Indianapolis, Indiana. Appointed to the U.S. Naval Academy in 1907, he graduated four years later and received his commission as ensign in March 1912. During 1911–13, Ensign Scott served in the battleship USS Idaho, then served in destroyers and related duty. In December 1917, he was executive officer of USS Jacob Jones when she was sunk by a German submarine and was commended for his performance at that time. During the rest of World War I, Lieutenant Scott had duty in the Navy Department and as Naval Aide to President Woodrow Wilson. In 1919, while holding the temporary rank of lieutenant commander, he was in charge of a division of Eagle Boats (PE) and commanded Eagle PE-2 and Eagle PE-3.

During the first years of the 1920s, Norman Scott served afloat in destroyers and in the battleship USS New York and ashore in Hawaii. From 1924 to 1930, he was assigned to the staff of Commander Battle Fleet and as an instructor at the Naval Academy. He commanded the destroyers USS MacLeish and USS Paul Jones in the early 1930s, then had further Navy Department duty and attended the Naval War College's Senior Course. After a tour as executive officer of the light cruiser USS Cincinnati, Commander Scott was a member of the U.S. Naval Mission to Brazil in 1937–39. Following promotion to the rank of captain, he was commanding officer of the heavy cruiser USS Pensacola until shortly after the United States entered World War II in December 1941.

Captain Scott was assigned to the Office of the Chief of Naval Operations during the first months of 1942. After becoming a rear admiral in May, he was sent to the south Pacific, where he commanded a fire support group during the invasion of Guadalcanal and Tulagi in early August. Rear Admiral Scott continued to lead surface task units for the next three months, as the campaign to hold Guadalcanal intensified. He was present during the Battle of Savo Island on the cruiser USS San Juan, albeit miles from the action. In September 1942, he was named commander of Task Force 64, a mixed cruiser and destroyer surface warfare unit. The combat-minded, pugilistic Scott thoroughly trained and drilled his combat group in gunnery, maneuvers, and night fighting. This training paid off when, on October 11–12, 1942, he led his force to victory in the Battle of Cape Esperance, the U.S. Navy's first surface victory of the campaign. He maneuvered his ships so as to successfully perform the classically desired "crossing the T" of the opposing Japanese force.

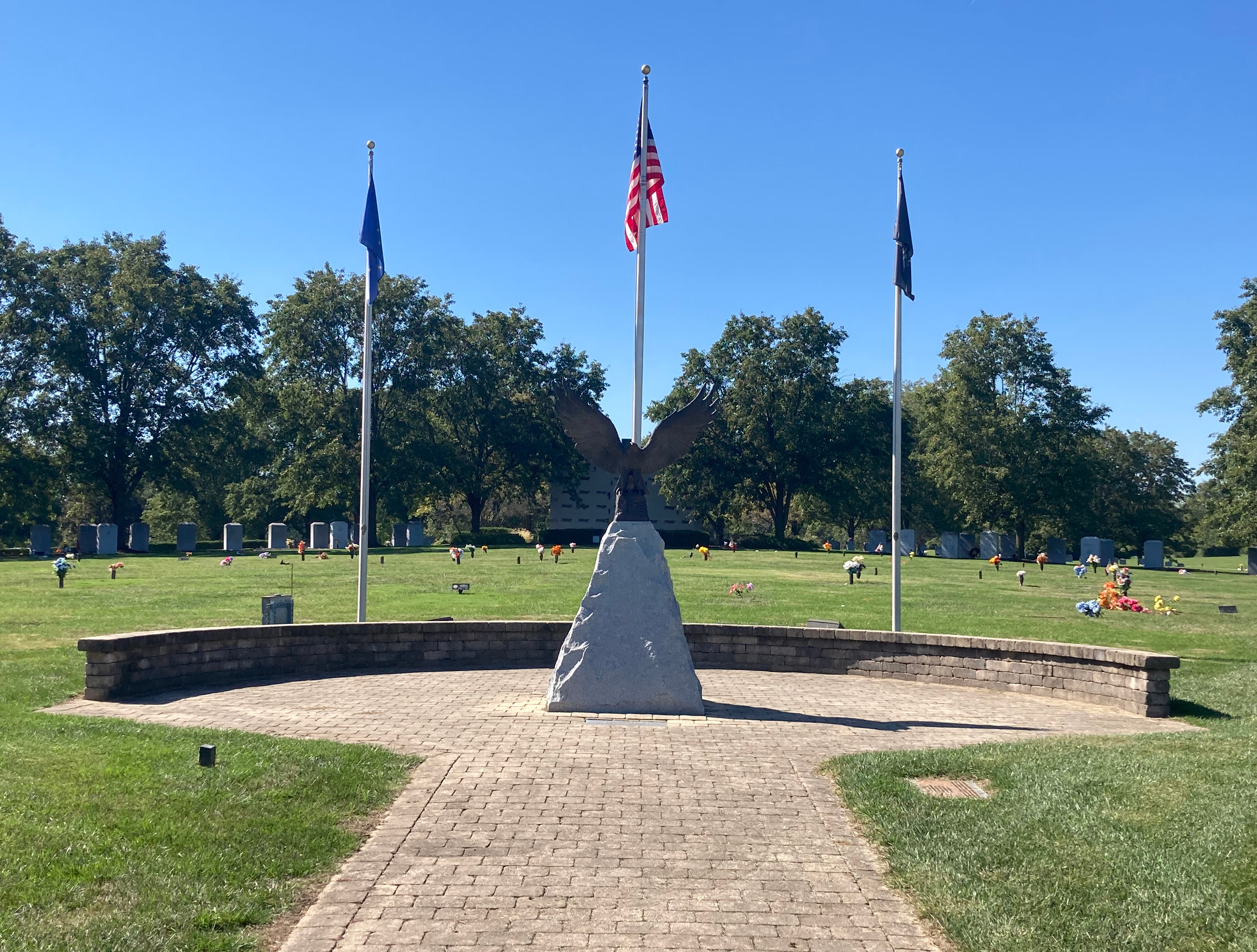
Cenotaph for Scott at Crown Hill Cemetery in Indianapolis

A month later, on November 13, he was second-in-command during the initial night action of the Naval Battle of Guadalcanal. Many felt, at the time and with hindsight, that the fighting-minded and experienced Scott would have made a more effective overall commander of the US force than inexperienced first-in-command Daniel J. Callaghan, and that Scott perhaps would not have made some of Callaghan's mistakes. During that engagement, Rear Admiral Scott was killed in action when the bridge of his flagship, the light cruiser USS Atlanta, was inadvertently struck by gunfire from Callaghan's flagship, the heavy cruiser USS San Francisco, which joined with an enemy torpedo to fatally damage the Atlanta. For his "extraordinary heroism and conspicuous intrepidity" in the October and November battles, he posthumously received the Medal of Honor.

As was his fellow Admiral Callaghan (killed later the same night), Admiral Scott was buried at sea.

== Medal of Honor citation ==
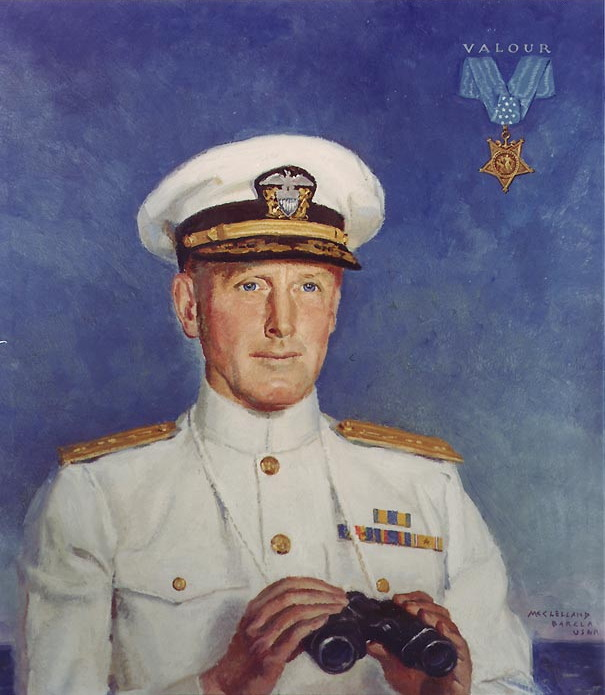
Rear Admiral Norman Scott, USN. Painting by McClelland Barclay.

For extraordinary heroism and conspicuous intrepidity above and beyond the call of duty during action against enemy Japanese forces off Savo Island on the night of 11–12 October and again on the night of 12–13 November 1942. In the earlier action, intercepting a Japanese Task Force intent upon storming our island positions and landing reinforcements at Guadalcanal, Rear Adm. Scott, with courageous skill and superb coordination of the units under his command, destroyed 8 hostile vessels and put the others to flight. Again challenged, a month later, by the return of a stubborn and persistent foe, he led his force into a desperate battle against tremendous odds, directing close-range operations against the invading enemy until he himself was killed in the furious bombardment by their superior firepower. On each of these occasions his dauntless initiative, inspiring leadership and judicious foresight in a crisis of grave responsibility contributed decisively to the rout of a powerful invasion fleet and to the consequent frustration of a formidable Japanese offensive. He gallantly gave his life in the service of his country.

== Awards and Decorations ==
His awards include:

1st row	Medal of Honor		
2nd row	Purple Heart	Navy Presidential Unit Citation	Mexican Service Medal
3rd row	World War I Victory Medal with 2 Campaign stars	Yangtze Service Medal	American Defense Service Medal with 'Fleet' Clasp
4th row	American Campaign Medal	Asiatic-Pacific Campaign Medal	World War II Victory Medal

== Namesakes ==
The U.S. Navy ships USS Norman Scott (DD-690), 1943–1973, and USS Scott (DDG-995), 1981–1998, were named in honor of Rear Admiral Scott. The Scott Center Annex, adjacent to Norfolk Naval Shipyard in Portsmouth Virginia, is named for him. The Norman Scott Natatorium at the United States Naval Academy in Annapolis, Maryland is named for him for being instrumental in introducing intercollegiate swimming to the Naval Academy as a midshipman. Norman Scott Road on Naval Base San Diego and Training Support Center Great Lakes also honors his memory.

== See also ==
- List of Medal of Honor recipients for World War II
- List of United States Naval Academy alumni (Medal of Honor)
