= USS Dewey (DD-349) =

Farragut-class destroyer

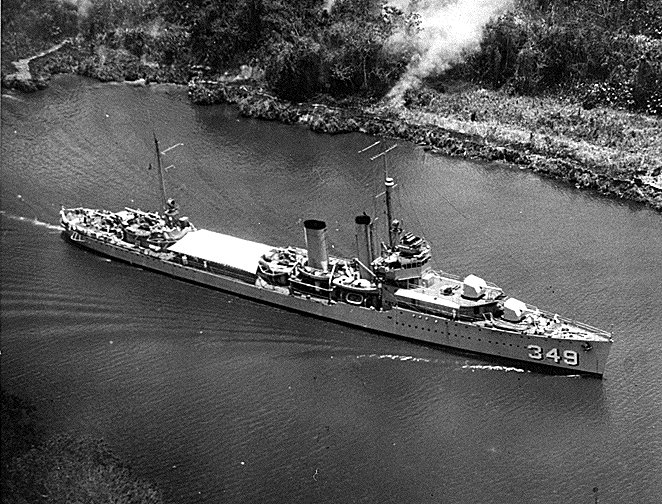
- USS Dewey, 1935

History

United States
- Namesake: George Dewey
- Builder: Bath Iron Works
- Laid down: 16 December 1932
- Launched: 28 July 1934
- Commissioned: 4 October 1934
- Decommissioned: 19 October 1945
- Stricken: 1 November 1945
- Honours and awards: 13 × battle stars
- Fate: Sold for scrap, 20 December 1946

General characteristics
- Class & type: Farragut-class destroyer
- Displacement: 1,726 tons
- Length: 341 ft 3 in (104.01 m)
- Beam: 34 ft 2 in (10.41 m)
- Draft: 10 ft 3 in (3.12 m)
- Speed: 36 kn (67 km/h)
- Complement: 160 officers and enlisted
- Armament: As Built: 5 × 5"(127mm)/38cal DP (5x1), 8 × 21 inch (533 mm) T Tubes (2x4), 4 × .50cal (12.7mm) MG AA (4x1); c1943: 1 × Mk 33 Gun Fire Control System; 4 × 5" (127mm)/38cal DP (4x1), 8 × 21" (533 mm) T Tubes (2x4), 5 × Oerlikon 20 mm AA (5x1), 2 × Mk 51 Gun Directors; 4 × Bofors 40 mm AA (2x2), 2 × Depth Charge stern racks

The first USS Dewey (DD-349) was a Farragut-class destroyer of the United States Navy, launched in 1934 and named for Admiral George Dewey. Dewey served in the Pacific through World War II. After escaping damage during the Attack on Pearl Harbor, Dewey screened the aircraft carrier USS Lexington until the carrier was lost in the Battle of the Coral Sea; then screened USS Saratoga through the Invasion of Guadalcanal and the Battle of the Eastern Solomons. Following overhaul in San Francisco, Dewey spent 1943 in Alaskan waters supporting the invasions of Attu and Kiska. Dewey spent 1944 supporting raids in the Marshalls, Carolines, and Marianas, including screening carriers during the Battle of the Philippine Sea. After being damaged by Typhoon Cobra during the Recapture of the Philippines, Dewey supported the invasion of Iwo Jima and spent the remainder of the war screening replenishment oilers.

== History ==
Dewey was launched on 28 July 1934 by Bath Iron Works, Bath, Maine, sponsored by Miss A. M. Dewey, great-grandniece of Admiral Dewey. She was commissioned on 4 October 1934, with Commander H. W. Hill in command.

After two training cruises to Guantanamo Bay, Cuba, and Port-au-Prince, Haiti, the Dewey sailed from Norfolk, Virginia, on 1 April 1935 for San Diego, California, arriving on 14 April. Until 1938 she operated principally from this port on local operations as well as engaging in fleet tactics, battle practice, and scheduled exercises. She cruised along the West Coast as far north as Alaska and as far south as Callao, Peru, and made three cruises to the Hawaiian area. From 4 January to 12 April 1939 she returned to the Atlantic for a fleet problem. Dewey arrived at Pearl Harbor 12 October 1939 and participated in tactical exercises, battle practice, fleet problems, and maneuvers until 1941.

== World War II ==
When Japan attacked Pearl Harbor on 7 December 1941, Dewey was undergoing tender overhaul. She opened fire on the enemy planes and that afternoon got underway to patrol in the Hawaiian area. On 15 December she joined TF 11 sailing to relieve the Navy and Marine garrison on Wake Island, which fell on 23 December. Dewey returned to her patrol assignment.

In February 1942 she rejoined TF 11 for a projected strike on Rabaul. The force was sighted by two enemy patrol planes and the strike was canceled after Dewey aided in downing several of the 18 Japanese bombers directed to the force by the patrol plane' reports. She continued to screen the Lexington in the strikes on Lae and Salamaua, New Guinea, on 10 March and returned to Pearl Harbor on the 26th.

TF 11 sortied from Pearl Harbor 15 April 1942 for operations in the Solomon Islands. On 5 May word came that the Japanese were advancing on Port Moresby, and Dewey's group joined the Yorktown in the battle of the Coral Sea. When the Lexington came under intensive attack, Dewey joined in with antiaircraft fire, having five of her crewmen wounded by enemy strafing. The Lexington was badly hit, and as fires raged out of control, she was abandoned, with Dewey rescuing 112 of the carrier's survivors. She screened the Yorktown into Nouméa 12 May, and then returned to Pearl Harbor 25 May in the screen for the Enterprise.

Dewey sailed three days later in Enterprise's task force. The Battle of Midway was joined 2 to 6 June, and throughout this action Dewey screened the Platte. Returning to Pearl Harbor 9 June, Dewey escorted the Saratoga as the carrier brought an air squadron to Midway between 22 and 29 June. On 7 July she cleared for the initial landings on Guadalcanal, which she bombarded 7 August. On that day of the first assault, Dewey fired on attacking dive bombers, suffering one crewman wounded. She went to the rescue of two ships, aiding the Jarvis to regain power, and towing the George F. Elliott until her damage made it necessary to abandon her. Dewey rescued 40 of the transport's survivors.

Dewey remained in the Solomons to protect supply and communication lines, and screened the Saratoga during the Battle of the Eastern Solomons on 24 August 1942. She escorted the Saratoga, damaged by submarine torpedo 31 August, to Pearl Harbor, arriving 23 September, and 6 days later sailed for overhaul at San Francisco. On 27 December 1942 she got underway for duty in Alaskan waters. When the Worden ran aground at Amchitka, Dewey attempted to tow her off the rocks, then aided in rescuing her survivors when stormy weather forced her abandonment. On 7 April 1943, Dewey sailed for San Pedro to escort an assault group to Attu for the invasion 11 May. She also took part in the landings at Kiska 15 August, before escorting a group of LSTs to San Francisco, arriving 19 September.

=== 1944 ===
Sailing from San Diego 13 January 1944, Dewey arrived off Kwajalein 31 January and served as escort during the carrier strike on Majuro of 11 February and the invasion landings on Eniwetok on 18 February. She escorted convoys between Eniwetok, Roi, and Majuro, and bombarded Mille Atoll on 17–18 March. From 22 March to 6 June, she operated in the screen of TF 58, taking part in raids on Palau, Yap, Ulithi and Woleai; the invasion of Hollandia on 21 and 22 April; and the strike on Truk of 29 April to 1 May. On 6 June, she sailed to screen carriers in fighter sweeps against Tinian and Saipan on 11 June, then bombarded of Saipan and Tinian on 13 and 14 June, when she fired on enemy barges and started a fire in an oil dump. During the Marianas landings, Dewey screened the carriers during the resulting Battle of the Philippine Sea on 19 and 20 June, and rescued several pilots and crew members who were forced to ditch.

Dewey joined the transport screen 1 July 1944 for the invasion of Guam. She furnished close fire support for reconnaissance groups, covered the work of underwater demolition teams, conducted night harassing fire, and patrolled off the island until 28 July, when she sailed for a brief overhaul at Puget Sound Navy Yard.

Dewey put to sea 30 September 1944 to join the logistics group for the 3rd Fleet on 10 October. She screened this group in its refueling operations for the Philippines invasion until the typhoon of 18 December, which heavily damaged the units of the 3rd Fleet. Dewey had lost all power by noon, and was rolling more than 75 degrees; her number one stack was torn and thrown against the boat deck. She rejoined her group 8 February 1945, after repairs had been completed at Ulithi, and arrived at Iwo Jima 17 February, where she assisted in putting out fires on Patuxent. Aiding the Marines who assaulted the island 19 February, she helped break up a Japanese counter-attack by firing star shell illumination on 23 February.

After escorting a convoy to Leyte from 4 to 6 March 1945, Dewey rejoined the logistics group for the Okinawa operation, screening the oilers as they refueled the carriers in preinvasion air strikes and the raids in the Far East, which continued until the end of the war.

== Fate ==
On 21 August, she got underway for San Diego, arriving 7 September. She continued to the east coast, arriving at Brooklyn Navy Yard 25 September. Dewey was decommissioned 19 October 1945 and sold 20 December 1946.

== Awards ==
Dewey received 13 battle stars for World War II service.
