= USS Cowpens (CVL-25) =

Independence-class light aircraft carrier of the US Navy

Coordinates: 7.250°N 151.250°E

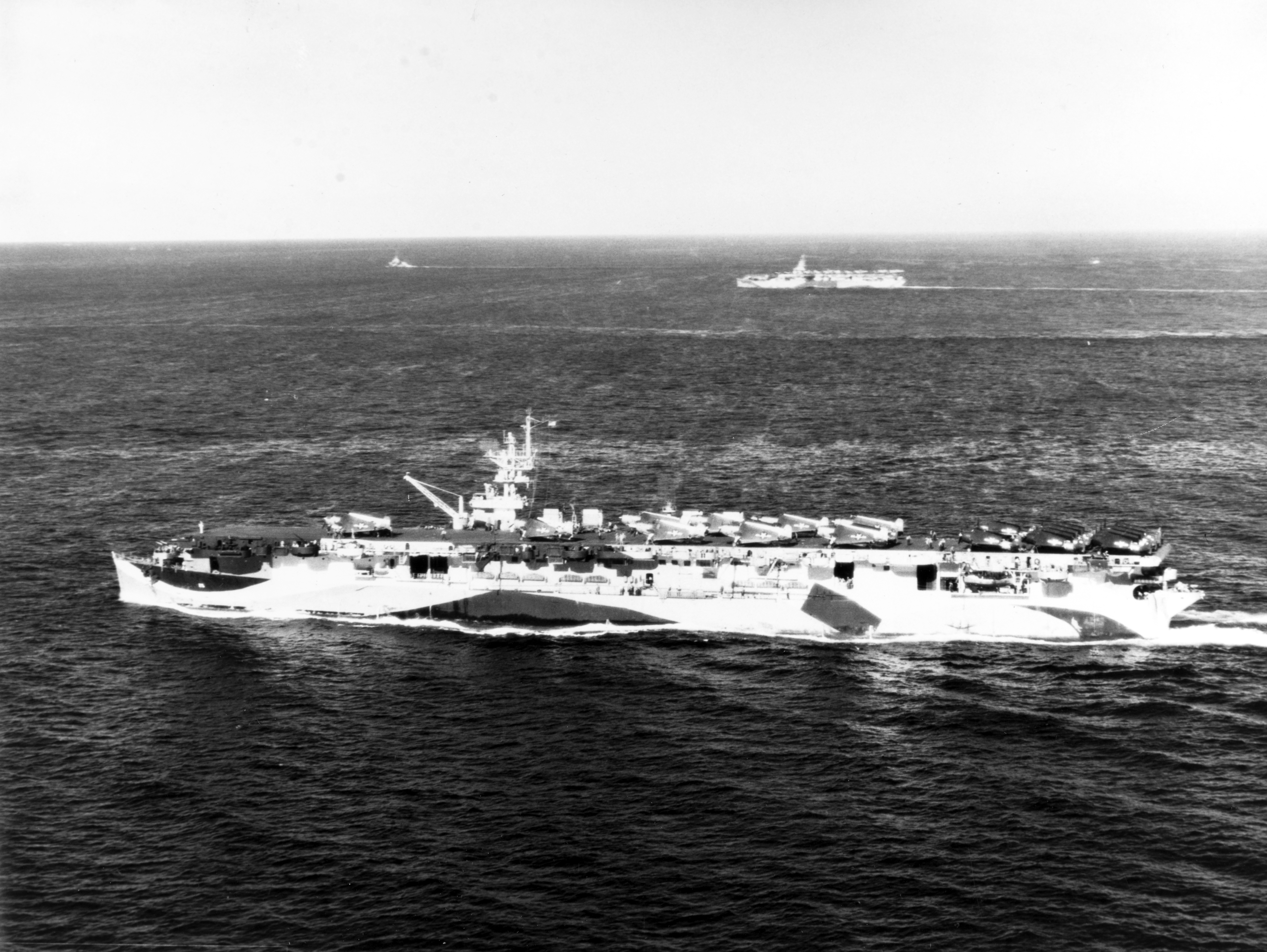
- USS Cowpens, with sister ship USS Independence in distance, August 1944

History

United States
- Name: Cowpens
- Namesake: Battle of Cowpens
- Builder: New York Shipbuilding Corporation
- Laid down: 17 November 1941; (as Cleveland-class light cruiser USS Huntington (CL-77))
- Launched: 17 January 1943
- Commissioned: 28 May 1943
- Decommissioned: 13 January 1947
- Reclassified: CVL-25, 15 July 1943; AVT-1, 15 May 1959 (while in reserve)
- Stricken: 1 November 1959
- Identification: Hull number CVL-25
- Nickname(s): The Mighty Moo
- Honors and awards: Navy Unit Commendation, 12 Battle Stars
- Fate: Sold for scrap in 1960.
- Notes: Reordered March 1942; (as aircraft carrier USS Cowpens (CV-25))

General characteristics
- Displacement: 11,000 tons
- Length: 622.5 ft (189.7 m)
- Beam: 71.5 ft (21.8 m) (waterline); 109 ft 2 in (33.27 m) (overall)
- Draft: 26 ft (7.9 m)
- Speed: 32 knots (59 km/h; 37 mph)
- Complement: 1,569 officers and men
- Armament: 26 × Bofors 40 mm guns
- Armor: 1.5 in-5 in belt, 3 in main deck, 0.38 in bridge
- Aircraft carried: Grumman F6F Hellcat, TBF Avenger

USS Cowpens (CV-25/CVL-25/AVT-1), nicknamed The Mighty Moo, was an 11,000-ton Independence-class light aircraft carrier that served the United States Navy from 1943 to 1947.

Cowpens, named for the Battle of Cowpens of the Revolutionary War, was launched on 17 January 1943 at the New York Shipbuilding Corporation, in Camden, New Jersey, sponsored by Mrs. Margaret Bradford Spruance (née Halsey, daughter of Fleet Admiral William F. Halsey Jr.) and commissioned on 28 May 1943 by Captain R. P. McConnell. She was reclassified CVL-25 on 15 July 1943. Cowpens completed her active service at the end of 1946.

== Service history ==
=== World War II ===
==== 1943 ====
Departing Philadelphia, on 29 August 1943, Cowpens arrived at Pearl Harbor on 19 September to begin the active and distinguished war career which was to earn her a Navy Unit Commendation. She sailed with Task Force 14 for the strike on Wake Island on 5–6 October, then returned to Pearl Harbor to prepare for strikes on the Marshall Islands preliminary to invasion. The ship was slightly damaged on 18 October in a collision with the destroyer USS Abbot (DD-629) while patrolling near Hawaii. Abbot was much more heavily damaged, requiring three months to repair at Pearl Harbor. Cowpens sortied from Pearl Harbor 10 November to launch air strikes on Mille and Makin atolls from 19 to 24 November, and Kwajalein and Wotje on 4 December, returning to her base on 9 December.

==== 1944 ====
Joining Task Force 58, Cowpens sailed from Pearl Harbor on 16 January 1944 for the invasion of the Marshalls. Her planes pounded Kwajalein and Eniwetok the last three days of the month to prepare for the assault landing on 31 January. Using Majuro as a base, the force struck at Truk on 16–17 February and the Mariana Islands on 21–22 February before putting into Pearl Harbor on 4 March. Returning to Majuro, Task Force 58 based here for attacks on the western Carolines; Cowpens supplied air and antisubmarine patrols during the raids on Palau, Yap, Ulithi, and Woleai from 30 March to 1 April. After operating off New Guinea during the invasion of Hollandia from 21 to 28 April, Cowpens took part in the strikes on Truk, Satawan and Ponape from 29 April to 1 May, returning to Majuro on 14 May for training.

From 6 June to 10 July 1944, Cowpens operated in the Marianas operation. Her planes struck the island of Saipan to aid the assault troops, and made supporting raids on Iwo Jima, Pagan Island, Rota, and Guam. They also took part in the Battle of the Philippine Sea on 19–20 June, accounting for a number of the huge tally of enemy planes downed. After a brief overhaul at Pearl Harbor, Cowpens rejoined the fast carrier task force at Eniwetok on 17 August. Then, on 29 August, she sailed for the pre-invasion strikes on the Palaus, whose assault was an essential preliminary for the return to the Philippines. From 13 to 17 September, she was detached from the force to cover the landings on Morotai, then rejoined it for sweep, patrol, and attack missions against Luzon from 21 to 24 September.

Cowpens, with her task group, sent air strikes to neutralize Japanese bases on Okinawa and Formosa from 10 to 14 October, and when Canberra and Houston were hit by torpedoes, Cowpens provided air cover for their safe withdrawal, rejoining her task group on 20 October. En route to Ulithi, she was recalled when the Japanese Fleet threatened the Leyte invasion, and during the Battle of Surigao Strait phase of the decisive Battle for Leyte Gulf on 25–26 October, provided combat air patrol for the ships pursuing the fleeing remnant of the Japanese fleet. Continuing her support of the Philippines advance, Cowpens' planes struck Luzon repeatedly during December. During the disastrous Typhoon Cobra on 18 December, Cowpens lost a man: ship's air officer Lieutenant Commander Robert Price, several planes, and some equipment, but skillful work by her crew prevented major damage, and she reached Ulithi safely on 21 December to repair her storm damage.

==== 1945 ====
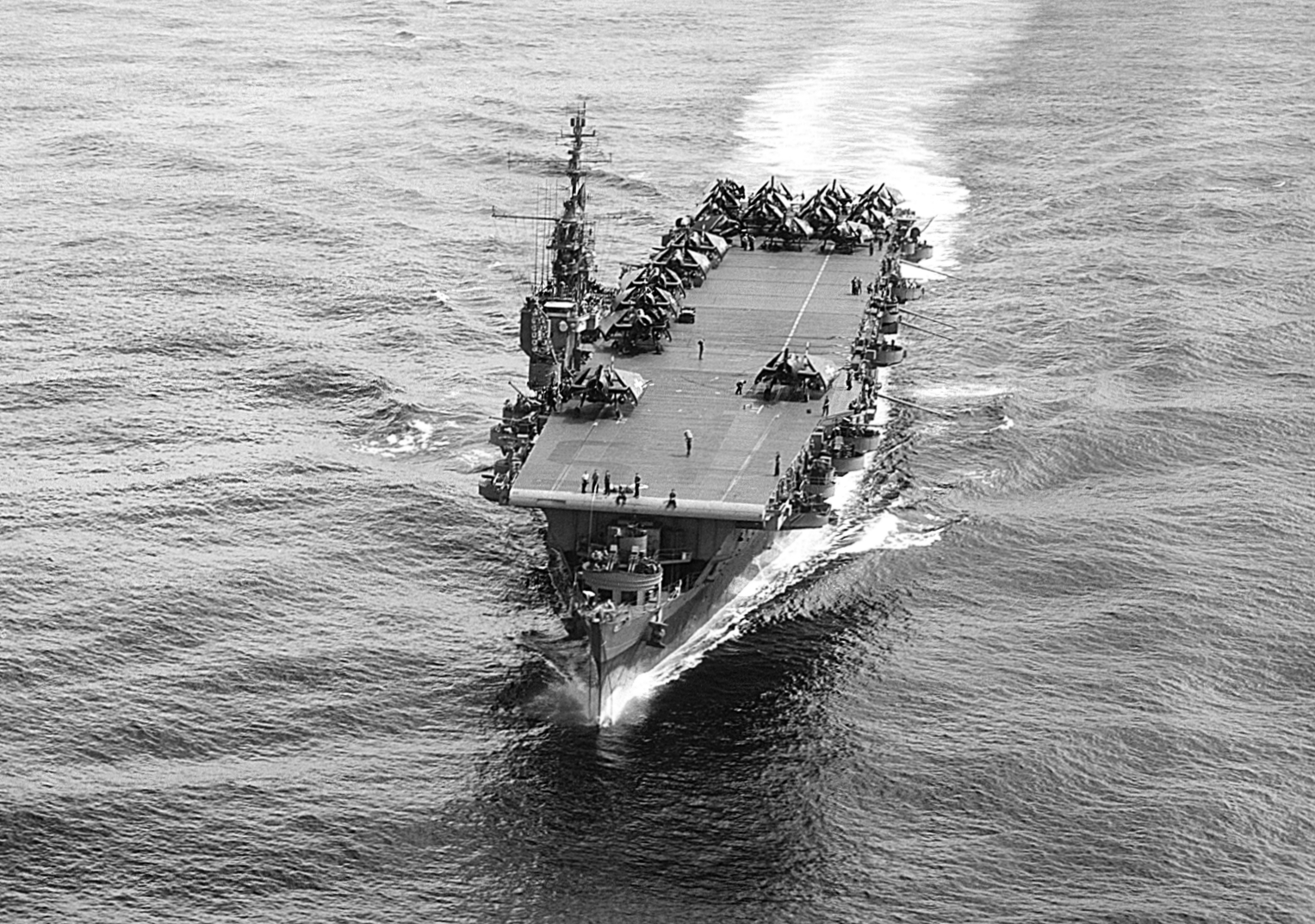
USS Cowpens in 1945

From 30 December 1944 to 26 January 1945, Cowpens was at sea for the Lingayen Gulf landings. Her planes struck targets on Formosa, Luzon, the Indochinese coast and the Hong Kong-Canton area and Okinawa during January. On 10 February, Cowpens sortied from Ulithi for the Iwo Jima operation, striking the Tokyo area, supporting the initial landings from 19 to 22 February, and hitting Okinawa on 1 March.

On 13 June, following an overhaul at San Francisco and training at Pearl Harbor, Cowpens sailed on for San Pedro Bay, Leyte. Along the way she struck Wake Island on 20 June. Rejoining Task Force 58, Cowpens sailed from San Pedro Bay on 1 July to join in the final raids on the Japanese mainland. Her planes pounded Tokyo, Kure, and other cities of Hokkaidō and Honshū until 15 August. Cowpens was the first American carrier to enter Tokyo Harbor. Remaining off Tokyo Bay until the occupation landings began on 30 August, Cowpens launched photographic reconnaissance missions to patrol airfields and shipping movements, and to locate and supply prisoner-of-war camps. Men from Cowpens were the first Americans to set foot on the Japanese mainland, and were largely responsible for the emergency activation of Yokosuka airfield for Allied use and the liberation of a POW camp near Niigata. From 8 November 1945 to 28 January 1946 Cowpens made two voyages to Pearl Harbor, Guam, and Okinawa to return veterans on "Magic Carpet" runs.

=== Post-war ===
On 3 December 1946, Cowpens was placed in commission reserve at Mare Island. On 15 May 1959, she was reclassified as an aircraft transport, with a new hull number, AVT-1. Then, on 1 November, she was stricken from the Naval Vessel Register and sold for scrap.

== Awards ==
In addition to her Navy Unit Commendation, Cowpens received 12 battle stars for World War II service.

== Commemoration ==
Each year, the town of Cowpens, South Carolina, holds a 4-day festival honoring veterans of Cowpens. "The Mighty Moo Festival" was first held in 1977, with one crewmember of CVL-25 attending. Since then, as many as 115 CVL-25 veterans have attended the festival at once. Also, since the launch and commissioning of the USS Cowpens (CG-63) in 1991, the festival has included actively serving crewmen or women of CG-63 sent by the ship's commanding officer, as well as previously serving veterans of CG 63. The festival is held from Wednesday through Saturday preceding Father's Day each June. During the 1980s, the town of Cowpens, South Carolina, actively petitioned Congress to name another ship Cowpens, which may have played a direct role in choosing this name for CG-63.

== Gallery ==
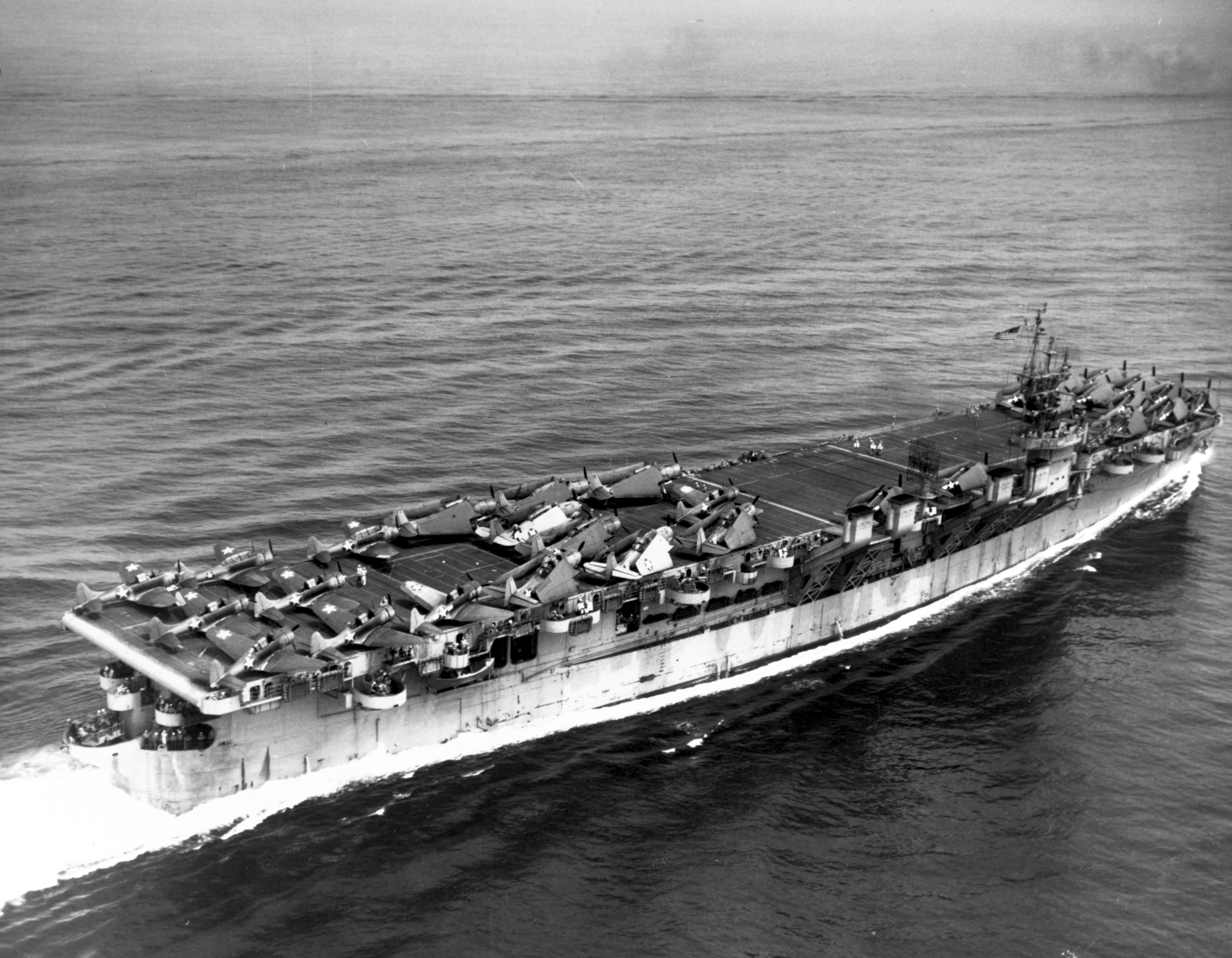
USS Cowpens

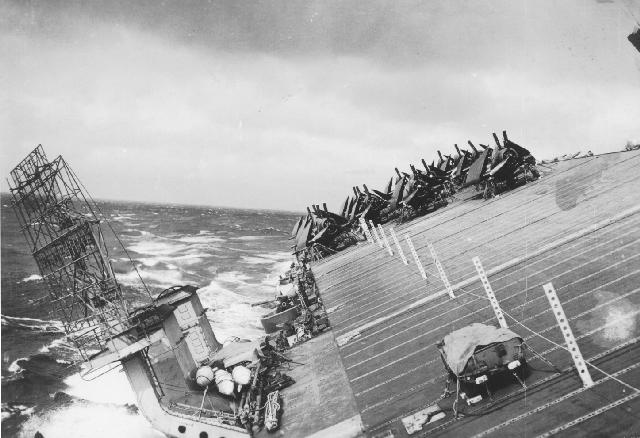
Deck of the Cowpens during Typhoon Cobra
