= Typhoon Cobra =

Pacific typhoon in 1944

Coordinates: 16.306°N 128.453°E

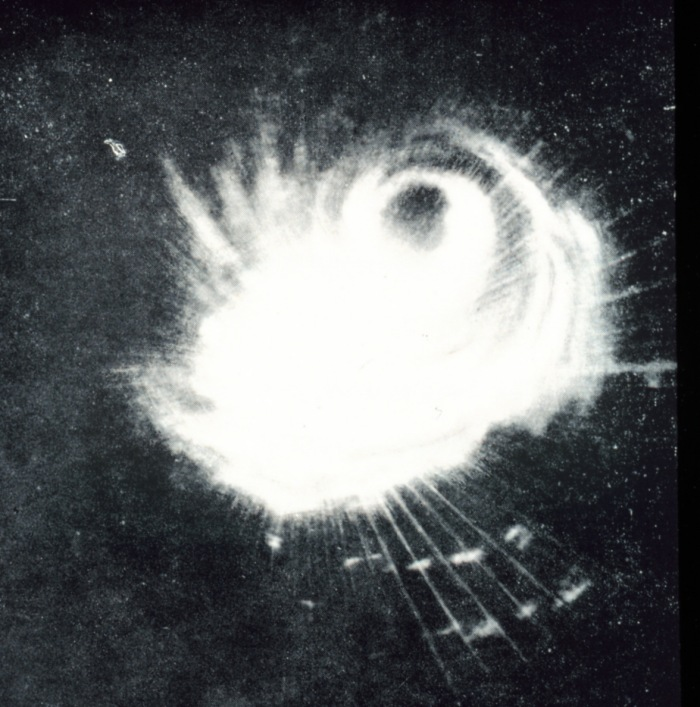
- Eye structure captured on radar

Meteorological history
- Formed: December 14, 1944
- Dissipated: December 19, 1944

Category 5-equivalent super typhoon
- 1-minute sustained (SSHWS/JTWC)
- Highest winds: 260 km/h (160 mph)
- Lowest pressure: 924 hPa (mbar); 27.29 inHg

Overall effects
- Fatalities: 790 U.S., unknown elsewhere
- Areas affected: Philippine Sea
- Part of the 1944 Pacific typhoon season

Typhoon Cobra, also known as the Typhoon of 1944 or Halsey's Typhoon (named after Admiral William Halsey Jr.), was the United States Navy designation for a powerful tropical cyclone that struck the United States Pacific Fleet in December 1944, during World War II. The storm sank three destroyers, killed 790 sailors, damaged nine other warships, and swept dozens of aircraft overboard off their aircraft carriers.

Task Force 38 (TF 38) had been operating about 300 mi (260 nmi; 480 km) east of Luzon in the Philippine Sea, conducting air raids against Japanese airfields in the Philippines and trying to refuel the ships. Information given to Halsey about the typhoon was incorrect, and despite warning signs of worsening conditions, the ships remained on station until December 17, when Halsey ordered the Third Fleet into the center of the typhoon.

With currently available data, it was the 23rd and last known Western Pacific tropical cyclone formed during the 1944 season.

== Meteorological history ==
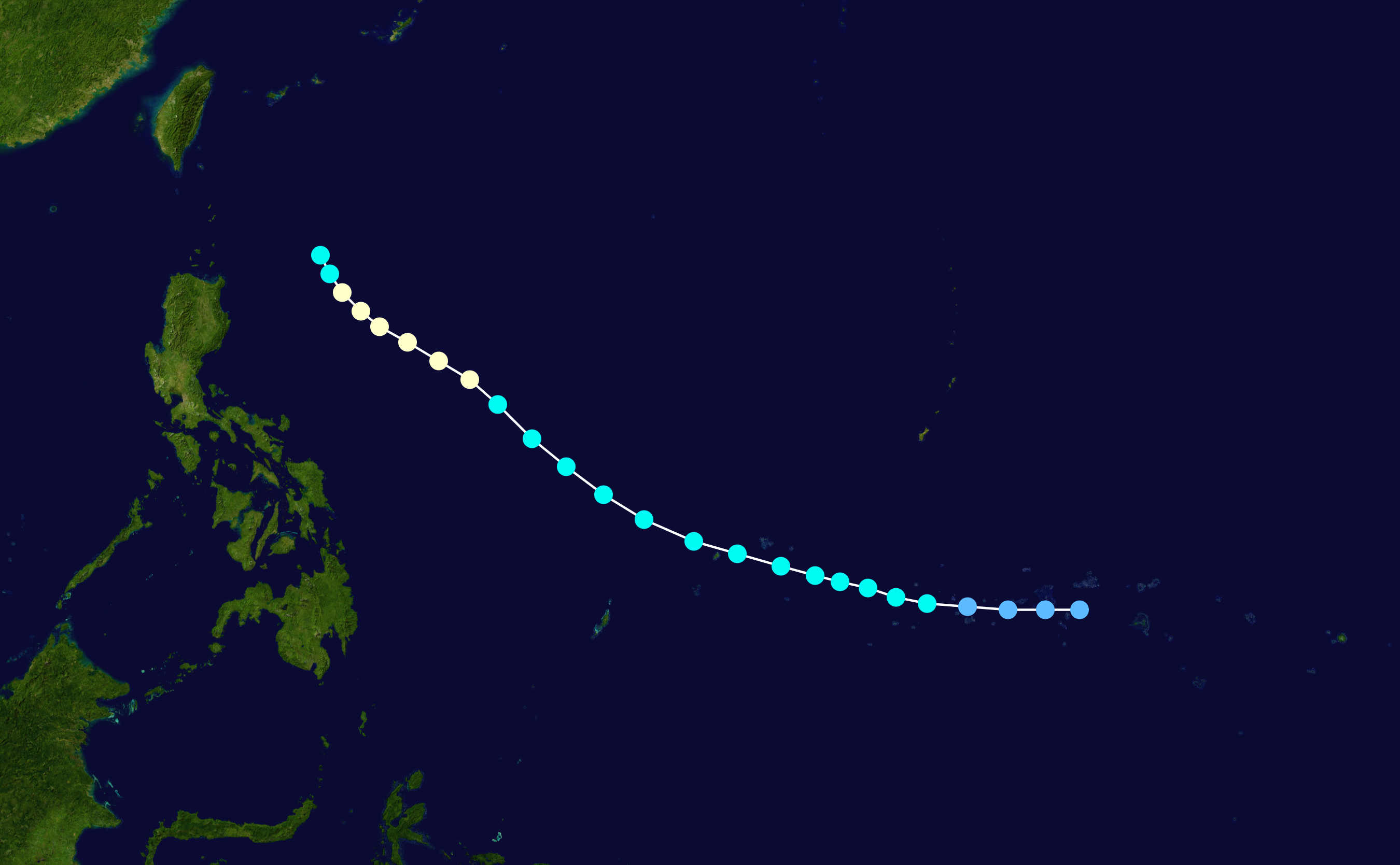
Map plotting the storm's track and intensity, according to the Saffir–Simpson scale Map key Saffir–Simpson scale Tropical depression (≤38 mph, ≤62 km/h) Tropical storm (39–73 mph, 63–118 km/h) Category 1 (74–95 mph, 119–153 km/h) Category 2 (96–110 mph, 154–177 km/h) Category 3 (111–129 mph, 178–208 km/h) Category 4 (130–156 mph, 209–251 km/h) Category 5 (≥157 mph, ≥252 km/h) Unknown Storm type Tropical cyclone Subtropical cyclone Extratropical cyclone, remnant low, tropical disturbance, or monsoon depression

On December 17, 1944, the typhoon was first observed when United States Third Fleet was refueling. The U.S. Army Air Force forecast center on Saipan sent a reconnaissance flight and found the storm heading towards the fleet, with the estimated winds of 140 kn (160 mph; 72 m/s; 260 km/h). As it was headed towards the fleet, barometric pressures as low as 27.3 inHg (924 mbar) were reported by USS Dewey. The storm dissipated on December 19.

== Damage to Task Force 38 ==
TF 38 consisted of seven fleet carriers, six light carriers, eight battleships, 15 cruisers, and about 50 destroyers. The carriers had been conducting raids against Japanese airfields in the Philippines, in support of General MacArthur's invasion of Mindoro, having been at sea for nearly four months without pause. Admiral Halsey order TF 38 to rendezvous with tankers for refueling at sea on December 17, ahead of another operation against Mindoro on December 19; the fleet's destroyers, especially, were running low on fuel. When the weather worsened, Halsey moved the rendezvous point 180 miles further south. This took the fleet further into the path of the storm, though neither Halsey nor his meteorologists knew where the worst of the weather would be.

While conducting the refueling operations, the Third Fleet remained on station rather than breaking up and seeking shelter from the storm. This led to a severe loss of men, ships, and aircraft. (Note: The planned refueling was attempted but ultimately abandoned; nevertheless Halsey did not initially allow the fleet to disperse.) Some ships rolled more than 70°. Three destroyers, Spence, Hickox, and Maddox, had nearly empty fuel stores (10–15% of capacity), so lacked the stabilizing effect of the extra weight, making them relatively unstable. Additionally, several other destroyers, including Hull and Monaghan, were of the older Farragut class and had been refitted with over 500 long tons (510 t) of extra equipment and armament, which made them topheavy.

Spence, Hull, and Monaghan either capsized or were sunk after water flooded down their smokestacks and disabled their engines. Without power, they were unable to control their heading and were at the mercy of the wind and seas. Hickox and Maddox pumped seawater into their empty fuel tanks, adding enough stability to ride out the storm with relatively minor damage.

Many other ships of TF 38 suffered various degrees of damage, especially to radar and radio equipment, which crippled communications within the fleet. Several carriers suffered fires in their hangars, and 146 aircraft were wrecked or blown overboard. Nine ships—including one light cruiser, three light carriers, and two escort carriers—suffered enough damage to be sent for repairs.

The carrier Monterey was nearly taken down in flames by its own airplanes as they crashed into bulkheads and exploded during violent rolls. One of those fighting the fires aboard Monterey was Lieutenant Gerald Ford, later President of the United States. Ford later recalled nearly going overboard when the ship tilted 20°. Greater rolling caused aircraft in the hangar deck to careen into each other, igniting a fire. Ford, serving as general quarters officer of the deck, was ordered to go below to assess the raging fire. He did so safely and reported his findings back to the ship's commanding officer, Captain Stuart Ingersoll. The ship's crew was able to contain the fire, and the ship got underway again.

Planes went adrift, collided, and burst into flames. Monterey caught fire at 0911 (18 December) and lost steerageway a few minutes later. The fire was brought under control at 0945 and the C.O., Captain Stuart H. Ingersoll, decided to let his ship lie dead in the water until temporary repairs could be effected. She lost 18 aircraft burned in the hangar deck or blown overboard and 16 seriously damaged, together with three 20 mm guns, and suffered extensive rupturing of her ventilation system. Cowpens lost seven planes overboard and caught fire from one that broke loose at 1051, but the fire was brought under control promptly; Langley rolled through 70°; San Jacinto reported a fighter plane adrift on the hangar deck, which wrecked seven other aircraft. She also suffered damage from salt water that entered through punctures in the ventilating ducts. Captain [Jasper T.] Acuff's replenishment escort carriers did pretty well. Flames broke out on the flight deck of Cape Esperance at 1228, but were overcome; Kwajalein made a maximum roll of 39° to port when hove-to with wind abeam. Her port catwalks scooped up green water, but she lost only three planes, which were jettisoned from the flight deck; an hour was needed to get them over the side. Three other escort carriers lost in all 86 aircraft, but came through without much material damage.

In the words of Admiral Chester Nimitz, the typhoon's impact "...represented a more crippling blow to the Third Fleet than it might be expected to suffer in anything less than a major action." The events surrounding Typhoon Cobra were similar to those the Japanese navy faced some nine years earlier in what they termed the "Fourth Fleet Incident".

=== Ships lost or damaged ===
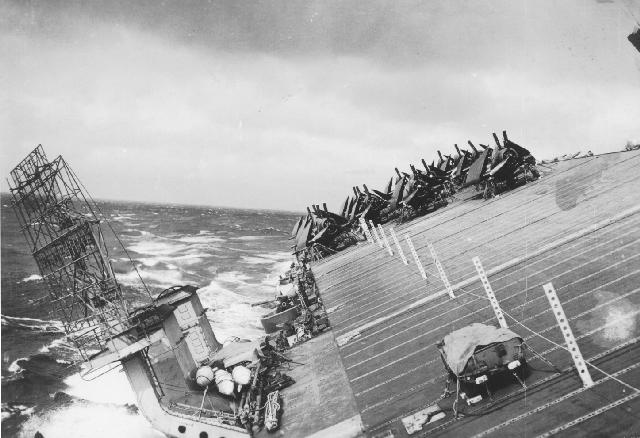
USS Cowpens during Typhoon Cobra, 18 December 1944

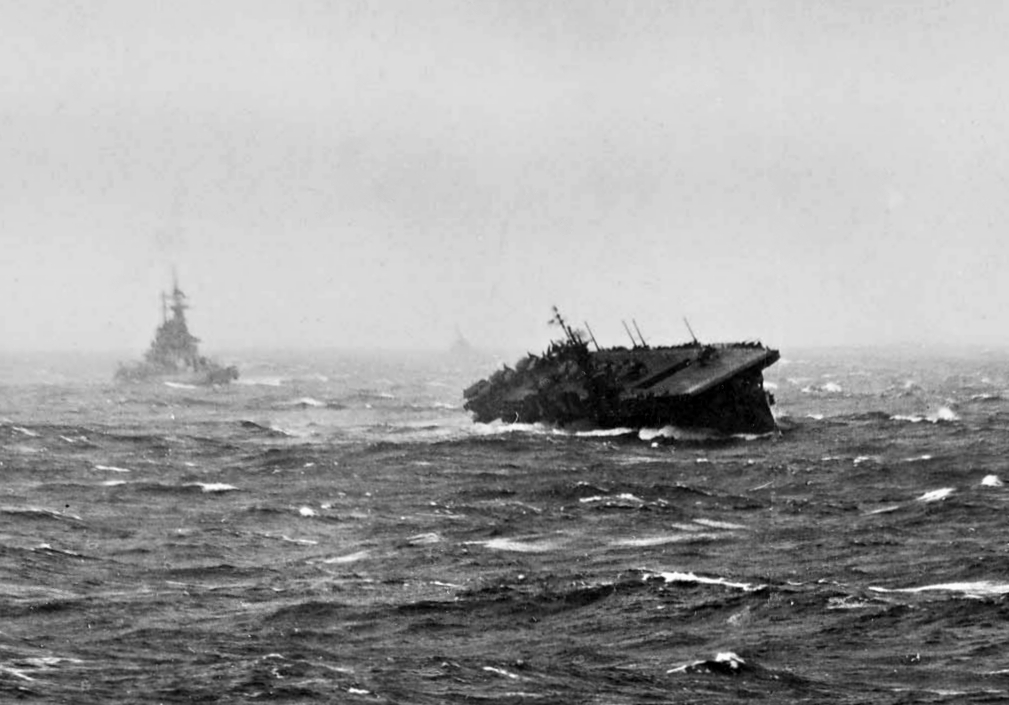
USS Langley (CVL-27) rolling heavily during Typhoon Cobra, 18 December 1944

- USS Hull capsized and sank with 202 men drowned (62 survivors) and 70% fuel aboard.
- USS Monaghan capsized and sank with 256 men drowned (six survivors).
- USS Spence: Her rudder jammed hard to starboard, and she capsized and sank with 317 men drowned (23 survivors) after hoses parted while attempting to refuel from New Jersey because they had also disobeyed orders directly from Admiral Halsey to ballast down. The fuel tanks had to be deballasted (emptied of sea water) to accept needed fuel. The ship had insufficient fuel to weather the storm. This was the common problem shared by the destroyers and destroyer escorts.
- USS Altamaha's hangar deck crane and aircraft broke loose and broke fire mains.
- USS Anzio required major repair.
- USS Aylwin required major repair. Two men drowned when they were swept overboard.
- USS Baltimore required major repair.
- USS Benham required major repair.
- USS Buchanan required major repair.
- USS Cabot was damaged.
- USS Cape Esperance's flight deck fire required major repair.
- USS Cowpens had her hangar door torn open, and radar, 20 mm gun sponson, whaleboat, jeeps, tractors, kerry crane, and eight aircraft were lost overboard. One sailor (ship's air officer Robert Price) lost.
- USS Dewey lost steering control, radar, the forward stack, and all power when salt water shorted main electrical switchboard.
- USS Donaldson required major repair.
- USS Dyson required major repair.
- USS Hickox required major repair.
- USS Iowa had a propeller shaft bent and lost a seaplane.
- USS Jicarilla was damaged.
- USS Kwajalein lost steering control.
- USS Langley was damaged.
- USS Maddox was damaged.
- USS Melvin R. Nawman required major repair.
- USS Miami required major repair.
- USS Monterey's hangar deck fire killed three men and caused evacuation of boiler rooms requiring repairs.
- USS Nantahala was damaged.
- USS Nehenta Bay was damaged.
- USS San Jacinto's hangar deck planes broke loose and destroyed air intakes, vent ducts, and sprinkling system, causing widespread flooding. Damage repaired by USS Hector
- USS Shasta was damaged—"one deck collapsed, aircraft engines damaged, depth charges broke loose, damaged".
- USS Tabberer lost her foremast.
- USS Waterman was damaged.

=== Rescue efforts ===
The fleet was scattered by the storm. One ship, destroyer escort Tabberer, encountered and rescued a survivor from the Hull in the midst of the typhoon. This was the first survivor from any of the capsized destroyers to be picked up. Shortly thereafter, many more survivors were picked up, in groups or in isolation. Tabberer's skipper, Lieutenant Commander Henry Lee Plage, directed that the ship, despite its own dire condition, begin boxed searches to look for more survivors. Tabberer rescued 55 survivors in a 51-hour search, despite repeated orders from Halsey to return all ships to port in Ulithi. She picked up 41 men from Hull and 14 from Spence before finally returning to Ulithi after being directly relieved from the search by two destroyer escorts.

After the fleet had regrouped (without Tabberer), ships and aircraft conducted search-and-rescue missions. The destroyer Brown rescued the only survivors from Monaghan, six in total. She additionally rescued 13 sailors from Hull. Eighteen other survivors from Hull and Spence were rescued over the three days following Typhoon Cobra by other ships of the third Fleet. The destroyer USS The Sullivans (DD-537) emerged from the storm undamaged and began looking for survivors before returning to Ulithi on Christmas Eve. In all, 93 men were rescued of the over 800 men presumed missing in the three ships.

Despite disobeying fleet orders, Plage was awarded the Legion of Merit by Halsey, and Tabberer's crew was awarded Navy Unit Commendation ribbons (the first ever awarded).

== Aftermath ==
A Court of Inquiry was convened on board the USS Cascade at the naval base at Ulithi, with Admiral Nimitz, CINCPAC, in attendance at the court. Captain Herbert K. Gates was the judge advocate for the court. Although the court found that Halsey had committed an "error of judgement" in sailing the Third Fleet into the heart of the typhoon, it stopped short of unambiguously recommending sanction. In January 1945, Halsey passed command of the Third Fleet to Admiral Raymond A. Spruance, a move that had been arranged before the typhoon. Halsey regained command over the fleet in May. On June 5 he sailed into a typhoon again.

This typhoon prompted the U.S. Navy to establish weather-monitoring infrastructure, which eventually became the Joint Typhoon Warning Center.

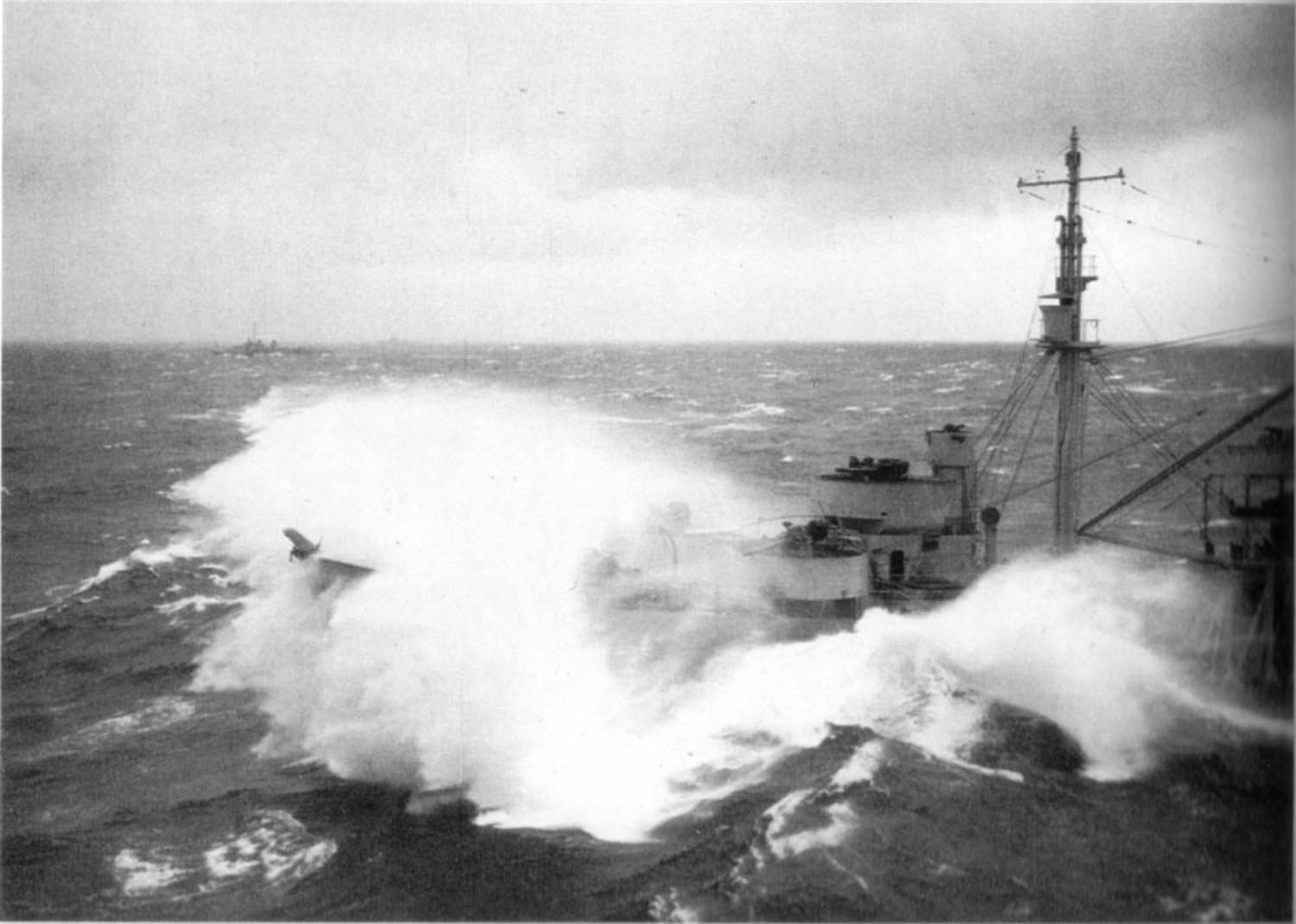
An oiler struggles to maintain position, 17 December 1944

The typhoon plays a central part in Herman Wouk's The Caine Mutiny.

== See also ==
- List of Pacific typhoon seasons
- Typhoon Connie (1945), which hit the same fleet in June 1945, lead to immediate formation of Fleet Warning Center in Guam.
- Typhoon Louise (1945) hit the U.S. fleet off Okinawa in October 1945.
