= USS Cape Esperance =

Casablanca-class escort carrier of the US Navy

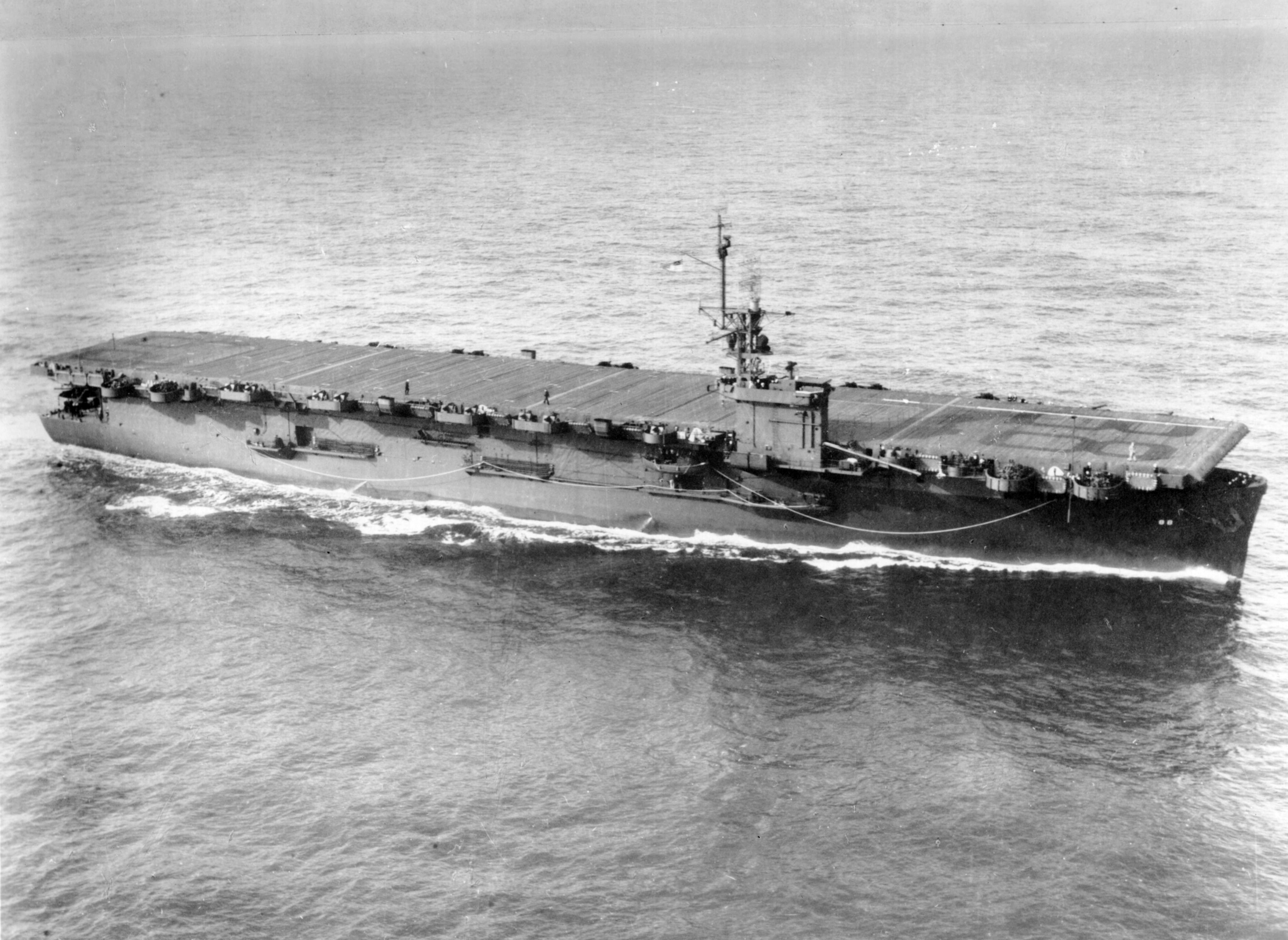
- USS Cape Esperance (CVE-88) underway, c. 1945

History

United States
- Name: Tananek Bay; Cape Esperance
- Namesake: Tonowek Bay, Prince of Wales Island; Battle of Cape Esperance
- Ordered: as a Type S4-S2-BB3 hull, MCE hull 1125
- Awarded: 18 June 1942
- Builder: Kaiser Shipyards
- Laid down: 11 December 1943
- Launched: 3 March 1944
- Commissioned: 9 April 1944
- Decommissioned: 22 August 1946
- Identification: Hull symbol: CVE-88
- In service: 5 August 1950
- Out of service: 15 January 1959
- Honors and awards: 2 Battle stars
- Fate: Sold for scrap, 14 May 1959

General characteristics
- Class & type: Casablanca-class escort carrier
- Displacement: 8,188 long tons (8,319 t) (standard); 10,902 long tons (11,077 t) (full load)
- Length: 512 ft 3 in (156.13 m) (oa); 490 ft (150 m) (wl); 474 ft (144 m) (fd)
- Beam: 65 ft 2 in (19.86 m); 108 ft (33 m) (extreme width)
- Draft: 20 ft 9 in (6.32 m) (max)
- Installed power: 4 × Babcock & Wilcox boilers; 9,000 shp (6,700 kW)
- Propulsion: 2 × Skinner Unaflow reciprocating steam engines; 2 × screws
- Speed: 19 knots (35 km/h; 22 mph)
- Range: 10,240 nmi (18,960 km; 11,780 mi) at 15 kn (28 km/h; 17 mph)
- Complement: Total: 910 – 916 officers and men; Embarked Squadron: 50 – 56; Ship's Crew: 860
- Armament: As designed: 1 × 5 in (127 mm)/38 cal dual-purpose gun; 4 × twin 40 mm (1.57 in) Bofors anti-aircraft guns; 12 × 20 mm (0.79 in) Oerlikon anti-aircraft cannons; Varied, ultimate armament: 1 × 5 in (127 mm)/38 cal dual-purpose gun; 8 × twin 40 mm (1.57 in) Bofors anti-aircraft guns; 20 × 20 mm (0.79 in) Oerlikon anti-aircraft cannons
- Aircraft carried: 27
- Aviation facilities: 1 × catapult; 2 × elevators

Service record
- Part of: United States Pacific Fleet (1944–1946); Pacific Reserve Fleet (1946–1950); Military Sealift Command (1950–1959)
- Operations: Operation Magic Carpet

USS Cape Esperance (CVE-88) was a Casablanca-class escort carrier of the United States Navy. She was named after the Battle of Cape Esperance, an inconclusive naval engagement in support of the Guadalcanal campaign. Built for service during World War II, the ship was launched in March 1944, and commissioned in April, and served as a replenishment carrier. Postwar, she participated in Operation Magic Carpet. She was decommissioned in August 1946, when she was mothballed in the Pacific Reserve Fleet. However, she was brought back into service in August 1950, and assigned to become an auxiliary vessel as a part of Military Sealift Command. She was decommissioned again in January 1959, and ultimately, she was sold for scrapping in May 1959.

== Design and description ==
A side profile of the design of Thetis Bay.

Cape Esperance was a Casablanca-class escort carrier, the most numerous type of aircraft carriers ever built. Built to stem heavy losses during the Battle of the Atlantic, they came into service in late 1943, by which time the U-boat threat was already in retreat. Although some did see service in the Atlantic, the majority were utilized in the Pacific, ferrying aircraft, providing logistics support, and conducting close air support for the island-hopping campaigns. The Casablanca-class carriers were built on the standardized Type S4-S2-BB3 hull, a lengthened variant of the Doyen-class hull, and specifically designed to be mass-produced using welded prefabricated sections. This allowed them to be produced at unprecedented speeds: the final ship of her class, Munda, was delivered to the Navy just 101 days after the laying of her keel.

Cape Esperance was 512 ft 3 in (156.13 m) long overall (490 ft (150 m) at the waterline), had a beam of 65 ft 2 in (19.86 m), and a draft of 20 ft 9 in (6.32 m). She displaced 8,188 long tons (8,319 t) standard, which increased to 10,902 long tons (11,077 t) with a full load. To carry out flight operations, the ship had a 257 ft (78 m) hangar deck and a 474 ft (144 m) flight deck. Her compact size necessitated the installation of an aircraft catapult at her bow, and there were two aircraft elevators to facilitate movement of aircraft between the flight and hangar deck: one each fore and aft.

She was powered by four Babcock & Wilcox Express D boilers that raised 285 psi (1,970 kPa) of steam at 577 °F (303 °C). The steam generated by these boilers fed two Skinner Unaflow reciprocating steam engines, delivering 9,000 hp (6,700 kW) to two propeller shafts. This allowed her to reach speeds of 19 kn (35 km/h; 22 mph), with a cruising range of 10,240 nmi (18,960 km; 11,780 mi) at 15 kn (28 km/h; 17 mph). For armament, one 5 in (127 mm)/38 caliber dual-purpose gun was mounted on the stern. Additional anti-aircraft defense was provided by eight Bofors 40 mm (1.57 in) anti-aircraft guns in single mounts and twelve Oerlikon 20 mm (0.79 in) cannons mounted around the perimeter of the deck. By 1945, Casablanca-class carriers had been modified to carry twenty Oerlikon cannons and sixteen Bofors guns; the doubling of the latter was accomplished by putting them into twin mounts. Sensors onboard consisted of a SG surface-search radar and a SK air-search radar.

Although Casablanca-class escort carriers were intended to function with a crew of 860 and an embarked squadron of 50 to 56, the exigencies of wartime often necessitated the inflation of the crew count. They were designed to operate with 27 aircraft, but the hangar deck could accommodate much more during transport or training missions.

== Construction ==
Her construction was awarded to Kaiser Shipbuilding Company, Vancouver, Washington under a Maritime Commission contract, on 18 June 1942, under the name Tananek Bay (a misspelling of "Tonowek Bay"), as part of a tradition which named escort carriers after bays or sounds in Alaska. The escort carrier was laid down on 11 December 1943, MC hull 1125, the thirty-fourth of a series of fifty Casablanca-class escort carriers. She therefore received the classification symbol CVE-88. On 6 November 1943, she was renamed Cape Esperance, as part of a new naval policy which named subsequent Casablanca-class carriers after naval or land engagements. She was named after the Battle of Cape Esperance, an early and inconclusive naval battle fought in support of the Guadalcanal campaign. She was launched on 3 March 1944; sponsored by Mrs. W. M. McDade; transferred to the United States Navy and commissioned on 9 April 1944, with Captain Robert Wurts Bockius in command.

== Service history ==
=== World War II ===
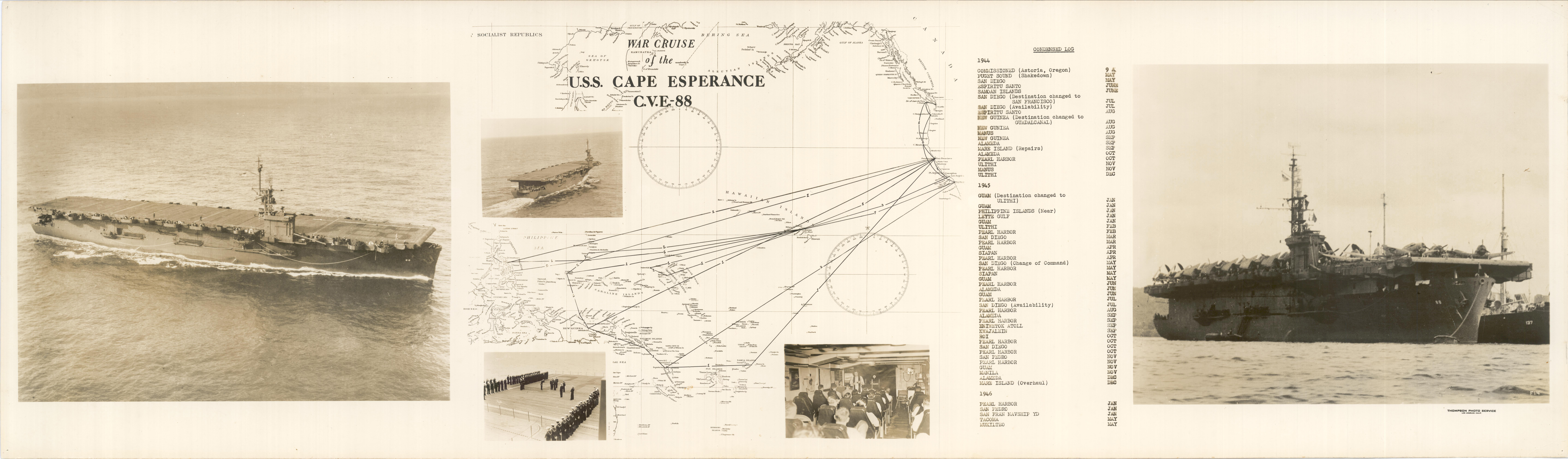
The sailing log of Cape Esperance, published in May 1946.

Upon being commissioned, Cape Esperance underwent a shakedown cruise down the West Coast to San Diego. She then underwent two transport missions, ferrying new aircraft to bases in the South and West Pacific, and returning to the West Coast with damaged aircraft. After returning from her second transport run, she was assigned to Task Group 30.8, the replenishment escort carrier group. She was loaded with replacement aircraft at San Francisco, and departed on 5 October 1944. She rendezvoused with the other replenishment carriers on 2 November, and provided replacement aircraft to the Fast Carrier Task Force operating against Japanese positions on Leyte and Luzon. The replenishment carriers would meet with the frontline carriers at designated rendezvous days, during which supplies and aircraft would be transferred. She was based from and received additional replacement aircraft at Ulithi and Guam.

The Third Fleet had been operating against positions on Luzon since 14 December, but its escorting destroyers ran low on fuel. As a result, the fleet retired to the east to refuel, and to receive replacement aircraft from Task Group 30.8. As a part of Task Unit 30.8.14, she rendezvoused with the Third Fleet about 300 mi (480 km; 260 nmi) east of Luzon early on 17 December. Cape Esperance was carrying thirty-nine planes on her flight deck, along with another twelve stored in her hangar deck. The location had been chosen because it lay out of range of Japanese fighters, but it also happened to lie within Typhoon Alley, where many Pacific tropical cyclones transited. As the escort carriers and the Third Fleet met, Typhoon Cobra began to bear down. At 01:00 in the night, fueling operations were attempted with the destroyers, although heavy winds and listing seas complicated the matter. At the same time, barometers on-board the ships began to drop, and tropical storm force winds were recorded.

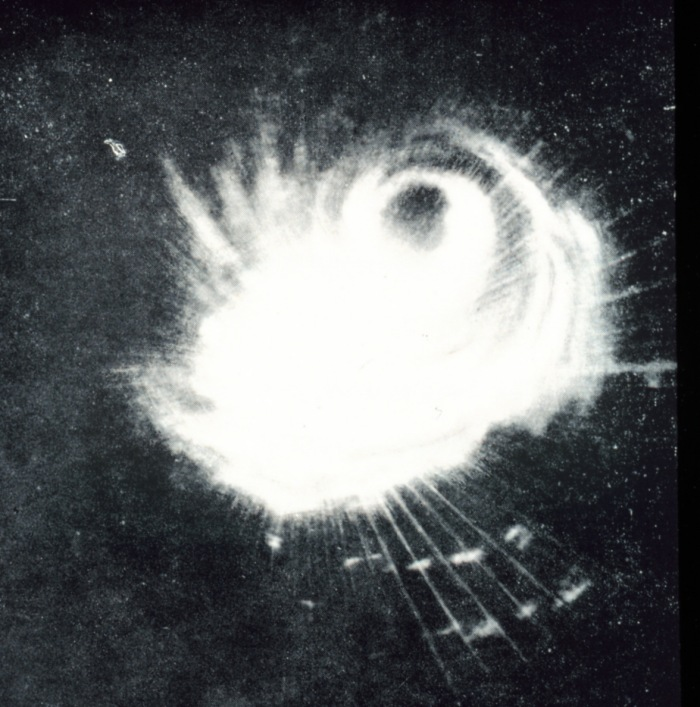
A radar image of Typhoon Cobra, 18 December 1944.

As the weather continued to deteriorate, Admiral William Halsey Jr. ordered fueling operations suspended at 13:10, just after noon. He ordered his fleet to move to the next morning's planned rendezvous spot, approximately 160 mi (260 km; 140 nmi) northwest, and comfortably safe from the typhoon's impacts. Two hours later, he instead ordered his fleet to proceed due southwards, 180 mi (290 km; 160 nmi) from where the fleet was located. This brought the fleet directly into the typhoon's core. To make matters worse for the Third Fleet, Halsey ordered the fleet to proceed northwards at 22:20, putting the fleet in the quadrant of the typhoon with the highest winds. Blurry data and observations meant that command had little idea of where the typhoon actually was, with some weather maps pinning the typhoon's center some 100 mi (160 km; 87 nmi) away, even whilst the fleet sailed directly into the eye. Attached to the Third Fleet, Cape Esperance followed, although Captain Bockius had begun preparations on 17 December. The aircraft on the flight deck had been tied down, weight had been transferred downwards to lower the ship's center of gravity, the hatches had been battened down, and the crew had been informed to stay on the port side of the carrier to counteract any list in the ship. The ship's aircraft elevators had also been lowered, in the hopes that this transferred weight would negate the lists generated from the wind.

At 07:00, on the morning of 18 December, the fleet was inescapably trapped in the typhoon's path. Conflicting orders meant that some of the destroyers attempted to do some fueling during the morning, even as waves with an estimated height of 60 ft (18 m) pounded the task force. At 09:52, Cape Esperance began maneuvering independently of the task force. Multiple rolls of 36° were recorded, and the occasional roll of 39° frightened the ship's command. The ship's officers discussed the possibility of cutting loose the aircraft on the flight deck to make the ship less top-heavy, but discarded the idea due to a shortage of volunteers. In any case, the typhoon's winds solved the weight problem, by ripping the aircraft on the flight deck from their restraints, and carrying them off into the ocean. However, at 12:28, an aircraft ended up stuck on the forward starboard stack, and caught on fire, forcing an evacuation of the bridge. Fortunately for the crew, as the carrier rocked and yawed, the plane was dislodged and carried overboard. The fire sparked by the aircraft, which had threatened to become a conflagration because of the aircraft's fuel tanks, ended up being extinguished by the rain.

The loss of most of the planes on the flight deck meant that Cape Esperance no longer threatened to keel over. At 16:00, another plane on the flight deck broke loose, and plummeted through the open forward aircraft elevator, landing on another plane. Fortunately for the crew, a fire did not result from this collision. As the carrier emerged from the typhoon, of the thirty-nine aircraft fastened to the flight deck, only seven remained. Although all of the planes in the hangar deck survived, eight planes were struck due to damage. As a result, she only had eleven replacement planes which she could deliver to the battered Third Fleet. Although 790 crewmen perished in the typhoon, none were from Cape Esperance. Her flight deck, damaged by the blaze, required major repairs.

She continued her duties as a replenishment carrier through the New Year, although repairs were made at bases in Guam and Ulithi. She retired from the replenishment carrier fleet in February 1945, heading back to the West Coast. There, she loaded aircraft, which she ferried to Guam. Until news of the surrender of Japan broke, she acted as a transport carrier, transporting newly minted aircraft from the United States to the West Pacific, in order to replace heavy war losses over Okinawa and the Japanese home islands. Whilst she was transporting aircraft, Captain Patrick Henry, Jr. took over command of the vessel on 3 May.

=== Post-war and Cold War ===
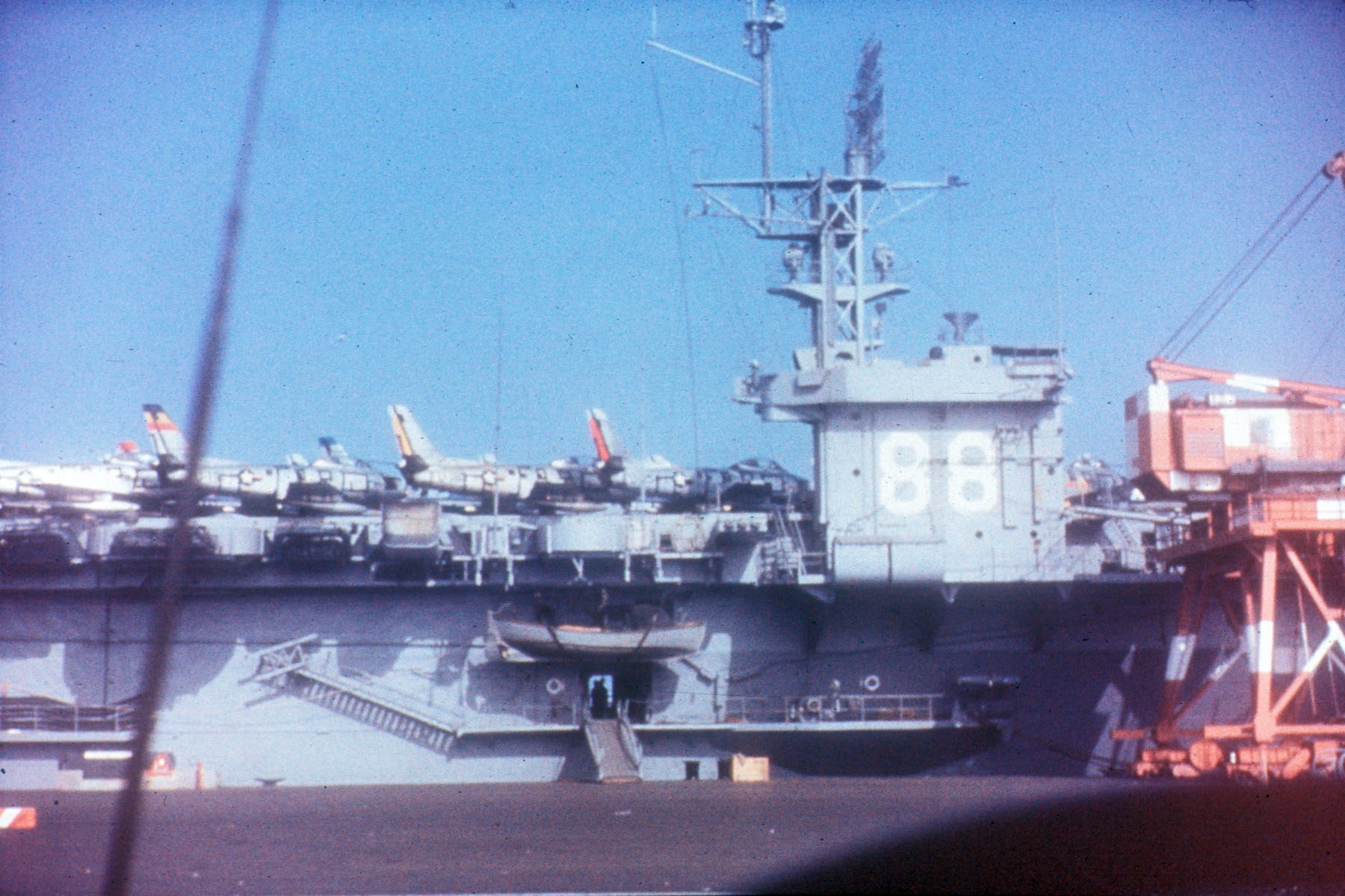
The first F-86 Sabre fighters arrive in Korea onboard Cape Esperance, November 1950.

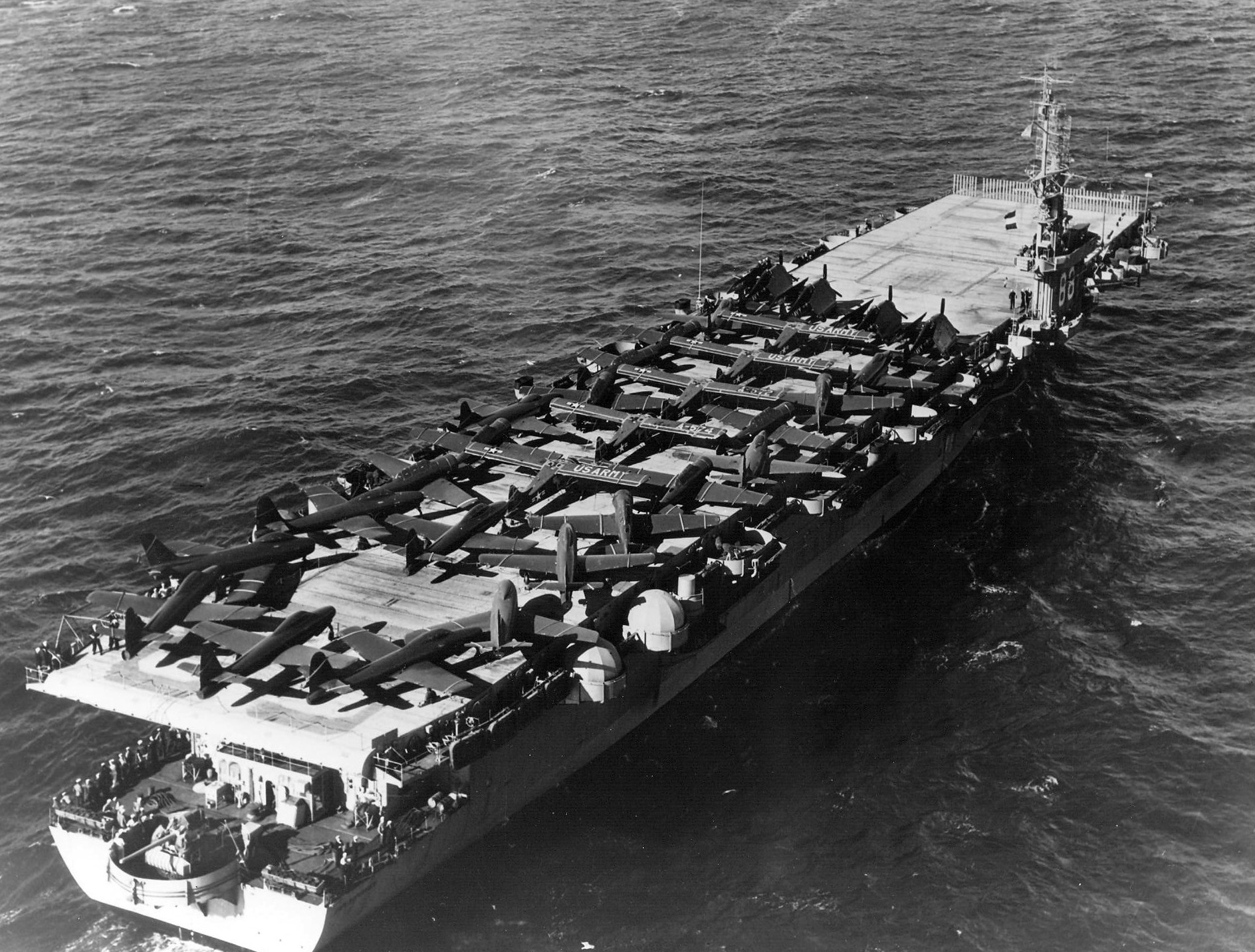
Cape Esperance transporting aircraft to Korea, c. 1951.

Following the end of the war, she joined the Operation Magic Carpet fleet, which repatriated U.S. servicemen from around the Pacific. She first made a run from San Diego to Pearl Harbor, ferrying aircraft and veterans to San Francisco, where she arrived on 11 September 1945. Until mid-1946, she made several such Magic Carpet runs, touching stops throughout the Pacific. After being released from the Magic Carpet fleet, she proceeded to Bremerton, Washington, where she was decommissioned on 22 August 1946, and subsequently mothballed in the Pacific Reserve Fleet.

Cape Esperance was brought back into service on 5 August 1950 under the identification T-CVE-88, as an aircraft transport carrier serving under the Military Sealift Command. Most of her weapons were stripped from her hull, and she was operated by a mostly civilian crew. Immediately after being put back into service, she began delivering aircraft to Japan, where they would participant in the Korean War. For the next nine years, Cape Esperance fulfilled a variety of duties, including supporting nuclear tests at Eniwetok, and ferrying aircraft to the Royal Thai Air Force. She engaged in an average of nine transpacific voyages per year, reinforcing forces of the Southeast Asia Treaty Organization, as well as U.S. assets in the Pacific. In 1952, she steamed for Hong Kong, where she evacuated planes previously belonging to the Republic of China that were hastily sold to Civil Air Transport to prevent being seized by advancing PLA forces. She was reclassified as a utility aircraft transport carrier, T-CVU-88, on 12 June 1955, and began conducting transatlantic voyages, ferrying aircraft to bases in Western Europe. She then returned to the Pacific, and proceeded to transport aircraft to Pakistan in 1956.

She was decommissioned a second time on 15 January 1959, as the operation of Casablanca-class escort carriers became less and less economical. She was abandoned in favor of Bogue-class escort carriers, who served for another decade as transport carriers, before they too became obsolete and uneconomical. She was sold for scrapping on 14 May 1959, and ultimately broken up in Japan throughout January 1961.

== Sources ==
=== Online sources ===
- "Cape Esperance (CVE-88)". Dictionary of American Naval Fighting Ships. Naval History and Heritage Command. 27 April 2016. Archived from the original on 2 June 2019.
- "Kaiser Vancouver, Vancouver WA". www.ShipbuildingHistory.com. 27 November 2010. Archived from the original on 16 June 2019.
- "World Aircraft Carriers List: US Escort Carriers, S4 Hulls". Hazegray.org. 14 December 1998. Archived from the original on 19 November 2021.
- Maksel, Rebecca (14 August 2012). "How Do You Name an Aircraft Carrier?". Air & Space/Smithsonian.
- Stubblebine, Daniel (June 2011). "Escort Carrier Makin Island (CVE-93)". ww2db.com.

=== Bibliography ===
- Adcock, Al (1996), Escort Carriers in Action - Warships No. 9, Carrollton, Texas: Squadron/Signal Publications, ISBN 9780897473569
- Chesneau, Robert; Gardiner, Robert (1980), Conway's All the World's Fighting Ships 1922–1946, London, England: Naval Institute Press, ISBN 9780870219139
- Friedman, Norman (1983), U.S. Aircraft Carriers: An Illustrated Design History, Annapolis, Maryland: Naval Institute Press, ISBN 9780870217395
- Ross, Al (1993), The Escort Carrier Gambier Bay, Anatomy of the Ship, London, England: Conway Maritime Press, ISBN 9781557502353
- Y'Blood, William (2012), The Little Giants: U.S. Escort Carriers Against Japan, Annapolis, Maryland: Naval Institute Press, ISBN 9781612512471
