= USS Kwajalein =

Casablanca-class escort carrier of the US Navy

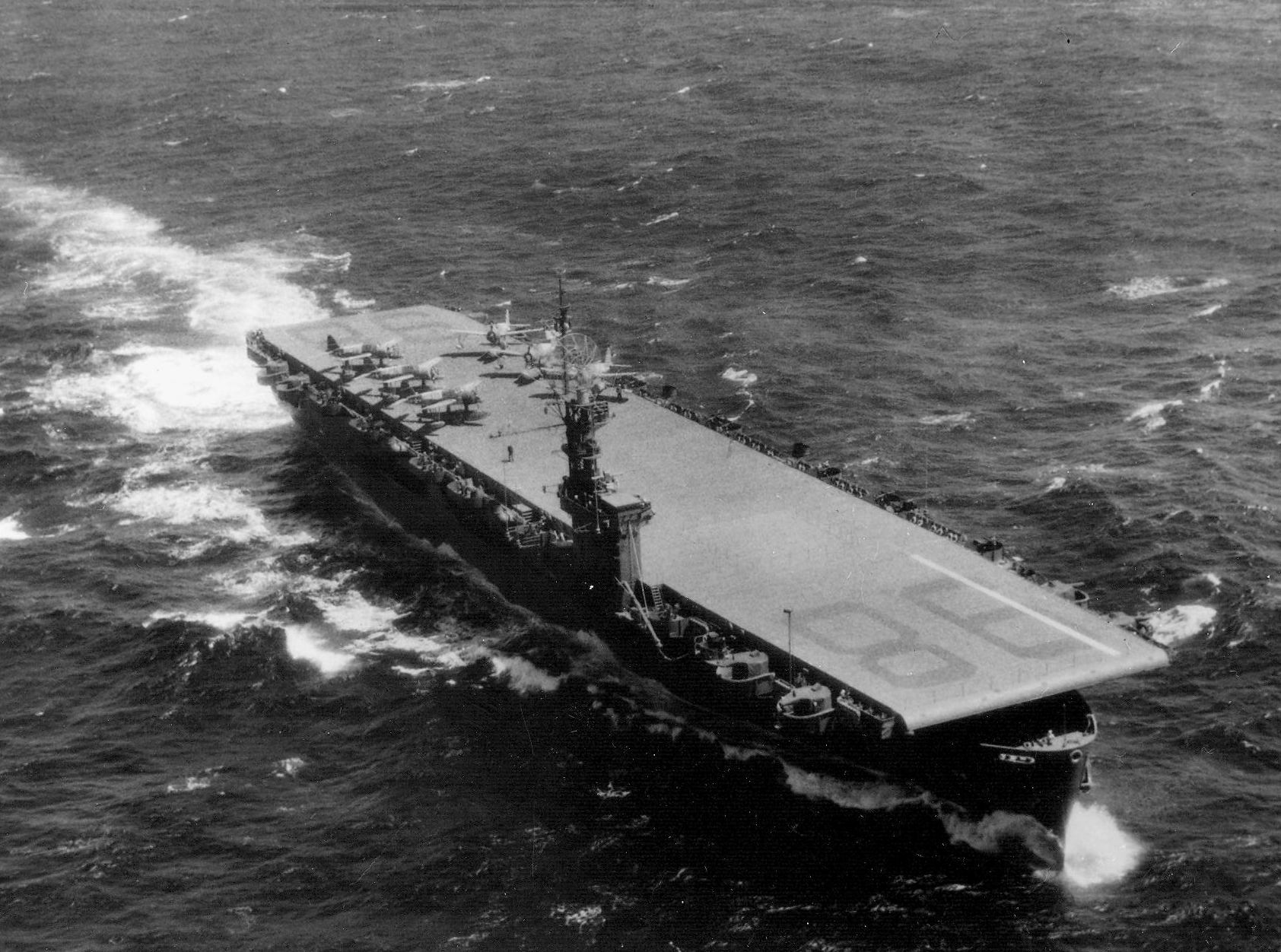
- USS Kwajalein (CVE-98), underway, June 1944

History

United States
- Name: Bucareli Bay; Kwajalein
- Namesake: Bucareli Bay, Baker Island, Alaska; Battle of Kwajalein
- Ordered: as a Type S4-S2-BB3 hull, MCE hull 1135
- Awarded: 18 June 1942
- Builder: Kaiser Shipyards
- Laid down: 19 February 1944
- Launched: 4 May 1944
- Commissioned: 7 June 1944
- Decommissioned: 16 August 1946
- Stricken: 1 April 1960
- Identification: Hull symbol: CVE-98
- Honors and awards: 2 Battle stars
- Fate: Sold for scrap, 11 January 1961

General characteristics
- Class & type: Casablanca-class escort carrier
- Displacement: 8,188 long tons (8,319 t) (standard); 10,902 long tons (11,077 t) (full load)
- Length: 512 ft 3 in (156.13 m) (oa); 490 ft (150 m) (wl); 474 ft (144 m) (fd)
- Beam: 65 ft 2 in (19.86 m); 108 ft (33 m) (extreme width)
- Draft: 20 ft 9 in (6.32 m) (max)
- Installed power: 4 × Babcock & Wilcox boilers; 9,000 shp (6,700 kW)
- Propulsion: 2 × Skinner Unaflow reciprocating steam engines; 2 × screws
- Speed: 19 knots (35 km/h; 22 mph)
- Range: 10,240 nmi (18,960 km; 11,780 mi) at 15 kn (28 km/h; 17 mph)
- Complement: Total: 910 – 916 officers and men; Embarked Squadron: 50 – 56; Ship's Crew: 860
- Armament: As designed: 1 × 5 in (127 mm)/38 cal dual-purpose gun; 4 × twin 40 mm (1.57 in) Bofors anti-aircraft guns; 12 × 20 mm (0.79 in) Oerlikon anti-aircraft cannons; Varied, ultimate armament: 1 × 5 in (127 mm)/38 cal dual-purpose gun; 8 × twin 40 mm (1.57 in) Bofors anti-aircraft guns; 20 × 20 mm (0.79 in) Oerlikon anti-aircraft cannons
- Aircraft carried: 27
- Aviation facilities: 1 × catapult; 2 × elevators

Service record
- Part of: United States Pacific Fleet (1944–1946); Pacific Reserve Fleet (1946–1960)
- Operations: Operation Magic Carpet

USS Kwajalein (CVE-98) was the forty-fourth of fifty Casablanca-class escort carriers built for the United States Navy during World War II. She was named after the Battle of Kwajalein, in which American forces captured Kwajalein Atoll. The ship was launched in May 1944, commissioned in June, and served in support of the Philippines campaign. Later in the war, she served as a replenishment carrier, during which she was damaged by Typhoon Cobra. Postwar, she participated in Operation Magic Carpet, repatriating U.S. servicemen from throughout the Pacific. She was decommissioned in May 1946, when she was mothballed in the Pacific Reserve Fleet. Ultimately, she was sold for scrapping in January 1961.

== Design and description ==
A side profile of the design of Thetis Bay.

Kwajalein was a Casablanca-class escort carrier, the most numerous type of aircraft carriers ever built. Built to stem heavy losses during the Battle of the Atlantic, they came into service in late 1943, by which time the U-boat threat was already in retreat. Although some did see service in the Atlantic, the majority were utilized in the Pacific, ferrying aircraft, providing logistics support, and conducting close air support for the island-hopping campaigns. The Casablanca-class carriers were built on the standardized Type S4-S2-BB3 hull, a lengthened variant of the Doyen-class hull, and specifically designed to be mass-produced using welded prefabricated sections. This allowed them to be produced at unprecedented speeds: the final ship of her class, Munda, was delivered to the Navy just 101 days after the laying of her keel.

Kwajalein was 512 ft 3 in (156.13 m) long overall (490 ft (150 m) at the waterline), had a beam of 65 ft 2 in (19.86 m), and a draft of 20 ft 9 in (6.32 m). She displaced 8,188 long tons (8,319 t) standard, which increased to 10,902 long tons (11,077 t) with a full load. To carry out flight operations, the ship had a 257 ft (78 m) hangar deck and a 474 ft (144 m) flight deck. Her compact size necessitated the installation of an aircraft catapult at her bow, and there were two aircraft elevators to facilitate movement of aircraft between the flight and hangar deck: one each fore and aft.

She was powered by four Babcock & Wilcox Express D boilers that raised 285 psi (1,970 kPa) of steam at 577 °F (303 °C). The steam generated by these boilers fed two Skinner Unaflow reciprocating steam engines, delivering 9,000 hp (6,700 kW) to two propeller shafts. This allowed her to reach speeds of 19 kn (35 km/h; 22 mph), with a cruising range of 10,240 nmi (18,960 km; 11,780 mi) at 15 kn (28 km/h; 17 mph). For armament, one 5 in (127 mm)/38 caliber dual-purpose gun was mounted on the stern. Additional anti-aircraft defense was provided by eight Bofors 40 mm (1.57 in) anti-aircraft guns in single mounts and twelve Oerlikon 20 mm (0.79 in) cannons mounted around the perimeter of the deck. By 1945, Casablanca-class carriers had been modified to carry twenty Oerlikon cannons and sixteen Bofors guns; the doubling of the latter was accomplished by putting them into twin mounts. Sensors onboard consisted of a SG surface-search radar and a SK air-search radar.

Although Casablanca-class escort carriers were intended to function with a crew of 860 and an embarked squadron of 50 to 56, the exigencies of wartime often necessitated the inflation of the crew count. They were designed to operate with 27 aircraft, but the hangar deck could accommodate much more during transport or training missions.

== Construction ==
Her construction was awarded to Kaiser Shipbuilding Company, Vancouver, Washington, under a Maritime Commission contract, on 18 June 1942. The escort carrier was laid down on 19 February 1944 under the name Bucareli Bay, as part of a tradition which named escort carriers after bays or sounds in Alaska. She was later renamed Kwajalein, as part of a new naval policy which named subsequent Casablanca-class carriers after naval or land engagements. The escort carrier was laid down as MC hull 1135, the forty-fourth of a series of fifty Casablanca-class escort carriers. She was launched on 4 May 1944; sponsored by Mrs. Rudolf L. Johnson; transferred to the United States Navy and commissioned on 7 June 1944.

== Service history ==
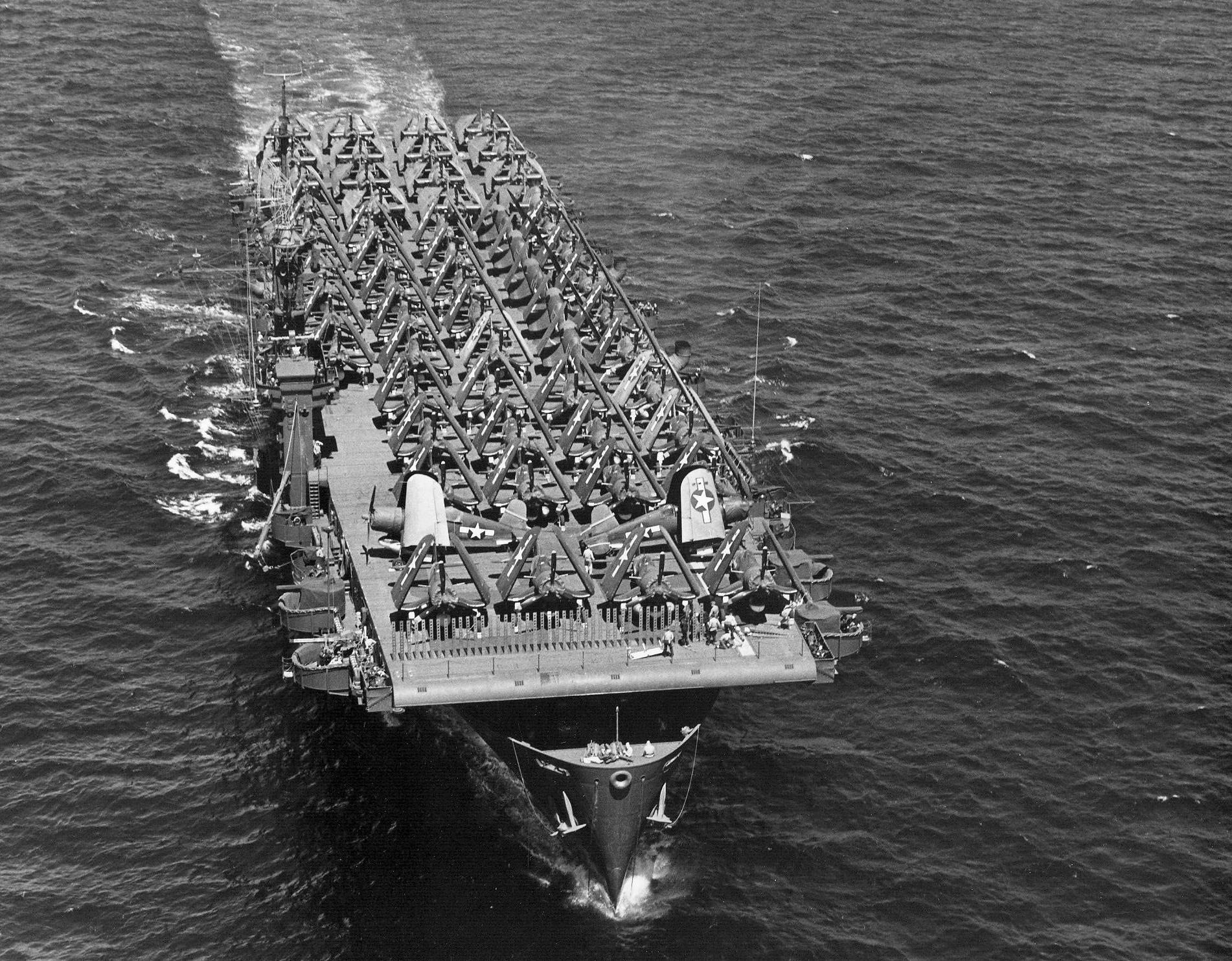
The packed flight deck of Kwajalein during a transport mission, 19 July 1944. Numerous Vought F4U Corsair fighters and Grumman TBF Avenger torpedo bombers are visible.

After commissioning, Kwajalein underwent a shakedown cruise down the West Coast to San Pedro. She then underwent a transport mission on 19 July to Espiritu Santo in the New Hebrides, ferrying military passengers and aircraft. She arrived on 3 August, and proceeded westwards on 7 August for Guam in the Mariana Islands, transporting additional aircraft. There, she took on a load of salvaged Japanese equipment, which she carried back to the United States for analysis.

Arriving at the West Coast, she underwent repairs and overhaul at San Diego. She was then assigned to replenishment carrier duties, departing on 7 October to support the Third Fleet's frontline Fast Carrier Task Force as part of Task Group 30.8, the Fleet Oiler and Transport Carrier Group. Replenishment escort carriers such as Kwajalein enabled the frontline carriers to replace battle losses and to stay at sea for longer durations of time. She took on a load of replacement aircraft at Manus Island in the Admiralty Islands, and sailed for Enewetak Atoll in the Marshall Islands on 5 November, where she rendezvoused with the replenishment carrier fleet. She was stationed off Manus and Ulithi in the Caroline Islands, where she received supplies and replacement aircraft. Her aircraft were sent to support U.S. forces in the Philippines campaign. During these duties, on 18 December, as part of Task Group 30.8.14, she weathered Typhoon Cobra.

The Third Fleet had been operating against positions on Luzon since 14 December, but its escorting destroyers ran low on fuel. As a result, the fleet retired to the east to refuel and to receive replacement aircraft from Task Group 30.8. She rendezvoused with the Third Fleet about 300 mi (480 km) east of Luzon early on 17 December. The location had been chosen because it lay out of range of Japanese fighters, but it also happened to lie within Typhoon Alley, where many Pacific tropical cyclones transited. As the escort carriers and the Third Fleet met, Typhoon Cobra began to bear down. At 01:00 on 18 December, fueling operations were attempted with the destroyers, although heavy winds and listing seas complicated the matter. At the same time, barometers on-board the ships began to drop, and tropical storm force winds were recorded. Some preparations were made onboard Kwajalein, with the aircraft on her flight deck being lashed down to prevent their loss.

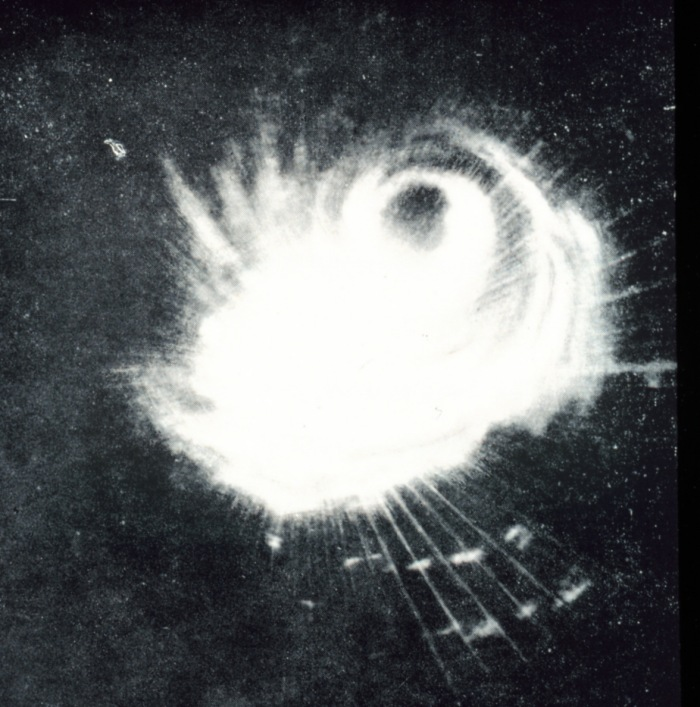
A radar image of Typhoon Cobra, 18 December 1944.

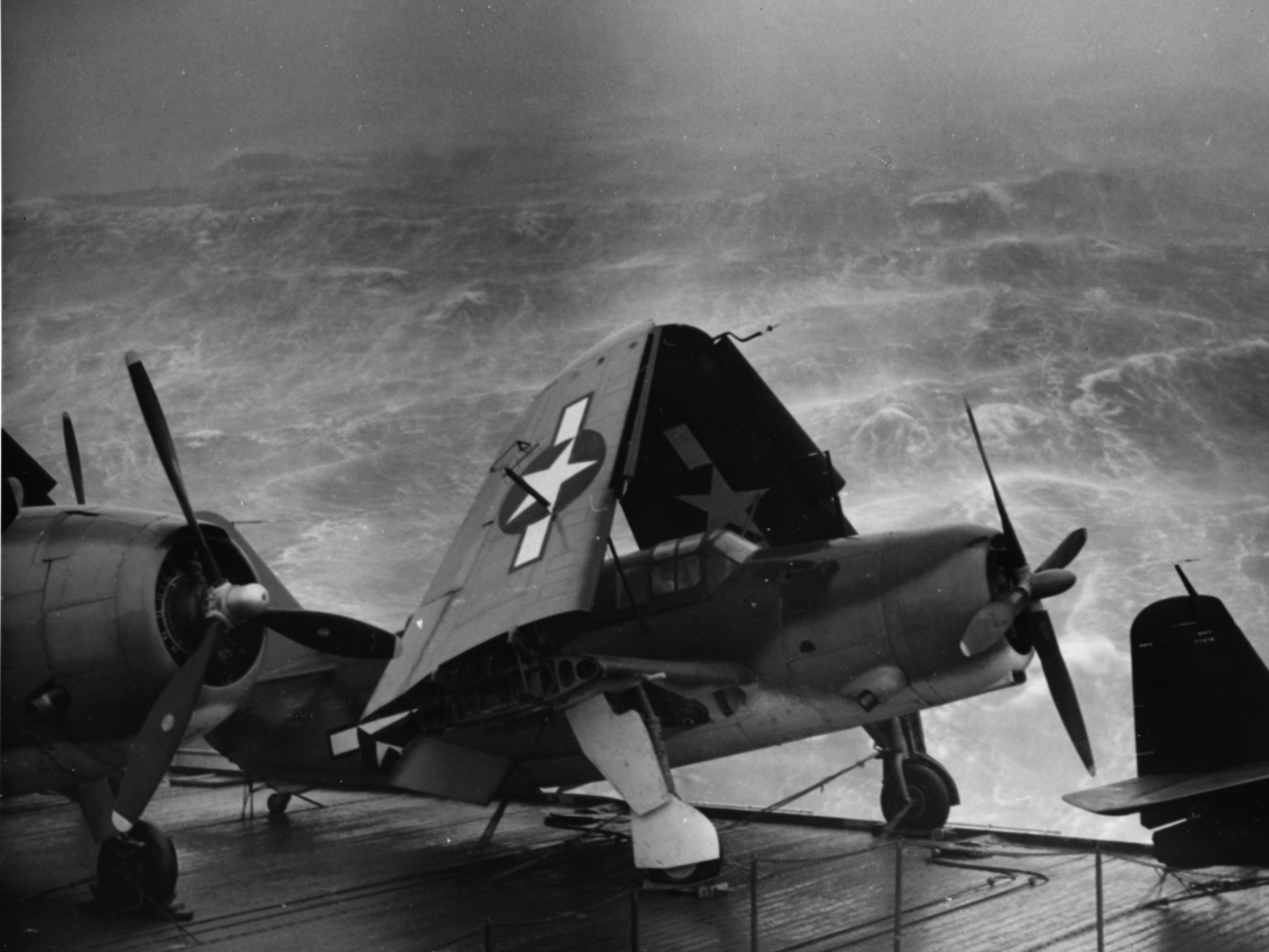
A Curtiss SB2C Helldiver dive bomber rocks in the midst of Typhoon Cobra. Note the restraints tying the aircraft to the flight deck.

As the weather continued to deteriorate, Admiral William Halsey Jr. ordered fueling operations suspended at 13:10. In a clumsy attempt to evade the cyclone, and misled by sketchy data, Halsey ordered several conflicting orders in quick succession, which ultimately brought Kwajalein and the rest of the escort carriers into the quadrant of the typhoon with the strongest winds.

At 07:00, the fleet was inescapably trapped in the typhoon's path. Conflicting orders meant that some of the destroyers attempted to do some fueling during the morning, even as waves with an estimated height of 60 ft (18 m) pounded the task force. At 07:22, Kwajalein came to course at 60°, along with her sisters Nehenta Bay and Rudyerd Bay. At 09:40, she lost most steering control, but careful manipulation of the rudder meant that Kwajalein only faced rolls of about 10°, and at the time, she fared much better than many of her fellow replenishment carriers. However, with visibility down to only 1,000 yd (910 m), each ship moving independently of each other, and the ship's lack of steering control, the ship's officers were gravely concerned about potential collisions.

Eventually, as she proceeded deeper into the typhoon's eyewall, her roll began to increase drastically. At one point, Warrick reported that she had rolled 39° to port, a very dangerous angle. At 13:00, a Grumman F6F Hellcat fighter broke free of its restraints, and rolled across the flight deck into a gun mount. Several crewmen, at great personal risk, shoved the plane overboard before it could wreak any more damage. During the height of the storm, two more planes were jettisoned off her flight deck, with two more damaged and rendered inoperational. However, the majority of her aircraft remained intact and usable, in stark contrast to some of the other escort carriers who went through the typhoon, which had almost their entire aircraft contingent ejected or damaged beyond repair. Only minor damage was dealt to Kwajalein, and she was able to continue operating as a replenishment carrier.

Later, in January 1945, she transitioned northwards, providing replacement aircraft in support of the Fast Carrier Task Force, which was operating against Japanese bases along the Formosan and Chinese coasts. Upon completing her duties, she was discharged from the replenishment carrier fleet, steaming back to the United States. She returned on San Diego on 23 February, where she underwent overhaul, and received a load of aircraft.

After completing her overhaul, she proceeded to Pearl Harbor with her load of aircraft. There, she served as a transport carrier until the cession of hostilities with Japan. She conducted three transport runs from Hawaii to bases in the West Pacific, ferrying aircraft, supplies, and munitions. The aircraft she transported helped replace losses sustained in raids against the Japanese home islands. During these transport runs, Captain Charles Murray Heberton took over command of the vessel on 15 July 1945.

After news of the Japanese surrender broke, she joined the Operation Magic Carpet fleet, which repatriated U.S. servicemen from around the Pacific. In total, she made four Magic Carpet runs, making stops throughout the Pacific. She arrived at San Pedro on 2 February 1946, whereupon she was discharged from the Magic Carpet fleet. On 23 April, she departed San Pedro, and sailed north for Mukilteo, Washington, arriving there on 5 February. She then proceeded to Pacific Reserve Fleet, Tacoma in Tacoma, Washington, where inactivation work was conducted. She was decommissioned on 16 August, and mothballed as part of the Pacific Reserve Fleet. She was redesignated as a utility aircraft carrier, CVU-98, on 12 June 1955. She was once again redesignated, this time as an aircraft transport, AKV-34, on 7 May 1959. She was struck from the Navy list on 1 April 1960, and sold for scrapping. She was ultimately broken up in Japan sometime in 1961. She received two battle stars for her World War II service.

== Sources ==
=== Online sources ===
- "Kwajalein (CVE-98)". Dictionary of American Naval Fighting Ships. Naval History and Heritage Command. 28 July 2015. Archived from the original on 22 November 2019.
- "Kaiser Vancouver, Vancouver WA". www.ShipbuildingHistory.com. 27 November 2010. Archived from the original on 16 June 2019.
- "World Aircraft Carriers List: US Escort Carriers, S4 Hulls". Hazegray.org. 14 December 1998. Archived from the original on 19 November 2021.
- Maksel, Rebecca (14 August 2012). "How Do You Name an Aircraft Carrier?". Air & Space/Smithsonian.
- Stubblebine, Daniel (June 2011). "Escort Carrier Makin Island (CVE-93)". ww2db.com.

=== Bibliography ===
- Adcock, Al (1996), Escort Carriers in Action - Warships No. 9, Carrollton, Texas: Squadron/Signal Publications, ISBN 9780897473569
- Chesneau, Robert; Gardiner, Robert (1980), Conway's All the World's Fighting Ships 1922–1946, London, England: Naval Institute Press, ISBN 9780870219139
- Friedman, Norman (1983), U.S. Aircraft Carriers: An Illustrated Design History, Annapolis, Maryland: Naval Institute Press, ISBN 9780870217395
- Ross, Al (1993), The Escort Carrier Gambier Bay, Anatomy of the Ship, London, England: Conway Maritime Press, ISBN 9781557502353
- Y'Blood, William (2012), The Little Giants: U.S. Escort Carriers Against Japan, Annapolis, Maryland: Naval Institute Press, ISBN 9781612512471
