= 1944 Pacific typhoon season =

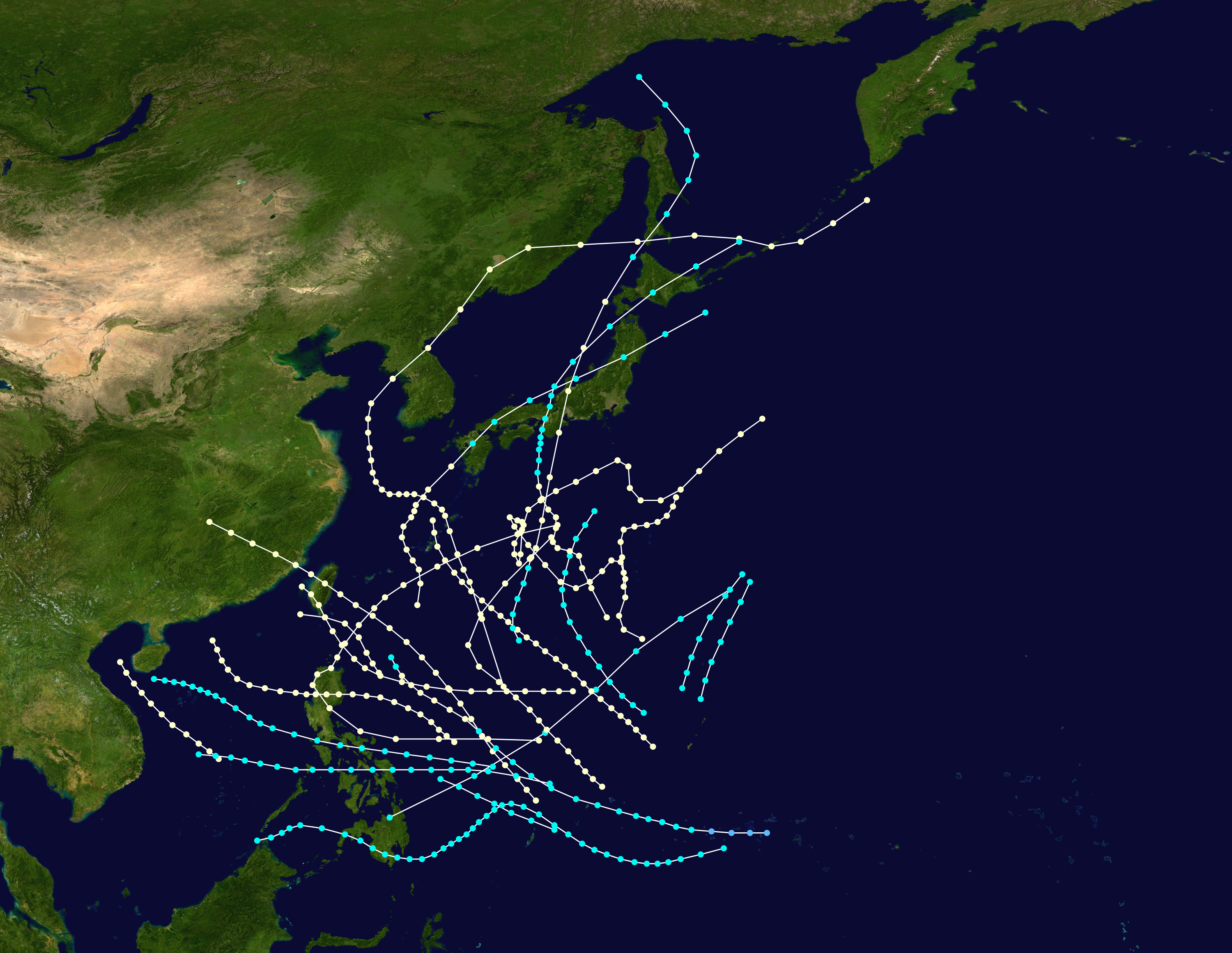
- Season summary map

Seasonal boundaries
- First system formed: January 7, 1944
- Last system dissipated: December 19, 1944

Strongest storm
- Name: Cobra
  - Maximum winds: 260 km/h (160 mph) (1-minute sustained)
  - Lowest pressure: 924 hPa (mbar)

Seasonal statistics
- Total storms: 23
- Total fatalities: >790
- Total damage: Unknown

Related articles
- 1944 Atlantic hurricane season; 1942–1948 Pacific hurricane seasons; 1940s North Indian Ocean cyclone seasons

The 1944 Pacific typhoon season was the last Pacific typhoon season to not be included in the Pacific typhoon database. It has no official bounds; it ran year-round in 1944, but most tropical cyclones tend to form in the northwestern Pacific Ocean between June and December. These dates conventionally delimit the period of each year when most tropical cyclones form in the northwestern Pacific Ocean. The scope of this article is limited to the Pacific Ocean, north of the equator and west of the International Date Line. Storms that form east of the date line and north of the equator are called hurricanes; see 1944 Pacific hurricane season.

There were 23 tropical cyclones in 1944 in the western Pacific, including Typhoon Cobra.

== Systems ==
=== Tropical Storm 01W ===
- Tropical storm (SSHWS)
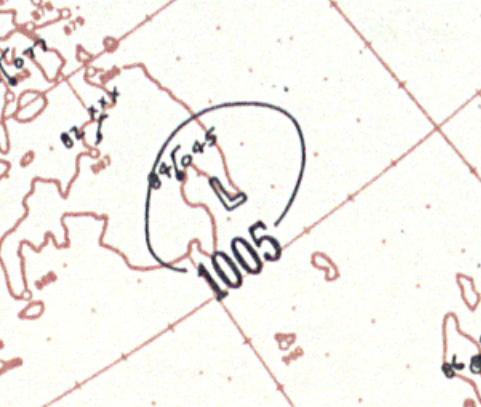
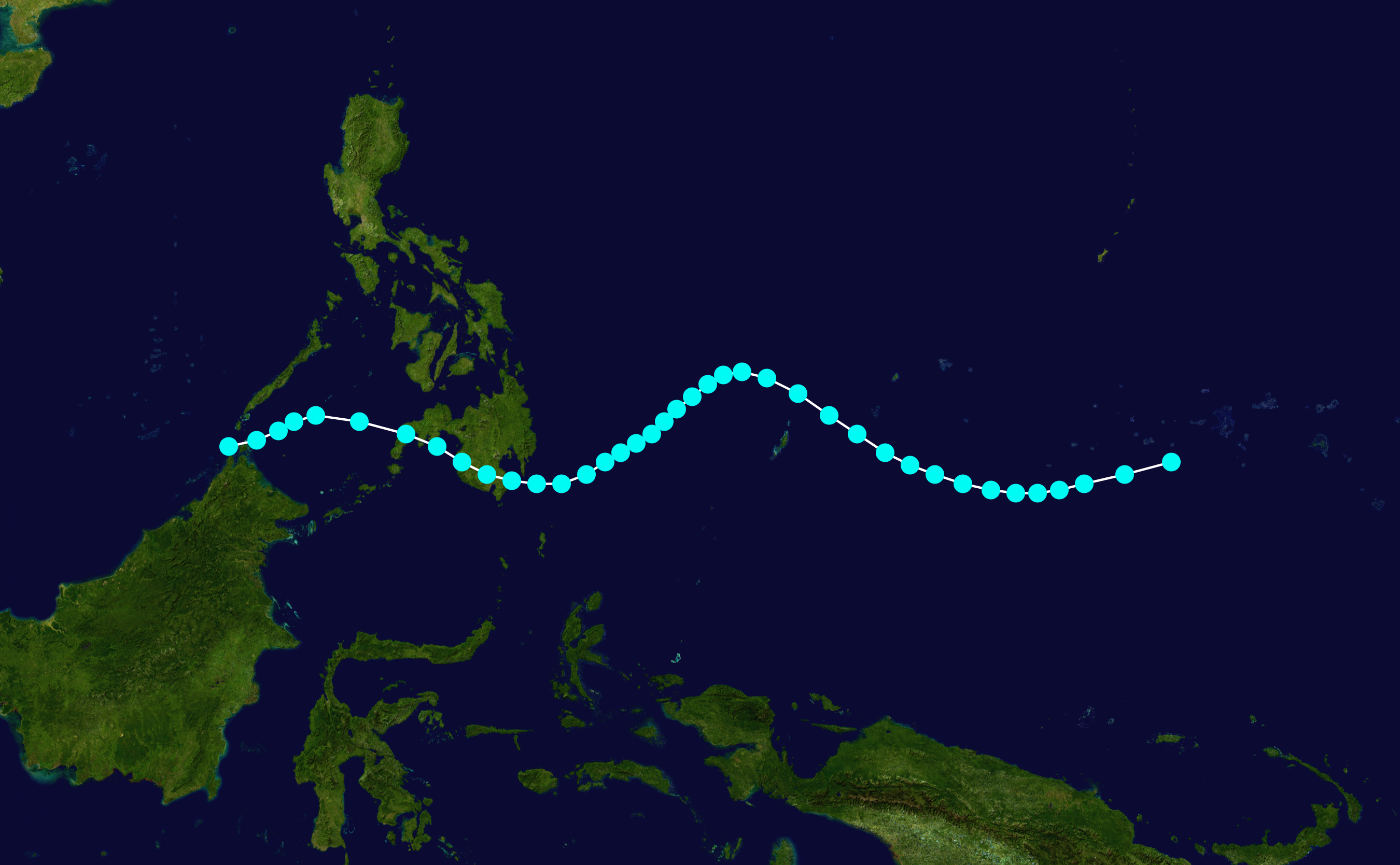
- Duration: January 7 – January 17
- Peak intensity: 65 km/h (40 mph) (1-min); ≤1005 hPa (mbar)

A long lived slow-moving and erratic tropical storm. The storm formed southwest of Micronesia, turned to the north and the west of Palau and made landfall in Mindanao.

=== Tropical Storm 02W ===
- Tropical storm (SSHWS)
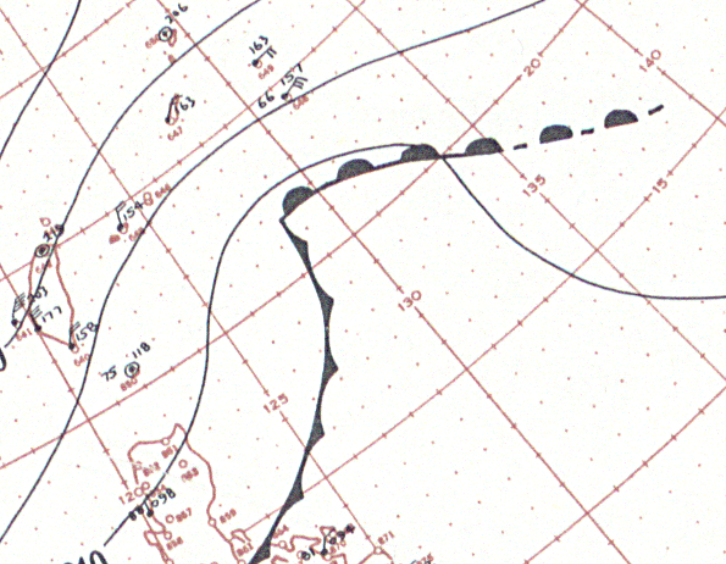
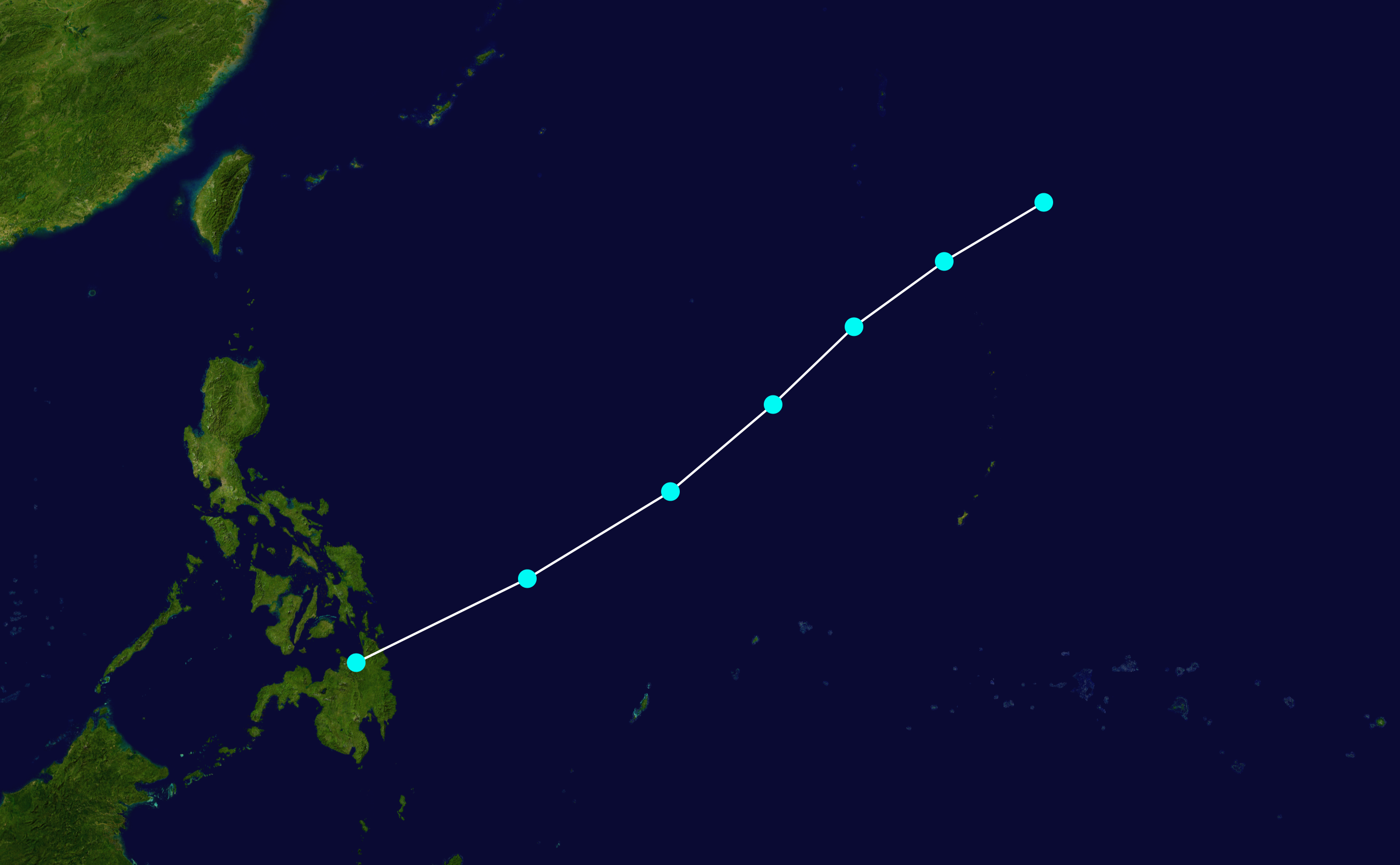
- Duration: February 17 – February 19
- Peak intensity: 85 km/h (50 mph) (1-min); ≤1000 hPa (mbar)

Short-lived storm moving quickly to the northeast. There are many indications that this system was not tropical, such as attached fronts throughout its entire noted life.

=== Tropical Storm 03W ===
- Tropical storm (SSHWS)
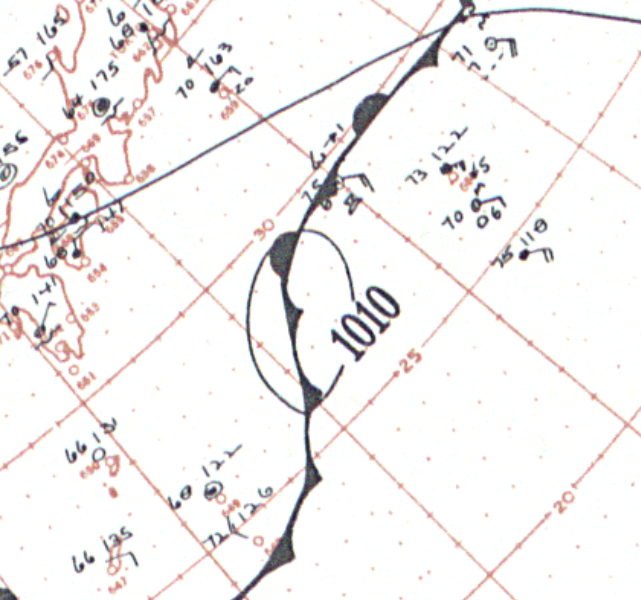
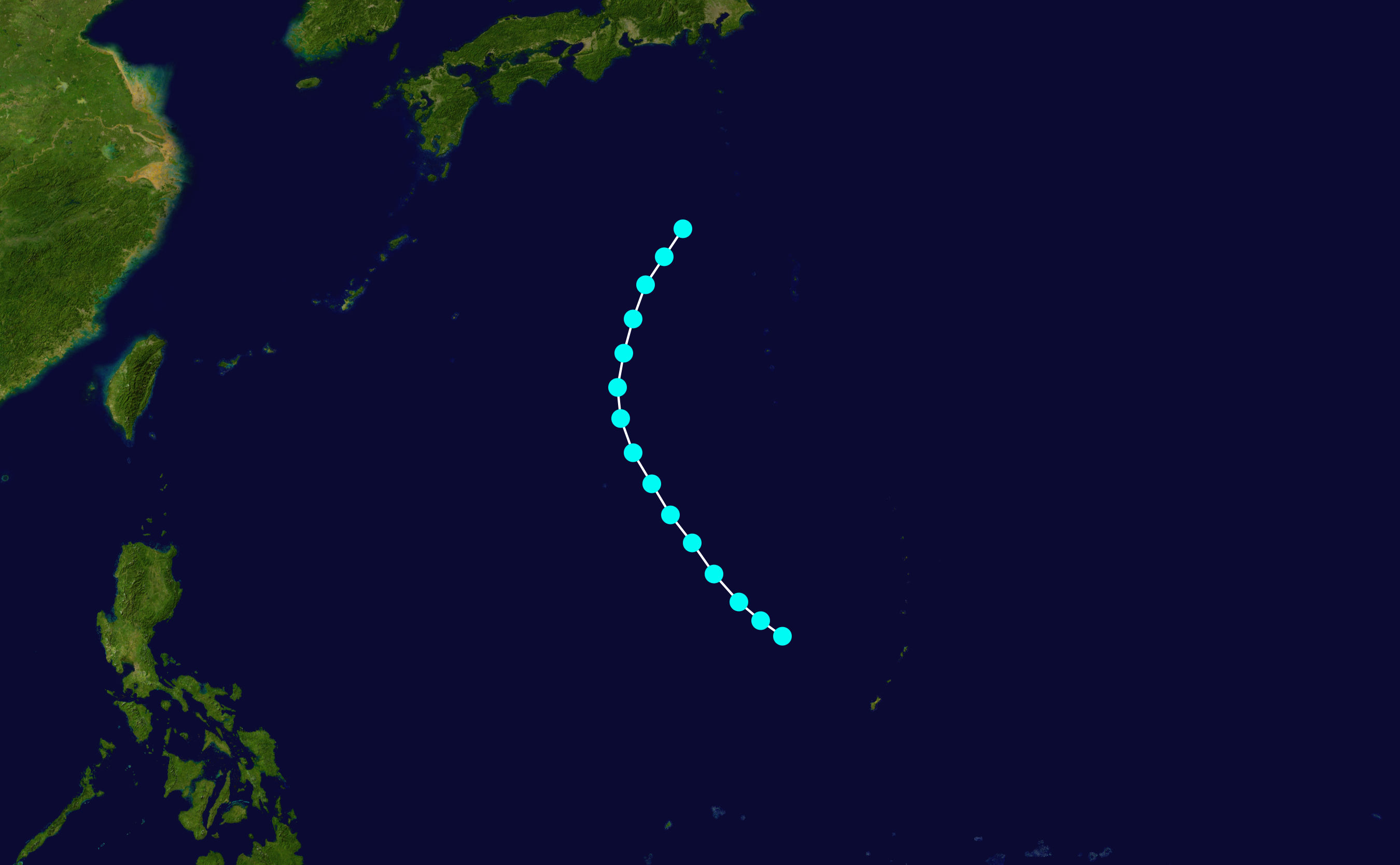
- Duration: May 12 – May 16
- Peak intensity: 65 km/h (40 mph) (1-min); ≤1010 hPa (mbar)

The storm formed near Guam. The storm moved in a northern direction in the Pacific Ocean before dissipating on May 16.

=== Typhoon 04W ===
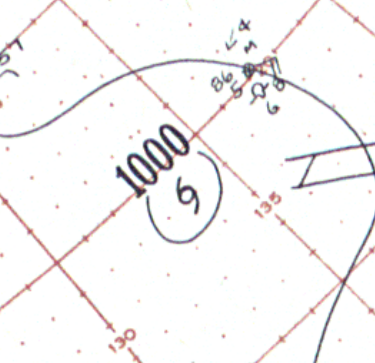
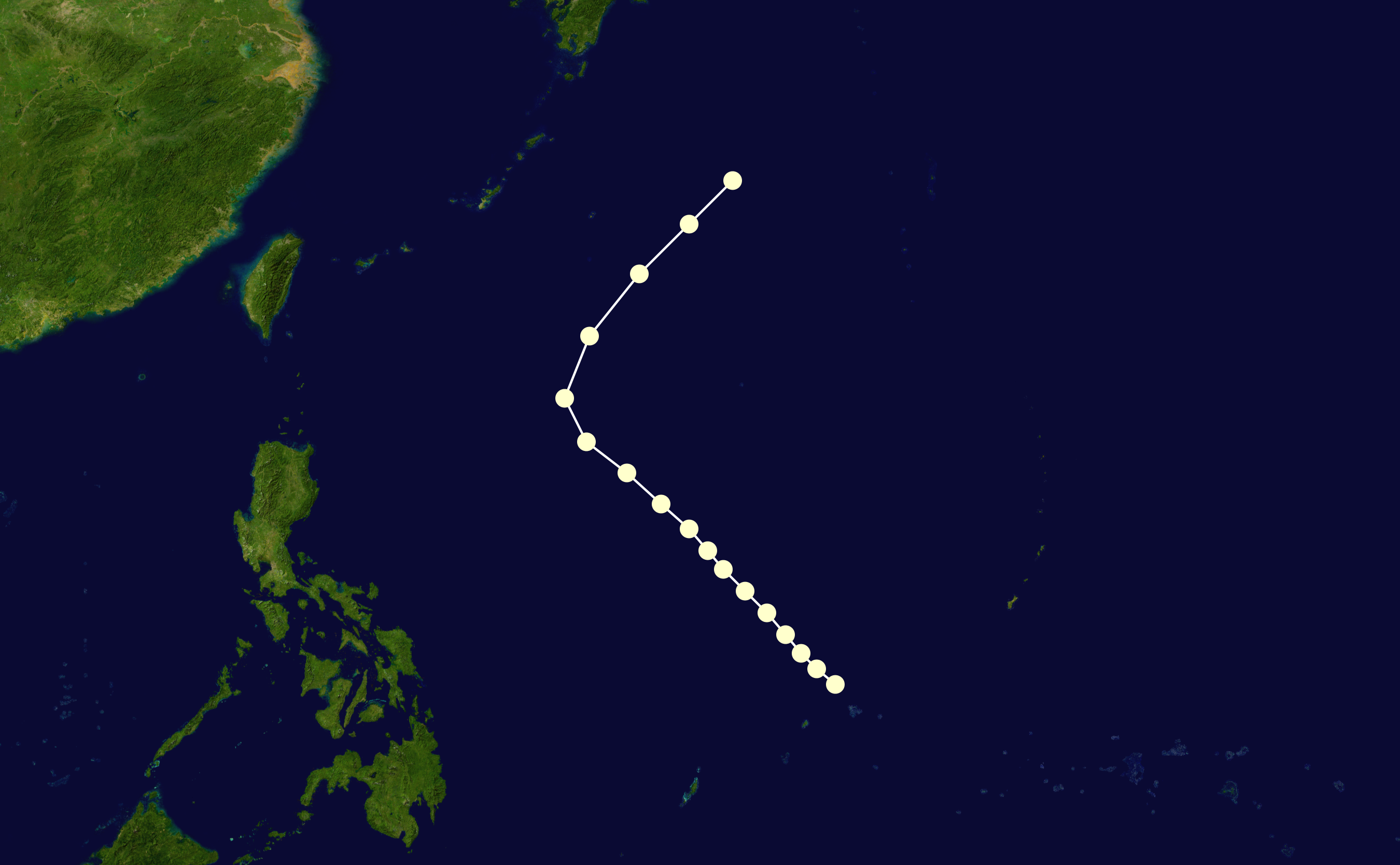
- Duration: June 11 – June 15
- Peak intensity: Winds not specified; ≤1000 hPa (mbar)

This typhoon formed in the northwest of Micronesia, tracked to the northwest direction and recurved to the northeast of Philippines before dissipating.

=== Typhoon 06W ===
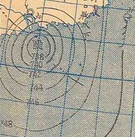
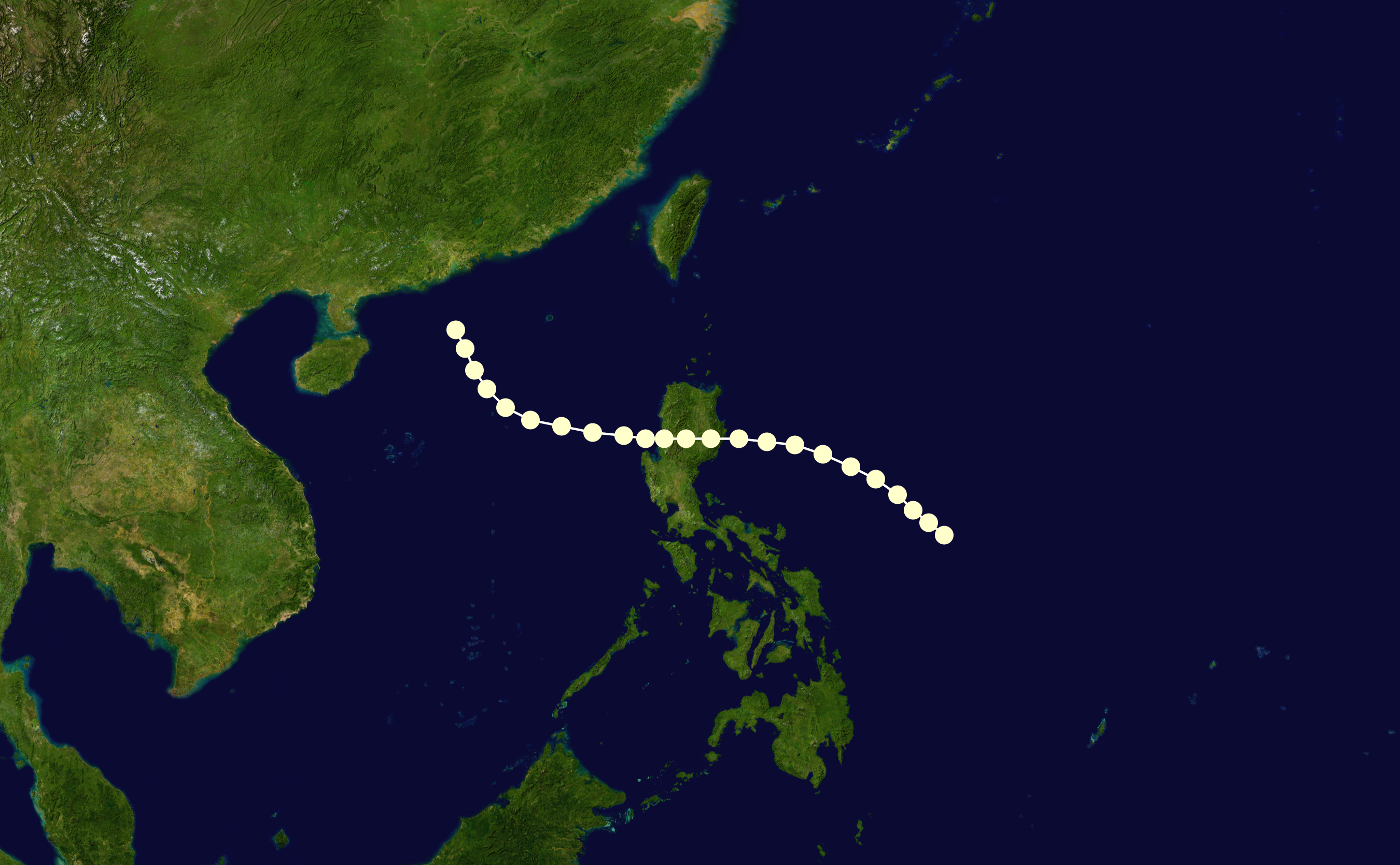
- Duration: July 15 – July 21
- Peak intensity: Winds not specified; ≤1000 hPa (mbar)

This typhoon made landfall in the Philippines as a typhoon.

=== Super Typhoon Cobra ===
- Category 5 super typhoon (SSHWS)
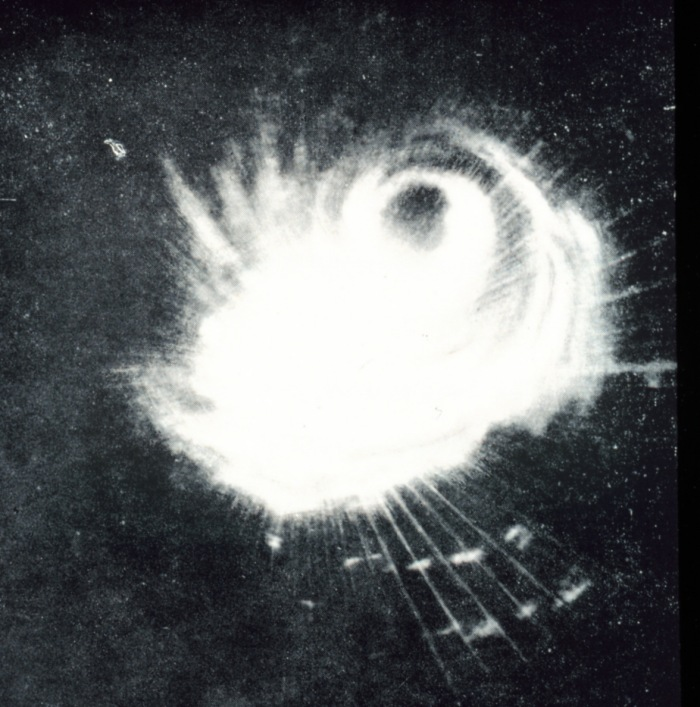
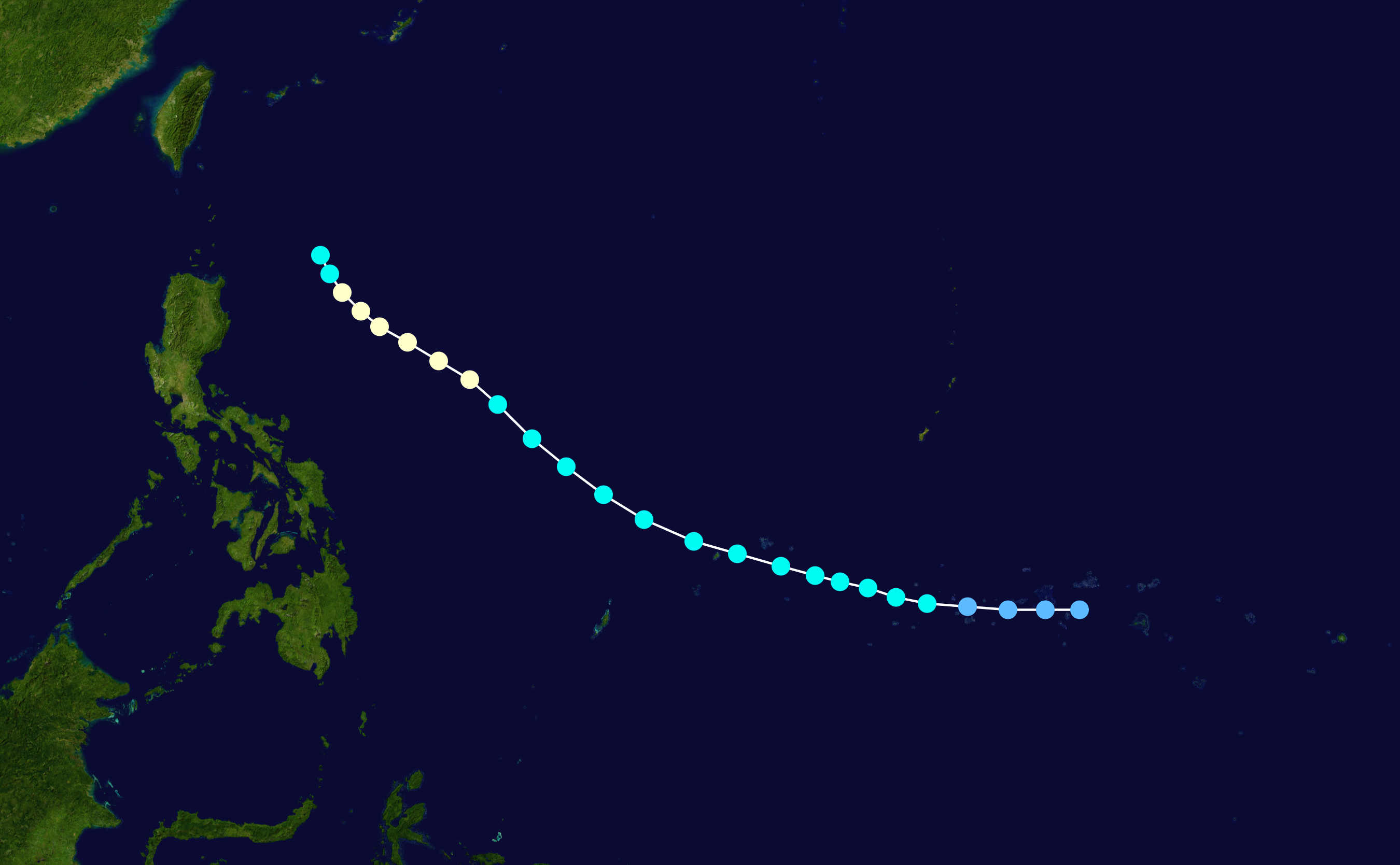
- Duration: December 14 – December 19
- Peak intensity: 260 km/h (160 mph) (1-min); 924 hPa (mbar)

Typhoon Cobra was first spotted on December 17, in the Philippine Sea. It sank three US destroyers, killing at least 790 sailors, before dissipating the next day.

== See also ==
- Pacific typhoon season
- 1900–1950 South-West Indian Ocean cyclone seasons
- 1940s Australian region cyclone seasons
- 1940s South Pacific cyclone seasons
