= USS Ulvert M. Moore =

1944 John C. Butler-class destroyer escort

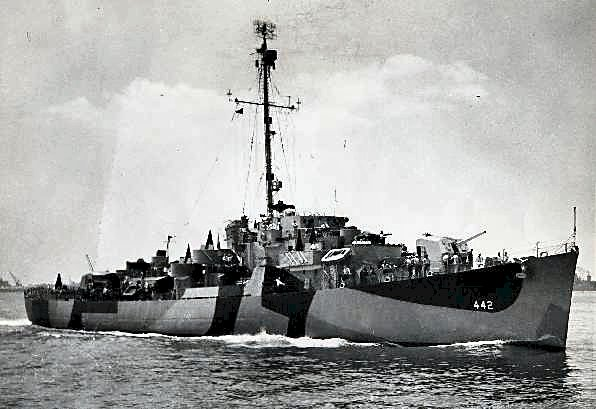
- USS Ulvert M. Moore (DE-442), builder's photo, July 1944.

History

United States
- Name: Ulvert M. Moore
- Namesake: Ulvert M. Moore
- Builder: Federal Shipbuilding & Drydock Company, Port Newark, New Jersey
- Laid down: 2 December 1943
- Launched: 7 March 1944
- Sponsored by: Mrs. L. E. Moore, mother of Ens. Moore
- Commissioned: 18 July 1944
- Decommissioned: 22 May 1946
- In service: 27 January 1951
- Out of service: 10 October 1958
- Stricken: 1 December 1965
- Identification: Hull symbol:DE-442; Code letters:NTKH
- Fate: Sunk as target off San Nicholas Isle, California on 13 July 1966

General characteristics
- Class & type: John C. Butler-class destroyer escort
- Displacement: 1,350 long tons (1,372 t) (standard); 1,745 long tons (1,773 t) (full load)
- Length: 306 ft (93 m) (oa)
- Beam: 36 ft 10 in (11.23 m)
- Draught: 13 ft 4 in (4.06 m) (max)
- Installed power: 2 × boilers; 12,000 shp (8,900 kW)
- Propulsion: 2 × geared steam turbines; 2 × screws
- Speed: 24 kn (28 mph; 44 km/h)
- Range: 6,000 nmi at 12 kn (14 mph; 22 km/h)
- Complement: 14 officers, 201 enlisted
- Armament: 2 × 5 in (130 mm)/38 caliber guns; 4 × 40 mm (1.6 in) Bofors guns (2×2); 10 × 20 mm (0.79 in) Oerlikon cannons; 3 × 21-inch (533 mm) Torpedo tubes; 1 × Hedgehog, 8 × Mk6 depth charge projectors; 2 × Mk9 stern depth charge tracks

USS Ulvert M. Moore (DE-442) was a John C. Butler-class destroyer escort acquired by the U.S. Navy during World War II. The primary purpose of the destroyer escort was to escort and protect ships in convoy, in addition to other tasks as assigned, such as patrol or radar picket. Post-war she returned home bearing five battle stars; when she was reactivated for the Korean War, she returned home after that war with three more.

Ulvert M. Moore (DE-442) was named in honor of Ulvert Matthew Moore (1917–1942), a U.S. Navy pilot who was awarded the Navy Cross medal posthumously for his service with Torpedo Squadron 8 during the Battle of Midway.

== Namesake ==
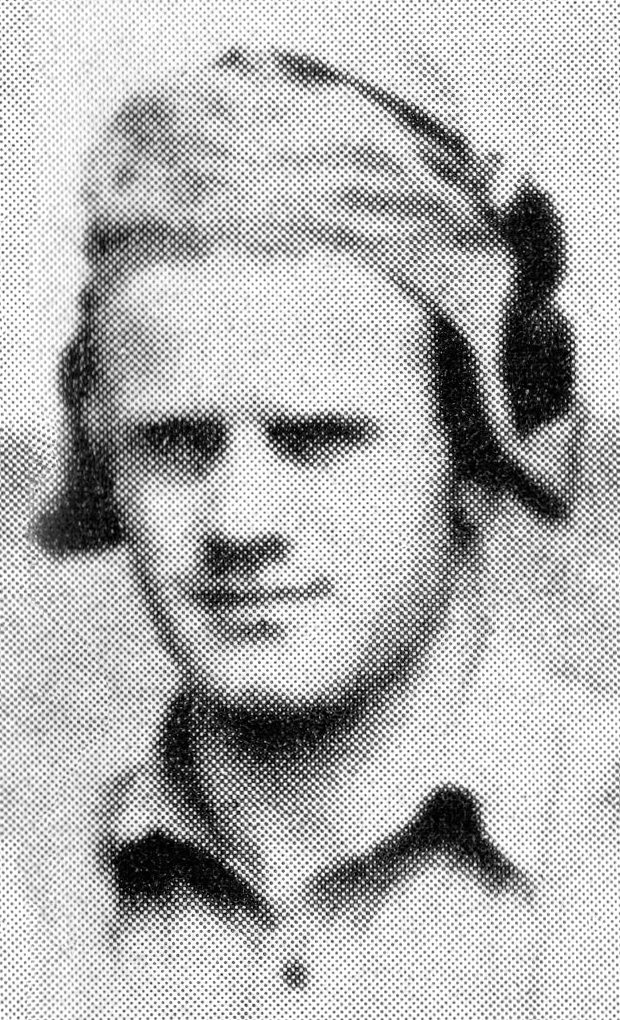
Moore aboard the USS Hornet (1942)

Ulvert Matthew Moore was born on 26 August 1917 in Williamson, West Virginia. He enlisted in the Naval Reserve on 15 October 1940 at Washington, D.C., and served as a seaman 2d class until appointed an aviation cadet on 14 January 1941. After flight training at Jacksonville and Miami, into the summer of 1941, Moore then received advanced carrier training at Norfolk, Virginia. He was then assigned to Torpedo Squadron 8 (VT-8), operating from the USS Hornet.

As a Douglas TBD Devastator torpedo bomber pilot in VT-8, Ensign Moore took part in the pivotal Battle of Midway on 4 June 1942. Moore and the rest of the squadron attacked the Japanese aircraft carriers without fighter cover and in the face of withering anti-aircraft fire and heavy Japanese fighter opposition. Though all of VT-8's aircraft were shot down, they succeeded in diverting Japanese fighter cover and preventing further launches of Japanese carrier aircraft, thus contributing to the United States Navy's victory in the battle. Moore was killed during the attack and was awarded the Navy Cross posthumously and shared in the Presidential Unit Citation awarded to VT-8 for its actions in the Battle of Midway.

== Service history ==
=== World War II ===
She was laid down on 2 December 1943 at Houston, Texas, by the Brown Shipbuilding Co.; launched on 7 March 1944; sponsored by Mrs. L. E. Moore, mother of Ens. Moore; and commissioned on 18 July 1944, Lt. Comdr. Franklin D. Roosevelt, Jr., USNR—the son of the President—in command. Following shakedown off Bermuda, the destroyer escort screened USS Shamrock Bay from New York to Norfolk, Virginia, on 18 September before departing the latter port on 5 October in company with USS Kendall C. Campbell (DE-443). The two ships escorted USS Taluga (AO-62) and USS Aucilla to Aruba, Dutch West Indies, and thence conveyed them to the Panama Canal Zone before continuing on by themselves to the west coast of the United States, arriving at San Diego, on 22 October. Ulvert M. Moore and her sister ship subsequently sailed for the Hawaiian Islands, escorting USS Colorado (BB-45) from San Pedro, Los Angeles, to Pearl Harbor between 24 and 30 October.

When Ulvert M. Moore had refueled there, urgent orders sent her to sea to join a hunter-killer group based around USS Corregidor (CVE-58) which was searching for Japanese submarine I-12. That Japanese submarine had torpedoed and sunk the American merchantman SS John A. Johnson on 30 October. Corregidor's unit, designated Task Group (TG) 12.3, operated between Hawaii and the west coast until 19 November, when it returned to Pearl Harbor. After repairs alongside USS Yosemite from 20 to 23 November, Ulvert M. Moore put to sea on the 24th with TG 12.4, centered around USS Tulagi, bound for the Carolines, via Eniwetok in the Marshalls. TG 12.4 conducted antisubmarine patrols en route and reached Eniwetok on 2 December and Ulithi on the 7th. Upon its arrival at the latter, the group was reclassified TG 30.6. The destroyer escort and her mates then operated on antisubmarine patrols in an area from the Marianas in the north to the Palaus in the south.

==== Philippines campaign ====
Following this duty, Ulvert M. Moore replenished her stores at Kossol Roads, Palaus, and got underway on New Year's Day 1945 as part of the screen for TG 77.4 -- the 14 escort aircraft carriers which would furnish close air support for the landing operations on Luzon and provide air cover for the fire support group, TG 77.2 -- bound for Luzon. Snooping Japanese planes showed up on the 3d, approached the formation, but kept just out of range. Ulvert M. Moore went to general quarters twice in the predawn hours of 4 January, fueled from USS Suamico, and spent the afternoon delivering mail via highline transfer to other ships in the task force. While she was casting off from alongside USS Minneapolis, her lookouts noted a Japanese plane slipping into the return flight pattern of the carriers. This kamikaze soon crashed into USS Ommaney Bay shortly after 1714, 1,000 yards (910 m) away from Ulvert M. Moore's starboard bow.

A heavy explosion rocked the "jeep carrier" from stem to stern, and large fires soon broke out along her starboard side. The destroyer escort headed for the scene at full speed and picked up four men—one of whom died before he could be brought aboard ship. All three suffered from flash burns and shock. Ommaney Bay continued to burn fiercely and eventually had to be sunk by a torpedo from USS Burns at 1845 that day. With bogies in the vicinity at 0039 on 5 January, Ulvert M. Moore went to general quarters and remained there until 0205. The destroyer escort went to general quarters three more times that day, twice for enemy aircraft and once for a contact which turned out to be friendly. At 1655, the destroyer escort received reports of approaching Japanese aircraft. Soon Japanese torpedo planes attacked the starboard side of the formation, giving Ulvert M. Moore a few moments before three "Oscar" fighters approached from port. Opening fire from 5,000 yards (4,600 m) with her 5-inch (130 mm) battery and from 3,000 yards (2,700 m) with her 40 mm Bofors guns, Ulvert M. Moore downed one "Oscar" which burst into flames and disintegrated.

Elsewhere in the immediate vicinity, Japanese planes crashed into the Australian heavy cruiser HMAS Australia and USS Stafford. The latter, holed on her starboard side aft, between the after engine room and fire room, initially seemed lost as fire broke out on board. Ulvert M. Moore closed to port and took off 54 men and 3 officers while USS Halligan nudged alongside to starboard and took off additional crewmen. Ulvert M. Moore received orders to stand by Stafford, along with Halligan and the fleet tug USS Quapaw which arrived to take the stricken destroyer escort in tow. Gunfire from Halligan and Ulvert M. Moore splashed a "Val" dive bomber early on the 6th, before USS Ralph Talbot (DD-390) relieved Halligan at 1849 on that day. Another Japanese plane ventured too close to the little formation on the 7th, and Ulvert M. Moore's gunners splashed it.

After transferring the crewmen of Stafford—who had been embarked in Ulvert M. Moore—to Ralph Talbot, the destroyer escort resumed antisubmarine patrols in the vicinity of Mindoro Island as part of Task Unit (TU) 77.4.1. While thus engaged, she received orders to assist USS La Vallette in searching for a Japanese submarine reported by a plane to be running on the surface in the vicinity. Accordingly, USS Goss accompanied Ulvert M. Moore and joined La Vallette and USS Jenkins (DD-447). At 1557 on 30 January, La Vallette made contact and dropped a depth charge barrage but observed no results and soon lost the contact. The group continued to search throughout the night with negative results.

On 31 January, Ulvert M. Moore secured from the search at 1607 and steamed to join up with TG 77.4. En route, the destroyer escort received a radio message from USS Boise telling of a surfaced submarine on a southeast bearing 8 nautical miles (15 km; 9.2 mi) away. USS Bell and USS O'Bannon left Boise's screen to investigate. Bell closed to 4 nautical miles (7.4 km; 4.6 mi) before the enemy submarine—identified by postwar accounting as the Japanese submarine Ro-115—submerged. At 2037, Ulvert M. Moore received orders to assist in the search and arrived at the scene to complete the hunter-killer group. The destroyer escort detected the submarine at 2152 but briefly lost the contact. Regaining the contact at 2210, she fired her first Hedgehog pattern four minutes later. At 2227, she fired another |Hedgehog pattern; and three explosions rumbled up from below—muffled noises intermingling with "crunching noises." Twice more, the destroyer escort attacked like a persistent terrier. Another pattern of 7.2-millimeter projectiles left the Hedgehog mount at 2302, hit the water and plunged downward; 12 seconds later a sharp "crack" followed, as did "distinct and definite bubbling and hissing noises." Men on the destroyer escort's fantail reported seeing a large bubble burst on the surface.

Ulvert M. Moore closed the vicinity of the strong contact at 2336 and again at midnight. The eighth attack proved to be the killer; for, 15 seconds after the Hedgehog projectiles hit the water, three violent explosions sent out concussions felt by topside personnel in Ulvert M. Moore and the three other ships. A last explosion rumbled up from below—the death agony of the Ro-boat and a "definite bluish light similar to burning gas" was noted. For two hours, the ships searched the vicinity to confirm the "kill". Men topside in Ulvert M. Moore noted the strong odor of diesel oil, an object which resembled a life jacket, small boxes and pieces of deck planking, and a considerable amount of paper.

==== Iwo Jima, Okinawa, and the end of the war ====
Ulvert M. Moore retired to Ulithi and remained there from 6 to 18 February before departing with other ships of CortRon 70 and Tulagi, as part of TU 50.7.3 to provide antisubmarine protection for the carriers which would furnish close air support for the forces attacking Iwo Jima. The ship thus began her most grueling period, as she steamed continuously for 78 days to support this operation and the subsequent one against Okinawa. The destroyer escort operated with Tulagi and, later, USS Anzio, southeast of Okinawa. During the Okinawa operation, President Roosevelt died on 12 April, a loss felt not only by the nation and the Fleet, but by his son Comdr. Roosevelt, Ulvert M. Moore's commanding officer.

Returning to Guam on 6 June, Ulvert M. Moore soon shifted to Ulithi for major repairs. On 19 June, the destroyer escort put to sea with TG 30.8, the group providing logistics support for Admiral William F. Halsey's air strikes against the Japanese home islands. She operated with this unit until returning to Guam on 24 July. Three days later, the ship joined the hunter-killer group based around USS Salamaua, in operating on antisubmarine patrol northeast of Luzon. Two atomic bombs—dropped on Hiroshima and Nagasaki on 6 and 9 August, respectively—hastened the collapse of Japanese resistance. At this time, Ulvert M. Moore was operating with Salamaua on antisubmarine patrol east of Formosa, a duty in which she remained engaged until putting into Leyte on 25 August.

Ulvert M. Moore screened TG 32.1, the supporting escorts for TF 32, then en route to Tokyo Bay for the Japanese surrender. On 2 September, the escort vessel entered Tokyo Bay, in the words of her ship's historian, as "a fitting culmination to approximately 14 months of strenuous operation." After conducting antisubmarine and mine patrol duties in Japanese home waters, escorting Japan-bound transports with occupation forces embarked, and destroying floating mines with light-caliber gunfire, Ulvert M. Moore operated in the Philippines into the winter before she returned via Pearl Harbor to the United States. Arriving at San Diego, California, on 22 November, the destroyer escort was decommissioned there on 24 May 1946 and placed in reserve.

=== Korean War ===
Ulvert M. Moore remained inactive until the onset of the Korean War in the summer of 1950. The destroyer escort was accordingly recommissioned at San Diego on 27 January 1951 and assigned to CortRon 9. After shakedown, she departed San Diego on 19 April, bound for the Far East. Arriving at Sasebo, Japan, on 17 May 1951, Ulvert M. Moore joined Task Force 72 for Formosa patrol duty, standing guard off Taiwan, to deter against possible communist Chinese incursions against the Nationalist Chinese. The destroyer escort was detached from this duty on 10 June and arrived at Buckner Bay two days later. She then conducted hunter-killer exercises as she steamed north to Japan.

Arriving at Yokosuka on 16 June, she departed there nine days later and headed for the west coast of Korea to join the British carrier HMS Glory for screen and patrol duty. In August, Ulvert M. Moore participated in bombardment and covering operations at Wonsan, Korea, during minesweeping operations there and came under fire for the first time from communist shore batteries. Her guns covered the retirement of the more lightly constructed minecraft and earned the ship a "well done." After conducting frequent patrols north to Songjin and Chongjin, Korea, for shore bombardment and anti-junk patrol, the destroyer escort put into Sasebo on 25 August for refit. The following month, Ulvert M. Moore continued her operations off the coast of Korea undertaking bombardment and call-fire missions in support of United Nations ground troops at Wonsan, Songjin, and Chongjin on the east coast of Korea. Near the end of the month, the ship proceeded towards Okinawa, conducting hunter-killer exercises en route.

However, Typhoon Ruth prevented successful completion of their evolution and forced Ulvert M. Moore and the other ships of CortRon 9 back towards Korea. Arriving off Hungnam on 14 October, the destroyer escort proceeded to her interdiction patrol station and watched for enemy junk traffic off the coast. Early on the morning of 17 October, communist shore batteries shelled the ship, lobbing a salvo close aboard the escort vessel. One shell hit the steering engine room, and fragments killed one man almost instantly. In addition, the splinters wounded an officer and an enlisted man. Efficient and rapid damage control work soon repaired the damage, allowing the ship to return to action. Ulvert M. Moore remained on the station—conducting shore bombardment, serving on antisubmarine patrol, and patrolling to locate and destroy enemy junks or mines—until she departed Korean waters on 6 November, arriving at San Diego, via Japan, on 26 November.

After an overhaul at the San Francisco Naval Shipyard and antisubmarine and air defense training off the coast of California, Ulvert M. Moore got underway for the Far East and her second tour off Korea, departing San Diego on 18 October 1952. Ulvert M. Moore subsequently took part in operations interdicting communist coastal rail traffic and harassing enemy logistics movements. She remained thus engaged until 19 December before conducting a period of hunter-killer exercises off Okinawa between 27 December 1952 and 9 January 1953. On 31 March, Ulvert M. Moore's commanding officer assumed duties as Commander Task Group (CTG) 95.3, to enforce Japanese and South Korean fishing rights off Korean coastlines, before she sailed for the west coast of the United States, making port at San Diego on 6 June 1953.

=== Postwar career ===
After conducting local operations, including antisubmarine, air defense, and type training evolutions, Ulvert M. Moore again sailed for the Far East, departing the west coast for Yokosuka on 20 May 1954. During this tour, the ship's duties consisted primarily of escorting fleet tankers and ammunition ships. In addition, she also participated in a marine landing exercise, a hunter-killer training operation, and conducted antisubmarine exercises with Colombian, British, and Dutch naval units. She weathered three major typhoons during the deployment: "Grace", while moored at Sasebo; "June", during a sortie with a typhoon-evasion task force from Tokyo Bay; and "Lorna", while at sea off the southeast coast of Japan. Upon completion of her tour, Ulvert M. Moore departed Yokosuka, bound for San Diego via Midway Island and Pearl Harbor. While en route home, she encountered a storm which battered her for 10 days and produced many heavy rolls in the storm-tossed seas.

Ulvert M. Moore subsequently conducted three more WestPac deployments into 1958. During one of these, in early 1958, she participated in Operation Skyhook. Placed out of commission, in reserve, on 10 October 1958 at Astoria, Oregon, the destroyer escort remained inactive until struck from the Navy List on 1 December 1965. She was authorized for destruction as a target vessel on 18 April 1966 and subsequently sunk off San Nicholas Isle on 13 July 1966 by aircraft from USS Coral Sea and by surface gunfire.

== Military awards ==
Ulvert M. Moore (DE-442) was awarded five battle stars for her World War II service and three for Korea.
