= USS William Seiverling =

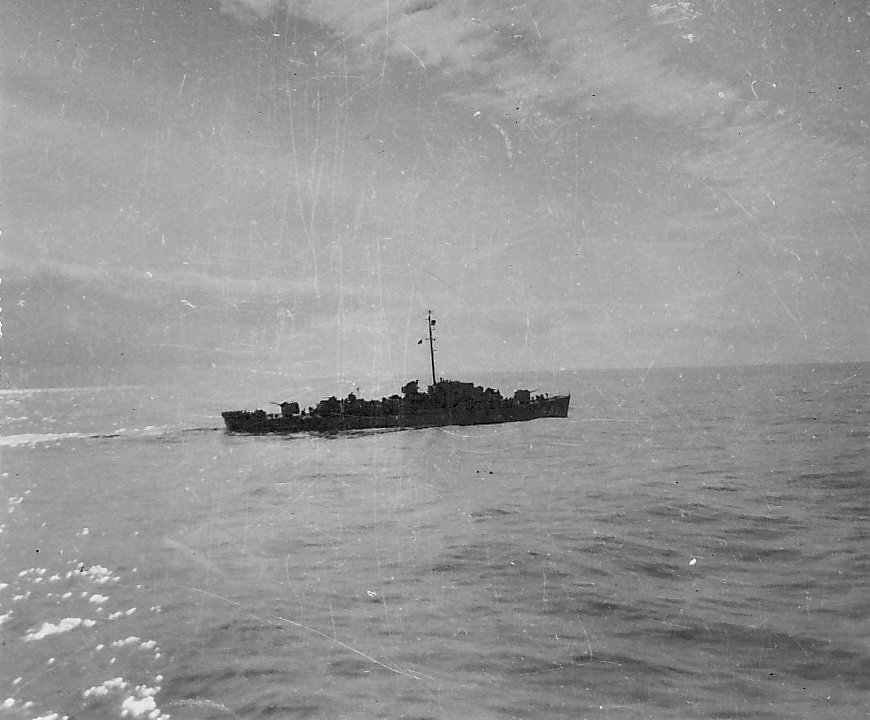
- William Seiverling underway, c. 1951

History

United States
- Laid down: 2 December 1943
- Launched: 7 March 1944
- Commissioned: 1 June 1944
- Decommissioned: 21 March 1947
- In service: 27 December 1950
- Out of service: 27 September 1957
- Stricken: 1 December 1972
- Fate: Sold for scrap 20 September 1973

General characteristics
- Displacement: 1,350 long tons (1,372 t)
- Length: 306 ft (93 m) (oa)
- Beam: 36 ft 10 in (11.23 m)
- Draught: 13 ft 4 in (4.06 m) (max)
- Propulsion: 2 boilers, 2 geared steam turbines, 12,000 shp, 2 screws
- Speed: 24 knots
- Range: 6,000 nmi at 12 knots
- Complement: 14 officers, 201 enlisted
- Armament: 2 × 5"/38 guns, 4 (2×2) 40 mm anti-aircraft (AA) guns, 10 × 20 mm AA guns, 3 × 21-inch (533 mm) torpedo tubes, 1 × Hedgehog, 8 × depth charge throwers, 2 × depth charge tracks

USS William Seiverling (DE-441) was a John C. Butler-class destroyer escort acquired by the United States Navy during World War II. The primary purpose of the destroyer escort was to escort and protect ships in convoy, in addition to other tasks as assigned, such as patrol or radar picket. Post-war she returned home bearing four battle stars; when she was reactivated for the Korean War, she returned home after that war with three more.

William Seiverling was named in honor of William Frank Seiverling Jr., who was awarded the Navy Cross posthumously for his actions on Guadalcanal.

William Seiverling was laid down on 2 December 1943 at Newark, New Jersey, by the Federal Shipbuilding and Drydock Company, launched on 7 March 1944; sponsored by Mrs. Grace Seiverling; and commissioned at the New York Navy Yard on 1 June 1944, Lt. Cmdr. Charles Francis Adams IV in command.

== Namesake ==
William Frank Seiverling Jr. was born on 22 September 1920 in Elizabethtown, Pennsylvania. He enlisted in the United States Marine Corps at Philadelphia, Pennsylvania, on 2 February 1942. Attached to the Marine Barracks, Parris Island, South Carolina, for basic training from 3 February to 12 March, he moved to New River, North Carolina, on the latter date and served there until 17 May 1942. He began service as a private on 19 June 1942 and was deployed to the Guadalcanal Campaign helping to wrest control of that island from the Japanese.

On 1 November 1942 during the Japanese attack across the Matanikau River Seiverling ran down the hill in the face of enemy fire, killing at least one sniper and perhaps several others. Later, he covered the evacuation of wounded Marines from his own platoon; and, after hearing that the 2nd Platoon was also in trouble, he ran between that unit and the enemy to cover his comrades' withdrawal. Once again, he killed several Japanese before he himself was hit by enemy machinegun fire. Though wounded, Seiverling continued to deliver fire into an enemy position with his automatic rifle. As he started back over the ridge to make his own retirement, he was fatally wounded. For his actions he was awarded the Navy Cross, posthumously.

== World War II Pacific Theatre operations ==
Following commissioning, William Seiverling conducted shakedown training in the vicinity of Bermuda. She returned to New York on 26 July and began post-shakedown availability at the New York Navy Yard. She completed repairs on 8 August and put to sea on the 9th, bound ultimately for the western Pacific. After several stops along the way, she transited the Panama Canal on 25 August. The warship remained at Balboa until the 30th, at which time she continued her voyage.

She stopped at San Diego, California, from 2 to 11 September before getting underway for Pearl Harbor on the latter date. The destroyer escort reached Oahu on 17 September and began a series of missions out of the Pearl Harbor base. For the remainder of September and during the first week in October, those operations consisted of torpedo, surface gunnery, and shore bombardment exercises. After 8 October, William Seiverling began antisubmarine warfare duty, first on a training basis and, after 1 November, as a unit of a hunter-killer force built around Corregidor. That employment continued until 24 November, when she sortied from Pearl Harbor in company with Task Group (TG) 12.4, a hunter-killer group built around Tulagi. That unit steamed via Eniwetok to Ulithi, where it arrived on 2 December.

== Antisubmarine operations ==
For the next three months, William Seiverling operated with the hunter-killer group from the base at Ulithi. She helped to patrol the sea lanes between various islands in the Central Pacific to keep them clear of Japanese submarines. On 28 December, the destroyer escort departed Ulithi in company with the Tulagi group to provide ASW support for the Lingayen landings scheduled for the beginning of the second week in January 1945. She and her unit stopped at Kossol Roads in the Palau Islands from 29 December 1944 until 1 January 1945.

On the latter day, she sortied with the task group and set a course—via the Surigao Strait, the Sulu Sea, and the South China Sea—for Luzon. During the transit, enemy air attacks were frequent, but William Seiverling never got into the action until she arrived off Lingayen Gulf on 7 January. On that day, her guns warded off a single attacker whose approach was quite desultory in nature. She patrolled the waters off Lingayen Gulf until 17 January at which time she joined the screen of task group TG 77.4 and TG 77.3 and headed south. She conducted patrols with elements of the two task groups until 1 February when she began retirement through the Sulu Sea with TG 77.4.

On 5 February, the warship reentered the lagoon at Ulithi. Upkeep occupied the next two weeks. On 19 February, the destroyer escort reported for duty with the U.S. 5th Fleet as an element of Task Unit (TU) 50.7.3. That same day, she departed Ulithi with that task unit and headed—via Guam—to the vicinity of Iwo Jima to support the battle then in progress for that island. For about a month, she and the other ships of the task unit conducted antisubmarine patrols of the sea lanes between the Marianas and Iwo Jima. On 11 March, she cleared the Iwo Jima area to return to her base at Ulithi where she arrived on 14 March.

== Okinawa operations ==
William Seiverling remained at Ulithi completing logistics until 21 March at which time she got underway with TG 52.1 to support the assault on and occupation of Okinawa. Her first mission in support of the Ryukyu campaign consisted of antisubmarine protection for escort carriers, the planes of which provided close air support for the troops assaulting Okinawa. That phase of her Okinawa service lasted until 15 April at which time she began another series of antisubmarine patrols along the route between Okinawa and Ulithi with TU 50.7.3, the reconstituted Tulagi hunter-killer group. Those patrols occupied her time until 30 April at which time she parted company with the unit to return to Ulithi for repairs to her main propulsion plant.

== Under air attack ==
The warship arrived back in the lagoon at Ulithi on the afternoon of 3 May and commenced repairs. She completed repairs on 15 May and stood out of the anchorage on the 16th to escort Genesee back to Okinawa. Upon arrival in the Ryūkyūs on 20 May, she began duty patrolling on various antisubmarine and antiaircraft defense stations around Okinawa. During that phase of her Okinawa duty, William Seiverling came under air attack on numerous occasions—including the 25 May attack when a suicider succeeded in crashing and sinking Bates and she claimed three kills and a number of hits but suffered no damage herself. On 28 May, the destroyer escort received orders to join the screen of TG 30.7 with which she conducted antisubmarine patrols about 400 miles north of Guam. On 5 June, her unit shaped a course via Guam to Ulithi where it arrived on 8 June.

== Philippine Islands operations ==
William Seiverling remained at Ulithi for about two weeks conducting repairs and provisioning. On 24 June, she departed the atoll and shaped a course for San Pedro Bay, Leyte, where she and her division mates joined TG 30.8 on 26 June. On the 28th, TG 30.8—with William Seiverling in company—departed Leyte to return to Ulithi. The task group reentered Ulithi on 30 June and commenced logistics operations in preparation for its logistics support missions to the U.S. 3rd Fleet carriers during the summer air strikes on the Japanese home islands. William Seiverling served in the screen of the U.S. 3rd Fleet replenishment group through most of July.

On 23 July, she returned to Ulithi for repairs to her sound gear and to take on stores and provisions. She returned to sea on 25 July and rendezvoused with Salamaua on the 28th. She conducted antisubmarine patrols with that escort carrier until 1 August at which time the task unit set a course for Leyte and temporary duty with the U.S. 7th Fleet. She and her unit mates arrived in San Pedro Bay on 5 August and remained there until 8 August when they resumed antisubmarine patrols to the northeast of Luzon. That duty occupied her time until the end of hostilities on 15 August and thereafter.

== End-of-war assignments ==
She continued patrols of that nature, operating from the base on Leyte near San Pedro Bay until 27 August at which time she set a course for Japan and duty in conjunction with the occupation. The warship arrived in Tokyo Bay on 2 September, the day Japan formally surrendered to the Allies. She supported the occupation forces in Japan until 17 October when she departed Yokosuka to escort a convoy of tank landing ships to Manila. She reached her destination on 25 October and remained there for repairs and provisions until 3 December.

On the latter day, the warship stood out of Manila Bay to return to the United States. After stops at Guam, Eniwetok, and Pearl Harbor, William Seiverling arrived in San Pedro, Los Angeles, on 26 November. The destroyer escort began preparations for inactivation almost immediately upon arrival. William Seiverling was placed in commission, in reserve, sometime in December. Though inactive, the warship remained in commission, in reserve, until formally decommissioned on 21 March 1947.

== Reactivation for Korean War ==
The outbreak of the Korean War during the summer of 1950 brought many warships in the reserve fleet back to active duty. Accordingly, on 27 December 1950, William Seiverling was recommissioned at San Diego, California, Lt. Comdr. Walter C. Cole in command. She spent the first three months of 1951 conducting shakedown training along the California coast. On 16 April, she departed San Diego in company with Escort Squadron (CortRon) 9, bound for the Far East. After stops at Pearl Harbor and Midway Island, she arrived in Sasebo, Japan, on 14 May. From there, she moved south to Keelung, Taiwan, where she joined the Taiwan Strait patrol.

=== Korean War operations ===
In July, the warship arrived in the Korean War zone. From the 6th to the 12th, she conducted shore bombardment missions near Songjin. When not engaged in shore bombardment, William Seiverling patrolled the North Korean coast as a unit of the United Nations Blockading Force. Early in September she joined the naval forces blockading Wonsan harbor.

=== Under fire from Korean shore batteries ===
On 8 September, while operating with minesweepers in the inner harbor at Wonsan, the destroyer escort drew fire from an enemy shore battery. She began maneuvering radically and opened counter battery fire. The enemy, however, proved far more accurate than did the American warship. Throughout the brief action, he consistently straddled William Seiverling and succeeded in scoring three hits, one of which struck the ship below the waterline at the number 2 fireroom. That hit caused William Seiverling to break off the action and retire to Sasebo for repairs. The warship remained at Sasebo for the remainder of that deployment. She returned to the United States on 22 November.

William Seiverling completed repairs and conducted normal operations along the California coast during the first 10 months of 1952. On 17 October 1952, she departed San Diego to return to the Far East. After stops at Pearl Harbor and at Midway Island, she arrived in the western Pacific at Yokosuka on 11 November. By 16 November, the destroyer escort was back on station with the Wonsan blockade. That duty—including shore bombardment missions—lasted until 26 December. After upkeep, she returned to the Korean coast on 5 January 1953. Her western Pacific deployment lasted until late May and included three more tours of duty in the coastal waters around Korea.

== Assigned to training duty ==
She departed the Far East on 22 May and reentered San Diego on 9 June. She resumed local operations until January 1954 at which time the warship entered the Long Beach Naval Shipyard for overhaul. She completed repairs on 26 March and resumed training duty out of San Diego for the next two months. On 20 May, William Seiverling stood out of San Diego on her way back to the Orient. The warship arrived in Japan on 8 June but was soon back in Korean waters participating in a landing exercise at Sokcho Ri. Between 29 June and 26 July, the ship made a series of goodwill visits to the Japanese ports of Kobe, Nagoya, Muroran, and Niigata. During the remainder of that deployment, she resumed duty with TF 95. Late in November, she completed her western Pacific assignment and set a course for San Diego. William Seiverling arrived back in her home port on 10 December 1954.

== The final years ==
The warship's active career lasted just a little over two more years. During that time, she made two more deployments to the western Pacific. During the first 7th Fleet assignment, she operated in the old familiar northwestern Pacific near Japan and Korea. Also during that deployment, she visited Maizuru, Japan, where, in June and July 1955, she took custody of lend-lease ships being returned to the United States. Her second and final deployment of that period took her to the southwestern Pacific for visits to New Zealand and Australian ports before she headed north for duty on the Taiwan Strait patrol. She returned to San Diego from the last tour of duty in the Far East on 18 February 1957. She resumed normal operations until 15 June at which time she began preparations for decommissioning.

== Final decommissioning ==
William Seiverling was placed out of commission at San Diego on 27 September 1957. She remained in the Pacific Reserve Fleet until 1 December 1972 when her name was struck from the Navy List. On 20 September 1973, she was sold to Levin Metals Corp., of San Jose, California, for scrapping.

== Awards ==
William Seiverling earned the following awards:

- Asiatic-Pacific Campaign Medal with four battle stars
- World War II Victory Medal
- Navy Occupation Medal
- National Defense Service Medal
- Korean Service Medal with three battle stars
- Philippine Liberation Medal
- United Nations Service Medal
