= USS Bagley (DD-386) =

Bagley-class destroyer

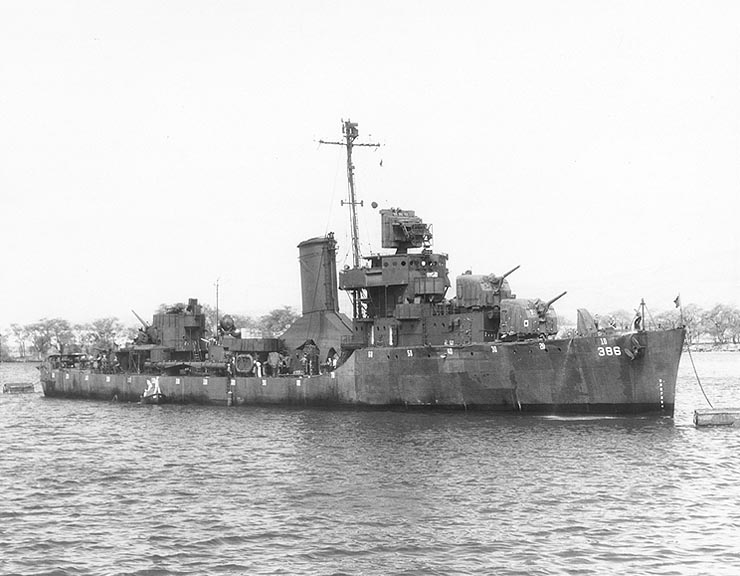
- Bagley at Pearl Harbor in late 1945. Note the trunking around the single stack that distinguished this class. The small numbers on her side denote the location of her hull frames.

History

United States
- Name: USS Bagley (DD-386)
- Namesake: Worth Bagley
- Builder: Norfolk Navy Yard
- Laid down: 31 July 1935
- Launched: 3 September 1936
- Commissioned: 12 June 1937
- Decommissioned: 14 June 1946
- Stricken: 25 February 1947
- Fate: Sold 3 October 1947

General characteristics
- Class & type: Bagley-class destroyer
- Displacement: 2,325 tons (full); 1,500 tons (light)
- Length: 341 ft 8 in (104.14 m)
- Beam: 35 ft 6 in (10.82 m)
- Draft: 10 ft 4 in (3.15 m) light; 12 ft 10 in (3.91 m) full
- Propulsion: two propellers, 49,000 shp
- Speed: 38.5 knots (71.3 km/h)
- Range: 6,500 nautical miles (12,000 km) at 12 knots (22 km/h)
- Complement: 251
- Armament: 4 × 5 in/38 cal guns (12 cm); 4 × .50 cal (12.7 mm) guns; 16 × 21 inch (533 mm) torpedo tubes; 2 × depth charge tracks

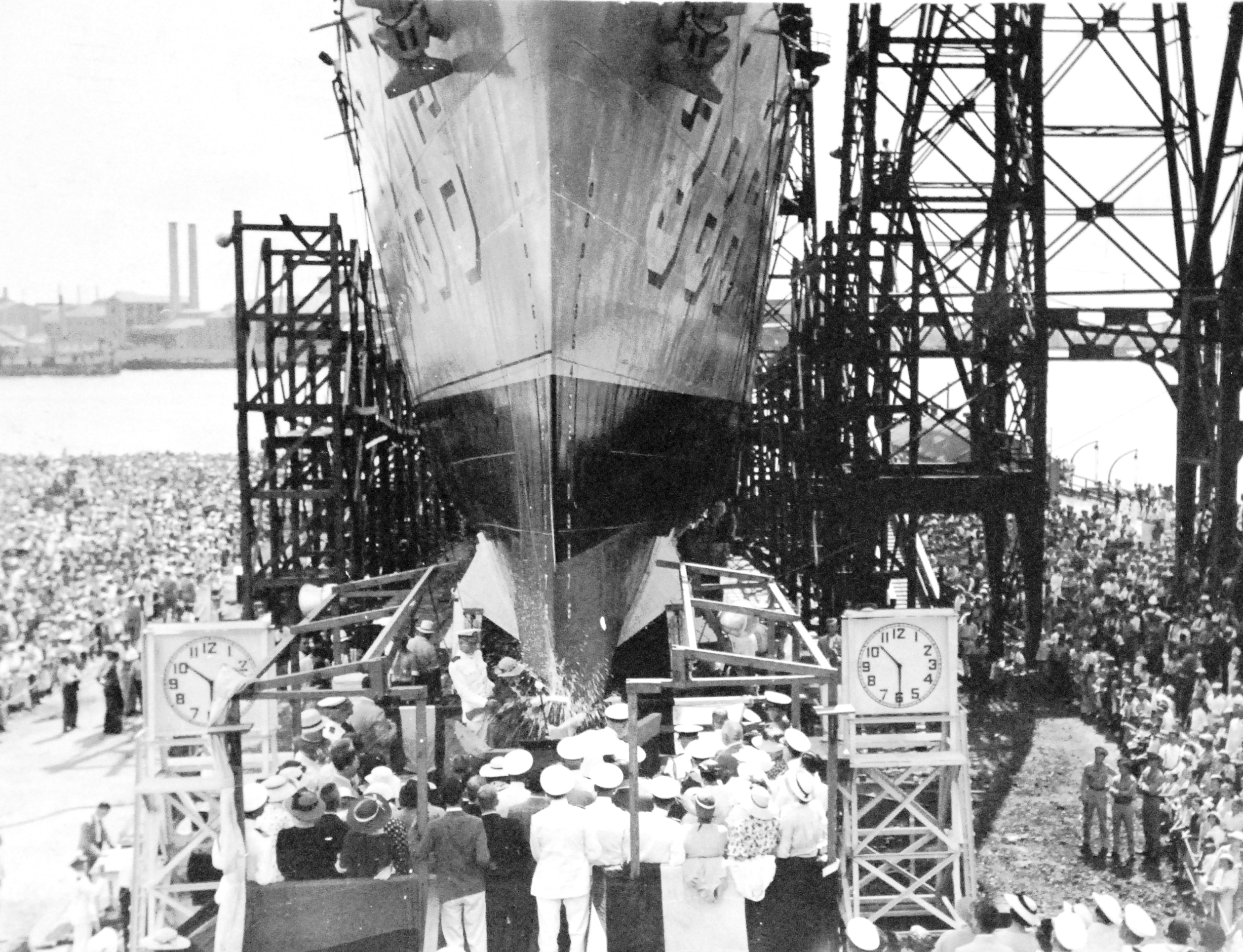
Launching of Bagley on 3 September 1936

USS Bagley (DD-386), a Bagley-class destroyer, was the third ship of the United States Navy to be named for Ensign Worth Bagley, officer during the Spanish–American War, distinguished as the only U.S. naval officer killed in action during that war.

Bagley (DD-386) was laid down on 31 July 1935 at the Norfolk Navy Yard, Portsmouth, Virginia; launched on 3 September 1936; sponsored by Miss Bella Worth Bagley, sister of Ensign Bagley; and commissioned on 12 June 1937.

== Service history ==
=== Inter-War Period ===
Bagley worked extensively in the Atlantic before being sent to Pearl Harbor in 1940. She rotated occasionally between there and the Californian coast. By December 1941, Bagley was operating locally out of Pearl Harbor. Frequent exercises with DesDiv 7 were interspersed with carrier task force evolutions centered around Enterprise and Lexington. The pace of these operations intensified as American economic sanctions, instituted in response to Japanese actions in China and French Indochina, provoked Japanese protests. On 3 December during an antiaircraft practice at sea with DesDiv 8, Bagley's starboard side bilge keel tore loose. The destroyer slowed to 10 knots (20 km/h) and changed course for Oahu, mooring at the Pearl Harbor Navy Yard the following morning. On 6 December, the warship shifted berths starboard side to berth B-22 in Southeast Loch. By this time, Bagley had gone cold iron, receiving electricity, steam, and fresh water from the dock.

=== World War II ===
==== Pearl Harbor ====
At 0755 on 7 December, shortly before morning colors, Japanese aircraft from six fleet carriers struck the Pacific Fleet as it lay in port at Pearl Harbor. Onboard Bagley, Radio Seaman Recruit Robert P. Coles from Machias, Maine exited the port side mess decks and saw the Japanese planes attacking Hickam Field. He loaded a deck gun and began firing on them. He was relieved by Chief Gunners Mate Skinner who, as noted in official records, fired at the third plane to attack.

The crew first saw dive bombers in action over nearby Hickam Field and then witnessed a Nakajima B5N "Kate" torpedo planes pass down Southeast Loch and torpedo Oklahoma moored off Ford Island. The destroyer immediately went to general quarters, firing her .50-caliber machine guns at the torpedo-carrying Nakajimas passing down the port side to attack the American battleships. Shortly after 0800, a second "Kate"'s torpedo exploded in the bank about thirty feet ahead of Bagley.

During the second phase of the attack, which began about 0840, Bagley's crew fired on Aichi D3A "Val" dive bombers attacking Ford Island and the navy yard dry docks. Her gunners claimed to have splashed at least six aircraft that morning; but, given the intensity of antiaircraft fire from all ships, her "kills" cannot be conclusively proven. At 0940, the warship headed for the channel and the open sea, leaving her commanding officer, executive officer, and gunnery officer ashore. Bagley, under the temporary command of Lieutenant Philip W. Cann, paused only long enough to pick up the skipper of destroyer Patterson, who was subsequently transferred to his own ship at sea.

==== 1942 ====
Bagley covered the arrival of TF 14 at Pearl Harbor four days after Christmas. The next day, the destroyer sailed with Saratoga to patrol west of Oahu, covering the islands while two carrier groups escorted reinforcements to Samoa. On 11 January 1942, however, a single torpedo from I-16 hit and damaged the aircraft carrier. Bagley returned to Pearl Harbor with the injured Saratoga and, taking advantage of the opportunity, underwent a restricted availability at the Pearl Harbor Navy Yard between 23 January and 3 February, adding four 20-millimeter machine guns to her antiaircraft battery.

Departing Oahu on the last day of January, Bagley joined TF 11, comprising Lexington, four cruisers and nine destroyers, to cover transports delivering reinforcements to Christmas Island, Canton Island in the Phoenix Islands, and New Caledonia. Worried about Japanese intentions in the Fiji-New Caledonia area, TF 11 joined the ANZAC cruiser force, Australia, HMNZS Achilles, HMNZS Leander with Chicago and two destroyers, on 16 February. Shortly thereafter, the task force turned to the northwest and headed for Bougainville in the Solomon Islands.

On 20 February, at 1707, the destroyer opened fire on a second wave of nine bombers with her 20-millimeter battery, joining the barrage of antiaircraft fire around Lexington. Minutes after that, one bomber attempted to crash Bagley's stern, but fire from Aylwin helped splash the "Betty" some 200 yards (200 m) distant on the starboard quarter.

Upkeep and repair, punctuated by a dry dock period, kept the destroyer's crew busy for the next month. Bagley took departure from Pearl Harbor on 30 April, carrying mail and passengers to Palmyra Island, Christmas Island, and the Society Islands. Off Bora Bora on 9 May, she rendezvoused with Hunter Liggett and escorted her to the Fiji Islands, arriving at Nukualofa Bay, Tongatapu, on 15 May. The destroyer then spent a week patrolling outside the harbor, protecting departing convoys from enemy submarines, before continuing on alone to Brisbane, Australia, arriving there on 30 May.

Assigned to the Southwest Pacific Force (TF 44), Bagley protected convoys in the approaches to Australia, searched for submarine contacts during two patrol sweeps with Henley, and conducted night battle practice and other exercises with the cruisers of TF 44 through mid-July. On the 17th, she departed Brisbane for New Zealand, arriving in Auckland on 20 July. There, she joined TF 62 and began preparations for Operation Watchtower, the invasion of Guadalcanal.

Bagley steamed to the Fiji Islands, in company with cruisers Chicago, Salt Lake City, Australia, HMAS Canberra, HMAS Hobart, eight other destroyers, and 12 transports. Joined by other convoy elements on the 26th, including three more cargo ships, Bagley guarded the transports as they conducted rehearsal landings at Koro Island. The task force then proceeded to the Solomon Islands, arriving in the transport area off Lunga Point, Guadalcanal, on 7 August.

Assigned to "Southern Force", one of three picket patrols, Bagley and Patterson accompanied Australia, Canberra, and Chicago in protecting the transports south of Tulagi.

Australia, with Rear Admiral Victor Alexander Charles Crutchley, RN, on board, left formation for a command conference at Lunga Roads at 2130. Just over two hours later, with visibility low owing to overcast sky and rain showers, unidentified ships loomed into view about 3,000 yards (3,000 m) distant on the port bow. These were seven Japanese cruisers and a destroyer under Rear Admiral Gunichi Mikawa sent from Rabaul to attack the American transports. At that moment, 0144 according to Bagley's log, float planes from the Japanese cruisers dropped flares that lit up the American warships.

Bagley turned sharply to the left to bring the starboard torpedo tubes to bear on the Japanese warships looming out of the darkness but, either due to the torpedoes not being armed in time or because the ship turned too quickly for the torpedo tubes to be aimed properly, she continued her turn and fired four torpedoes to the northwest from number two port mount. Although the torpedomen claimed hits a few minutes later, no Japanese ships were damaged by torpedoes in that area. It is possible, but unconfirmed, that one or two of Bagley's torpedoes may have hit Canberra on her starboard side. Bagley then turned left again and her gunners scanned the passage between Guadalcanal and Savo Island; but, as the Japanese cruiser force had already passed by to the north, they saw no enemy ships. She then steamed to the northwest, toward the designated destroyer rendezvous point, and at about 0300 came across the heavily damaged and burning Astoria. That warship, along with Quincy and Vincennes, had been mortally wounded in the short, but violent, Battle of Savo Island before the Japanese force retired to Rabaul.

Bagley came alongside Astoria and rescued about 400 survivors—including 185 wounded—from the stricken warship, out of the water or from nearby rafts. With daylight, Bagley delivered a salvage party of 325 men to Astoria to fight fires, plug holes and raise steam. The effort ultimately failed, and the cruiser sank that afternoon. Meanwhile, Bagley's medical officer and pharmacist's mates treated shell-fragment lacerations and second-degree burns before the wounded were transferred to President Jackson that afternoon. Bagley then withdrew to Nouméa with TF 62, mooring there on 13 August.

==== 1943 ====
On 15 March 1943, Bagley executed orders reassigning her to TF 74 as the newly created 7th Fleet readied itself for offensive operations in New Guinea. Underway from Townsville on 27 June, Bagley, in company with Henley and SC-749, escorted six LSTs carrying 2,600 Army troops and airfield equipment to Woodlark Island. While the destroyers patrolled south of the island, the landing proceeded without Japanese interference on the night of 30 June and 1 July. Bagley escorted three more echelons of LSTs from Townsville to Woodlark between 9 July and 7 August; all arrived safely, and the fighter airstrip became operational on 23 July. The destroyer then escorted Henry T. Allen between Milne Bay, Cairns, and Brisbane, arriving at the last port on 15 August.

Bagley steamed back to New Guinea late in the month, delivering a convoy to Milne Bay on 1 October. She quickly returned to Townsville to pick up another convoy, escorting it safely into Milne Bay on the 8th. Sailing again to Australia, this time to Brisbane, the destroyer shepherded a third convoy from Townsville to Milne Bay between 25 and 29 October. After moving to Buna on 8 November, Bagley helped escort a convoy of three LSTs to Finschhafen, delivering supplies to the Australian 20th Brigade on the 11th. Over the next four weeks, the destroyer escorted six more reinforcement convoys out of Buna; three to Finschhafen, one to Lae, one to Woodlark Island, and the last to Cape Cretin on 12 December.

After steaming to Buna on 23 December, Bagley joined the seven LSTs of TU 76.1.41, carrying the 7th echelon of 1st Marine Division's engineers, artillery, and stores for the Cape Gloucester operation. The crew watched the heavy cruisers bombard the beach at 0600 on 26 December, and then Bagley screened the LSTs as they landed troops and equipment. That afternoon, around 1430, a large Japanese air raid attacked the task force, sinking Brownson and damaging Shaw. Later that evening, Bagley's crew saw friendly fighters splash three "Betty" bombers over the beachhead. Returning to Buna on 28 December, Bagley then helped leapfrog elements of the 32nd Infantry Division to Saidor, New Guinea, bypassing a strong Japanese garrison at Sio. The third echelon convoy landed troops and equipment without incident on 2 January 1944.

==== 1944 ====
Ordered "to act as stand-by escort for supply echelons", the destroyer delivered a convoy of LSTs to Saidor on 5 February and the next day, in company with Smith and two LSTs, steamed for Cape Gloucester. She departed the region on 10 February, steaming east for the west coast of the United States.

Arriving in San Francisco on 27 February, after stops at Florida Island, Guadalcanal, Palmyra, and Pearl Harbor, Bagley entered the Mare Island Navy Yard for a major overhaul on the 28th. Over the next eight weeks, she added two more 20 mm guns (for a total of six) and an improved fire control radar while a twin 40 mm gun tub was placed forward of the two after 5-inch (127 mm) guns.

Underway for Hawaii on 5 May, Bagley began training at sea for Operation "Forager", the planned invasion of the Marianas. Arriving at Pearl Harbor on the 10th, the destroyer conducted screen, antiaircraft, and shore bombardment drills before sailing for the Marshall Islands on 29 May. Anchoring in Majuro Atoll on 3 June, Bagley joined one of the four fast carrier task groups, putting out to sea with Bunker Hill and TG 58.2 on the 8th.

===== Saipan =====
The destroyer then moved to the transport area on 15 June, screening the initial landings on Saipan before returning to the bombardment group on the 17th. From that screening position Bagley participated in the Battle of the Philippine Sea. Although primarily an air battle—later dubbed "The Great Marianas Turkey Shoot"—in which most of the several hundred Japanese plane casualties were lost to American fighters, several small groups of Japanese aircraft broke through the CAP. These were mostly driven off by intense antiaircraft fire from the battleships and destroyers. Bagley fired on three planes that day, lobbing 24 5 inch shells at a "Val" and a "Kate" at a range of 6,000 yards (5,000 m) astern and another 147 20 mm and 40 mm shells at a Zero that passed 1,000 yards (1,000 m) distant to starboard. In the following days, the destroyer continued to screen the battleships as they vainly chased the retreating Japanese.

On 25 June, the destroyer returned to the Marianas for two weeks of call-fire assignments in support of Marine Corps operations. Under the direction of fire control units ashore, Bagley fired over 700 5 inch rounds of high-explosive, white phosphorus, and starshell into the final pocket of Japanese resistance at the north end of Saipan. On 6 July, after receiving more ammunition from Montpelier, she closed shore and fired on "caves and crevasses near waters edge on Saipan", expending 537 5-inch and over 1,000 rounds of 20-millimeter and 40 mm shells.

Bagley screened Enterprise during the strikes on Okinawa and the smaller Ryukyus on 10 September. This was followed by a raid on Aparri in the Philippines on the 11th before the large-scale effort to destroy Japanese air power on Formosa began on 12th.

===== Leyte Gulf =====
Bagley's only part in the Battle for Leyte Gulf was to join the ad hoc cruiser-destroyer group dispatched in futile pursuit of the retreating flattops, mere decoys with only half their air component on board. With the Battle for Leyte Gulf over on 25 October, and the surviving Japanese naval forces in retreat, Bagley rejoined the carriers as they stood by to support ground operations on Leyte. In order to destroy Japanese aircraft staging into the central Philippines, TG 38.4 launched attacks on Luzon from its patrol area east of Leyte Gulf on 30 October.

Arriving at Ulthui 2 November, Bagley received four days of overhaul from tender Markab (AD-21). The destroyer then sailed on the 10th with TU 77.4.1, built around Hoggatt Bay and Tulagi, to provide air support for Leyte ground operations. Retiring to Seeadler Harbor on the 27th, the destroyer spent the next month training, or receiving repairs from Briareus, all in preparation for Operation Musketeer, the landings on Luzon, Philippine Islands. On 27 December, the destroyer got underway for the Palaus, arriving there on the 30th.

==== 1945 ====
The 12 escort carriers of TG 77.2 and 77.4, and their screen of 19 destroyers, including Bagley, sortied from Kossol Roads on 1 January 1945. The group entered Leyte Gulf on the 3rd and steamed on to the Mindanao Sea, heading for Lingayen Gulf to provide air support for amphibious operations. Late in the afternoon of the 4th, after a day of false alarms and "snooper" alerts, a single twin-engine Japanese kamikaze crashed into Ommaney Bay, setting off explosions and fires which destroyed that escort carrier.

The next day, after the force entered the South China Sea, four Japanese kamikaze raids attacked the American warships. Although the first two waves were driven off by CAP, Bagley's crew saw suicide planes from the third attack crash Columbia, Manila Bay, Australia, and Stafford, damaging the latter badly enough to force her retirement to Leyte. Bagley screened the escort carriers between 6 January, when they began flying ground-attack missions over the Lingayen beaches, and 13 January when the next kamikaze plane attacked the group. Just after 0900, an undetected plane surprised and crashed into Salamaua, causing extensive damage. Several more closed the formation at 0908, and one Nakajima Ki-43 "Oscar" made a run toward Bagley. All guns that could bear opened fire at 3,600 yards (3,300 m), and the plane splashed about 1,000 yards (1,000 m) out on the port beam. The next four days passed without any Japanese attacks, and the task group retired to Ulithi, arriving there on the 23rd. With Philippine operations well underway, Bagley was assigned to the next major amphibious operation, the landings planned for Iwo Jima in February.

On 21 February, after a mere six days to conduct repairs and replenish, the warship embarked upon the last major amphibious operation of the war, the invasion of Okinawa. In company with the escort carriers of TG 52.1, Bagley arrived off Okinawa Jima on 25 March. The destroyer screened Anzio during ground attack and support operations into April without incident. Over the next several weeks, numerous small Japanese air raids appeared on her radar screen, but only one closed the formation, an ineffective attack by a lone plane on the 12th. On 28 April, while the escort carriers launched raids on Sakishima Gunto, the crew spotted an Ohka kamikaze pass harmlessly overhead at 26,000 feet (7,900 m).

On 24 May, after Bagley "blew out" her number one main generator, she turned toward the Philippines. Arriving in Leyte Gulf on the 27th after 102 days underway at sea, the destroyer went alongside Markab for repairs.

The warship's last combat operation began on 15 June when the destroyer departed Leyte for Kerama Retto. She rendezvoused with the six escort carriers of TG 32.1 on the 18th and supported them during a series of air strikes on Okinawa. A week later, however, Bagley's main battery director failed, and she once again retired to Leyte for repairs. After mooring there on 27 June, she went alongside Yosemite for three days of availability. As the tender was unable to repair the director, the warship steamed to Saipan on 5 July and thence on to Guam, arriving in Apra harbor on the 6th.

With a new director installed by 14 July, Bagley sailed to Saipan on the 15th. Departing the Marianas on 6 August, the warship escorted a convoy of merchant ships to Okinawa on 12 August. Three days later, her crew heard of the Japanese capitulation while shepherding a return convoy back to Saipan. Following 10 days of rest and recreation, Bagley embarked Rear Admiral Francis E. M. Whiting and staff for transport to Marcus Island. She arrived there on 31 August, and Japanese Rear Admiral Matsubara Masata surrendered the island and its garrison to Rear Admiral Whiting on board Bagley.

Returning to Saipan on 2 September, the destroyer then reported to the Commander, 5th Fleet, for extended duty. After a brief stop at Buckner Bay, Okinawa, the destroyer sailed for Japan, arriving in Sasebo on 20 September. Bagley spent the next five weeks operating as a minefield marker ship, assisting minesweeping efforts, and providing courier services between Sasebo, Nagasaki, and Wakayama. Several officers also inspected various Japanese naval vessels in port to determine compliance with Allied surrender terms.

=== Fate ===
The destroyer departed Sasebo on 29 October for the United States and, steaming via Pearl Harbor, arrived in San Diego on 19 November. Originally marked for use in experimental testing, probably the two-detonation series of atomic tests held in the summer of 1946 at Bikini Atoll (see Operation Crossroads) in the central Pacific, Bagley steamed to Pearl Harbor in late April 1946. The destroyer did not participate in the atomic tests, however, but instead reported for inactivation at Pearl Harbor on 2 May. Decommissioned there on 13 June 1946, she was towed to San Diego for scrap sale. Her name was struck from the Naval Vessel Register on 25 February 1947, and she was sold to the Moore Dry Dock Company, Oakland, California, on 8 September 1947.

== Awards ==
Bagley earned 12 battle stars for World War II service.

== Books ==
- Frank, Richard B. (1990). Guadalcanal: The Definitive Account of the Landmark Battle. New York: Penguin Group. ISBN 0-14-016561-4.
- Loxton, Bruce; Coulthard-Clark, Chris (1997). The Shame of Savo: Anatomy of a Naval Disaster. Australia: Allen & Unwin Pty Ltd. ISBN 1-86448-286-9.
- Morison, Samuel Eliot (1958). The Struggle for Guadalcanal, August 1942 – February 1943, vol. 5 of History of United States Naval Operations in World War II. Boston: Little, Brown and Company. ISBN 0-316-58305-7.
