= USS Salamaua =

Casablanca-class escort carrier of the US Navy

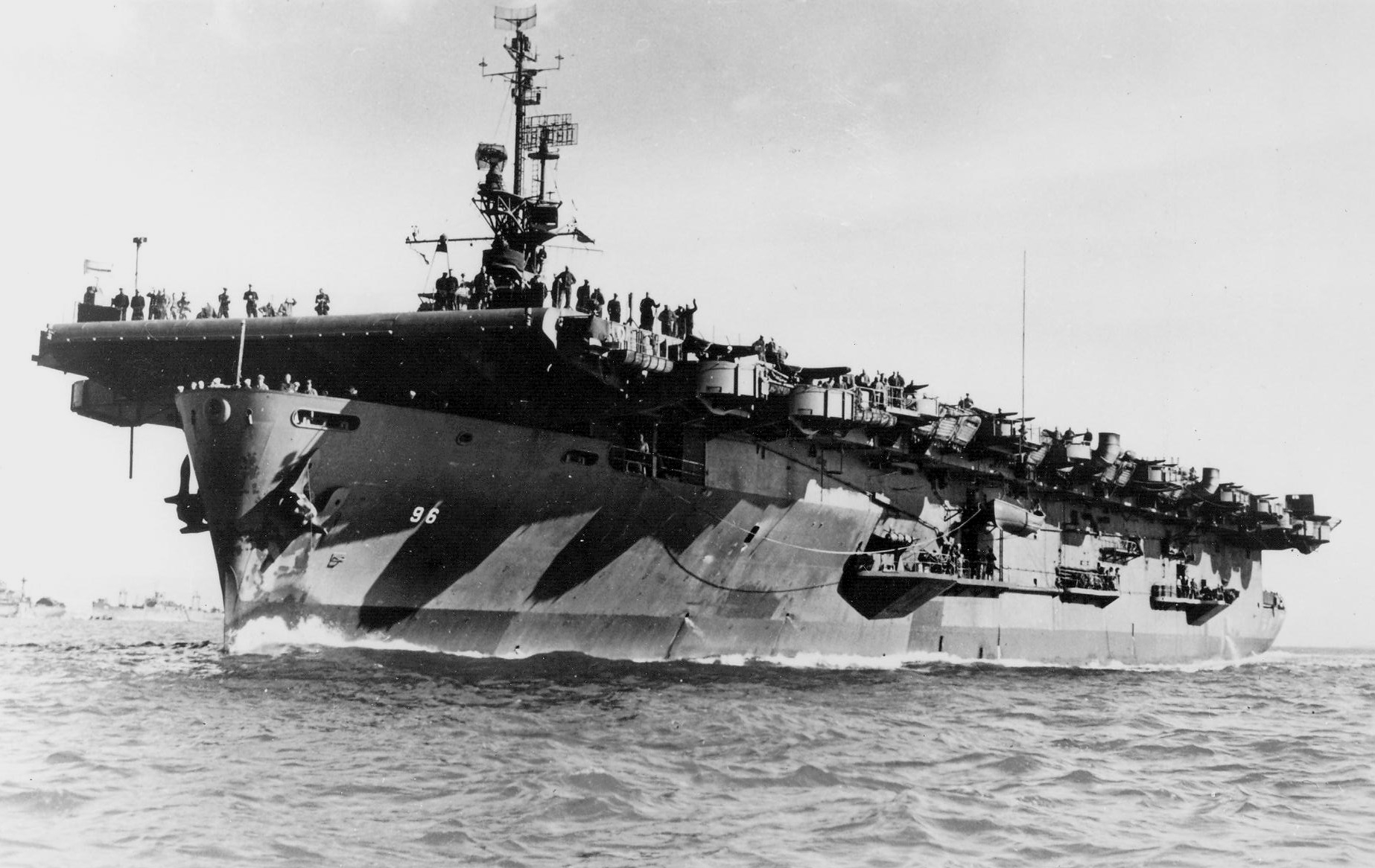
- USS Salamaua off San Francisco, 1945

History

United States
- Name: Anguilla Bay; Salamaua
- Namesake: Invasion of Salamaua–Lae
- Ordered: as a Type S4-S2-BB3 hull, MCE hull 1133
- Awarded: 18 June 1942
- Builder: Kaiser Shipyards
- Laid down: 4 February 1944
- Launched: 22 April 1944
- Commissioned: 26 May 1944
- Decommissioned: 9 May 1946
- Stricken: 21 May 1946
- Identification: Hull symbol: CVE-96
- Honors and awards: 3 Battle stars
- Fate: Sold for scrap on 18 November 1946

General characteristics
- Class & type: Casablanca-class escort carrier
- Displacement: 8,188 long tons (8,319 t) (standard); 10,902 long tons (11,077 t) (full load)
- Length: 512 ft 3 in (156.13 m) (oa); 490 ft (150 m) (wl); 474 ft (144 m) (fd)
- Beam: 65 ft 2 in (19.86 m); 108 ft (33 m) (extreme width)
- Draft: 20 ft 9 in (6.32 m) (max)
- Installed power: 4 × Babcock & Wilcox boilers; 9,000 shp (6,700 kW)
- Propulsion: 2 × Skinner Unaflow reciprocating steam engines; 2 × screws
- Speed: 19 knots (35 km/h; 22 mph)
- Range: 10,240 nmi (18,960 km; 11,780 mi) at 15 kn (28 km/h; 17 mph)
- Complement: Total: 910 – 916 officers and men; Embarked Squadron: 50 – 56; Ship's Crew: 860
- Armament: As designed: 1 × 5 in (127 mm)/38 cal dual-purpose gun; 4 × twin 40 mm (1.57 in) Bofors anti-aircraft guns; 12 × 20 mm (0.79 in) Oerlikon anti-aircraft cannons; Varied, ultimate armament: 1 × 5 in (127 mm)/38 cal dual-purpose gun; 8 × twin 40 mm (1.57 in) Bofors anti-aircraft guns; 20 × 20 mm (0.79 in) Oerlikon anti-aircraft cannons
- Aircraft carried: 27
- Aviation facilities: 1 × catapult; 2 × elevators

Service record
- Part of: United States Pacific Fleet (1944–1946)
- Operations: Invasion of Lingayen Gulf; Battle of Okinawa; Operation Magic Carpet

USS Salamaua (CVE-96) was a Casablanca-class escort carrier of the United States Navy. She was named after the invasion of Salamaua, a strategically important village in the New Guinea Theater during World War II, and one of the main targets of the Salamaua–Lae campaign. She served with distinction during the war, notably being damaged in early 1945 by a kamikaze aircraft during the Invasion of Lingayen Gulf, killing 15 crewmen and injuring 88. Post war, the ship helped repatriate servicemen to the United States as part of Operation Magic Carpet before being decommissioned and struck in 1946, and ultimately being broken up in 1947.

== Design and description ==
A side profile of the design of Thetis Bay.

Salamaua was a Casablanca-class escort carrier, the most numerous type of aircraft carriers ever built. Built to stem heavy losses during the Battle of the Atlantic, they came into service in late 1943, by which time the U-boat threat was already in retreat. Although some did see service in the Atlantic, the majority were utilized in the Pacific, ferrying aircraft, providing logistics support, and conducting close air support for the island-hopping campaigns. The Casablanca-class carriers were built on the standardized Type S4-S2-BB3 hull, a lengthened variant of the Doyen-class hull, and specifically designed to be mass-produced using welded prefabricated sections. This allowed them to be produced at unprecedented speeds: the final ship of her class, Munda, was delivered to the Navy just 101 days after the laying of her keel.

Salamaua was 512 ft 3 in (156.13 m) long overall (490 ft (150 m) at the waterline), had a beam of 65 ft 2 in (19.86 m), and a draft of 20 ft 9 in (6.32 m). She displaced 8,188 long tons (8,319 t) standard, which increased to 10,902 long tons (11,077 t) with a full load. To carry out flight operations, the ship had a 257 ft (78 m) hangar deck and a 474 ft (144 m) flight deck. Her compact size necessitated the installation of an aircraft catapult at her bow, and there were two aircraft elevators to facilitate movement of aircraft between the flight and hangar deck: one each fore and aft.

She was powered by four Babcock & Wilcox Express D boilers that raised 285 psi (1,970 kPa) of steam at 577 °F (303 °C). The steam generated by these boilers fed two Skinner Unaflow reciprocating steam engines, delivering 9,000 hp (6,700 kW) to two propeller shafts. This allowed her to reach speeds of 19 kn (35 km/h; 22 mph), with a cruising range of 10,240 nmi (18,960 km; 11,780 mi) at 15 kn (28 km/h; 17 mph). For armament, one 5 in (127 mm)/38 caliber dual-purpose gun was mounted on the stern. Additional anti-aircraft defense was provided by eight Bofors 40 mm (1.57 in) anti-aircraft guns in single mounts and twelve Oerlikon 20 mm (0.79 in) cannons mounted around the perimeter of the deck. By 1945, Casablanca-class carriers had been modified to carry twenty Oerlikon cannons and sixteen Bofors guns; the doubling of the latter was accomplished by putting them into twin mounts. Sensors onboard consisted of a SG surface-search radar and a SK air-search radar.

Although Casablanca-class escort carriers were intended to function with a crew of 860 and an embarked squadron of 50 to 56, the exigencies of wartime often necessitated the inflation of the crew count. They were designed to operate with 27 aircraft, but the hangar deck could accommodate much more during transport or training missions.

During the Invasion of Lingayen Gulf, Salamaua carried 14 FM-2 fighters and 10 TBM-3 torpedo bombers, for a total of 24 aircraft. However, during Salamaua's anti-submarine sweeps in the closing stages of the war, she carried 18 FM-2 fighters, 2 FM-2P variant fighters, and 12 TBM-3E variant torpedo bombers, for a total of 32 aircraft. While she was transporting aircraft in a non-combat role, she could accommodate up to 50 aircraft, provided her flight deck was also used for storage.

== Construction ==
The escort carrier was laid down on 4 February 1944, under a Maritime Commission contract, MC hull 1133, by Kaiser Shipbuilding Company, Vancouver, Washington. When she was ordered in 1942, she was expected to possess the name Anguilla Bay, as part of the US Navy's policy of naming escort carriers after bays and sounds. On 6 November 1943, before she was laid down, she was renamed to Salamaua, as part of a new policy which named escort carriers after sites of naval or land engagements. She was launched on 22 April 1944; sponsored by Mrs. W. J. Mullins; transferred to the United States Navy and commissioned on 26 May 1944, Captain Joseph Irwin Taylor, Jr in command, and with a partial complement of 54 officers and 518 enlisted men.

== Service history ==
Following her commission, she proceeded through the Strait of Juan de Fuca on 17 June 1944, taking on armaments and conducting tests at Naval Station Bremerton from 18 June to 22 June. On 22 June, she arrived at Seattle, Washington, where she took on a load of damaged aircraft, bound for San Diego. As she proceeded down the West Coast, she underwent shakedown, pausing at the naval supply depot in Oakland. She arrived at San Diego, on 29 June, where she unloaded her aircraft. She then conducted drills off the coast of Baja California, for four days, returning to San Diego, on 4 July, where she took on an aircraft contingent and cargo. Salamaua left San Diego, on 6 July, arriving at Pearl Harbor, on 12 July, where she unloaded her wares for the next four days. She left Pearl Harbor, on 16 July, arriving at Naval Air Station Alameda, on 22 July, where she took on 50 aircraft and 300 passengers, bound for Finschhafen, New Guinea.

Salamaua departed Alameda, California, on the morning of 24 July, passing south of Hawaii, on 29 July, arriving at Finschhafen, on 12 August, where she took on a load of nonfunctional aircraft. She departed New Guinea, on 14 August, stopping at Palikulo Bay, to take on fuel. On 1 September, she returned to Alameda, where she underwent overhaul and conducted training exercises. She departed on 3 September, transporting cargo to San Diego, where she arrived on 4 September. On 26 September, she received her combat aircraft contingent (VC-87) at Naval Base San Diego. On 30 September, she left San Diego with USS Thornton (DD-270) to conduct flight exercises, returning on 7 October.

On 16 October, she once again sailed west from San Diego, as part of Task Unit 19.15.1, under the command of Rear Admiral Calvin T. Durgin, along with her fellow sister ships Makin Island, Lunga Point, and Bismarck Sea. She paused at Pearl Harbor on 23 October, and arrived at Ulithi on 5 November. A tropical disturbance delayed departure until 10 November, when she set off for Leyte Gulf, pausing at Kossol Roads, to replenish fuel. She departed on 13 November, and from 14 November to 23 November, she furnished air screening for convoys in the Leyte Gulf area, without major incident. On 23 November, a Mitsubishi G4M bomber managed to get through the screen, strafing the carriers without much ill effect before being shot down. She then proceeded to the Admiralty Islands, to prepare for the invasion of Luzon, as part of Carrier Division 29, under the command of Rear Admiral Durgin. En route, the destroyers Patterson and Bagley detected a potential submarine on 26 November, and dropped depth charges. She, along with her task group, arrived at Seeadler Harbor on 27 November. She stayed at anchor until 16 December, when she left to engage in training exercises at Huon Gulf. On 21 December, she returned to Seeadler Harbor, to make final preparations for the planned invasion of Lingayen Gulf.

=== Lingayen Gulf ===
She departed Seeadler Harbor, on the afternoon of 27 December, and moved north to a massive escort carrier formation at Kossol Roads, on 30 December. On 1 January 1945, the task group left for Luzon, passing Leyte, on 3 January. The following day, 4 January 1945, her task group was engaged by kamikazes. On the afternoon of 4 January 1945, she was transiting the Sulu Sea, to the west of the Philippines. At 17:00, approximately 15 Japanese planes were picked up on radar, 45 mi (72 km) west of the task group, and approaching quickly. These planes split into two groups, one group heading towards the rear of the task group, whilst the other continued on its course towards the center. Although fighters from the carrier group were scrambled, false radar signals hampered their efforts to intercept, resulting in the shooting down of just one Japanese plane. During the early stages of the attack, one kamikaze made for Salamaua, but it was discouraged by heavy anti-aircraft fire, changing course instead to make for Lunga Point before being shot down. Later that day, she witnessed the sinking of Ommaney Bay, which was scuttled following a devastating kamikaze strike.

On 5 January, her task group was harried by more kamikazes, and two planes were shot down by Salamaua's anti-aircraft gunners. The kamikazes did succeed in damaging the cruiser Louisville, however. On 6 January, she arrived off the entrance to Lingayen Gulf. Her planes began blasting enemy positions ashore and providing air cover for the approaching Allied ships. On 9 January, they provided air cover for the troops landing on the assault beaches, then continued that support until 13 January, when she was forced to retire.

In the days prior to 13 January, fueling operations for the task group had been underway, which was complicated significantly by rough seas which snapped hoses. On 13 January 1945, the task group relocated 80 mi (130 km) to the west of Lingayen Gulf, where fueling recommenced. At 09:00 in the morning, Salamaua was scheduled to be refueled by an oiler. The task group had launched combat air patrols to screen the carriers, with one group of aircraft at 3.7 mi (6.0 km) and another at 1.3 mi (2.1 km). However, visibility was limited due to heavy cloud cover, hovering 1.5 mi (2.4 km) above the ground, and there was no indication of enemy activity in the area.

At 08:58, a Japanese kamikaze plane, emerging from cloud cover, unexpectedly dove almost vertically towards Salamaua's flight deck. The speed of its descent, as well as the task group being on low alert, meant that the kamikaze was able to carry out its attack unmolested by anti-aircraft fire. Carrying two 551-pound (250 kg) bombs, it penetrated deep into the lower decks, leaving a 16-foot (4.9 m) by 32-foot (9.8 m) gaping hole in the flight deck and lighting a fire in the lower bulkheads that caused a pillar of smoke to rise from the hole. Admiral Durgin, querying Salamaua as to the origin of the smoke, received a reply that "Something just went through our flight deck". One of the bombs detonated near the tank tops, just above the bilge, narrowly missing the bomb stowage compartment. The blast sent debris from the engine and fuselage rocketing onto the flight deck, collapsing a number of bulkheads. Additionally, it sparked multiple fires throughout the flight deck, hangar deck, and engine room. Inside the hangar deck, aircraft were being readied for a strike, and the existence of armed munitions made the situation tenuous. The second bomb failed to explode, and was ejected through the starboard side of the ship at the waterline, near the engine, leaving a hole about 20-inch (51 cm) wide through which seawater rushed in. There was immediate loss of power, communications, and steering throughout the ship. The aft engine room was breached and flooded, rendering the starboard engine inoperational, albeit the flooding extinguished the engine room blaze.

Several fires were kindled, but most of the blazes were quickly put under control, with the exception of a major fire within the hangar deck, which was fed by gasoline saturated debris from the flight deck. Fighting the fire was further complicated by the loss of water main pressure along the aft of the ship, and by the detonation of hydrostatic fuses and various other ammunition. After 30 minutes, the blaze was contained, after a fight which first belayed, then prevented the detonation of more munitions. A more pressing concern was flooding, which an entire day of pumping could not alleviate. This resulted in the entire starboard engine being submerged, leading to the ship acquiring an 8° list to the starboard. The attack on Salamaua was the last successful kamikaze attack in the Philippines Campaign.

There were more kamikazes which followed up in the 10 minutes after the attack on Salamaua, but the Japanese had lost the element of surprise. One plane dove towards Tulagi, but was engaged by heavy anti-aircraft fire, including from Salamaua, and it veered towards Hoggatt Bay before being destroyed by a proximity-fuzed 5-inch shell. Another two planes tried to strike Salamaua, one passing above her port quarter before crashing into the sea, and another one detonating in midair as it approached her astern. Throughout this ordeal, she was able to keep up with her task group using her port engine. Fifteen men were killed, and 88 injured by the attack. At 19:25, she broke away from her task group to limp away for Leyte, accompanied by the destroyers Gridley and Ralph Talbot, along with the tug Apache.

=== Okinawa ===
Salamaua limped into Leyte, still hampered significantly by flooding, on 14 January. There, injured were unloaded, the worst of the wreckage was cleaned up, and flooding was partially controlled. After repairs, she set off for Seeadler Harbor, arriving on 2 February, for repairs on floating dry dock, where her aircraft contingent and crew were disembarked. On 5 February, she left for Pearl Harbor, accompanied by Kitkun Bay, also damaged by a kamikaze. She arrived on 17 February, where she unloaded unnecessary ammunition, and departed on 19 February, bound for San Francisco.

Arriving on 26 February, she was put in a queue for repairs. Repairs began on 3 March, and on 21 April, she moved west again. She arrived back at Pearl Harbor on 27 April, and received her new aircraft contingent (VC-70). She then conducted training exercises, in conjunction with Spearfish. She concluded her exercises and returned on 4 May, and set off for Guam, on 10 May, arriving on 20 May. At Guam, she received orders to join Task Group 52.2.1., which was supporting operations on the Ryukyu Islands. She rendezvoused with the task group on 26 May, to support land operations on Okinawa, but on 3 June, she was ordered to join Task Group 30.8, a logistics support group, alongside Attu, Windham Bay, and Bougainville.

=== Typhoon and anti-submarine operations ===
She arrived at her post on 4 June, but the next day, Typhoon Connie passed directly over the Third Fleet. On the morning of 5 June, the task group was refueling, but the weather deteriorated to render it impossible by noon. Reports of a typhoon to the south led Captain Joseph I. Taylor to order as many aircraft as possible to be sheltered within the hangar bay. Her limited carrying capabilities forced some aircraft to be stored on the flight deck, where they were bolted down onto the tarmac. By late afternoon, the task group was being buffeted by tropical storm force winds, and at 3:30, 5 June, hurricane force winds were reported. Steering control was lost by 3:35, as massive waves pounded the ship. A fore 40–mm gun and the aircraft handling boom was carted away by the waves. The flight deck was partially detached at the extreme fore, damaging the aircraft catapult and some bulkheads. On the flight deck, an Avenger tore loose from its restraints, spinning wildly across, wrecking all of the aircraft anchored onto the flight deck and killing a crewman. By the time the task force emerged from the typhoon, 46 planes had been destroyed, mostly on Salamaua and Bougainville. Salamaua's flight deck had been rendered inoperative, and she arrived at Guam, on 10 June, to undergo repairs.

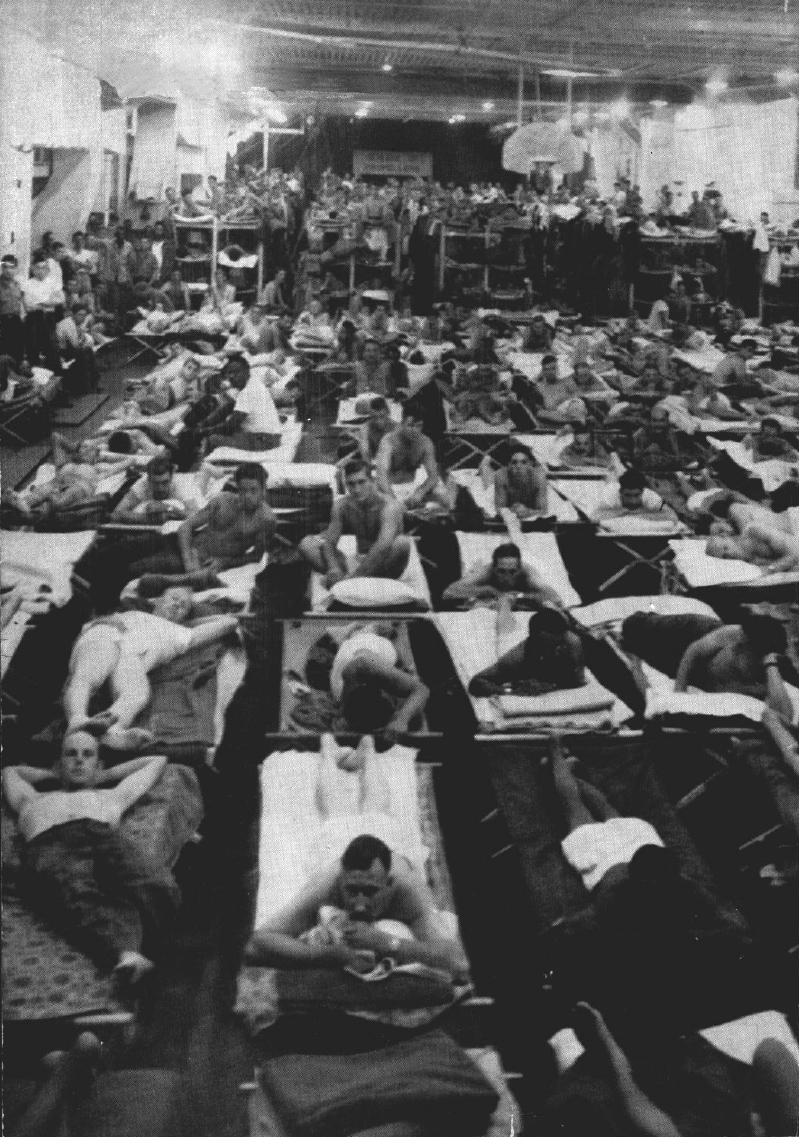
The view within the hangar deck of Salamaua during an Operation Magic Carpet run.

Repairs were hastily made at Guam, and she arrived at Ulithi, on 18 July. On 21 July, she was assigned anti-submarine patrol duty as part of the newly formed Task Group 94.17, along with the destroyer escorts William Seiverling, Ulvert M. Moore, Kendall C. Campbell, and Goss. Their objective was to protect the Marianas-Okinawa convoy lanes. On 31 July, she shifted to the Leyte-Okinawa lanes, as a reaction to the sinking of the destroyer escort Underhill and the cruiser Indianapolis by Japanese submarines. On 5 August, Captain Joseph I. Taylor relinquished command of Salamaua, being replaced by Captain John Hook Griffin. She undertook anti-submarine duties until the Japanese surrender on 15 August. Task Group 94.17 cleared naval mines, and achieved the likely destruction of two Japanese midget submarines, along with the possible destruction of another midget submarine.

=== Post-war ===
On 25 August, Salamaua returned to Leyte, replenished, then escorted a troop convoy on 27 August, containing the U.S. Eighth Army to Tokyo Bay. The convoy arrived on 2 September, and the escort carrier's planes photographed the landing of the occupation troops at Yokohama, during the formal Japanese surrender aboard the battleship Missouri. After guarding a second convoy into Tokyo Bay, she joined the "Magic Carpet" fleet, which embarked veterans for transport to the United States. She disembarked her first cargo of veterans at Alameda, on 3 October. Before the end of the year, Salamaua completed two more "Magic Carpet" runs.

In 1946, she was prepared for inactivation. She was decommissioned on 9 May 1946, struck from the Naval Vessel Register on 21 May, and subsequently sold to the Zidell Ship Dismantling Company, Portland, Oregon, for scrapping on 18 November 1946. Her hull was broken up sometime in 1947.

== Sources ==
=== Online sources ===
- "Salamaua (CVE-96)". Dictionary of American Naval Fighting Ships. Naval History and Heritage Command. 27 April 2016. Archived from the original on 22 November 2017.
- "Historical Narrative of USS Salamaua (CVE-96)". www.ibiblio.org.
- "Task Force 94, Marianas Area: Detailed Order of Battle, August 1945". www.alternatewars.com.
- "World Aircraft Carriers List: US Escort Carriers, S4 Hulls". Hazegray.org. 14 December 1998. Archived from the original on 19 November 2021.

=== Bibliography ===
- Adcock, Al (1996), Escort Carriers in Action - Warships No. 9, Carrollton, Texas: Squadron/Signal Publications, ISBN 9780897473569
- Chesneau, Robert; Gardiner, Robert (1980), Conway's All the World's Fighting Ships 1922–1946, London, England: Naval Institute Press, ISBN 9780870219139
- Friedman, Norman (1983), U.S. Aircraft Carriers: An Illustrated Design History, Annapolis, Maryland: Naval Institute Press, ISBN 9780870217395
- Rielly, Robin (2010), Kamikaze Attacks of World War II: A Complete History of Japanese Suicide Strikes on American Ships, by Aircraft and Other Means, Jefferson, North Carolina: McFarland & Company, ISBN 9780786457724
- Ross, Al (1993), The Escort Carrier Gambier Bay, Anatomy of the Ship, London, England: Conway Maritime Press, ISBN 9781557502353
- Smith, Peter (2014). Kamikaze: To Die for the Emperor. Barnsley, England: Pen and Sword Books. ISBN 9781473847828.
- Y'Blood, William (2012), The Little Giants: U.S. Escort Carriers Against Japan, Annapolis, Maryland: Naval Institute Press, ISBN 9781612512471
