= USS Patterson (DD-392) =

Bagley-class destroyer of the United States Navy

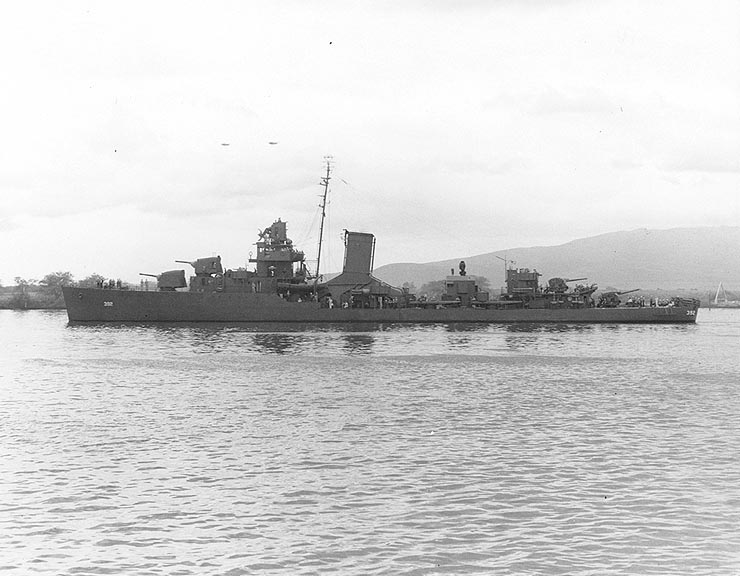
- USS Patterson (DD-392)

History

United States
- Namesake: Daniel Todd Patterson
- Builder: Puget Sound Navy Yard
- Laid down: 23 July 1935
- Launched: 6 May 1937
- Commissioned: 22 September 1937
- Decommissioned: 8 November 1945
- Stricken: 25 February 1947
- Fate: Sold 18 August 1947 and broken up for scrap.

General characteristics
- Class & type: Bagley-class destroyer
- Displacement: 2,325 tons (full), 1,500 tons (light)
- Length: 341 ft 8 in (104.14 m)
- Beam: 35 ft 6 in (10.82 m)
- Draft: 12 ft 10 in (3.91 m) full, 10 ft 4 in (3.15 m) light
- Propulsion: 49,000 shp; 2 propellers
- Speed: 38.5 knots (71.3 km/h)
- Range: 6,500 nautical miles (12,000 kilometres); @ 12 kn (22 km/h)
- Complement: 158
- Armament: 4 × 5"/38 caliber gun (12 cm), 4 × .50 cal (12.7 mm) guns, 12 × 21 in. torpedo tubes, 2 × depth charge tracks

USS Patterson (DD-392), a Bagley-class destroyer, was the second ship of the United States Navy to be named for Daniel Todd Patterson, an officer of the US Navy who served in the Quasi-War with France, First Barbary War, and the War of 1812.

== Construction and commissioning ==
Patterson was laid down 23 July 1935 by the Puget Sound Navy Yard, Bremerton, Washington; launched 6 May 1937; sponsored by Miss Elizabeth P. Patterson; and commissioned 22 September 1937.

== Service history ==
=== Pre-war ===
Patterson departed Puget Sound Navy Yard 26 November 1937, calling at San Francisco en route to Pearl Harbor, arriving 7 December. She returned to Puget Sound 22 December, trained in coastal waters until 31 March 1938, then cruised to Hawaii. She arrived at San Pedro from Hawaii 28 April for operations along the western seaboard and combined fleet maneuvers that once took her through the Panama Canal and into the Caribbean Sea. On 3 June 1940 she set course to patrol in the Hawaiian Sea Frontier area from Pearl Harbor to Midway and Palmyra. This duty continued for the next 18 months except for periods on the west coast for overhaul and training.

=== World War II ===
==== Pearl Harbor ====
Patterson was moored at Pearl Harbor when the Japanese carrier-based planes attacked on 7 December 1941. Her gunners sped to battle stations, opened fire, and blasted one Japanese plane out of the sky. Within an hour, the destroyermen were searching for possible Japanese submarines off the harbor entrance.

Patterson patrolled the Hawaiian Sea Frontier in the screen of aircraft carrier Saratoga without finding trace of the Japanese. On 28 December, returning from patrol, she rescued 19 survivors of merchant ship Marimi adrift for several days after having been torpedoed by a Japanese submarine.

==== 1942 ====
In the following weeks, her duties included convoy of reinforcements for the garrison on Canton Island, Phoenix Group, and hasty voyage repairs at Pearl Harbor. She departed 5 February 1942 bound in the screen of cruiser Pensacola for rendezvous with the Lexington carrier task group in the southwest Pacific. She rescued a Lexington pilot as air strikes were launched on the Japanese stronghold at Rabaul, New Britain, 20 February. The carriers rained devastation on the Japanese bases at Lae and Salamaua, New Guinea, 10 March, then proceeded to Pearl Harbor.

Patterson sailed from Pearl Harbor 7 April for overhaul in the Mare Island Naval Shipyard. She returned to Pearl Harbor 17 May and was underway five days later, en route by way of Nouméa, New Caledonia, to join Admiral Richmond K. Turner's Expeditionary Task Force preparing in Australia for the invasion of the Solomons. On 22 June she got underway from Brisbane for final staging and amphibious warfare rehearsals in the Fiji Islands, then set course in the screen of attack transports carrying Marines to the Solomon Islands.

===== Guadalcanal =====
Patterson helped guard attack transports 7 August as they landed Marines on Guadalcanal, later opening fire to help repel more than twenty attacking horizontal bombers. Several enemy planes fell in flames. Then Japanese torpedo planes came in and hit destroyer USS Mugford (DD-389). On 8 August Patterson gunners shot down four enemy torpedo planes while protecting the transports, but destroyer USS Jarvis (DD-393) was damaged and transport USS George F. Elliott (AP-13) was lost.

As Patterson fought off aerial raiders, seven enemy cruisers and a destroyer raced down the slot of water formed by the Solomon Islands Chain and stretching southward from the Japanese base at Rabaul. By midnight of 8 August, the Japanese task force was only 35 miles (56 km) from Savo Island, having been undetected since early morning.

===== Battle of Savo Island =====
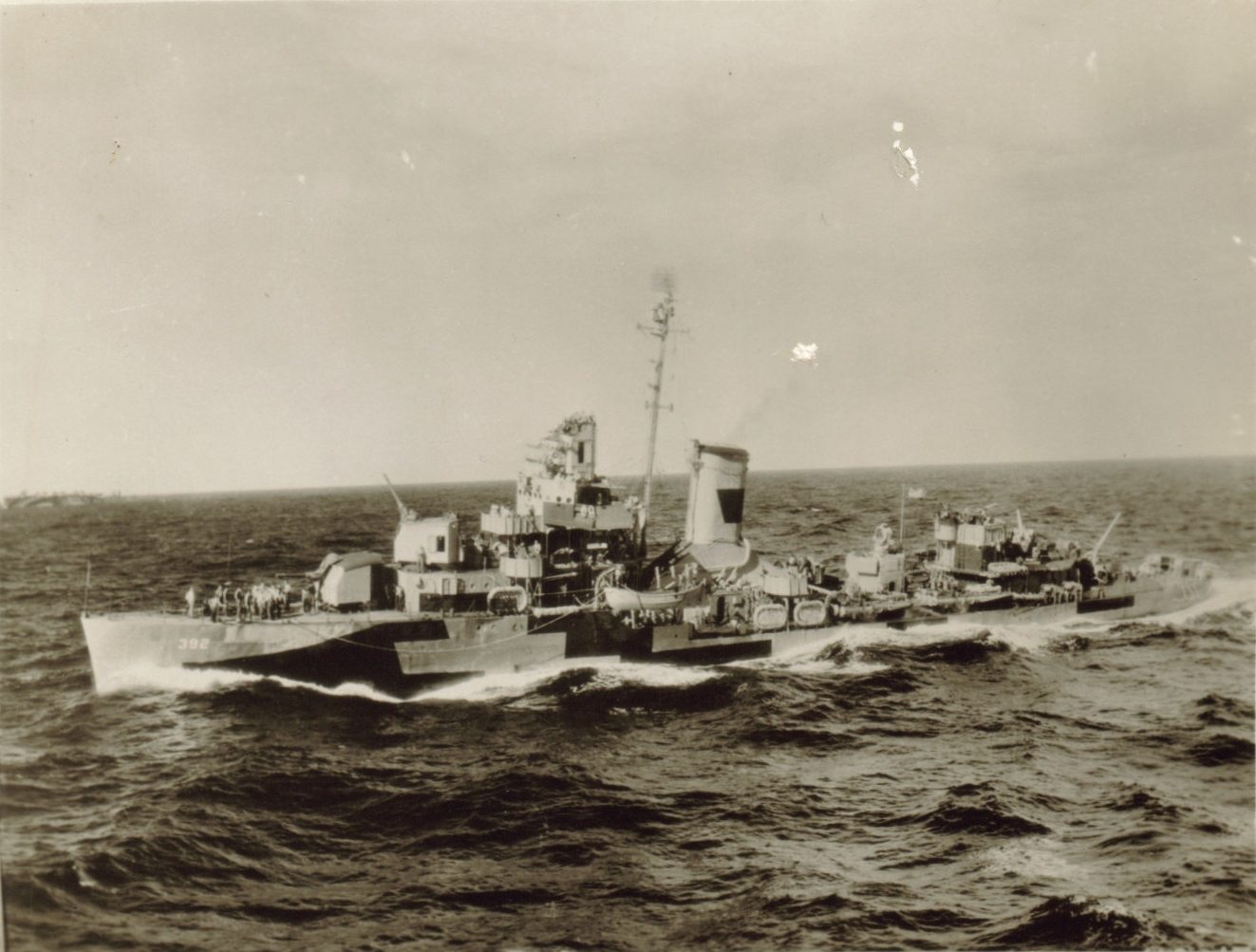
Patterson at sea

Patterson was south of Savo Island and Florida Island, with a US-Australian group of three heavy cruisers and two destroyers. To their north were the heavy cruisers USS Astoria, USS Vincennes, USS Quincy and two destroyers. Driving rain slashed the waters between the northern force and ships of the southern force.

The Japanese task force slipped past two picket destroyers, entered Savo Sound, and ran head-on into Patterson, whose patrol task group included the Allied southern group, composed of the heavy cruisers HMAS Canberra and USS Chicago, and the destroyer Bagley. At 0143, 9 August, Patterson radioed the alarm: "Warning! Warning! Strange ships entering the harbor!" But Japanese cruisers had already launched torpedoes and opened gunfire, disabling Canberra.

Patterson repeated her warning by blinker and opened up her guns. She received a 5-inch return salvo from the enemy that knocked out her Number 4 gun, killed 10 men, injured eight others, and damaged the deck and the Number 3 gun.

Patterson’s gunners continued shooting until the enemy, flinging torpedoes, split formation, and raced northeast in a pincer movement on the northern force of three cruisers. Cruisers Vincennes, Astoria and Quincy were lost. The Japanese now sped northward for return to Rabaul, New Britain, catching destroyer Ralph Talbot in her path. Ralph Talbot fought off the attack until she took cover in a rain-squall. The Japanese suffered only minor damage to four warships in the Battle of Savo Island that cost the Allies four cruisers, and severely damaged cruiser Chicago and destroyer Ralph Talbot.

Patterson assisted HMAS Canberra and took part in rescue work before proceeding to Nouméa, New Caledonia, arriving 14 August. Patterson immediately put to sea with the Saratoga carrier task group to help guard the approaches to Guadalcanal, until a Japanese submarine damaged Saratoga, and she returned to Pearl Harbor. Patterson helped guard HMAS Australia to Brisbane, arriving 3 September. She performed patrol and escort duty off the Great Barrier Reef with an Australian-American force of cruisers and destroyers.

==== 1943 ====
She rescued 19 survivors of the torpedoed SS Fingal 5 May 1943, then escorted merchantman SS Pennant to Nouméa, New Caledonia, She arrived 13 May to patrol approaches to Guadalcanal in the screen of carriers Saratoga and HMS Victorious. This duty was followed by innumerable convoy escort and patrol missions ranging from Guadalcanal south to Australian ports, and to the South Pacific island bases in the New Hebrides Islands and Nouméa, New Caledonia. The morning of 25 July, she joined four other destroyers in bombarding Lambeti Plantation, near the Munda air strip on New Georgia Island.

The evening of 25 August Patterson was helping guard a convoy bound from the New Hebrides Islands toward the lower Solomons. A warning pip on her radar screen brought her into action against a diving Japanese submarine. Her sonar picked up the underwater enemy, and depth charge patterns exploded in the sea. Patterson sent her last depth charge barrage on its way, and five minutes later she was rewarded by a deep underseas boom, presumably silencing the enemy. This differs from other sources which state that the I-25 was sunk less than a year later by one or more of the destroyers USS Ellet, USS Patterson, USS Taylor which were involved in the naval engagement on 3 September 1943 off the New Hebrides islands approximately 150 miles (240 km) northeast of Espiritu Santo. Which American ship sank the I-25 remains unknown.

Patterson next escorted troop transports from Nouméa, New Caledonia, to the New Hebrides, patrolled off Guadalcanal out of Purvis Bay, Florida, Solomon Islands. The night of 24 September she helped guard an amphibious landing convoy to Vella Lavella Island, then departed to escort high-speed transports to Rendova Island. She soon turned back to Vella Lavella Island at full speed, having received word that unloading tank landing craft there were under enemy air attack. The attack had ceased by the time she reached the scene, but she launched motor whaleboats with medical and rescue parties to aid the wounded.

The night of 29/30 September Patterson proceeded up the slot to destroy enemy barge traffic. Destroyer McCalla, after ripping into radar contacts with gunfire, attempted to rejoin the destroyer task unit formation, but suffered a steering casualty and unavoidably collided into the port bow of Patterson. Three men in Patterson were killed and ten injured by the force of the collision that almost severed Patterson’s bow. The broken section parted as she slowly proceeded towards base, breaking off just forward of gun mount No. 1. Both ships entered Purvis Bay for emergency repairs, thence to Espiritu Santo, New Hebrides Islands, where Patterson received a false bow. On 3 December she put to sea, touching the Samoan and Hawaiian Islands en route to the Mare Island Naval Shipyard, arriving 22 December.

==== 1944 ====
Patterson stood out of San Francisco Bay 8 March 1944 with a convoy that entered Pearl Harbor 15 March. Training with fast attack carriers in Hawaiian waters was followed by similar battle rehearsals out of Marshall Island ports in preparation for the Marianas Campaign. On 6 June Patterson departed Majuro Atoll en route to Saipan with the Bunker Hill Carrier Task Group. She joined in the preinvasion bombardment of Saipan, then guarded troop transports sending in assault troops for the initial invasion of Saipan 15 June. On approach of the Japanese Mobile Fleet, she became a unit of the anti-aircraft screen around the Fast Carrier Task Force whose pilots shot down hundreds of Japanese carrier-based planes, in a series of actions known as the "Great Marianas Turkey Shoot," before they could reach the American Fleet.

The few enemy planes that managed to get past the American carrier pilots met curtains of anti-aircraft fire from Patterson and her sister ships. The destroyer helped guard American attack carriers through 21 June as they pursued the fleeing Japanese fleet, decisively defeated in the Battle of the Philippine Sea, then turned back to help protect the approaches to Saipan. She provided night illumination fire for advancing troops on Saipan, then bombarded enemy targets on nearby Tinian Island.

Bombardment support and anti-submarine patrol continued off Saipan and Tinian until 9 August. Patterson then called briefly at Apra Harbor, Guam, en route to Eniwetok Atoll in the Marshalls. There, she joined the screen of fast carriers that struck hard at enemy bases on Iwo Jima and in the Western Caroline Islands. She participated in the bombardment of Yap Island 8 September. From there she proceeded to the Palau Islands to guard fast carriers giving direct support to the landing troops there until 9 October.

After replenishment at Manus, Admiralty Islands, Patterson made a high-speed run with attack carriers to blast enemy defenses on Okinawa and the entire Kerama Retto chain. From there the fast carrier task forces approached the Philippines to rain destruction on enemy air installations in Northern Luzon, thence proceeded to the coast of Formosa for air strikes launched 12 October. That evening and through the following day, Patterson helped fight off and destroy enemy aerial raiders that approached her carrier task group.

From Formosa, the carriers sped back to Luzon where Patterson helped drive off attacking enemy dive bombers that made a near miss on carrier Franklin. On 20 October her carrier task group gave direct air support to troops landing at Leyte to begin the liberation of the Philippine Islands. As the Japanese Fleet approached the Philippines in a three-pronged attack, 24–25 October, her carrier task force hit hard at the Japanese Southern Force of battleships, cruisers, and destroyers, struck at the even more powerful Japanese Central Force aiming at the Central Philippines, then raced north to destroy the Japanese decoy carrier task force in the Battle off Cape Enganno, 25 October. She joined in the pursuit of enemy fleet units fleeing the Battle for Leyte Gulf, then helped fight off the suicide attacks of Japanese kamikaze aircraft 30 October. She rescued men blown into the water from the damaged carriers Franklin and Belleau Wood, escorting the damaged carriers safely to Ulithi in the Caroline Islands, arriving 3 November.

Patterson helped protect attack carriers providing air cover to convoys approaching the Philippines until 9 December. She then proceeded independently to Kossol Roads, Palau Islands. There, she joined the screen of an escort carrier-bombardment task group that sailed 10 December to provide heavy gunfire support and air cover for the initial landings on Mindoro Island. For seven days the destroyer remained in the Sulu Sea, fighting off frequent suicide attacks of enemy aerial raiders that closed her carrier task group formation. There was a brief replenishment at Palau before Patterson again sailed with escort aircraft carriers, this time to support the invasion landings at Lingayen Gulf, Luzon, Philippines.

==== 1945 ====
She rescued survivors of the kamikaze-damaged escort carrier Ommaney Bay 4 January 1945, and survivors of destroyer Stafford and escort carrier Manila Bay the following day. She shot down a suicide plane diving on carrier Salamaua 13 January, remaining on guard for carriers in support of the Lingayen Gulf invasion landings until the 17th. She then proceeded to Ulithi in the Carolines to prepare for the impending invasion of Iwo Jima.

Patterson departed Ulithi 10 February for final battle rehearsals and staging in the Marianas, thence in the screen of escort carriers covering the amphibious expeditionary troops for the landings on Iwo Jima, 19 February. She rescued 106 survivors of the escort carrier Bismarck Sea, sunk by enemy torpedo plane attacks off Iwo Jima 21 February. The fighting destroyer remained off Iwo Jima with escort carriers until 10 March, then set course for Ulithi to prepare for the capture and occupation of Okinawa, the "last stepping stone" to Japan.

Patterson sailed from Ulithi the morning of 21 March, en route with a support unit of seven escort aircraft carriers that gave direct cover to troops storming ashore at Okinawa 1 April. She shot down an enemy suicide plane that attacked escort carrier Lunga Point 2 April and continued to guard the escort carriers as they pounded enemy troop concentrations and installations through 29 April. When her sonar gear became inoperative 29 April, she set course for repairs at Apra Harbor, Guam. She put to sea from Apra Harbor 4 June, escorting battleship New Mexico as far as Leyte in the Philippines, There she joined a troop and supply reinforcement convoy bound to Kerama Retto. By 12 June she had rejoined the escort carriers giving direct support to troops until the bitter contest for Okinawa was won.

Patterson returned to Leyte for repairs then headed for Saipan, Mariana Islands. This was her base for escort-patrol missions reaching to Okinawa, Guam, and towards the Marshalls until the close of hostilities with Japan.

=== Post-war ===
On 16 August she departed Saipan as escort for battleship New Jersey bound to Manila, thence to Buckner Bay, Okinawa. She departed Buckner Bay 8 September, touching Saipan, Eniwetok, and Pearl Harbor, en route to San Diego, California, arriving 26 September. The following day she got underway to transit the Panama Canal for the eastern seaboard. She arrived in the New York Naval Shipyard 11 October 1945.

== Decommissioning and disposal ==
Patterson decommissioned at the New York Naval Shipyard on 8 November 1945. She remained in reserve until her name was struck from the Naval Vessel Register 25 February 1947. She was sold for scrapping 18 August 1947 to the Northern Metals Company of Philadelphia, Pennsylvania.

== Honors and awards ==
Patterson received 13 battle stars for World War II service.
