= USS Stafford =

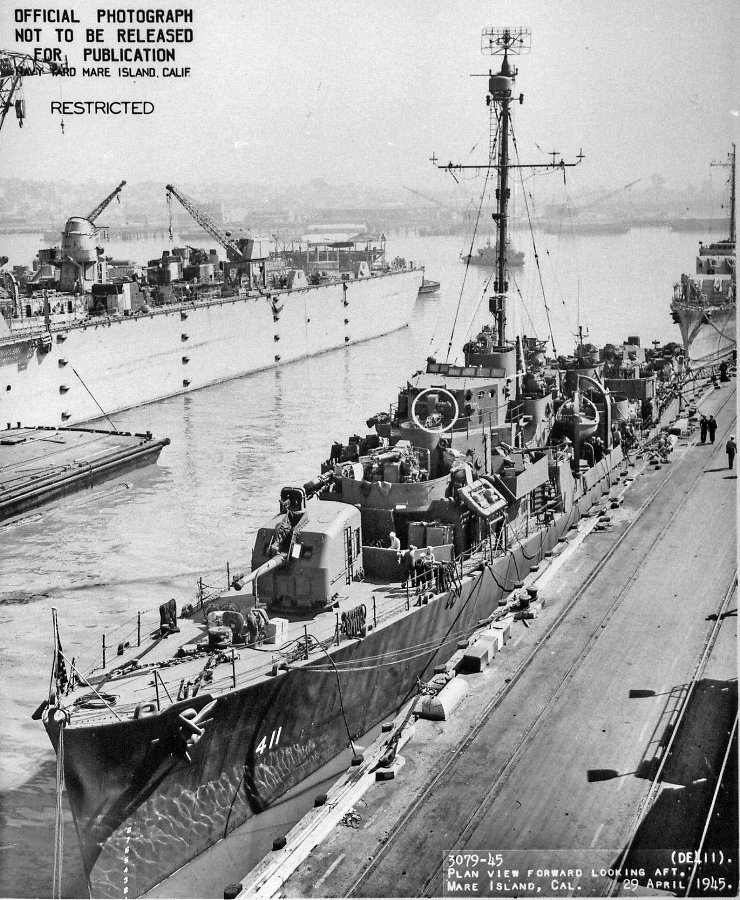
- USS Stafford docked on 29 April 1945

History

United States
- Name: Stafford
- Namesake: Richard Y. Stafford
- Builder: Brown Shipbuilding, Houston, Texas
- Laid down: 29 November 1943
- Launched: 11 January 1944
- Commissioned: 19 April 1944
- Decommissioned: 16 May 1946
- Stricken: 15 March 1972
- Fate: Sold for scrapping, 13 June 1973

General characteristics
- Class & type: John C. Butler-class destroyer escort
- Displacement: 1,350 long tons (1,372 t)
- Length: 306 ft (93 m)
- Beam: 36 ft 8 in (11.18 m)
- Draft: 9 ft 5 in (2.87 m)
- Propulsion: 2 boilers, 2 geared turbine engines, 12,000 shp (8,900 kW); 2 propellers
- Speed: 24 knots (44 km/h)
- Range: 6,000 nautical miles (11,000 km) at 12 knots (22 km/h)
- Complement: 14 officers, 201 enlisted
- Armament: 2 × single 5 in (127 mm) guns; 2 × twin 40 mm (1.6 in) AA guns; 10 × single 20 mm (0.79 in) AA guns; 1 × triple 21 in (533 mm) torpedo tubes; 8 × depth charge throwers; 1 × Hedgehog ASW mortar; 2 × depth charge racks

USS Stafford (DE-411) was a John C. Butler-class destroyer escort in the United States Navy. She was named after Richard Y. Stafford (1916–1942), a United States Marine Corps Captain who died during the Battle of Guadalcanal.

Stafford's keel was laid down on 29 November 1943 at Houston, Texas, by Brown Shipbuilding. The ship was launched on 11 January 1944, sponsored by Miss Flora Stafford; and commissioned on 19 April 1944.

== History ==
Upon completion of fitting out in the Galveston-Houston area, Stafford sailed in company with La Prade on 7 May for Bermuda for shakedown training. Her shakedown cruise was interrupted from 17 to 19 May, when she rendezvoused with convoy GUS-38 and escorted Merrimack into Bermuda. She completed training and post-shakedown availability early in June and, on 9 June, joined Italian submarine Vortice off Bermuda to escort that Italian submarine north. Three days later, at the entrance to Casco Bay, Maine, USS YMS-169 relieved Stafford of her charge, and the destroyer escort stood into Boston Harbor and moored at Charlestown, Massachusetts. She underwent post-shakedown overhaul at the Boston Navy Yard from 13 to 22 June. The next day, she headed south and moored at Norfolk, Virginia, two days later.

On the afternoon of 27 June, Stafford joined La Prade and Wasatch off the Virginia Capes to form Task Unit (TU) 29.6.6 which shaped a course for the Panama Canal. The three ships transited the canal on 3 July, and Stafford moored at Balboa. The following day, Independence Day 1944, she reported to the Pacific Fleet for duty and sailed for San Diego. Following repairs at the Destroyer Repair Base there, she got underway with La Prade for Hawaii and reached Pearl Harbor on 25 July. For almost a month, she engaged in anti-submarine warfare (ASW) training in the Hawaiian Islands.

On 18 August, Stafford and Fieberling steamed out of Pearl Harbor escorting TU 16.8.1 to the Marshall Islands. The ships arrived at Kwajalein on 25 August, and Stafford escorted SS Coast Skipper to Majuro the following day. On 29 August, she joined Dionne in the screen of Thetis Bay. The three warships made Pearl Harbor on 3 September, and the destroyer escort operated out of that base for just under two months. During that time, she joined in several anti-submarine warfare exercises. On 31 October, she departed Pearl Harbor with Task Group (TG) 12.3 to find and destroy an enemy submarine known to be prowling the sea lanes between Hawaii and the West Coast. Over the following two weeks, the task group made several contacts, attacked them with depth charges, but failed to locate and sink the elusive enemy. On 14 November, the task group received word that another unit had sunk its quarry; and it was ordered back to Pearl, where it arrived on 19 November.

Five days later, Stafford departed Pearl as an element of TG 12.4, bound for the central and western Pacific. The task group reached Eniwetok on 2 December, reported for duty to the Commander, Third Fleet, and was redesignated TG 30.6. The next day, the ships continued west, stopping over at Ulithi on the night of 7 and 8 December and at Saipan on 10 and 11 December. By 17 December, she reached Kossol Passage in the Palaus. The task group made an anti-submarine sweep 60 miles (97 km) in radius around Peleliu before heading for Ulithi, where it arrived on 22 December. On 28 December, the group, redesignated TU 77.4.13, exited the lagoon and returned to the Palaus the following day.

On New Year's Day 1945, Stafford sailed with the task unit from Kossol Roads screening units of Task Force 77 steaming toward Luzon. From Leyte, the task force sailed south through the Surigao Strait, then west along the northern coast of Mindanao, before turning north to skirt the coasts of Negros, Panay, Mindoro, and Luzon. Although air alerts were called from the second day out and HMAS Australia reported an unidentified plane's splashing close aboard, the kamikazes did not succeed in crashing a ship until late on 4 January, when one hit Ommaney Bay. The escort aircraft carrier had to be finished off by American torpedoes. By 5 January, the Japanese had determined that TF 77 was headed for Lingayen; and they intensified their air attacks accordingly. Late that afternoon, the task force, located just northwest of Manila Bay, came under moderately heavy kamikaze attacks.

At 1747, eight Japanese planes, probably Zeros, came in low and out of the sun. Stafford, Goss, and Ulvert M. Moore were screening Tulagi. The three escorts quickly brought their anti-aircraft batteries to bear and opened fire at targets approximately 8,000 yards (7,300 m) away. At about the same point, four of the enemies peeled off to the right. The remaining four bore down on the carrier and her three protectors. Each of the escorts splashed a plane, but the fourth kamikaze crashed into Stafford's starboard side, amidships, just abaft the stack. The stricken destroyer escort lost way rapidly, and she began taking on water. All crew members, save a nucleus crew, were transferred to Ulvert M. Moore; and all topside depth charges, K guns, and loading machines were jettisoned to improve her stability. Stafford remained in the vicinity of Lingayen until 11 January, when, after receiving the rest of her crew, save casualties, she departed with a slow convoy for Leyte.

She arrived at San Pedro Bay, Leyte, on 16 January, went into drydock for hull repairs on 19 January, and departed on 27 January with a convoy bound for Hollandia. Stafford and the tug Apache were detached from the convoy on 30 January, and the two ships put into Seeadler Harbor, Manus, five days later. After five days of additional repairs, she headed northeast for the United States. The destroyer escort stopped at Majuro from 13 to 15 February and at Pearl Harbor from 21 to 25 February on her way to the Mare Island Navy Yard. She underwent two months of repairs, from 4 March to 6 May, before rendezvousing with SS Philippa off the entrance to San Francisco Bay to head west once again. She arrived in Pearl Harbor on 14 May and spent the next 10 days in the local operating area. On 24 May, she joined TU 16.8.12 and escorted that formation to the Marshalls. She reached Eniwetok on 1 June and sailed with TU 96.6.9 the following day. The task unit made Ulithi Atoll on 6 June. A week later, she shaped course for Okinawa.

Stafford arrived off the Hagushi beaches on 17 June and moved into the anchorage at Kerama Retto the next day. Her arrival at Okinawa came very near the end of the struggle for that island. On 19 June, organized resistance on the island ceased, and operations were confined to mopping up the remnants of the Japanese defense force. With their loss of Okinawa, the Japanese concentrated upon readying planes and pilots for the expected invasion of the home islands. Consequently, Stafford suffered no kamikaze attacks during her tour of duty in the Ryukyus. She served on antisubmarine screen station, and her only scrape with the enemy occurred on 27 July when she evaded an airdropped torpedo.

Two months after her arrival in the Ryukyus, the fighting ended. Stafford continued anti-submarine patrols until 14 September, then rendezvoused with LST-792 and escorted the tank landing ship to Japan. They reached Nagasaki on 15 September. She embarked ex-POWs and departed on 18 September. The destroyer escort made Machinato Anchorage at Okinawa on 20 September and discharged her passengers the following day. She then moved to Buckner Bay and remained in that area until 11 October, when she headed back toward Japan. She operated in Japanese waters, visiting Nagasaki, Sasebo, Wakayama, and Yokosuka until November.

Stafford got underway from Yokosuka on 4 November, stopped in Pearl Harbor on the night of 13 and 14 November, and then continued on to San Francisco. On 22 November, she joined Corregidor at Alameda, California, and operated with the escort carrier as plane guard until 9 December. On 12 December, she reported to the Commander, 19th Fleet, at San Pedro Bay, for duty pending inactivation. Stafford began inactivation overhaul at Standard Shipbuilding Corporation, San Pedro, Los Angeles, on 3 January 1946.

== Fate ==
In January 1947, she was decommissioned and joined the Pacific Reserve Fleet, berthed at San Diego. Stafford was struck from the Navy List on 15 March 1972; and, on 13 June 1973, her hulk was sold to National Metal and Steel Corporation, Terminal Island, Los Angeles, California, for scrapping.

== Honors ==
Stafford earned two battle stars during World War II.
