= USS Goss =

U.S. Navy destroyer escort (1944-1958)

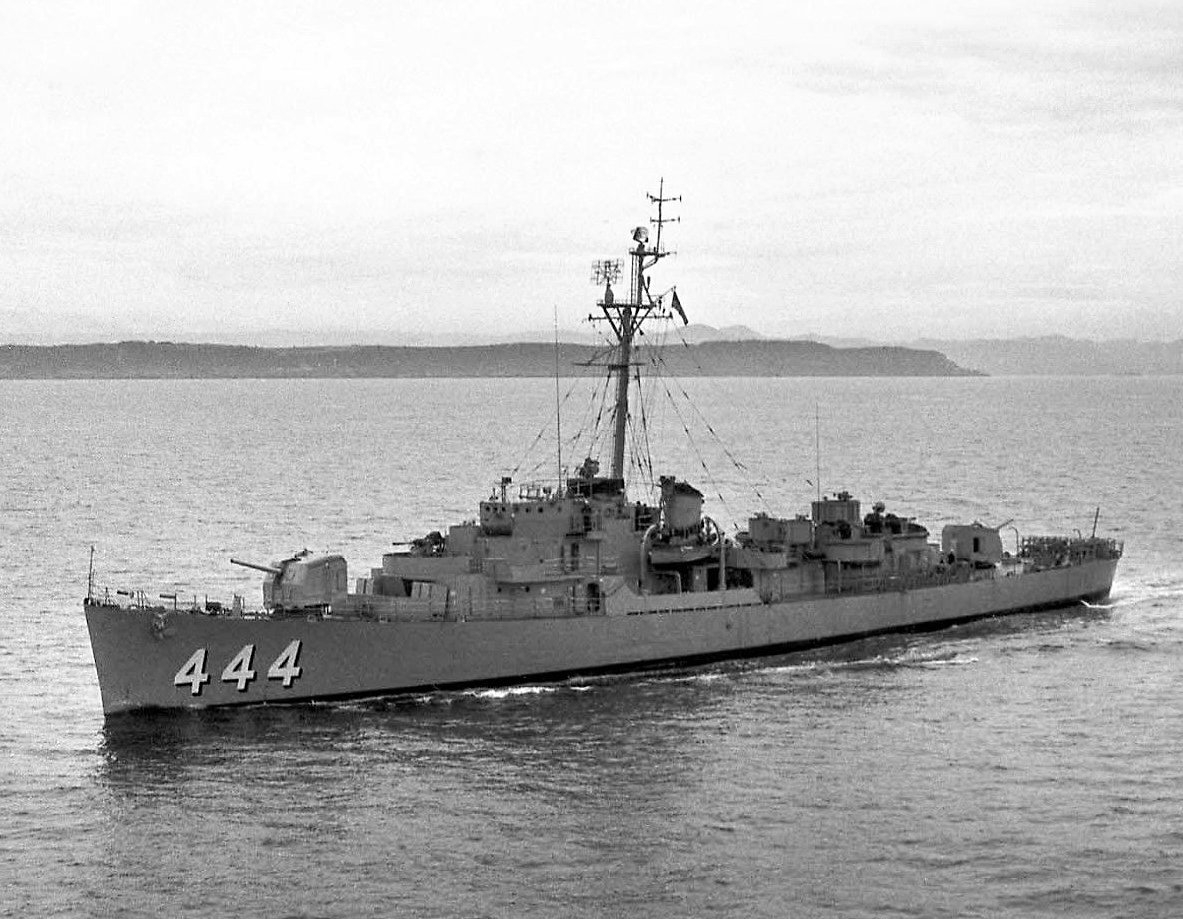

History

United States
- Name: USS Goss
- Namesake: Angus R. Goss
- Builder: Federal Shipbuilding & Dry Dock Co.
- Laid down: 16 December 1943
- Launched: 19 March 1944
- Sponsored by: Mrs. Jamie S. Goss
- Commissioned: 26 August 1944
- Decommissioned: 15 June 1946
- In service: 11th Naval District, January 1951
- Out of service: 10 October 1958
- Stricken: 1 March 1972
- Fate: Sold for scrapping 20 November 1972

General characteristics
- Displacement: 1,350 long tons (1,372 t)
- Length: 306 ft (93 m) overall
- Beam: 36 ft 10 in (11.23 m)
- Draught: 13 ft 4 in (4.06 m) maximum
- Propulsion: 2 boilers, 2 geared steam turbines, 12,000 shp, 2 screws
- Speed: 24 knots (44 km/h)
- Range: 6,000 nm @ 12 knots (22 km/h)
- Complement: 14 officers, 201 enlisted
- Armament: 2-5 in (130 mm), 4 (2 × 2) 40 mm AA, 10-20 mm guns AA, 3-21 inch (533 mm) torpedo tubes, 1 Hedgehog, 8 depth charge projectors, 2 depth charge tracks

USS Goss (DE-444) was a John C. Butler-class destroyer escort in service with the United States Navy from 1944 to 1946 and from 1951 to 1958. She was scrapped in 1972.

== History ==
Goss (DE-444) was named in honor of Marine Gunner Angus R. Goss who posthumously received the Navy Cross and Britain's Conspicuous Gallantry Medal for charging into a cave where the enemy was entrenched and single-handedly destroying the Japanese with a Reising sub-machine gun.

She was laid down 16 December 1943 by the Federal Shipbuilding & Dry Dock Co., Newark, New Jersey; launched 19 March 1944; sponsored by Mrs. Jamie S. Goss, sister-in-law of Marine Gunner Goss; and commissioned 26 August 1944.

=== Pacific War ===
After shakedown out of Bermuda, Goss departed Norfolk, Virginia, 30 October and steamed via the Panama Canal Zone and San Francisco, California, to Pearl Harbor, where she arrived 2 December and reported for duty. Goss was underway 5 December 1944 from Pearl Harbor via Eniwetok to Kossel Roads, Palau Islands, where she joined Tulagi (CVE-72) and four other destroyer escorts to form a hunter-killer group which operated off the Palau Islands.

As a unit of Vice Admiral Oldendorf's Bombardment and Fire Support Group, Goss sortied from Kossel Roads 1 January 1945 bound for Lingayen Gulf. In the early hours of 5 January, as Oldendorf's ships steamed within 150 miles of Japanese airfields on Luzon, they were spotted by scout planes. At 0758 combat air patrol intercepted 15 to 20 enemy planes 35 miles from the formation, shot down 9, and turned the others back. At noon another raid was intercepted and turned back about 45 miles from the ships.

The last and heaviest air attack of the day came at 1650 about 100 miles off Corregidor. Sixteen kamikazes with four escorts broke through combat air patrol to dive at the ships. They succeeded in hitting heavy cruisers Louisville (CA-28), and HMAS Australia; escort carrier Manila Bay (CVE-61); and destroyer escort Stafford (DE-411). In the fierce fight to repel this deadly threat, Goss was credited with shooting down two kamikazes.

Next day, cruising about 60 miles off Lingayen Gulf, the formation began breaking up into units with the battleships, cruisers, Beach Demolition Group and their escorts starting their separate missions. Goss, as part of the screen for Rear Admiral Durgin's Lingayen Carrier Group, gallantly carried out her mission in support of the Lingayen Landings until 20 January. Retiring from the area, she reached Mindoro dawn 21 January.

From 21 February to 6 June 1945 Goss operated as a unit of Admiral Stump's Task Group 52.1 under U.S. 5th Fleet as part of the close air support for the invasion of Iwo Jima. Goss continued her escort duties, next taking part in the Okinawa operations, last stop on the island road to Japan. This duty lasted until 30 June 1945.

Goss sortied from Ulithi 3 July as part of the screen for Admiral D. B. Beary's Logistic Support Group (TG 30.8). This group acted as the replenishment group for Admiral McCain's Carrier Task Force 38 as they struck the main islands of Japan with carrier planes and battleship guns. The Logistics Group operated in an area from 250 to 500 miles east of Honshū, fueling the fast carrier strike force and furnishing replacement aircraft.

Late in July Goss joined Task Group 94.17, a hunter-killer team, to operate along the shipping lanes southeast of Okinawa. From 7 through 24 August she operated with Task Group 75.19 as hunter-killer group east of Formosa. With the war over, Goss retired to San Pedro Bay 25 August and cleared that port 2 days later as part of the screen for Task Force 32 and 33, landing units of the U.S. 8th Army in Tokyo Bay 2 September.

=== Post-war activity ===
Goss continued her duties until 5 November when she departed Tokyo Bay for home. After touching at Pearl Harbor Goss arrived Los Angeles, California, 22 November 1945. She remained on the U.S. West Coast and decommissioned at San Diego, California, 15 June 1946 and joined the Pacific Reserve Fleet.

=== Cold War ===
Goss recommissioned 27 December 1950 at San Diego, Lt. Comdr. L. R. Hayes, commanding. Goss was assigned duty under Commandant, 11th Naval District as a reserve training ship. Her operations consisted of readiness and tactical cruises on the west coast from Alaska to South America as well as visits to Hawaii, Cuba and Panama.

=== Final decommissioning ===
Goss decommissioned at Astoria, Oregon, 10 October 1958 and again joined the Pacific Reserve Fleet. She was later transferred to Bremerton, Washington. On 1 March 1972, she was struck from the Navy list, and, on 20 November 1972, she was sold for scrapping.

== Military awards ==
Goss received four battle stars for World War II service.
