= USS Corregidor =

Casablanca-class escort carrier of the US Navy

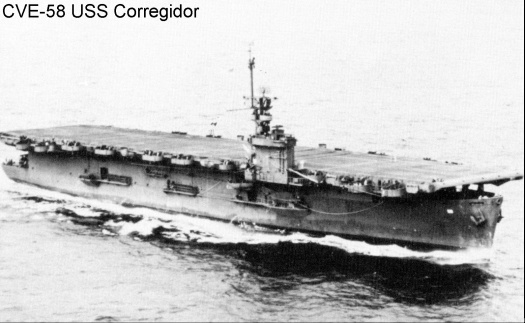
- USS Corregidor (CVE-58)

History

United States
- Name: HMS Atheling; Anguilla Bay; Corregidor
- Namesake: Ætheling; Anguilla Bay, Alaska; The Battle of Corregidor
- Ordered: as a Type S4-S2-BB3 hull, MCE hull 1095
- Awarded: 18 June 1942
- Builder: Kaiser Shipbuilding Company, Vancouver, Washington
- Cost: $6,033,429.05
- Yard number: 304
- Way number: 10
- Laid down: 17 December 1942
- Launched: 12 May 1943
- Commissioned: 31 August 1943
- Decommissioned: 30 July 1946
- Reclassified: ACV, 20 August 1942; CVE, 15 July 1943
- Identification: Hull symbol: AVG-58; ACV-58; CVE-58; Code letters: NXRB
- Honors and awards: 4 × battle stars
- Fate: Transferred to Military Sea Transportation Service (MSTS), 19 May 1951
- Name: Corregidor
- Operator: MSTS
- Commissioned: 19 May 1951
- Decommissioned: 4 September 1958
- Reclassified: CVU, 12 June 1955
- Identification: Hull symbol: T-CVU-58
- Fate: Sold for scrapping, 28 April 1959

General characteristics
- Class & type: Casablanca-class escort carrier
- Displacement: 8,188 long tons (8,319 t) (standard); 10,902 long tons (11,077 t) (full load)
- Length: 512 ft 3 in (156.13 m) (oa); 490 ft (150 m) (wl); 474 ft (144 m) (fd)
- Beam: 65 ft 2 in (19.86 m); 108 ft (33 m) (extreme width)
- Draft: 20 ft 9 in (6.32 m) (max)
- Installed power: 4 × Babcock & Wilcox boilers; 9,000 shp (6,700 kW)
- Propulsion: 2 × Skinner Unaflow reciprocating steam engines; 2 × screws
- Speed: 19 knots (35 km/h; 22 mph)
- Range: 10,240 nmi (18,960 km; 11,780 mi) at 15 knots (28 km/h; 17 mph)
- Complement: Total: 910–916 officers and men; Embarked Squadron: 50–56; Ship's Crew: 860
- Armament: As designed: 1 × 5 in (127 mm)/38 cal dual-purpose gun; 4 × twin 40 mm (1.57 in) Bofors anti-aircraft guns; 12 × 20 mm (0.79 in) Oerlikon anti-aircraft cannons; Varied, ultimate armament: 1 × 5 in (127 mm)/38 cal dual-purpose gun; 8 × twin 40 mm (1.57 in) Bofors anti-aircraft guns; 20 × 20 mm (0.79 in) Oerlikon anti-aircraft cannons
- Aircraft carried: 27 aircraft
- Aviation facilities: 1 × catapult; 2 × elevators

Service record
- Part of: United States Pacific Fleet (1943-46), Military Sealift Command (1951-58)
- Operations: Western New Guinea campaign, Battle of Saipan, Battle of Guam, Korean War, 1958 Lebanon crisis
- Awards: 4 Battle stars

USS Corregidor (AVG/ACV/CVE/CVU-58) was the fourth of fifty Casablanca-class escort carriers built to serve the United States Navy during World War II. Launched in May 1943, and commissioned the following August, she was originally named for Anguilla Bay, in Maurelle Island, in the Alexander Archipelago, of Alaska.

== Design and description ==
A side profile of the design of Thetis Bay.

Corregidor was a Casablanca-class escort carrier, the most numerous type of aircraft carriers ever built. Built to stem heavy losses during the Battle of the Atlantic, they came into service in late 1943, by which time the U-boat threat was already in retreat. Although some did see service in the Atlantic, the majority were utilized in the Pacific, ferrying aircraft, providing logistics support, and conducting close air support for the island-hopping campaigns. The Casablanca-class carriers were built on the standardized Type S4-S2-BB3 hull, a lengthened variant of the Doyen-class hull, and specifically designed to be mass-produced using welded prefabricated sections. This allowed them to be produced at unprecedented speeds: the final ship of her class, Munda, was delivered to the Navy just 101 days after the laying of her keel.

Corregidor was 512 ft 3 in (156.13 m) long overall (490 ft (150 m) at the waterline), had a beam of 65 ft 2 in (19.86 m), and a draft of 20 ft 9 in (6.32 m). She displaced 8,188 long tons (8,319 t) standard, which increased to 10,902 long tons (11,077 t) with a full load. To carry out flight operations, the ship had a 257 ft (78 m) hangar deck and a 474 ft (144 m) flight deck. Her compact size necessitated the installation of an aircraft catapult at her bow, and there were two aircraft elevators to facilitate movement of aircraft between the flight and hangar deck: one each fore and aft.

She was powered by four Babcock & Wilcox Express D boilers that raised 285 psi (1,970 kPa) of steam at 577 °F (303 °C). The steam generated by these boilers fed two Skinner Unaflow reciprocating steam engines, delivering 9,000 hp (6,700 kW) to two propeller shafts. This allowed her to reach speeds of 19 kn (35 km/h; 22 mph), with a cruising range of 10,240 nmi (18,960 km; 11,780 mi) at 15 kn (28 km/h; 17 mph). For armament, one 5 in (127 mm)/38 caliber dual-purpose gun was mounted on the stern. Additional anti-aircraft defense was provided by eight Bofors 40 mm (1.57 in) anti-aircraft guns in single mounts and twelve Oerlikon 20 mm (0.79 in) cannons mounted around the perimeter of the deck. By 1945, Casablanca-class carriers had been modified to carry twenty Oerlikon cannons and sixteen Bofors guns; the doubling of the latter was accomplished by putting them into twin mounts. Sensors onboard consisted of a SG surface-search radar and a SK air-search radar.

Although Casablanca-class escort carriers were intended to function with a crew of 860 and an embarked squadron of 50 to 56, the exigencies of wartime often necessitated the inflation of the crew count. They were designed to operate with 27 aircraft, but the hangar deck could accommodate much more during transport or training missions.

== Construction ==
Ordered as HMS Atheling, she was laid down as Anguilla Bay, was reclassified ACV-58 on 20 August 1942, and launched as Corregidor on 12 May 1943, by the Kaiser Shipbuilding Company, of Vancouver, Washington, under a Maritime Commission contract; sponsored by Mrs. J. Hallett. She was reclassified CVE-58 on 15 July 1943, acquired by the Navy on 31 August 1943; and commissioned the same day.

== Service history ==
=== World War II ===
Clearing San Diego, California, on 26 October 1943, Corregidor joined Carrier Division 24 (CarDiv 24) at Pearl Harbor for air strikes in the Gilbert Islands invasion from 10 November-6 December. She returned to San Diego, to undergo repairs and load aircraft and men, then resumed operations out of Pearl Harbor, with her division. From 22 January-3 March 1944, she sailed in the Marshall Islands operation, providing air cover for the invasion of Kwajalein.

Corregidor put to sea on 11 March 1944, for Guadalcanal, arriving there on 21 March. With the 3rd Fleet, she sortied on 30 March, to provide air cover for the landings on Emirau Island, returning to Port Purvis, on Florida Island, on 14 April. Two days later, she sailed to join the 7th Fleet for air operations at Hollandia (currently known as Jayapura), between 22 and 26 April, then put into Manus Island, for replenishment and antisubmarine patrols until 4 May. Embarking Commander, Carrier Division 24 for the Marianas operation, Corregidor provided combat air patrols and anti-aircraft support for the invasion of Saipan, from 15 to 25 June, with her aircraft accounting for at least eight enemy planes. She covered the logistics force off Eniwetok, from 1–3 July, then aided in the softening up bombardment of Guam, and provided air cover for the invasion until 28 July, when she returned to San Diego, for overhaul.

She worked on qualifying pilots in carrier operations at Pearl Harbor, from 12 October-21 November 1944. On 26 October, she formed as a hunter-killer group with EscDiv 64, around to check out reported enemy submarine movements between Pearl Harbor and California. On 2 January 1945, this group moved to patrol the area between Pearl Harbor and Eniwetok, to protect heavy Allied shipping, returning to Pearl Harbor, on 13 February.

Corregidor sailed from Pearl Harbor, on 27 February, to search for an overdue plane carrying Lieutenant General M. F. Harmon, USA, arriving at Majuro, on 20 March. From 21 March-27 April, she conducted an anti-submarine patrol in the vicinity of Japanese-held Wotje and Maloelap, in the Marshalls, then off Eniwetok. Future U.S. Congressman Ralph Hall flew off the Corregidor during this time.

=== Post-War ===
Returning to Pearl Harbor on 4 May 1945, Corregidor was assigned duty as a training ship in Hawaii, conducting carrier pilot qualifications until the end of the war. From 2 October 1945 – 10 January 1946, she alternated this duty with three voyages from Pearl Harbor to San Diego, to return homeward-bound servicemen. Corregidor cleared San Diego on 18 January 1946, for Norfolk, Virginia, arriving there on 4 February. Here she was placed out of commission in reserve on 30 July 1946.

=== Korea ===
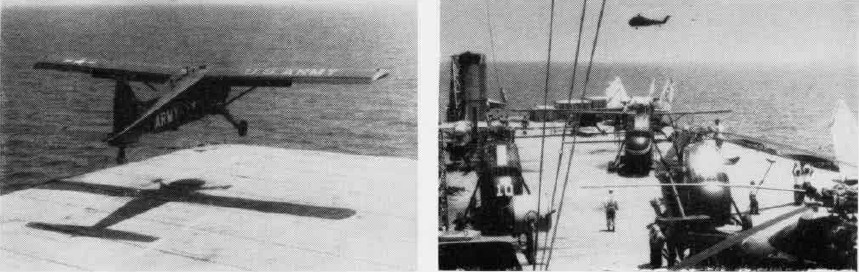
U.S. Army aircraft lift off Corregidor off Lebanon, 1958.

Newsreel video of Corregidor delivering H-34 helicopters to Bremerhaven in 1956.

Recommissioned on 19 May 1951, Corregidor was assigned to operate with the Military Sea Transport Service (MSTS). She ferried men, aircraft, and aviation cargo to NATO nations under the Mutual Defense Assistance Plan, but also made five voyages through the Panama Canal, to bring men and cargo to the United Nations forces in Korea, in 1952–1954. Corregidor was reclassified T-CVU-58 on 12 June 1955. When the Lebanon crisis broke in the summer of 1958, Corregidor was at Brindisi, Italy, and immediately lifted two reconnaissance planes of the 24th Infantry Division, and 10 helicopters to support the landings in Lebanon. Returning to the United States, the ship suffered hull damage in the Atlantic Ocean due to high seas on the night of 2 April 1958. She was transiting from Barcelona, Spain to NAS Pensacola, Florida, with 20 officers and 150 enlisted men. She made an emergency stop-over in the Azores. Corregidor was decommissioned on 4 September 1958, and sold for scrap on 28 April 1959.

== Awards ==
Corregidor received four battle stars for her World War II service.

American Campaign Medal	Asiatic-Pacific Campaign Medal (4 battle stars)	World War II Victory Medal
Navy Occupation Service Medal (with Europe clasp)	National Defense Service Medal	Korean Service Medal
Armed Forces Expeditionary Medal	United Nations Korean Medal	Republic of Korea War Service Medal (retroactive)

== General sources ==
=== Online sources ===
- "Corregidor Statistics". United States Maritime Commission.
- "Corregidor (CVE-58)". Dictionary of American Naval Fighting Ships. Naval History and Heritage Command. 8 April 2020.
- "Kaiser Vancouver, Vancouver WA". www.ShipbuildingHistory.com. 27 November 2010.
- "USS CORREGIDOR (CVE-58)". NavSource. 16 August 2020.
- "World Aircraft Carriers List: US Escort Carriers, S4 Hulls". Hazegray.org. 14 December 1998. Archived from the original on 19 November 2021.
- ""High Seas Crack Hull of Carrier"". The Washington Post and Times-Herald. Vol. 81, no. 119. Associated Press. 3 April 1958. p. A3.

=== Bibliography ===
- Adcock, Al (1996), Escort Carriers in Action - Warships No. 9, Carrollton, Texas: Squadron/Signal Publications, ISBN 9780897473569
- Chesneau, Robert; Gardiner, Robert (1980), Conway's All the World's Fighting Ships 1922–1946, London, England: Naval Institute Press, ISBN 9780870219139
- Friedman, Norman (1983), U.S. Aircraft Carriers: An Illustrated Design History, Annapolis, Maryland: Naval Institute Press, ISBN 9780870217395
- Ross, Al (1993), The Escort Carrier Gambier Bay, Anatomy of the Ship, London, England: Conway Maritime Press, ISBN 9781557502353
- Y'Blood, William (2012), The Little Giants: U.S. Escort Carriers Against Japan, Annapolis, Maryland: Naval Institute Press, ISBN 9781612512471
