= USS Tulagi =

Casablanca-class escort carrier of the US Navy

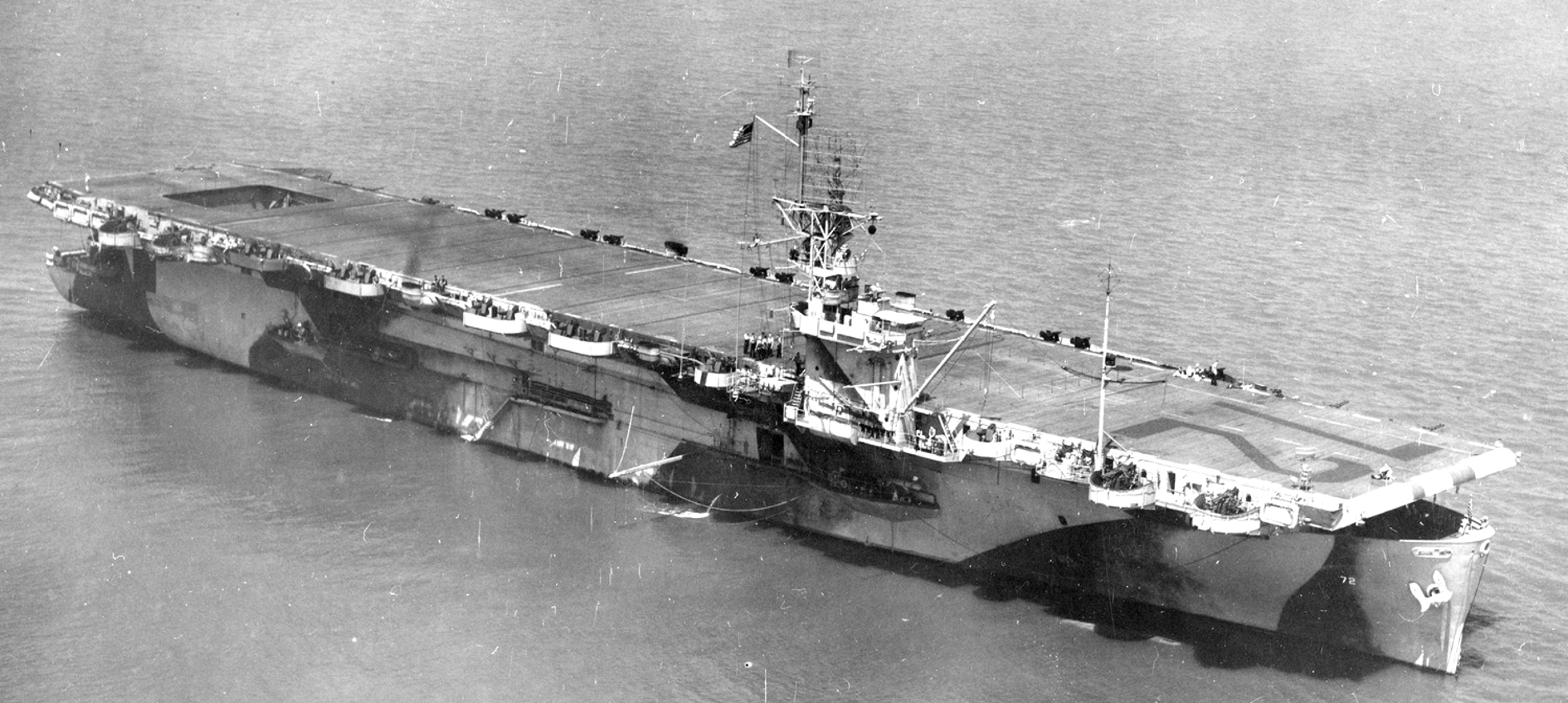

History

United States
- Name: Tulagi
- Namesake: The Battle of Tulagi, 7–8 August 1942
- Ordered: as Fortazela Bay
- Builder: Kaiser Company
- Laid down: 7 June 1943
- Launched: 15 November 1943
- Commissioned: 21 December 1943
- Decommissioned: 30 April 1946
- Stricken: 8 May 1946
- Fate: Sold 1946 and scrapped

General characteristics
- Class & type: Casablanca-class escort carrier
- Displacement: 7,800 tons
- Length: 512 ft 3 in (156.13 m)
- Beam: 65 ft (20 m); 108 ft (33 m) maximum width
- Draft: 22 ft 6 in (6.86 m)
- Speed: 19 knots (35 km/h)
- Complement: 860
- Armament: 1 × 5-inch/38 cal. DP gun; 16 × 40 mm AA cannon in 8 twin mounts; 20 × 20 mm guns AA machine guns in single mounts

Service record
- Operations: Operation Dragoon; Philippines campaign; Invasion of Iwo Jima; Battle of Okinawa
- Awards: 4 Battle stars

USS Tulagi (CVE-72) was a Casablanca-class escort carrier of the United States Navy.

She was laid down on 7 June 1943 at Vancouver, Washington, United States, by the Kaiser Company, Inc., as Fortazela Bay (ACV-72); and redesignated CVE-72 on 15 July 1943. However, her name was corrected to read Fortaleza Bay on 19 October 1943, and the ship was renamed Tulagi on 6 November 1943; launched on 15 November 1943; sponsored by Mrs. James Duke Earner; and commissioned on 21 December 1943, Capt. Joseph Campbell Cronin in command.

== Design and description ==
A side profile of the design of Thetis Bay.

Tulagi was a Casablanca-class escort carrier, the most numerous type of aircraft carriers ever built. Built to stem heavy losses during the Battle of the Atlantic, they came into service in late 1943, by which time the U-boat threat was already in retreat. Although some did see service in the Atlantic, the majority were utilized in the Pacific, ferrying aircraft, providing logistics support, and conducting close air support for the island-hopping campaigns. The Casablanca-class carriers were built on the standardized Type S4-S2-BB3 hull, a lengthened variant of the Doyen-class hull, and specifically designed to be mass-produced using welded prefabricated sections. This allowed them to be produced at unprecedented speeds: the final ship of her class, Munda, was delivered to the Navy just 101 days after the laying of her keel.

Tulagi was 512 ft 3 in (156.13 m) long overall (490 ft (150 m) at the waterline), had a beam of 65 ft 2 in (19.86 m), and a draft of 20 ft 9 in (6.32 m). She displaced 8,188 long tons (8,319 t) standard, which increased to 10,902 long tons (11,077 t) with a full load. To carry out flight operations, the ship had a 257 ft (78 m) hangar deck and a 474 ft (144 m) flight deck. Her compact size necessitated the installation of an aircraft catapult at her bow, and there were two aircraft elevators to facilitate movement of aircraft between the flight and hangar deck: one each fore and aft.

She was powered by four Babcock & Wilcox Express D boilers that raised 285 psi (1,970 kPa) of steam at 577 °F (303 °C). The steam generated by these boilers fed two Skinner Unaflow reciprocating steam engines, delivering 9,000 hp (6,700 kW) to two propeller shafts. This allowed her to reach speeds of 19 kn (35 km/h; 22 mph), with a cruising range of 10,240 nmi (18,960 km; 11,780 mi) at 15 kn (28 km/h; 17 mph). For armament, one 5 in (127 mm)/38 caliber dual-purpose gun was mounted on the stern. Additional anti-aircraft defense was provided by eight Bofors 40 mm (1.57 in) anti-aircraft guns in single mounts and twelve Oerlikon 20 mm (0.79 in) cannons mounted around the perimeter of the deck. By 1945, Casablanca-class carriers had been modified to carry twenty Oerlikon cannons and sixteen Bofors guns; the doubling of the latter was accomplished by putting them into twin mounts. Sensors onboard consisted of a SG surface-search radar and a SK air-search radar.

Although Casablanca-class escort carriers were intended to function with a crew of 860 and an embarked squadron of 50 to 56, the exigencies of wartime often necessitated the inflation of the crew count. They were designed to operate with 27 aircraft, but the hangar deck could accommodate much more during transport or training missions.

== Service history ==
The new escort carrier got underway from Seattle on 17 January 1944 bound for San Francisco where she was immediately pressed into service ferrying stores, airplanes, and military personnel to Hawaii. She departed Pearl Harbor for the homeward voyage on 29 January and arrived at San Diego with her load of passengers on 4 February. Throughout most of February, she participated in training exercises out of San Diego before steaming, via the Canal Zone, for Hampton Roads, Virginia. Following her arrival at Norfolk on 17 March, Tulagi underwent overhaul and carrier qualification tests.

Tulagi embarked a load of Army Air Forces planes late in May and departed New York on the 28th in convoy with two other carriers and their screen. On 6 June, Tulagi entered her first foreign port as she steamed the swept channel approach to Casablanca. After disembarking her cargo, the carrier took on passengers including a group of 35 prisoners of war and then headed home.

After arriving at Norfolk on 17 June 1944, Tulagi got underway late in June for Quonset Point, Rhode Island, where she embarked personnel, planes, and equipment. On the last day of the month, she departed Narragansett Bay with Rear Admiral Calvin T. Durgin on board as Commander, Task Group 27.7, and steamed eastward conducting squadron and battery training en route to Oran, Algeria. Tulagi visited Malta on 26 July and then spent the following weeks conducting exercises, which included a dress rehearsal out of African and Italian ports for the coming Operation Dragoon, the invasion of southern France.

On D-Day, Tulagi steamed in formation 45 miles off the invasion beach; and, at 0546, she launched her first flight of F6F Hellcats. In the next week, aircraft from Tulagi flew a total of 68 missions and 276 sorties, inflicting considerable damage on the enemy. Weather was generally good as carrier-based planes conducted spotting missions and made strikes at various targets ashore, including gun emplacements and railway facilities. On 21 August, Tulagi's last day in support of Operation "Dragoon", German forces were in retreat before the Allied thrust. Tulagi's fliers conducted a devastating attack along the line of march of a German convoy which snarled the roads for miles around Remoulins and crowned her achievements of the day by downing three German Junkers Ju 52s.

After taking on supplies and fuel at Oran, she got underway for home on 6 September. Following a quick overhaul at Norfolk, the escort carrier set her course for Panama; transited the Canal; and arrived at San Diego on 26 October. There, she embarked two air squadrons for transportation to Hawaii and departed the west coast on 29 October 1944.

Following her arrival at Pearl Harbor on 5 November, the carrier participated in antisubmarine warfare and gunnery exercises. On the 24th, she got underway in company with a special antisubmarine task group which conducted sweeps as it steamed via the Marshalls and Ulithi for Saipan. Throughout December, Tulagi continued antisubmarine activities in the Palaus and the southern Marianas.

On the first day of the new year, 1945, Tulagi got underway for Lingayen Gulf and the impending invasion of Luzon. Meanwhile, the Japanese in the Philippines had assigned more than 100 suicide planes for a concerted attack on Tulagi's task force. The convoy passed through Surigao Strait into the Mindanao Sea on 3 January. In the following three days, the kamikazes took their toll. On the 4th, reports of enemy aircraft in the area became more frequent; and, late in the afternoon, a suicide plane crashed while trying to dive into Lunga Point. Moments later, observers on Tulagi saw the conflagration which marked the death throes of Ommaney Bay, the victim of another kamikaze. On the morning of 5 January, enemy air attackers continued to menace the convoy as it steamed through Mindoro Strait and into the South China Sea. Although fighters from the carrier shot down two Mitsubishi A6M Zeros, three enemy aircraft succeeded in penetrating the defenses of the convoy. Two were shot down, but one managed to crash into Louisville, a member of the convoy's screen.

When landing began at Lingayen Gulf on 9 January 1945, Tulagi launched her planes for air strikes on land targets, anti-snooper patrols, and air cover for American vessels. On 12 January, Tulagi supplied air support for the Lingayen Gulf beachhead; and, the next day, her port battery shot down a suicide plane which had singled out the carrier for destruction. Before it crashed, the attacker, deflected from Tulagi by withering anti-aircraft fire, crossed astern and to starboard of the escort carrier and vainly attempted to dive into an alternate target. On 17 January, the Army Air Force assumed responsibility for direct air support of American operations in Lingayen Gulf; and Tulagi's fliers turned their attention toward the Zambales coast where they provided cover for support and protection of forces near San Narcisco. On 5 February, Tulagi arrived at Ulithi after a grueling period of sustained flight operations during which her planes had been in the air for all but two of 32 days.

Tulagi departed Guam on 21 February to conduct hunter-killer exercises in support of the assault on Iwo Jima before joining a task unit in "area Varnish" west of Iwo Jima on 1 March. She supplied air support and antisubmarine patrols until departing the area on 11 March, bound for Ulithi. Arriving there on 14 March, she prepared for the invasion of the Ryukyus.

Assigned alternately to antisubmarine and direct support activities, Tulagi operated continuously off the coast of Okinawa from the end of March until early June. On 3 April, four Zeros attacked her formation, and all were shot down. On the 6th, while Tulagi was anchored at Kerama Retto for rearming, a Japanese air attack penetrated air space over the harbor. The carrier took one of her attackers under fire at 4,000 yards, but the Japanese plane came harrowingly close before turning aside to dive into a nearby LST which burst into flames 200 feet high. Minutes later, Tulagi shot down another attacker and chased off a third with her accurate fire. The next day, Tulagi resumed her station off Okinawa, providing planes for air strikes called in by ground observers and for running photo-reconnaissance and patrol missions. On the 13th, after she launched a special strike against the airfields of Miyako Jima, she began antisubmarine operations along the shipping lanes approaching Okinawa.

Following this long and arduous tour, Tulagi arrived at Guam on 6 June 1945. The carrier departed the Marianas on the 8th, bound for San Diego. She remained on the west coast throughout the summer undergoing overhaul, trials, and training. Peace came while she was at San Diego, but she departed the west coast again on 4 September and steamed via Hawaii for the Philippines. At Samar, she embarked planes for transportation back to the United States and reached Pearl Harbor in October. After returning to San Diego in January 1946, the veteran escort carrier reported to the 19th Fleet at Port Angeles, Washington, on 2 February 1946 for inactivation. She was decommissioned on 30 April 1946 and struck from the Navy List on 8 May 1946.

== Awards ==
Tulagi received four battle stars for World War II service.
