= USS Sitkoh Bay =

Casablanca-class escort carrier of the US Navy

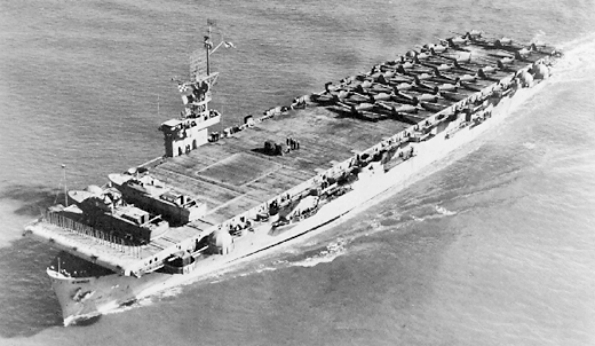
- USS Sitkoh Bay underway transporting aircraft, date unknown

History

United States
- Name: Sitkoh Bay
- Namesake: Sitkoh Bay, Chichagof Island, Alaska
- Ordered: as a Type S4-S2-BB3 hull, MCE hull 1123
- Awarded: 18 June 1942
- Builder: Kaiser Shipyards
- Laid down: 23 November 1943
- Launched: 19 February 1944
- Commissioned: 28 March 1944
- Decommissioned: 30 November 1946
- Recommissioned: 29 July 1950
- Decommissioned: 27 July 1954
- Stricken: 1 April 1960
- Identification: Hull symbol: CVE-86
- Honors and awards: 4 Battle stars
- Fate: Scrapped in January 1961

General characteristics
- Class & type: Casablanca-class escort carrier
- Displacement: 8,188 long tons (8,319 t) (standard); 10,902 long tons (11,077 t) (full load)
- Length: 512 ft 3 in (156.13 m) (oa); 490 ft (150 m) (wl); 474 ft (144 m) (fd)
- Beam: 65 ft 2 in (19.86 m); 108 ft (33 m) (extreme width)
- Draft: 20 ft 9 in (6.32 m) (max)
- Installed power: 4 × Babcock & Wilcox boilers; 9,000 shp (6,700 kW)
- Propulsion: 2 × Skinner Unaflow reciprocating steam engines; 2 × screws
- Speed: 19 knots (35 km/h; 22 mph)
- Range: 10,240 nmi (18,960 km; 11,780 mi) at 15 kn (28 km/h; 17 mph)
- Complement: Total: 910 – 916 officers and men; Embarked Squadron: 50 – 56; Ship's Crew: 860
- Armament: As designed: 1 × 5 in (127 mm)/38 cal dual-purpose gun; 4 × twin 40 mm (1.57 in) Bofors anti-aircraft guns; 12 × 20 mm (0.79 in) Oerlikon anti-aircraft cannons; Varied, ultimate armament: 1 × 5 in (127 mm)/38 cal dual-purpose gun; 8 × twin 40 mm (1.57 in) Bofors anti-aircraft guns; 20 × 20 mm (0.79 in) Oerlikon anti-aircraft cannons
- Aircraft carried: 27
- Aviation facilities: 1 × catapult; 2 × elevators

Service record
- Part of: United States Pacific Fleet (1944–1946); Pacific Reserve Fleet (1946–1950); Military Sealift Command (1950–1954); Pacific Reserve Fleet (1954-1960)
- Operations: Philippines campaign; Invasion of Iwo Jima; Battle of Okinawa; Korean War

USS Sitkoh Bay (CVE-86) was the thirty-second of fifty Casablanca-class escort carriers built for the United States Navy during World War II. She was named after Sitkoh Bay, located within Chichagof Island, of the Territory of Alaska. The ship was launched in February 1944, commissioned in March, and served as a replenishment and transport carrier throughout the Philippines campaign, the Invasion of Iwo Jima and the Battle of Okinawa. She was decommissioned in November 1946, when she was mothballed in the Atlantic Reserve Fleet. With the outbreak of the Korean War, however, she was called back to service, continuing to serve as a transport and utility carrier with the Military Sealift Command until 1954, when she was once again decommissioned, and mothballed in the Pacific Reserve Fleet. Ultimately, she was broken up in January 1961.

== Design and description ==
A side profile of the design of Thetis Bay.

Sitkoh Bay was a Casablanca-class escort carrier, the most numerous type of aircraft carriers ever built. Built to stem heavy losses during the Battle of the Atlantic, they came into service in late 1943, by which time the U-boat threat was already in retreat. Although some did see service in the Atlantic, the majority were utilized in the Pacific, ferrying aircraft, providing logistics support, and conducting close air support for the island-hopping campaigns. The Casablanca-class carriers were built on the standardized Type S4-S2-BB3 hull, a lengthened variant of the Doyen-class hull, and specifically designed to be mass-produced using welded prefabricated sections. This allowed them to be produced at unprecedented speeds: the final ship of her class, Munda, was delivered to the Navy just 101 days after the laying of her keel.

Sitkoh Bay was 512 ft 3 in (156.13 m) long overall (490 ft (150 m) at the waterline), had a beam of 65 ft 2 in (19.86 m), and a draft of 20 ft 9 in (6.32 m). She displaced 8,188 long tons (8,319 t) standard, which increased to 10,902 long tons (11,077 t) with a full load. To carry out flight operations, the ship had a 257 ft (78 m) hangar deck and a 474 ft (144 m) flight deck. Her compact size necessitated the installation of an aircraft catapult at her bow, and there were two aircraft elevators to facilitate movement of aircraft between the flight and hangar deck: one each fore and aft.

She was powered by four Babcock & Wilcox Express D boilers that raised 285 psi (1,970 kPa) of steam at 577 °F (303 °C). The steam generated by these boilers fed two Skinner Unaflow reciprocating steam engines, delivering 9,000 hp (6,700 kW) to two propeller shafts. This allowed her to reach speeds of 19 kn (35 km/h; 22 mph), with a cruising range of 10,240 nmi (18,960 km; 11,780 mi) at 15 kn (28 km/h; 17 mph). For armament, one 5 in (127 mm)/38 caliber dual-purpose gun was mounted on the stern. Additional anti-aircraft defense was provided by eight Bofors 40 mm (1.57 in) anti-aircraft guns in single mounts and twelve Oerlikon 20 mm (0.79 in) cannons mounted around the perimeter of the deck. By 1945, Casablanca-class carriers had been modified to carry twenty Oerlikon cannons and sixteen Bofors guns; the doubling of the latter was accomplished by putting them into twin mounts. Sensors onboard consisted of a SG surface-search radar and a SK air-search radar.

Although Casablanca-class escort carriers were intended to function with a crew of 860 and an embarked squadron of 50 to 56, the exigencies of wartime often necessitated the inflation of the crew count. They were designed to operate with 27 aircraft, but the hangar deck could accommodate much more during transport or training missions.

== Construction ==
Her construction was awarded to Kaiser Shipbuilding Company, Vancouver, Washington under a Maritime Commission contract, on 18 June 1942. The escort carrier was laid down on 23 November 1943 under the name Sitkoh Bay, as part of a tradition which named escort carriers after bays or sounds in Alaska. She was laid down as MC hull 1123, the thirty-second of a series of fifty Casablanca-class escort carriers. She therefore received the classification symbol CVE-86, indicating that she was the eighty-sixth escort carrier to be commissioned into the United States Navy. She was launched on 19 February 1944; sponsored by Mrs. Kathryn Mullinix, the widow of Rear admiral Henry M. Mullinnix, who had perished when her sister Liscome Bay was sunk by the Japanese submarine I-175; transferred to the Navy and commissioned on 28 March 1944, with Captain Robert Green Lockhart in command.

== Service history ==
=== World War II ===
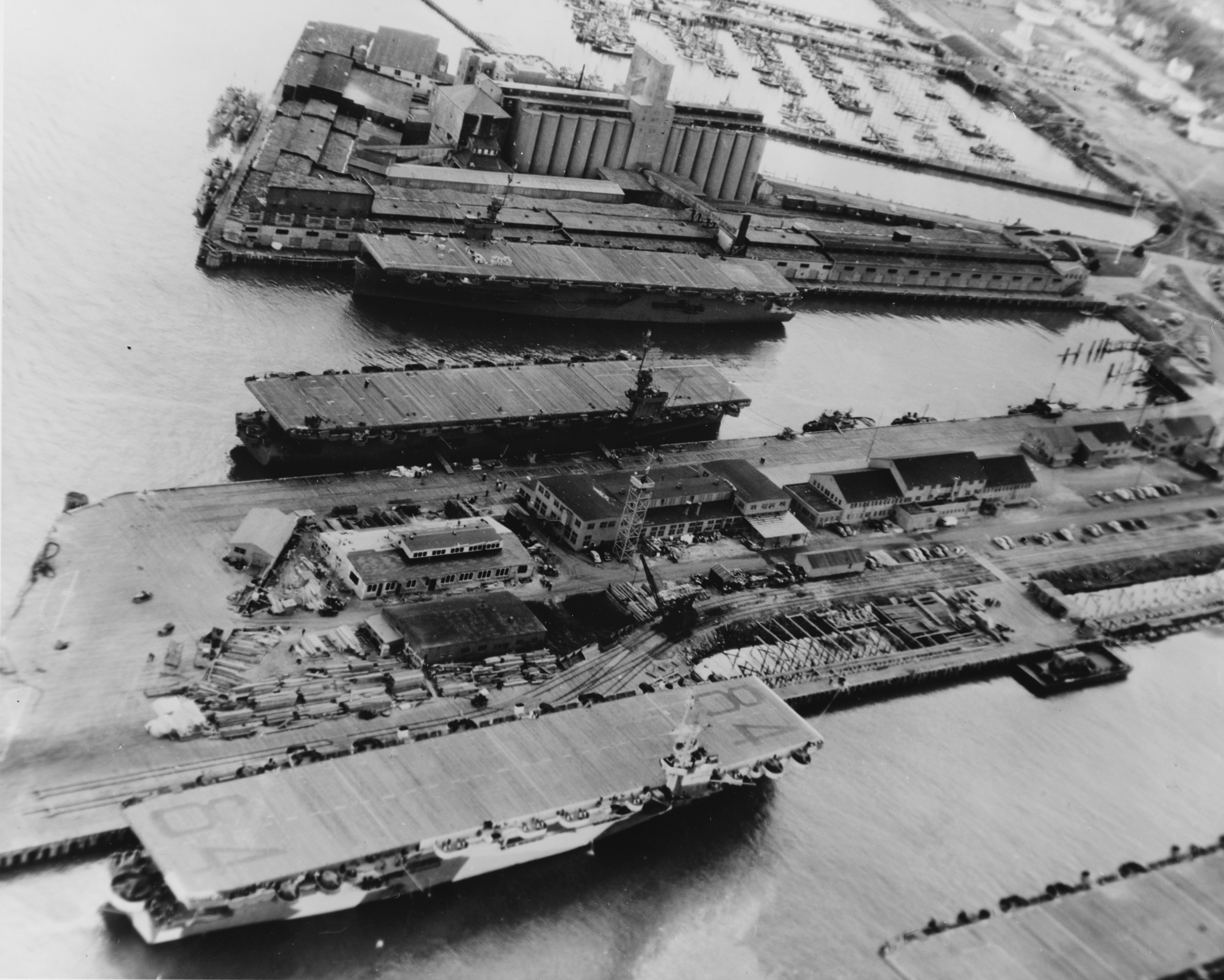
Three Casablanca-class escort carriers berthed at Astoria, Oregon, 6 April 1944. The topmost carrier is Sitkoh Bay.

Upon being commissioned, Sitkoh Bay underwent a shakedown cruise down the West Coast to Naval Air Station Alameda, and upon arriving on 28 April, she took on a load of cargo and passengers. She left Alameda on 30 April, bound for Pearl Harbor, and for the next half-year, she carried out routine transport missions between California and various bases scattered throughout the Central and South Pacific, as a part of Task Group 30.8, the Fleet Oiler and Transport Group, under the command of Captain Jasper T. Acuff. For example, during the latter part of 1944, she touched Majuro in the Marshall Islands, Manus in the Admiralty Islands, transiting via Pearl Harbor. The aircraft and passengers delivered on these transport missions went to the United States Third Fleet and the United States Seventh Fleet, respectively, although the ship's action report did note that a significant portion of these replenishment aircraft were recycled from damaged carriers returning to the backline, and that they were often in rather poor condition. The air personnel that were delivered could also be of questionable quality, with some sitting in the reserve pool rarely flying for up to eight months. For example, the flight surgeon of Sitkoh Bay reported visiting a pilot who suffered from epilepsy, and another pilot who displayed a suicidal ideation regarding hurling himself into a spinning propeller.

In January 1945, Sitkoh Bay became a replenishment carrier solely dedicated to resupplying the Third Fleet within the Central Pacific, as it participated in the Philippines campaign, the Invasion of Iwo Jima, and prepared for the Battle of Okinawa. During this period, her ports of call included Guam and Roi-Namur, both in the Marianas Islands, Enewetak Atoll in the Marshalls, and Ulithi Atoll, located in the Caroline Islands. On one of these stops, Captain James Paul Walker raised his flag over the vessel on 1 February.

Sitkoh Bay continued these replenishment duties until 1 April, when she joined up with the Special Escort Carrier Group, along with her sisters Hollandia, White Plains, and the Bogue-class escort carrier Breton. The escort carriers were screened by the Wickes-class destroyers Kilty and Manley, as well as the Clemson-class destroyers George E. Badger and Greene. Together, the four escort carriers had the task of delivering Marine Aircraft Group 31, of which Sitkoh Bay was assigned to transport, and Marine Aircraft Group 33, in total consisting of 192 F4U Corsairs and 30 F6F Hellcats to Okinawa. There, they would be the first land-based aircraft to participate in the battle, operating off of the captured Kadena Air Base.

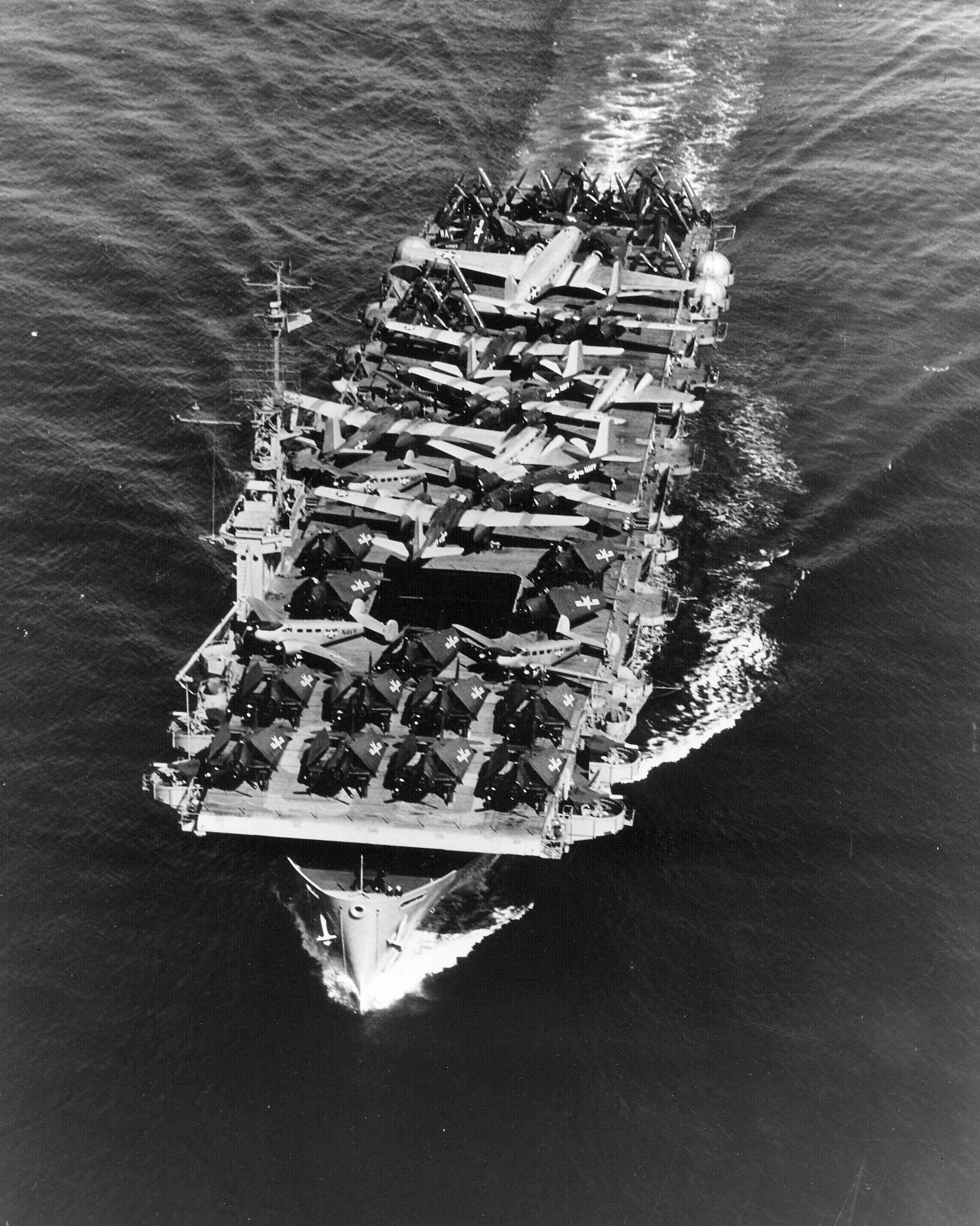
Sitkoh Bay underway with a load of aircraft on board, date and location unknown.

The Special Escort Carrier Group departed from Ulithi on 2 April, and Sitkoh Bay arrived off of Okinawa on 6 April without much incident, although the screening destroyers dropped depth charges on the way to deter a suspected submarine. Therefore, she began transferring her air contingent to land. On 7 April, however, the escort carriers came under kamikaze attack. At the time, she was 60 miles (97 km) southeast of Okinawa, and at around noon that day, she began launching some F4U-4C variant Corsairs to Yomitan Auxiliary Airfield. By 15:28, she had already launched eight Corsairs, and the flight deck was being respotted when a Yokosuka P1Y kamikaze aircraft made an appearance. The kamikaze was engaged by five fighters of VMF-311 operating off of Breton, and although they did heavily damage the aircraft and set it on fire, the kamikaze was able to get close enough to make a dive for the bridge of Sitkoh Bay. The kamikaze was met by heavy anti-aircraft fire, and it wobbled, ultimately crashing about 100 yards (91 m) off the carrier's port beam, with the kill being accredited to Lieutenant John J. Doherty. The following day, on 8 April, she left the area for Pearl Harbor, stopping at Guam. There, she returned to her previous replenishment routine.

After the announcement of the Surrender of Japan on 15 August, Sitkoh Bay continued her replenishment duties with the Third Fleet, cruising with it along the southeastern coast of Honshū from 25 August to 5 September. On 10 September, she entered Enewetak harbor, before departing on 11 September for Guam. She then made transport missions ferrying between Guam, Samar Island in the Philippines, and Okinawa. She returned to Pearl Harbor on 18 October, and proceeded eastwards, arriving at San Diego on 26 October for availability. After a series of further transport missions to the Central Pacific throughout the rest of 1945 and 1946, she steamed into Bremerton, Washington on 30 November 1946, where she was decommissioned and mothballed with the Pacific Reserve Fleet, as part of its Bremerton group.

=== Korean War ===
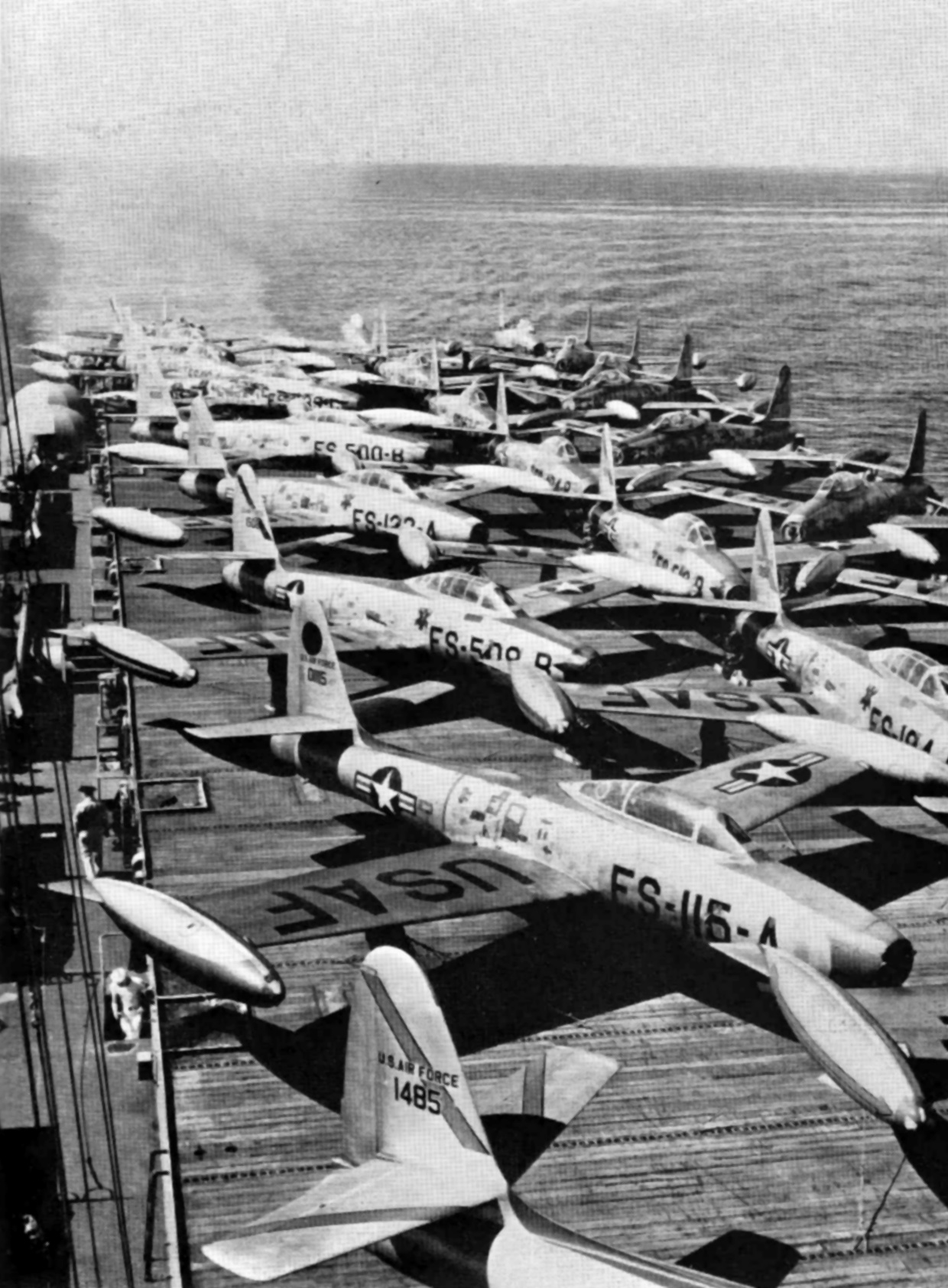
USAF Republic F-84 Thunderjet fighter-bombers bound for Japan photographed on board the flight deck of Sitkoh Bay, August 1951. The aircraft are a part of the 12th Fighter-Escort Wing.

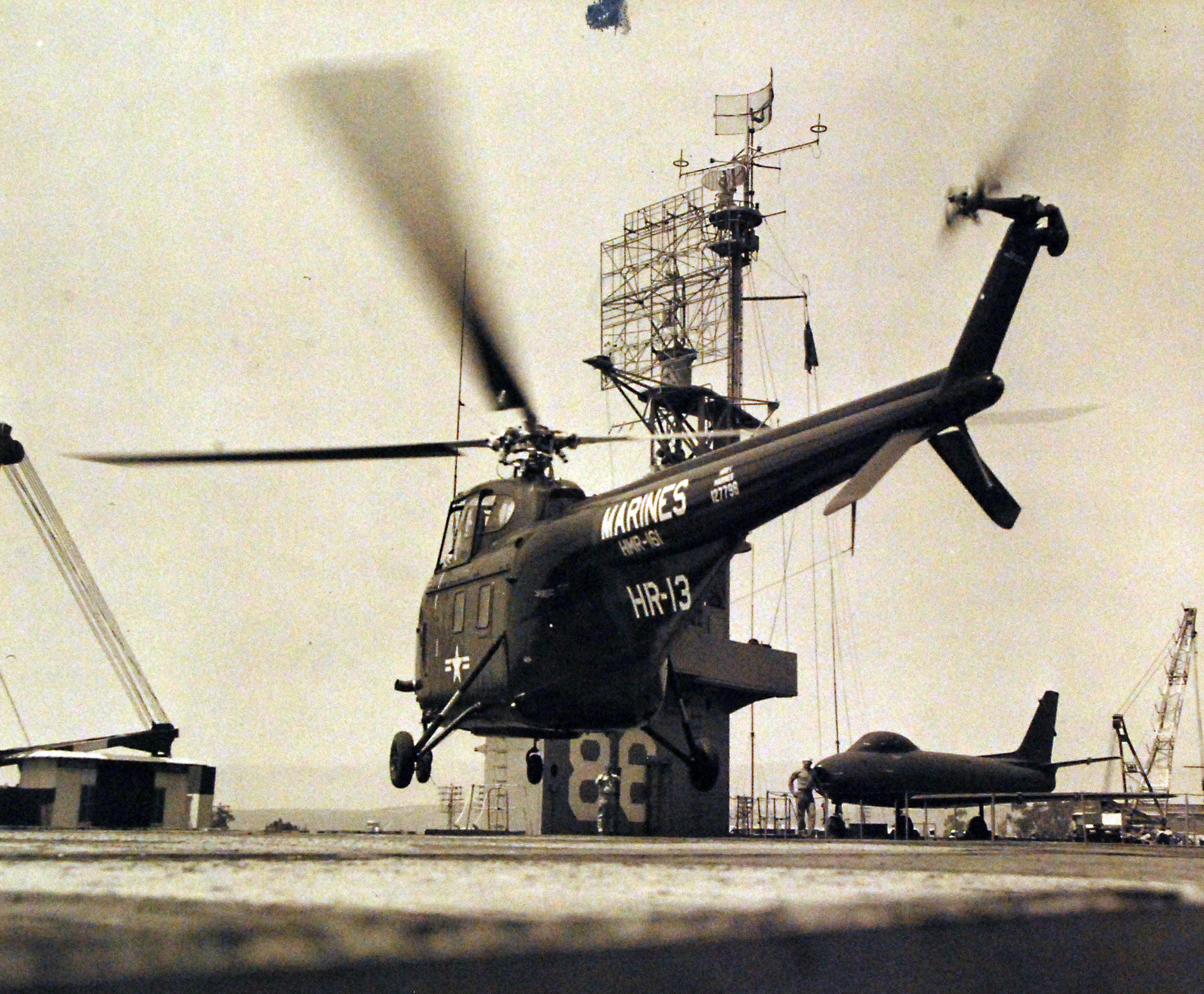
A Marine helicopter from HMR-161 lands on the flight deck of Sitkoh Bay, 23 September 1951.

Sitkoh Bay continued to be mothballed with the Pacific Reserve Fleet until the Korean War broke out during the summer of 1950. With the United States intervening in the war, under the auspices of the United Nations, Sitkoh Bay was recommissioned and reclassified as an aircraft transport with the hull symbol T-CVE-86 on 29 July 1950 at Bremerton, with Captain Charles Williams Lord in command. As an aircraft transport, she was operated by the Military Sea Transportation Service (MSTS) with a civilian crew, but with a military command. For the next four years, she transported aircraft between the West Coast and Japan. Her major ports of call were San Francisco, San Diego, Pearl Harbor, Yokohama, and Yokosuka.

Sitkoh Bay only deviated from these ports of call three times during this time period. In March 1951, she delivered a load of F8F Bearcats to French Indochina, where the French were fighting against the Viet Minh in the First Indochina War. On her way back, she stopped at Manila, the capital of the Philippines. In September 1951, she visited Busan, Republic of Korea. In May 1952, she sailed directly from Yokosuka back to San Francisco, without stopping at Pearl Harbor on the way back.

With the end of the Korean War, the demand for aircraft in the Pacific theater decreased. Therefore, Sitkoh Bay was decommissioned again on 27 July 1954, when she rejoined the Pacific Reserve Fleet, this time as part of its San Francisco group. On 12 June 1955, she was redesignated as a utility aircraft carrier, receiving the hull symbol CVU-86. In mid-March 1958, she was moved south from San Francisco to San Diego. On 7 May 1959, she was redesignated as an aviation transport, receiving the hull symbol AKV-86. She was struck from the Navy list on 1 April 1960, and subsequently sold for scrapping to Eisenberg & Co. of New York City on 30 August. The ship was ultimately scrapped in Japan throughout January 1961. Sitkoh Bay received three battle stars for her World War II service, and one for her Korean War service.

== Sources ==
=== Online sources ===
- "'Sitkoh Bay' (CVE-86)". Dictionary of American Naval Fighting Ships. Naval History and Heritage Command. 27 April 2016. Archived from the original on 21 October 2020. This article incorporates text from this source, which is in the public domain.
- "Kaiser Vancouver, Vancouver WA". www.ShipbuildingHistory.com. 27 November 2010. Archived from the original on 16 June 2019.
- "World Aircraft Carriers List: US Escort Carriers, S4 Hulls". Hazegray.org. 14 December 1998. Archived from the original on 19 November 2021.
- Maksel, Rebecca (14 August 2012). "How Do You Name an Aircraft Carrier?". Air & Space/Smithsonian.

=== Bibliography ===
- Adcock, Al (1996), Escort Carriers in Action - Warships No. 9, Carrollton, Texas: Squadron/Signal Publications, ISBN 9780897473569
- Chesneau, Robert; Gardiner, Robert (1980), Conway's All the World's Fighting Ships 1922–1946, London, England: Naval Institute Press, ISBN 9780870219139
- Friedman, Norman (1983), U.S. Aircraft Carriers: An Illustrated Design History, Annapolis, Maryland: Naval Institute Press, ISBN 9780870217395
- Ross, Al (1993), The Escort Carrier Gambier Bay, Anatomy of the Ship, London, England: Conway Maritime Press, ISBN 9781557502353
- Y'Blood, William (2012), The Little Giants: U.S. Escort Carriers Against Japan, Annapolis, Maryland: Naval Institute Press, ISBN 9781612512471
