= Uniflow =

Uniflow may refer to:

- UniFlow (Fire Show and Circus Performance Show Group)
- Uniflow diesel engine
- Uniflow steam engine
- UniFLOW Output Manager (Printing software)
