= USS Astrolabe Bay =

Two ships of the United States Navy have been named Astrolabe Bay. Navy records explain the name as a "bay in Alaska" but Astrolabe Bay fails to appear on contemporary maps. What the ship-namers perhaps had in mind was an Astrolabe Point on the mainland of Alaska, between what was then known as Cross Sound and Lituya Bay.

- USS Astrolabe Bay (ACV-60), was an auxiliary aircraft carrier, laid down on 5 January 1943. She was renamed Guadalcanal on 3 April 1943.
- USS Astrolabe Bay (CVE-97), was renamed Hollandia on 30 May 1944.
