= B15 =

B15 or B-15 may refer to:

- B15 (New York City bus), a New York City bus line
- Ampeg Portaflex B-15 bass amplifier, introduced in 1960
- HLA-B15, an HLA-B serotype
- Iceberg B-15, the largest iceberg on record as of 2006
- London Buses route B15
- Pangamic acid, commonly referred to as B15
- Boeing XB-15, a U.S. bomber
- Bundesstraße 15, a German road
- Boron-15 (B-15 or ^{15}B), an isotope of boron
- One of the ECO codes for the Caro–Kann Defence in chess
- Nissan Sentra chassis code, years 2000–2006
- A nickname for Brandon Marshall, Denver Broncos wide receiver
- LNER Class B15, a class of 20 British steam locomotives
