= B13 =

B13 may refer to:

- 130 mm/50 B13 Pattern 1936, Soviet naval gun
- B13 (New York City bus) serving Brooklyn
- B13tech, a futuristic fictional technology created by the character Brainiac 13
- Bensen B-13, a Bensen aircraft
- Boston Thirteens, a Rugby League club competing in the USARL
- District B13, a movie featuring David Belle
- HLA-B13, an HLA-B serotype
- Martin XB-13, a version of the Martin B-10 bomber
- Caro–Kann Defence, Exchange Variation (ECO code: B13), an opening in the game of chess
- Moseley, a suburb of Birmingham, England, from its postcode
- Orotic acid, formerly known as Vitamin B_{13}
- Boron-13 (B-13 or ^{13}B), an isotope of boron
- A chassis of the Nissan Sentra
- Queensland B13 class locomotive
- 13 amp, type B – a standard circuit breaker current rating
- Jalan Uniten–Dengkil, in Selangor, Malaysia
- LNER Class B13, a class of British steam locomotives
- Block 13, Kuwaiti TV Series

== See also ==
- 13B (disambiguation)
