= USS Elliot (DD-146) =

Wickes-class destroyer

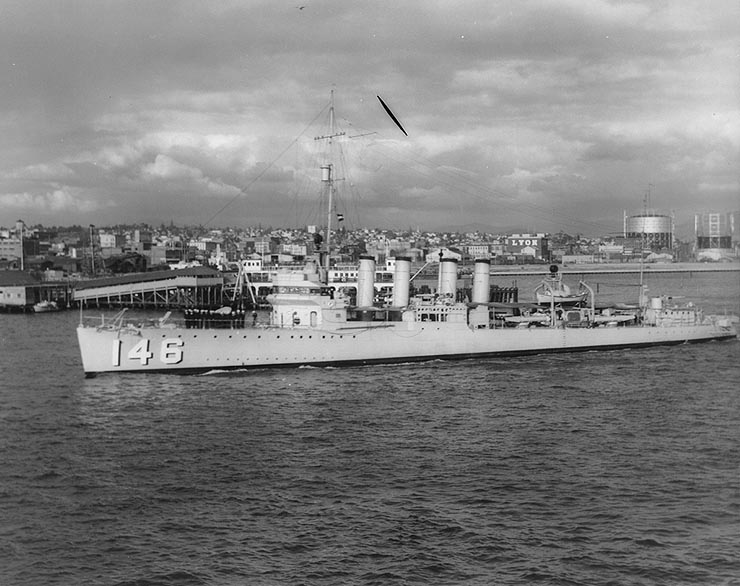
- Elliot, underway in San Diego harbor

History

United States
- Name: Elliot
- Builder: William Cramp & Sons, Philadelphia
- Yard number: 461
- Laid down: 23 February 1918
- Launched: 4 July 1918
- Commissioned: 25 January 1919
- Decommissioned: 22 May 1922
- Identification: DD-146
- Recommissioned: 8 February 1930
- Decommissioned: 12 October 1945
- Reclassified: DMS-4, 19 November 1940; AG-104, 5 June 1945
- Stricken: 25 October 1945
- Fate: Sold for scrap, 29 January 1946

General characteristics
- Class & type: Wickes-class destroyer
- Displacement: 1,090 tons
- Length: 314 ft 5 in (95.8 m)
- Beam: 31 ft 8 in (9.7 m)
- Draft: 8 ft 8 in (2.6 m)
- Speed: 35 knots (65 km/h)
- Complement: 101 officers and enlisted
- Armament: 4 × single 4 in (102 mm) guns; 2 × single 3 in (76 mm) guns; 4 × triple 21 in (533 mm) torpedo tubes

USS Elliot (DD-146) was a Wickes-class destroyer in the United States Navy during World War II, first reclassified as DMS-4, and later reclassified as AG-104.

== Namesake ==
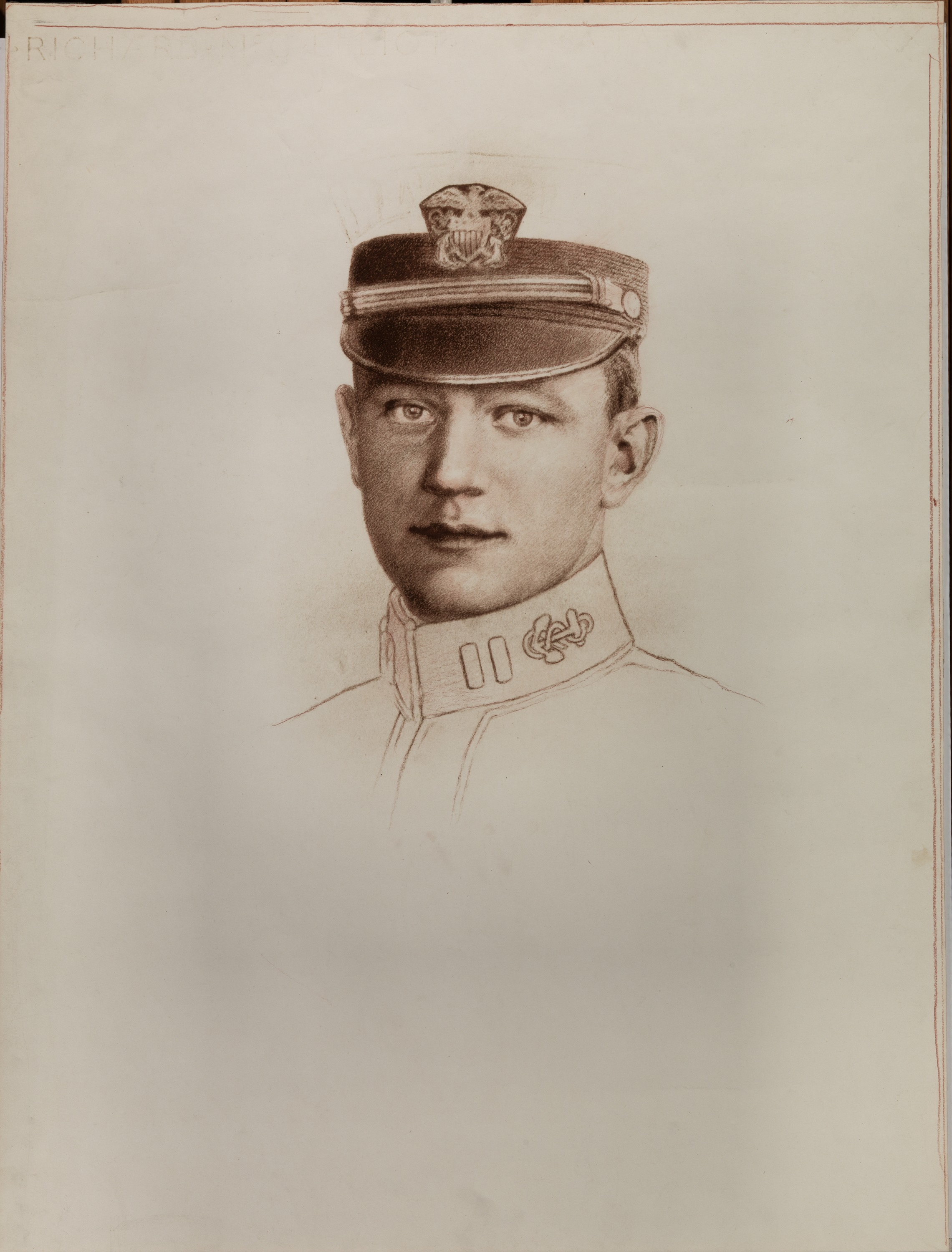
Richard M. Elliot Jr.

Richard McCall Elliot Jr. was born on 12 April 1888 in Philadelphia, Pennsylvania. He graduated from the United States Naval Academy on 10 July 1909. Lieutenant commander Elliot was killed aboard USS Manley on 19 March 1918 when her depth charges exploded in collision with a British ship in the convoy Manley was escorting.

== Construction and commissioning ==
Elliot was launched on 4 July 1918 by William Cramp & Sons at Philadelphia, sponsored by Mrs. R. M. Elliot, widow of Lieutenant Commander Elliot. The destroyer was commissioned on 25 January 1919.

== Service history ==
After training in the Caribbean Sea, Elliot sailed from New York on 28 April 1919 to the Azores; Gibraltar; Malta; and Split, returning to Philadelphia on 4 June. Reassigned to the Pacific Fleet, she joined Destroyer Division 13 in New York Harbor in welcoming George Washington carrying President Woodrow Wilson back from the peace conference at Paris, then departed for the west coast, arriving at San Diego on 7 August where she was reviewed by Secretary of the Navy Josephus Daniels.

Elliot maneuvered offshore with the fleet until 25 March 1920 when she departed for the Far East. In June, she took Admiral Albert Cleaves, Commander-in-Chief, Asiatic Fleet, aboard and sailed up the Yangtze to investigate the murder of an American missionary, William A. Reimert. She stood by in China during civil disturbances which threatened American lives and property. In September, she visited Port Arthur and Dalian on intelligence duty, and then returned to her base at Cavite for overhaul. Elliot went home to San Francisco in late 1921. In October, she arrived at San Diego to lie in reserve until being decommissioned on 22 May 1922.

Recommissioned on 8 February 1930, Elliot ranged the west coast with Destroyer Division 11 as plane guard in battle practice and major fleet problems. In early 1934, she sailed for the east coast and a two-ocean fleet problem.

Elliot was assigned new duty in 1935 when she became high-speed towing vessel for fleet targets. From 1937, she was also continuously available for training and experimental services. In 1940, she accompanied the Eclipse Expedition to Muleje, Baja California, and then was assigned to Pearl Harbor. She was converted to a high-speed minesweeper, and reclassified DMS-4 on 19 November 1940.

=== World War II ===
In exercises with Mine Division 6, Elliot often got as far as Hawaii. When the Japanese attacked Pearl Harbor on 7 December 1941, she was returning to her base with TF 3 from Johnston Island, and at once began anti-submarine patrol duties there.

Elliot continued to patrol in Hawaii until 11 July 1942, when she sailed for the Aleutians. She joined TG 8.6 for bombardment of Kiska on 7 August, and then took up patrol and escort work. In May 1943, she swept mines before and during invasion of Attu.

Reporting to Operational Training Command at San Francisco in June, Elliot served at San Diego, towing targets and serving as a training ship until 13 August 1944. Sailing to Pearl Harbor, she had similar duty until 22 July 1945, and then she returned to San Pedro for inactivation. She had been reclassified AG-104 on 5 June 1945. Elliot was decommissioned on 12 October 1945, and sold for scrap on 29 January 1946.

== Awards ==
Elliot received one battle star for World War II service.
