= USS Hollandia =

Casablanca-class escort carrier of the US Navy

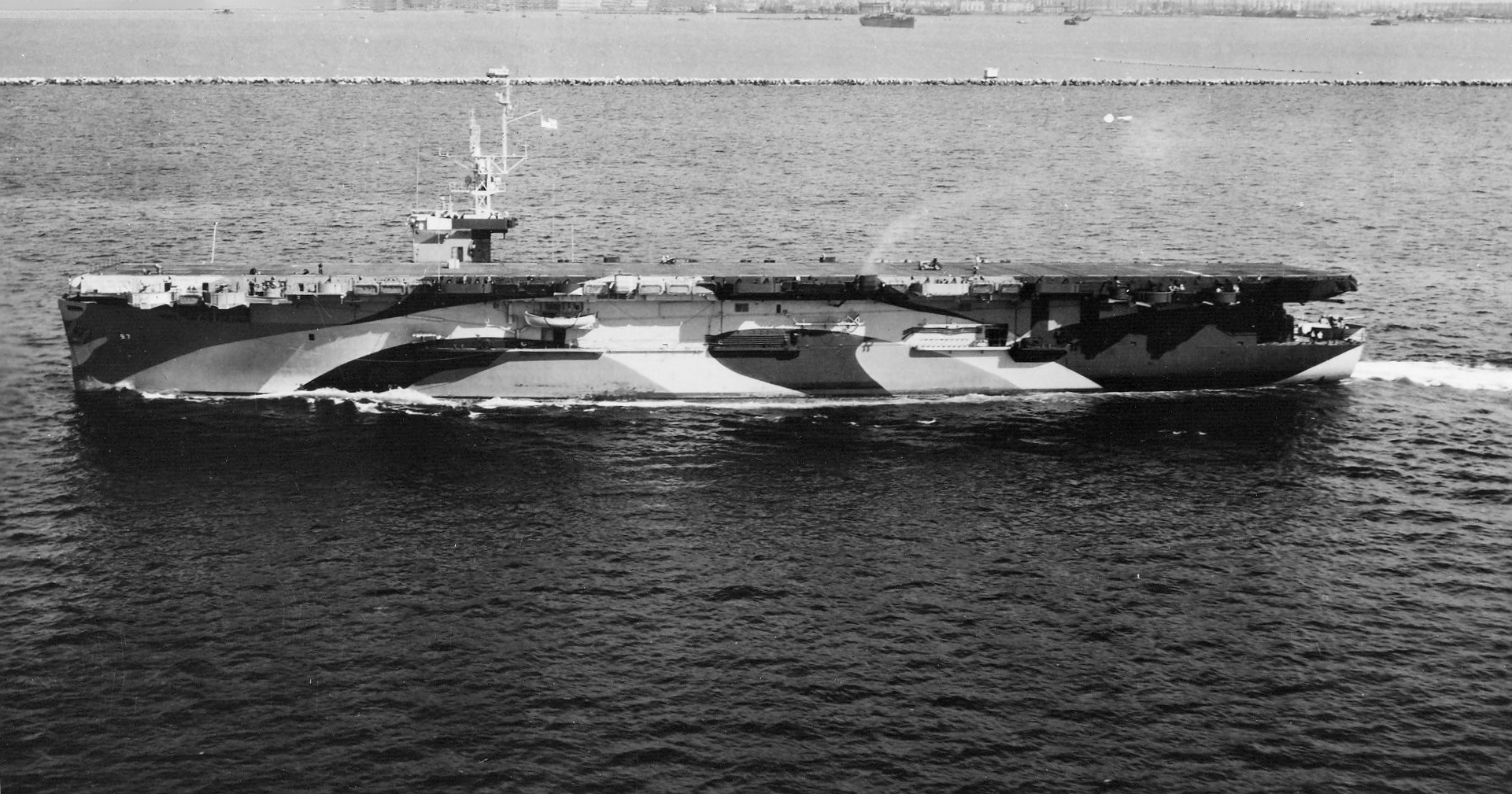
- USS Hollandia (CVE-97), underway, c. 1944

History

United States
- Name: Astrolabe Bay (1944); Hollandia (1944–1960)
- Namesake: Astrolabe Bay, Glacier Bay Basin, Alaska; Battle of Hollandia
- Ordered: as a Type S4-S2-BB3 hull, MCE hull 1134
- Awarded: 18 June 1942
- Builder: Kaiser Shipyards
- Laid down: 12 February 1944
- Launched: 28 April 1944
- Commissioned: 1 June 1944
- Decommissioned: 17 January 1947
- Stricken: 1 April 1960
- Identification: Hull symbol: CVE-97
- Honors and awards: 2 Battle stars
- Fate: Sold for scrap, July 1960

General characteristics
- Class & type: Casablanca-class escort carrier
- Displacement: 8,188 long tons (8,319 t) (standard); 10,902 long tons (11,077 t) (full load)
- Length: 512 ft 3 in (156.13 m) (oa); 490 ft (150 m) (wl); 474 ft (144 m) (fd)
- Beam: 65 ft 2 in (19.86 m); 108 ft (33 m) (extreme width)
- Draft: 20 ft 9 in (6.32 m) (max)
- Installed power: 4 × Babcock & Wilcox boilers; 9,000 shp (6,700 kW)
- Propulsion: 2 × Skinner Unaflow reciprocating steam engines; 2 × screws
- Speed: 19 knots (35 km/h; 22 mph)
- Range: 10,240 nmi (18,960 km; 11,780 mi) at 15 kn (28 km/h; 17 mph)
- Complement: Total: 910 – 916 officers and men; Embarked Squadron: 50 – 56; Ship's Crew: 860
- Armament: As designed: 1 × 5 in (127 mm)/38 cal dual-purpose gun; 4 × twin 40 mm (1.57 in) Bofors anti-aircraft guns; 12 × 20 mm (0.79 in) Oerlikon anti-aircraft cannons; Varied, ultimate armament: 1 × 5 in (127 mm)/38 cal dual-purpose gun; 8 × twin 40 mm (1.57 in) Bofors anti-aircraft guns; 20 × 20 mm (0.79 in) Oerlikon anti-aircraft cannons
- Aircraft carried: 27
- Aviation facilities: 1 × catapult; 2 × elevators

Service record
- Part of: United States Pacific Fleet (1944-1946); Pacific Reserve Fleet (1946-1960)
- Operations: Battle of Okinawa; Operation Magic Carpet

USS Hollandia (CVE-97) was a Casablanca-class escort carrier of the United States Navy. She was named after the Battle of Hollandia, a successful amphibious operation during the New Guinea campaign. Launched in April 1944, and commissioned in June, she served in support of the Battle of Okinawa. Postwar, she participated in Operation Magic Carpet. She was decommissioned in January 1947, when she was mothballed in the Pacific Reserve Fleet. Ultimately, she was sold for scrap in December 1960.

== Design and description ==
A side profile of the design of Thetis Bay.

Hollandia was a Casablanca-class escort carrier, the most numerous type of aircraft carriers ever built. Built to stem heavy losses during the Battle of the Atlantic, they came into service in late 1943, by which time the U-boat threat was already in retreat. Although some did see service in the Atlantic, the majority were utilized in the Pacific, ferrying aircraft, providing logistics support, and conducting close air support for the island-hopping campaigns. The Casablanca-class carriers were built on the standardized Type S4-S2-BB3 hull, a lengthened variant of the Doyen-class hull, and specifically designed to be mass-produced using welded prefabricated sections. This allowed them to be produced at unprecedented speeds: the final ship of her class, Munda, was delivered to the Navy just 101 days after the laying of her keel.

Hollandia was 512 ft 3 in (156.13 m) long overall (490 ft (150 m) at the waterline), had a beam of 65 ft 2 in (19.86 m), and a draft of 20 ft 9 in (6.32 m). She displaced 8,188 long tons (8,319 t) standard, which increased to 10,902 long tons (11,077 t) with a full load. To carry out flight operations, the ship had a 257 ft (78 m) hangar deck and a 474 ft (144 m) flight deck. Her compact size necessitated the installation of an aircraft catapult at her bow, and there were two aircraft elevators to facilitate movement of aircraft between the flight and hangar deck: one each fore and aft.

She was powered by four Babcock & Wilcox Express D boilers that raised 285 psi (1,970 kPa) of steam at 577 °F (303 °C). The steam generated by these boilers fed two Skinner Unaflow reciprocating steam engines, delivering 9,000 hp (6,700 kW) to two propeller shafts. This allowed her to reach speeds of 19 kn (35 km/h; 22 mph), with a cruising range of 10,240 nmi (18,960 km; 11,780 mi) at 15 kn (28 km/h; 17 mph). For armament, one 5 in (127 mm)/38 caliber dual-purpose gun was mounted on the stern. Additional anti-aircraft defense was provided by eight Bofors 40 mm (1.57 in) anti-aircraft guns in single mounts and twelve Oerlikon 20 mm (0.79 in) cannons mounted around the perimeter of the deck. By 1945, Casablanca-class carriers had been modified to carry twenty Oerlikon cannons and sixteen Bofors guns; the doubling of the latter was accomplished by putting them into twin mounts. Sensors onboard consisted of a SG surface-search radar and a SK air-search radar.

Although Casablanca-class escort carriers were intended to function with a crew of 860 and an embarked squadron of 50 to 56, the exigencies of wartime often necessitated the inflation of the crew count. They were designed to operate with 27 aircraft, but the hangar deck could accommodate much more during transport or training missions.

== Construction ==
The escort carrier was laid down on 12 February 1944, under a Maritime Commission contract, MC hull 1134, by Kaiser Shipbuilding Company, Vancouver, Washington. She was laid down and launched under the name Astrolabe Bay, as part of a tradition which named escort carriers after bays or sounds in Alaska. She was renamed Hollandia on 30 May 1944, as part of a new naval policy which named subsequent Casablanca-class carriers after naval or land engagements. She was launched on 28 April 1944; sponsored by Mrs. William H. Wheat; transferred to the United States Navy and commissioned on 1 June 1944.

== Service history ==
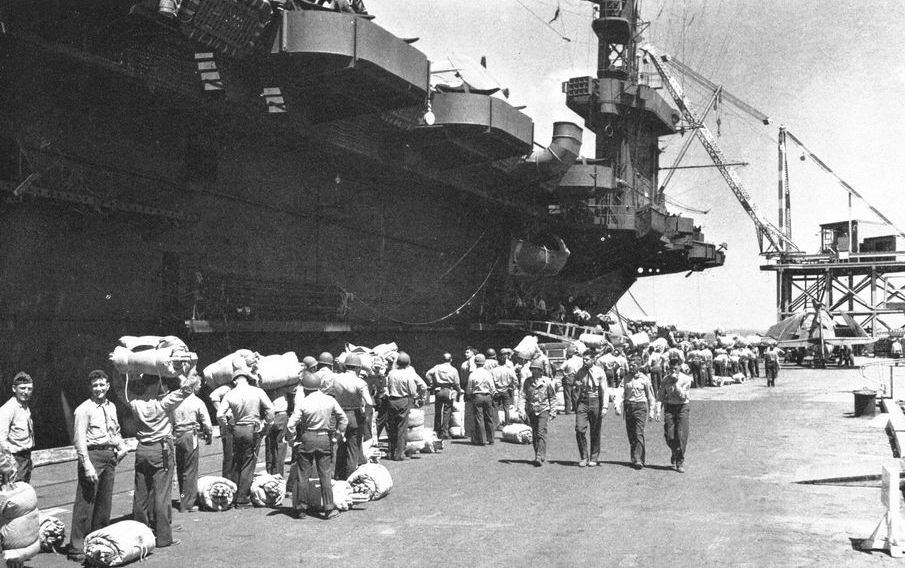
Hollandia anchored at San Diego, July 1944. Passengers are waiting to board the ship.

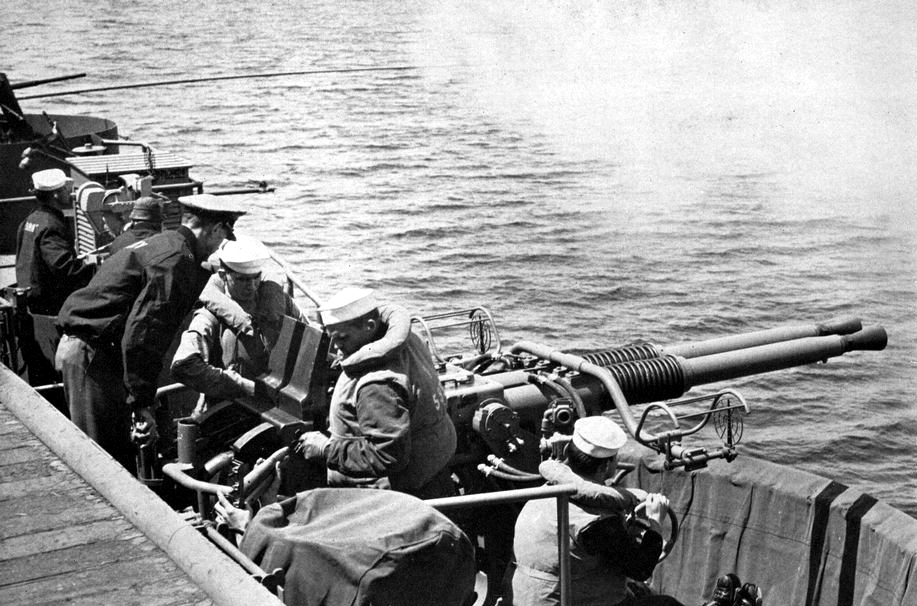
Gunnery practice onboard Hollandia, circa 1944.

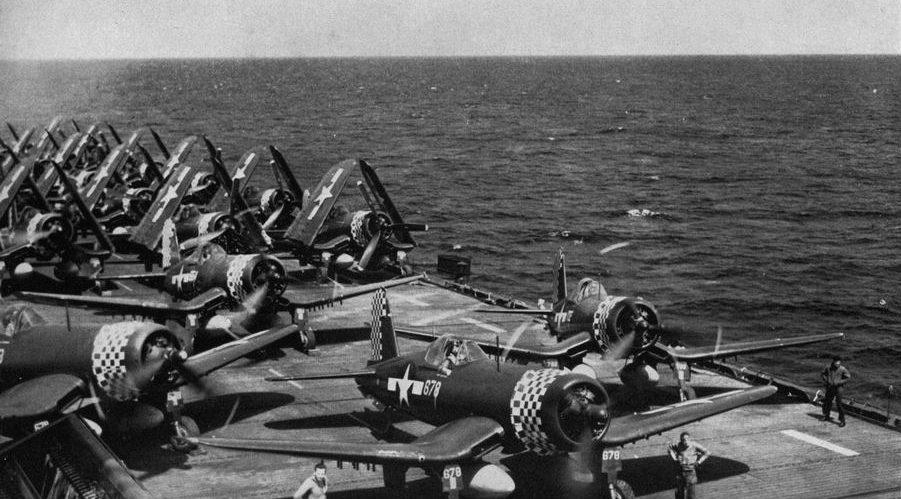
F4U Corsairs of Marine Fighter Attack Squadron 312 prepare to take off from the flight deck of Hollandia, April 1945.

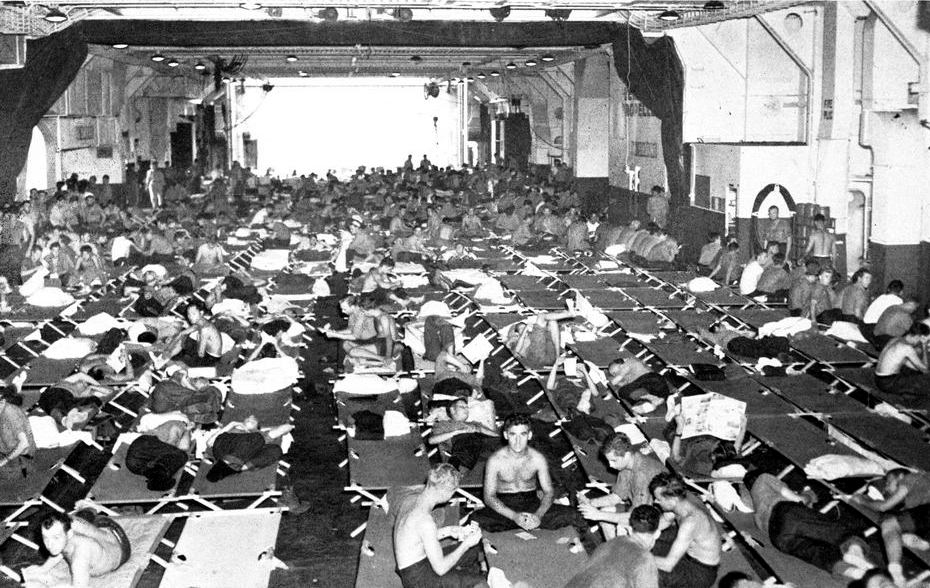
The hangar deck of Hollandia during a Magic Carpet run, circa 1945.

Upon being commissioned, Hollandia underwent a shakedown cruise down the West Coast to San Diego. Shakedown continued as she underwent a transport mission, carrying a load of replacement aircraft and military personnel. She departed on 10 July, bound for Espiritu Santo. On her return trip, she stopped at Manus and Guadalcanal, before arriving at Port Hueneme, California on 27 August. For the next few months, Hollandia continued these transport missions to the West and South Pacific, transporting supplies and passengers.

She continued these duties until 1 April 1945, at which point she was anchored at Ulithi. As U.S. forces began their landings, beginning the Battle of Okinawa, Hollandia joined the Special Escort Carrier Group as its flagship. She, along with White Plains, Sitkoh Bay, and the Bogue-class escort carrier Breton, transported Marine Air Groups 31 and 33 to land bases captured on Okinawa. In total, the air group being transported consisted of 192 Vought F4U Corsair and 30 Grumman F6F Hellcat fighters. Hollandia was delegated to take on the planes of Marine Air Group 33. After departing on 2 April, the destroyers Kilty, Manley, George E. Badger, and Greene provided a screen for the carriers.

The escort carriers managed to safely arrive at Okinawa on 6 April, although the destroyers dropped depth charges to deter a suspected submarine en route. There, Hollandia prepared to begin launching her aircraft, which would be the first land-based aircraft to support the U.S. forces fighting their way down the island. However, she, along with White Plains, were ordered to postpone their launchings for several days, as the transport ships ferrying the equipment of the marines had been attacked and damaged, with much equipment lost. On 9 April, she launched her planes to the hastily expanded Kadena Air Base, where the aircraft began operations. Marine Fighter Attack Squadron 323, transported aboard the escort carriers, would go on to become the highest-scoring air unit participating in the Battle of Okinawa, claiming 124.5 Japanese planes.

Having completed her duties, she returned to San Diego, arriving on 1 May. Whilst at port, Captain John Thompson Brown Jr. took over command of the vessel. She then conducted a transport run to Pearl Harbor, ferrying cargo and passengers. On 7 June, she departed the West Coast to serve as a replenishment carrier, supporting the Fast Carrier Task Force in its operations against Japan. Replenishment carriers enabled the frontline carriers to replace battle losses, and to stay at sea for longer durations of time. Hollandia loaded replacement aircraft at Pearl Harbor, and she sailed on 18 June to join Task Group 30.8, the Fleet Oiler and Transport Carrier Group (also known as the At Sea Logistics Service Group). She provided replacement aircraft up until news of the Japanese surrender broke.

Post-war, Hollandia berthed at Guam, where an overhaul was conducted to transform her into a passenger ship. She then joined the Operation Magic Carpet fleet, which repatriated U.S. servicemen from around the Pacific. She conducted four Magic Carpet runs, before heading to San Pedro, where she was released from the Magic Carpet fleet. She departed Southern California on 4 February 1946, bound for Puget Sound, and upon arriving on 15 February, she underwent inactivation. The ship was decommissioned on 17 January 1947, and mothballed as part of the Pacific Reserve Fleet. Whilst mothballed, she was redesignated as a utility aircraft carrier, CVU-97, on 12 June 1955. The hull was then once again redesignated, this time as an aircraft transport, AKV-33, on 7 May 1959. Finally, her hull was struck from the Navy list on 1 April 1960, and sold sometime in July 1960 to Eisenberg & Co. of New York for scrapping. Her ultimate fate was to be broken up in Japan during November 1960.

== Sources ==
=== Online sources ===
- "Hollandia (CVE-97)". Dictionary of American Naval Fighting Ships. Naval History and Heritage Command. 27 April 2016. Archived from the original on 4 June 2019. This article incorporates text from this source, which is in the public domain.
- "Kaiser Vancouver, Vancouver WA". www.ShipbuildingHistory.com. 27 November 2010. Archived from the original on 16 June 2019.
- "World Aircraft Carriers List: US Escort Carriers, S4 Hulls". Hazegray.org. 14 December 1998. Archived from the original on 19 November 2021.
- Maksel, Rebecca (14 August 2012). "How Do You Name an Aircraft Carrier?". Air & Space/Smithsonian.
- Stubblebine, Daniel (June 2011). "Escort Carrier Makin Island (CVE-93)". ww2db.com.
- "Commanding Officers of USS Hollandia (CVE-97)". NavSource.

=== Bibliography ===
- Adcock, Al (1996), Escort Carriers in Action - Warships No. 9, Carrollton, Texas: Squadron/Signal Publications, ISBN 9780897473569
- Chesneau, Robert; Gardiner, Robert (1980), Conway's All the World's Fighting Ships 1922–1946, London, England: Naval Institute Press, ISBN 9780870219139
- Friedman, Norman (1983), U.S. Aircraft Carriers: An Illustrated Design History, Annapolis, Maryland: Naval Institute Press, ISBN 9780870217395
- Ross, Al (1993), The Escort Carrier Gambier Bay, Anatomy of the Ship, London, England: Conway Maritime Press, ISBN 9781557502353
- Y'Blood, William (2012), The Little Giants: U.S. Escort Carriers Against Japan, Annapolis, Maryland: Naval Institute Press, ISBN 9781612512471
