= Bash valve =

A bash valve is a valve within a piston engine, used to control the admission of the working fluid. They are directly actuated valves, operated by contact between the piston and the valve tip.

Bash valves have the advantage of great simplicity, for manufacture and operation. Their disadvantages are that their opening and closing times are relatively crudely controlled, compared to other types of valve gear.

The valve is usually constructed as a circular poppet valve with a conical seat, inserted into the cylinder from the outside. A protrusion on the inside is hit by the piston as it approaches top dead centre, forcing the valve open.

Bash valves are usually held closed by the pressure of fluid in the reservoir behind them. There may be a light spring to assist closing when the reservoir is empty. For this reason they are used as inlet valves, not exhaust. An exhaust bash valve would have the cylinder pressure and the piston actuation both acting to open it, with nothing to close it.

== Steam engines ==
Bash valves are not widely used in steam engines, although they are known. Most examples were applied to some form of uniflow steam engine; unlike the more common slide and piston-valved engines with their bidirectional-flow ports, uniflow engines use inlet ports at the cylinder ends and an exhaust near the centre.

Although the opening time of a bash valve is fixed, imprecisely controlled and always occurs near top dead centre, this is not a major drawback for a steam engine. A more important requirement is the ability to accurately control the closing time of the valve, and for its duration to be adjustable in order to 'drive' the engine, according to varying load. Some designs of uniflow engine have used a combined mechanical and electromagnetic valve to do this. The valve is opened mechanically, then held by an electromagnet. This requires less electrical power to merely hold the valve than to open it. A patent for such an engine was granted to Sturtevant in 1968.

Advanced Uniflow Steam Engine Red = high-pressure steam, controlled by the electromagnetically retained bash valve.

The same idea has recently been revived as the main feature of an Advanced Uniflow Steam Engine. In this engine, a second valve is used for exhaust purposes in the later part of the cycle too, although this one is bashed shut, rather than opened.

Bash valves have also been used for the ad hoc conversion of commonplace petrol small engines, such as lawnmowers, into hobbyist steam engines. The original petrol engine sparkplug mounting hole is used as the location for a new piston-actuated bash valve, together with the original exhaust valve. Performance and efficiency are not a need of such projects.

== Pneumatic motors ==
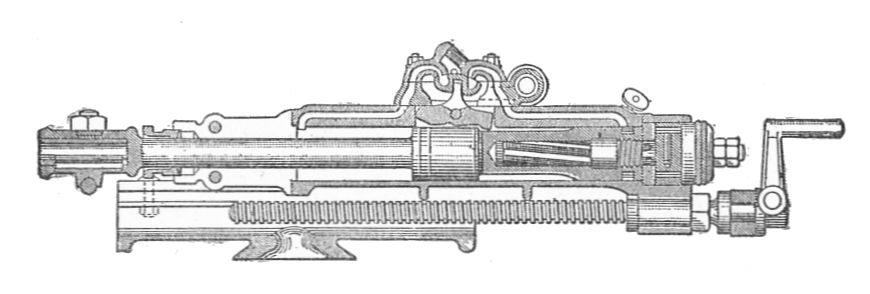
Pneumatic rock drill, with a bash valve above the working cylinder

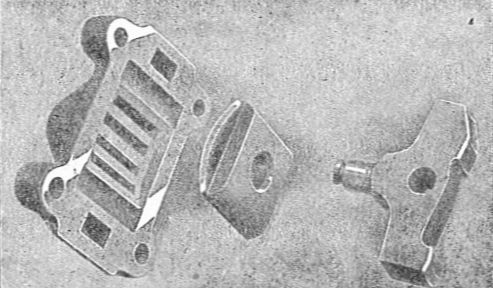
Valve chest, arc valve and tappet of a pneumatic rock drill

One successful application for bash valves has been to pneumatic motors. Owing to the characteristics of compressed air pneumatic power, their simplicity is valuable and their inefficiencies with other fluids are less important.

Compressed air is supplied cold to the motor. (Note: Although air becomes heated during compression, there is still little usable heat in the supplied air, compared to steam.) Energy is represented solely by the pressure of the air not, unlike steam, by the combination of pressure and temperature. Efficient operation of a steam engine relies upon expansion of the steam during the piston stroke, which relies upon accurate valve timing and an early closure of the valve. During the expansion phase of the steam it does not expand in a simple isothermal fashion, but does so adiabatically, much of the energy having been supplied as heat rather than pressure.

The compressed air motor is thermodynamically simpler. It uses simple isothermal expansion. (Note: Strictly this is an adiabatic expansion too, but it is approximately isothermal, at least compared to the steam engine.) This means that expansion is less important, valve timings are thus longer and less crucial and so a simple valve may be adequate.

To provide long opening times, the bash valve normally incorporates some form of tappet mechanism. Rather than a valve that is held open by the piston directly, the valve becomes double-acting and is opened by the piston's impact at one end of the stroke and closed by a further impact at the other end of the stroke. The tappet and valve are commonly separate, allowing the valve to remain in a well-defined fully open position throughout the stroke, however the tappet is bounced around by the piston.

Where a reciprocating action is produced, such as for a rock drill, the valve may be actuated either by inertia of the frame or by the movement of the working piston. As the piston hammers back and forth, it impacts a small tappet, which in turn moves the air valve and so reverses the flow of air to the piston. One form of this, the arc tappet valve, was an important feature of the Ingersoll rock drill, the first successful compressed air rock drill for use in mining and tunneling. This used a valve that rotated in a slight arc, rather than sliding. The valve was double-acting, controlling the air supply for both the power and the return stroke. The innovation that made this valve so reliable, thus successful, was a separate tappet that was actuated by the piston in passing at the middle of the stroke, rather than being hammered by a jarring direct impact of the piston. The mid-stroke actuation also opened the valve passageways earlier, before top dead centre, allowing in air that provided a cushioning effect. This further improved the action of the drill, giving a powerful stroke on the working piston and drill rod, but with less damaging hammering to the frame of the drill.

== Internal combustion engines ==
Bash valves are not used in such engines. The cylinder peak pressures of an Otto cycle engine are too high for such a valve to remain on its seat.

== Single-shot valves ==
Bash valves are also used in a 'single-shot' situation, where a valve is opened once and then remains open until the contents of a pressure vessel are released. Such valves are used in some fire extinguishers and pre-charged air rifles.

These valves are arranged so that once lifted off their seat, pressure underneath the valve becomes sufficient to keep the valve raised and so it remains open until the pressure reservoir is empty. The valve is then closed by a light spring.

== See also ==
- Valve gear
