= Hydraulic tappet =

Device in internal combustion engines

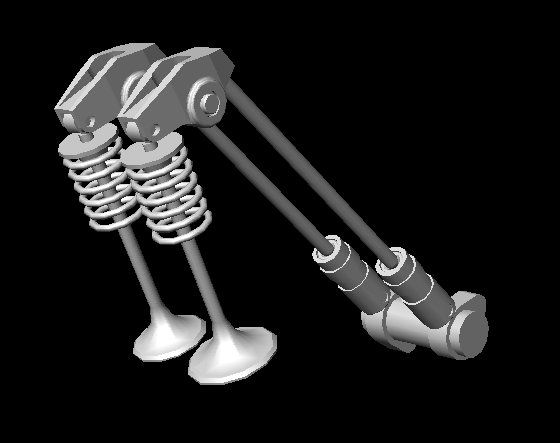
In an overhead valve engine the valve lifters are sandwiched between pushrods and the camshaft

A hydraulic tappet, also known as a hydraulic valve lifter or hydraulic lash adjuster, is a device for maintaining zero valve clearance in an internal combustion engine. Conventional solid valve lifters require regular adjusting to maintain a small clearance between the valve and its rocker or cam follower. This clearance prevents the parts from binding as they expand with the engine's heat, but can also lead to noisy operation and increased wear as the parts rattle against one another until they reach operating temperature. The hydraulic lifter was designed to compensate for this, allowing the valve train to operate with zero clearance at all operating temperatures once the oil is warm—leading to quieter operation, longer engine life, and eliminating the need for periodic adjustment of valve clearance. During operation, it fills with oil, which provides hydraulic resistance to compression, eliminating "play" (also known as "lash") from the system and creating an effective zero-tolerance system.

== Description ==
A valve lifter in an internal combustion engine is situated between the camshaft and each valve. A solid valve lifter is just that, in effect a metal spacer to transmit force and motion from the camshaft to the valvetrain). A hydraulic valve lifter is a hollow steel cylinder encasing an internal piston. The piston is held at the outer limit of its travel with a strong spring. The lobed camshaft rhythmically presses against the lifter, which transmits the motion to the engine valve in one of two ways:

1. through a pushrod which actuates the valve via a rocker mechanism (in an overhead valve (OHV) engine);
2. via direct contact with the valve stem or rocker arm (in an overhead camshaft (OHC) configuration).

Oil under constant pressure is supplied to the lifter via an oil channel, through a small hole in the lifter body. When the engine valve is closed (lifter in a neutral position), the lifter is free to fill with oil. As the camshaft lobe enters the lift phase of its travel, it compresses the lifter piston, and a check valve shuts the oil inlet. Oil is nearly incompressible, so this greater pressure renders the lifter effectively solid during the lift phase.

As the camshaft lobe travels through its apex, the load is reduced on the lifter piston, and the internal spring returns the piston to its neutral state so the lifter can refill with oil. This small range of travel in the lifter's piston is enough to eliminate the need for frequent lash adjustment.

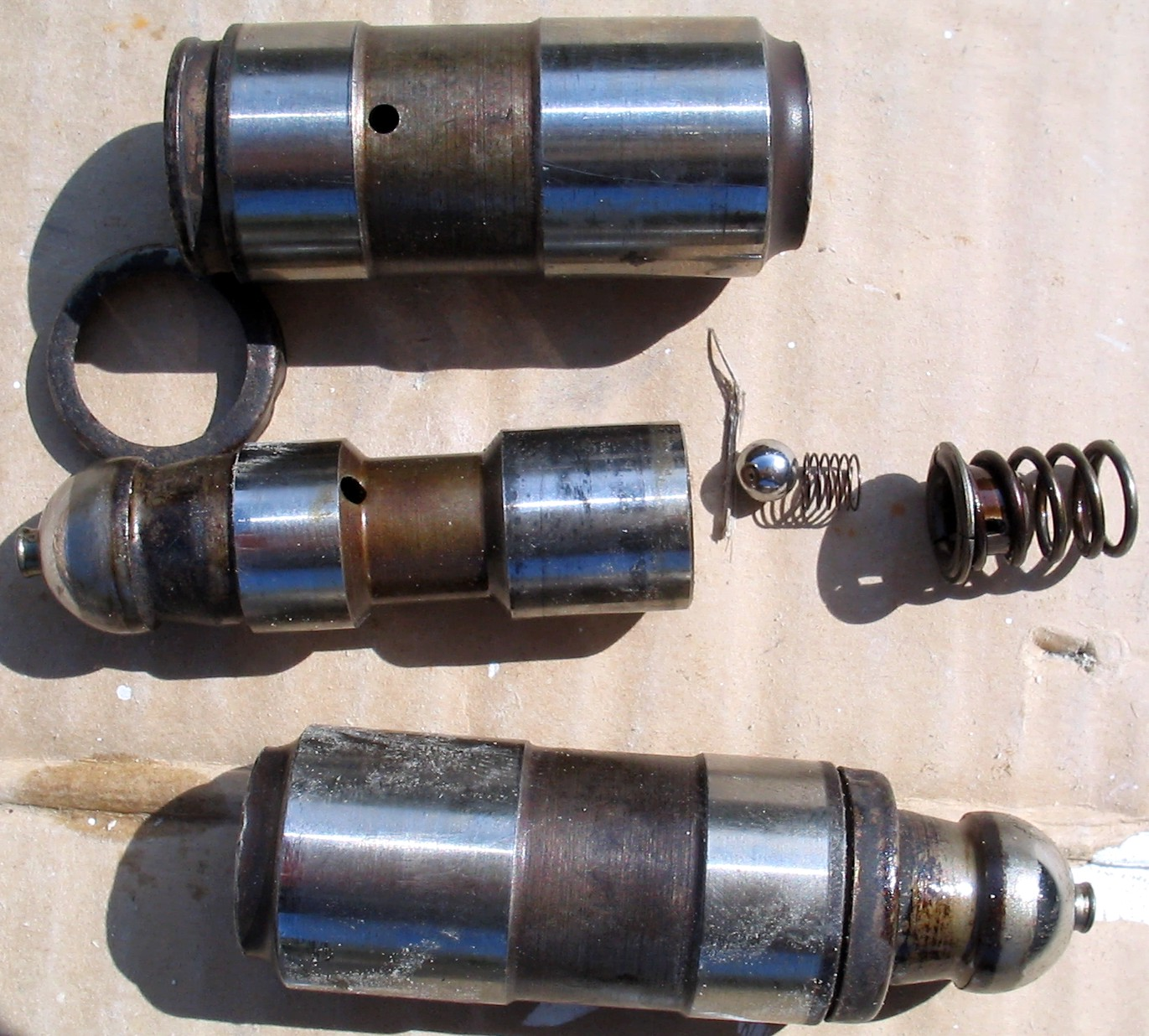
Hydraulic Tappet Parts

Hydraulic Tappet Cross Section

== History ==
The first engine to feature hydraulic lifters was the 1930 Cadillac V16 (Model 452). Hydraulic lifters were nearly universal on cars designed in the 1980s, but some newer cars have reverted to bucket-and-shim mechanical lifters. Although these do not run as quietly and are not maintenance-free, they are cheaper. Nearly all modern non-hydraulic lifter arrangements are on overhead cam engines.

== Advantages ==
As the whole process is actuated by hydraulic pressure at engine start, there is no need for service or adjustment. Another advantage is cheaper operation, as there is no need for service and charges associated with tappet maintenance. Usually hydraulic tappets survive through the whole of the engine life without any service requirements.

== Disadvantages ==
Noisy hydraulic tappet

Quiet hydraulic tappet

There are a number of potential problems with hydraulic lifters. Frequently, the valvetrain will rattle loudly on startup due to oil draining from the lifters when the vehicle is parked. This is not considered a significant issue provided the noise disappears within a couple of minutes; typically it lasts only a second or two. A rattle that does not go away can indicate a blocked oil feed, or that one or more of the lifters has collapsed due to wear and is no longer opening its valve fully. The affected lifter should be replaced in the latter situation.

Hydraulic tappets require more complex and more expensive cylinder head design. A number of subcompact car manufacturers prefer solid valve lifters due to lower design and production cost rather than hydraulic tappets.

Generally, hydraulic tappets are more sensitive to engine oil quality and frequency of oil changes, as carbon sludge and residues may easily lock up the tappets or block oil channels, making the clearance setting ineffective. This has negative impact, especially on the engine camshaft and valves due to excessive wear if the clearance setting is not working correctly. As mentioned, one may avoid this by using the manufacturer-recommended grade of engine oil, and by not exceeding the prescribed oil change interval.

It is a myth that in certain circumstances, a lifter can "pump up" and create negative valve clearance. The engine oil pump cannot generate enough pressure to cause "pump-up". The problem is due to weak valve springs which permit float at high engine speeds. The followers attempt to take up what they see as extra clearance. As this speed is maintained, the lifter will continue to expand until the valve is held off its seat when it should be closed. Maintenance of the valve springs at the correct strength is therefore very important to avoid engine damage.

Hydraulic lifters can also create "valve bounce" or "flutter" at high RPM, which is undesirable for performance uses.

== Notes ==
Used hydraulic lifters should be drained of oil before installation, to prevent them from holding open the valves on startup and potentially causing damage to the valve-train/pistons. This is easily accomplished by compressing them in a vise. Oil pressure will build quickly upon startup and they will set themselves to the proper height.
