= Johann Stumpf (engineer) =

German engineer (1862–1936)

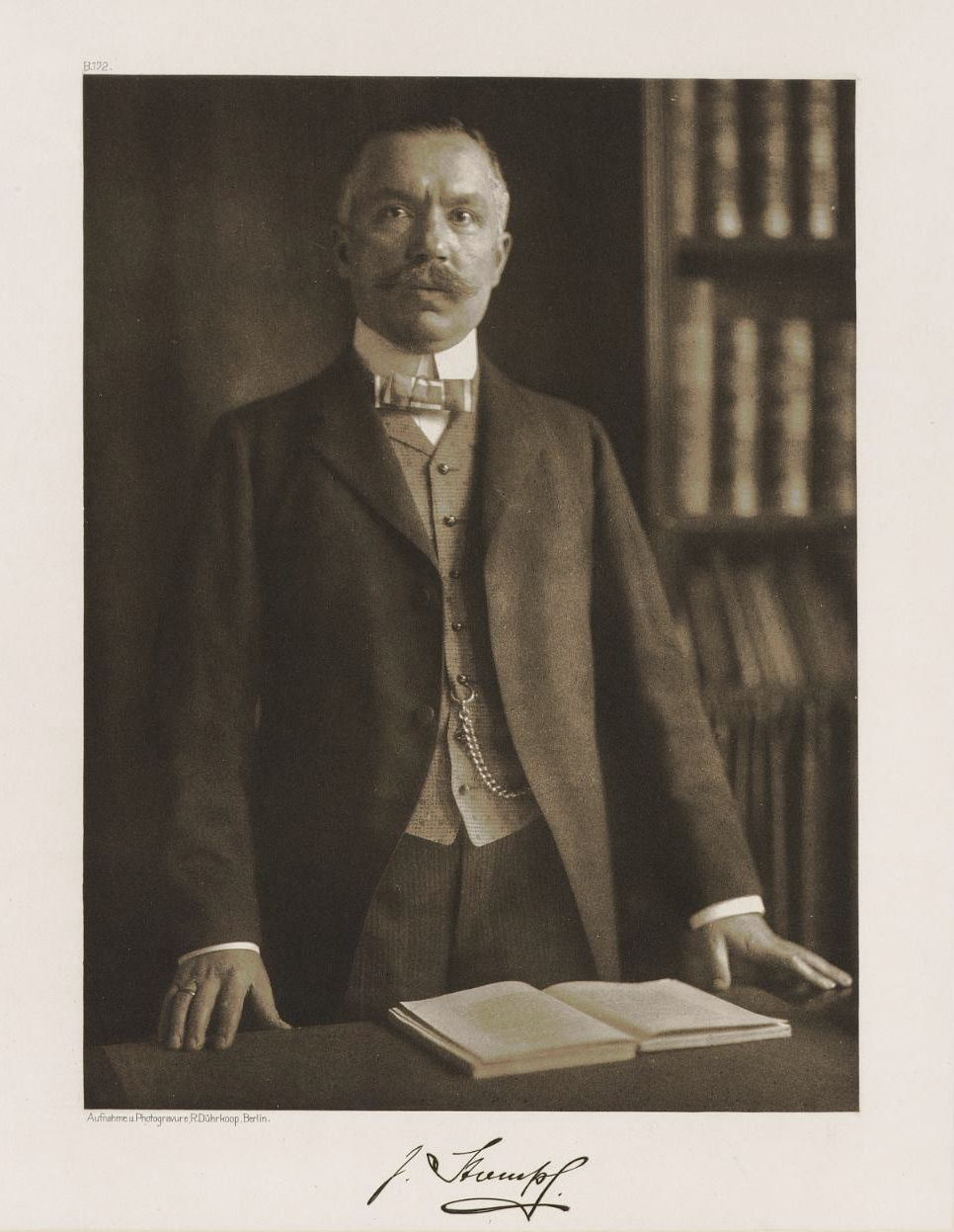
Johann Stumpf

Johann Stumpf of Technische Hochschule Charlottenburg (today Technische Universität Berlin) is best known for popularising the uniflow steam engine, in the years around 1909, and his name has always been associated with it. The basic uniflow principle had been invented many years before.

== Idea ==
Stumpf's 'Uniflow' system aroused interest among engine designers in the years before the First World War, at first in his native Germany and later elsewhere. The Uniflow principle was known previously, and Stumpf's work was really its practical application. In Stumpf's system steam was admitted at one end of the cylinder, and the used steam left through a ring of ports at the other end of the cylinder. This allowed the admission end to stay hot, as it was not cooled by the exhaust on its way out, and so improved efficiency. In a double-acting engine the exhaust ports were in the middle of the cylinder.

Almost all uniflow engines were large stationary types, but the system was tried by, among others, the North Eastern Railway in England, as described by Tuplin (see sources). Briefly, the system worked well and obtained a small increase in economy by decreasing fuel consumption, but at the price structure prevailing at that time the extra constructional and maintenance costs were greater than the coal economy. H.W. Dickinson's A Short History of The Steam Engine makes it clear that the concept of the uniflow engine reached back to Montgolfier and Jacob Perkins (who patented the idea) and Leonard Jennett Todd (Patent No. 7801): Dickinson then gives Stumpf of Technische Hochschule Charlottenburg his due citing a paper by T.B. Perry Proc. Inst. Mech. Eng., 1920 (1922?).

== Patents ==
- 5429/1908 Application (original: 7 March 1908), UK 6 March 1909, Accepted 15 July 1909. Improvements in four-cylinder locomotive engines
- 25,531/1910 Application 3 November 1910, Accepted 2 March 1911. Improvements relating to manoeuvring and like gear for uni-directional flow steam engines
- 16,442 /1910 Application (original: 5 March 1910) 9 July 1910, Accepted 23 March 1911. Improvements relating to valves
- 16,383/1910 Application (original: 18 June 1910) 8 July 1910, Accepted 20 October 1910. Improvements relating to uni-directional flow steam engines

== Sources ==
- The Unaflow steam engine. 1912 (translated Stumpf Uniflow Engine Co., Syracuse (NY))
- Tuplin, W.A. (1970). "North Eastern Steam". Transactions of the Newcomen Society. XLIII.
