= 13B =

13B may refer to:

- 13B: Fear Has a New Address or Yavarum Nalam, a 2009 Indian horror film
- Boron-13 (^{13}B), an isotope of boron
- A Mazda Wankel engine
- A Toyota B engine
- Section 13b of the Securities Exchange Act of 1934

== See also ==
- B13 (disambiguation)
