= USS Manley (DD-74) =

Caldwell-class destroyer

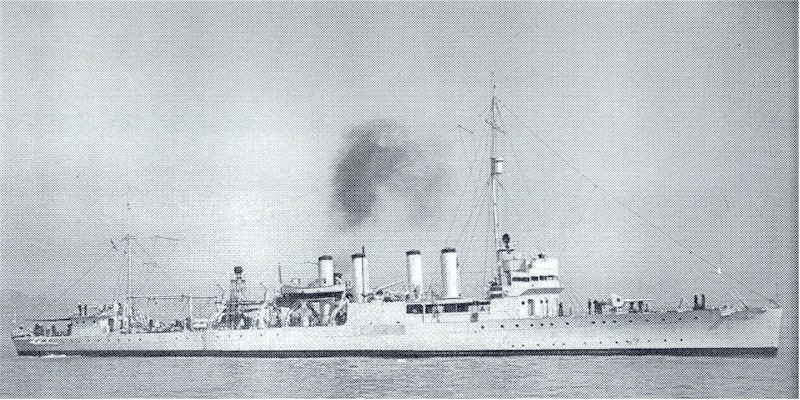
- USS Manley

History

United States
- Name: Manley
- Builder: Bath Iron Works
- Laid down: 22 August 1916
- Launched: 23 August 1917
- Commissioned: 15 October 1917
- Decommissioned: 14 June 1922
- Recommissioned: 1 May 1930
- Decommissioned: 19 November 1945
- Reclassified: DD-74 (Destroyer), 17 July 1920; AG-28 (Miscellaneous Auxiliary), 28 November 1938; APD-1 (High-speed Transport), 2 August 1940; DD-74, 25 June 1945
- Stricken: 5 December 1945
- Honors and awards: 5 battle stars & Navy Unit Commendation (World War II)
- Fate: Sold for scrapping, 26 November 1946

General characteristics
- Class & type: Caldwell-class destroyer
- Displacement: 1,125 long tons (1,143 t)
- Length: 315 ft 6 in (96.16 m)
- Beam: 31 ft 3 in (9.53 m)
- Draft: 8 ft 1 in (2.46 m)
- Speed: 30 knots (56 km/h; 35 mph)
- Complement: 100 officers and enlisted
- Armament: 4 × 4 in (102 mm) guns; 2 × 1-pounder guns; 2 × .30 cal (7.62 mm) machine guns; 12 × 21-inch (533 mm) torpedo tubes

USS Manley (DD-74/AG-28/APD-1), a Caldwell-class destroyer, served in the United States Navy. She was the second Navy ship named for Captain John Manley (c.1733–1793).

Manley was laid down on 22 August 1916 by the Bath Iron Works, Bath, Maine; launched on 23 August 1917; sponsored by Miss Dorothy S. Sewall; and commissioned on 15 October 1917. She was redesignated DD-74 on 17 July 1920.

== World War I ==
After fitting out in Boston Navy Yard, Manley sailed in company with Battleship Division Nine on 25 November 1917 to join the convoy escort and patrol forces based at Queenstown, Ireland. On the morning of 19 March 1918, while Manley escorted a convoy, she rolled against the British auxiliary cruiser HMS Montagua, which caused the accidental detonation of Manley's depth charges. Her stern was practically destroyed, and 33 enlisted men as well as her executive officer, Lt. Comdr. Richard M. Elliot Jr., were killed in the subsequent explosion. Fragments pierced two 50-US-gallon (190 L; 42 imp gal) drums of gasoline and two tanks containing 100 US gallons (380 L; 83 imp gal) of alcohol. The leaking fluids caught fire as they ran along the deck and enveloped the ship in flames which were not extinguished until late that night.

Then the Aubrietia-class sloop HMS Tamarisk edged up to the shattered destroyer and unsuccessfully tried to put a towline on board. Manley remained adrift until British tugs Blazer and Cartmel took her in tow after daylight on 20 March. She reached Queenstown at dusk the following day with more than 70 feet (21 m) of her hull awash or completely under water.

== Inter-war years ==
Manley completed repairs in Liverpool and sailed on 22 December 1918 for operations along the eastern seaboard of the United States. She got underway on 11 April 1919 to join U.S. Naval Forces in the Adriatic Sea transporting passengers, carrying mail, and performing diplomatic missions. In June 1919 she began carrying, mail and members of the U.S. Food Commission among Turkish ports in the Black Sea. The destroyer returned from the Mediterranean to New York on 1 August 1919 and decommissioned at Philadelphia, Pennsylvania on 14 June 1922.

The destroyer recommissioned on 1 May 1930 for service as an experimental torpedo-firing ship at Newport, Rhode Island. On 19 August 1930 she joined the Scouting Fleet in battle practice along the eastern seaboard and in the Caribbean. She performed similar duty on the coast of California out of San Diego during 1932. She returned to the Atlantic early in 1933 for operations which continued until she sailed for the Panama Canal Zone on 10 September 1935 and joined the Special Service Squadron that patrolled the Caribbean.

Manley sailed for Norfolk, Virginia on 1 February 1937 to join DesRon 10 in training midshipmen. On 26 October 1937 she sailed from Boston, Massachusetts with Claxton (DD-140) to serve with Squadron 40-T in protecting American interests in the Mediterranean during the Spanish Civil War. She operated principally from Villefranche, Naples, Algiers, and Tangiers until she departed Gibraltar on 29 October 1938, arriving Norfolk on 11 November 1938. Reclassified a miscellaneous auxiliary on 28 November, she was redesignated AG-28.

== As an auxiliary and high-speed transport ==
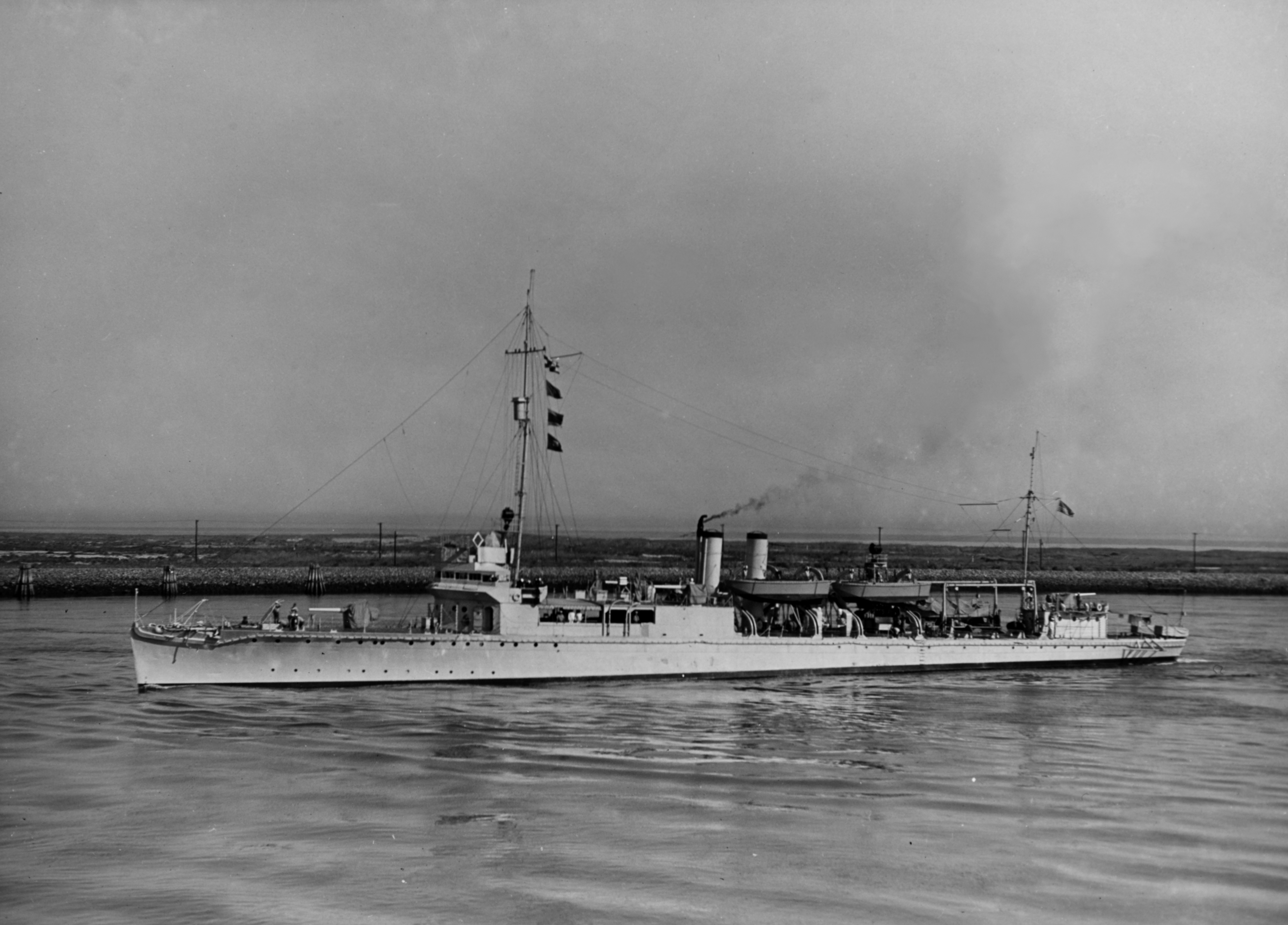
Manley after conversion to a high speed transport, 23 September 1940.

Manley was outfitted as a high-speed transport in the New York Navy Yard by 7 February 1939. Her first marine landing force drill was carried out on 21 February when she landed marines in Target Bay, Culebra Island in the first of many landing exercises on the Virginia and North Carolina beaches and in the Caribbean that would prove of great benefit to the United States in the vast overseas conflict then just over the horizon. Manley briefly visited the California coast in the spring of 1940 for marine landing force drills off Coronado Roads. Back in the Atlantic, Manley was officially designated the Navy's first high-speed transport on 2 August 1940 when she became APD-1.

== World War II ==
At dusk on 11 April 1942, she picked up 290 survivors from the torpedoed merchant passenger steamer SS Ulysses, and landed them at Charleston, South Carolina the following day. On 13 July 1942 Manley transited the Panama Canal for duty with the Pacific Fleet. Touching the Society and Fiji Islands, she reached Espiritu Santo, New Hebrides on 14 August, and loaded special cargo for Guadalcanal, invaded only one week earlier.

Carrying bombs, ammunition, and gasoline, Manley and Stringham (DD-83) got underway on 16 August. After exchanging their cargo for wounded marines, they returned to Espiritu Santo on the 19th. Manley was ordered to take torpedoed Blue (DD-387) in tow for Tulagi harbor before nightfall. Since a Japanese surface force was approaching, it was necessary to scuttle the destroyer. Manley took 99 survivors on board. Only two hours of fuel remained when the ship made it back to Espiritu Santo on the 26th.

Ordered to cut out all topside weight on the ship, her crew removed everything not essential to survival, painted the ship jungle green and covered her with camouflage nets. Thus arrayed, the high-speed transport made another trip to Guadalcanal on 3 September 1942. After Little (APD-4) and Gregory (APD-3) were sunk on the night of 5 September, she rescued five survivors the next morning.

On 8 September 1942 Manley took part in a surprise landing on Taivu Point, Guadalcanal, by the 1st Marine Raider Battalion. The leathernecks were put ashore at 05:00, and were reinforced by paramarines from Manley at 11:30. During the operation she bombarded Tasimboko village. The raid was a great success, and played an important role in final victory. Stores, ammunition, and equipment were destroyed and many 75 mm guns were pulled off into deep water by Higgins boats. Larger guns were dynamited, and their ammunition sunk. Reembarkation was completed by 18:30, and Manley returned to Lunga Point to put the raiders ashore.

As she was unloading, the shore station ordered her to clear out at highest speed, since a raid by Japanese heavy units was expected momentarily. With 200 marines, including wounded and dead, on board, she hoisted all boats and headed out Lengo Channel with McKean (DD-90) at 21:10. Manley had fuel for only one day's operations and so returned to Tulagi the next day. Taking on enough fuel to reach Espiritu Santo, she was routed onward for voyage repairs at Nouméa, New Caledonia.

A company of marine raiders came on board on 31 October 1942 with orders to establish a beachhead at Aola Bay, Guadalcanal. Task Force 65 (TF 65) put the marines ashore on 4 November 1942, and troops from Manley and McKean reinforced them on the 8th.

The versatile fighting ship left Nouméa on 20 November 1942 carrying six torpedoes, towing two PT boats, and escorting SS Pomona to Espiritu Santo. Here she embarked another company of raiders and sailed for Lunga Point, Guadalcanal where the raiders debarked. The PT boats and torpedoes were then delivered to Tulagi, Solomon Islands. In the following months, the high-speed transport was constantly engaged in the risky business of running supplies into Guadalcanal and escorting other ships through the dangerous Solomons.

Manley arrived at San Francisco, California on 12 June 1943 for overhaul at Hunters Point Navy Yard. Then, on 1 August 1943, Manley set sail for Hawaii. From Pearl Harbor, the veteran four-piper escorted a convoy south to Funafuti to resume her former duties in the Solomon Islands.

Manley arrived at Pearl Harbor on 14 December 1943 and joined the V Amphibious Corps to prepare for Operation Flintlock, the invasion of the Marshall Islands. She sortied on 22 January 1944 with TF 52. On the 30th she and Overton (DD-239) were detached to make a dawn strike on Carter and Cecil Islands of Kwajalein Atoll. All boats and troops were launched shortly before sunrise on 31 January 1944, and by 09:00 reported that they had killed 13 of the enemy on the island at a cost of one American killed and one wounded.

The two high-speed transports were ordered to land 7th Cavalry Regiment reconnaissance troops on Bennett Islands before dawn on 5 February, and Manley was designated fire support ship. The area was well-covered, and the operation went off on schedule.

Three days later Manley got underway as part of a transport screen for Hawaii, arriving Pearl Harbor on the 15th to train Army troops for future landings.

On 30 May Manley joined Task Group 52.15 (TG 52.15) and departed for the invasion of Saipan. The high-speed transports arrived off Saipan on the night of 14 June and landed their marines on established beaches south of Garapan on 16 June. Thereafter, except for a trip to Eniwetok for supplies and night harassing fire on Tinian Town and airports on the nights of 9, 12, and 18 July Manley operated in the transport screen until 22 July. She returned to Eniwetok on the 22nd and, after a trip to Kwajalein, sailed to Pearl Harbor, arriving on 9 August, she began preparations for the next operation.

On 10 September Manley took on board 50 tons of explosives, slated as reserves for underwater demolition team work in the proposed invasion of Yap. She left Pearl Harbor on the 15th and proceeded via Eniwetok to Manus, Admiralty Islands. There word arrived that the operation against Yap had been canceled and that the forces assembled would strike Leyte in the Philippines. Manley was then assigned to the bombardment and fire support group which arrived in Leyte Gulf early on 18 October.

After entering Leyte Gulf, Manley was assigned screening stations off the southern transport area at Dulag. On the 19th she picked up casualties from Ross (DD-563), and transferred them to Pennsylvania (BB-38). After marking a navigational buoy during the early morning hours of the 20th, she headed toward Hollandia with TransDiv 28, on the evening of 21 October.

En route, part of the convoy, including Manley, was diverted to Seeadler Harbor, Manus, Admiralty Islands, and anchored there on the 27th. After an escort trip to New Guinea, Manley returned to Seeadler Harbor. In mid-December, she shifted to Noemfoor Island for tactical exercises and training for the liberation of Luzon.

Manley sailed on 4 January 1945 as part of a reinforcement group for the landings at Lingayen Gulf, Luzon, landing her embarked troops on the 11th. Two days later she left Lingayen, escorting an LST convoy which anchored in Leyte Gulf on 18 January.

Manley was one of four high-speed transports assigned to an assault landing at Nasugbu, Luzon, on 31 January. With elements of the 11th Airborne Division, Manley arrived at Nasugbu Bay on 31 January and landed troops in two waves without resistance. That afternoon Manley returned to Leyte. She proceeded to Mindoro for fueling, and then escorted a convoy to Subic Bay.

To block retreat by the Japanese into Bataan, Manley with TransDiv 100 and six LCI(L)'s, put some 700 assault troops ashore at Mariveles on 15 February 1945. On the 17th, she landed troops on Corregidor. Hidden gun emplacements shelled her boats, sinking one and wounding an Army officer, but the landings succeeded. That evening the transport returned to Subic Bay.

On 2 April the transport joined the screen of escort aircraft carriers loaded with the first land-based planes to be sent to Okinawa. The first section of the task group launched planes to land on Okinawa on 7 April 1945. The following day Manley's task group closed the islands to launch the remainder of the aircraft for landing strips on that bitterly contested "last stepping stone" to Japan. Manley dropped depth charges on a submarine contact during the launch. Then she protected escort carriers White Plains (CVE-66) and Hollandia (CVE-97) to Guam.

== 1945 and the end of the war ==
Manley arrived at San Diego on 23 May for overhaul. She was reclassified DD-74 on 25 June 1945 and sailed on 24 July for the Pearl Harbor Navy Yard, where she was fitted with a catapult for target drones. As she was helping train gunners to meet Kamikaze attacks, the war ended and Manley departed the Hawaiian Islands on 26 September for San Diego, then via the Panama Canal to Philadelphia Naval Shipyard, where she decommissioned on 19 November 1945.

Her name was struck from the Navy list on 5 December 1945; and she was sold for scrapping to the Northern Metal Company, Philadelphia, on 26 November 1946.

== Awards ==
- Navy Unit Commendation
- World War I Victory Medal
- American Defense Service Medal with "FLEET" clasp
- Asiatic–Pacific Campaign Medal with five battle stars
- World War II Victory Medal
- Philippine Liberation Medal
