= NER Class S2 =

Class of British steam locomotives

NER Class S2 LNER Class B15
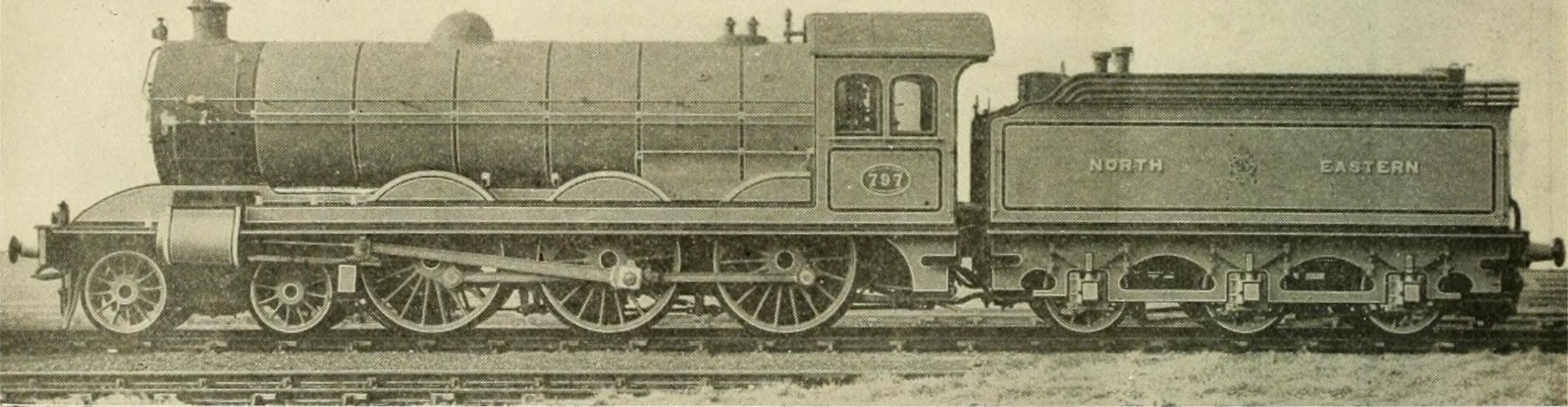
Type and origin
- Power type: Steam
- Designer: Vincent Raven
- Build date: 1911-1913
- Total produced: 20
Specifications
- Configuration
  - Whyte: 4-6-0
- Leading dia.: 3 ft 7 1/4 in (1.099 m)
- Driver dia.: 6 ft 1 1/4 in (1.861 m)
- Wheelbase: 26 ft 0 1/2 in (7.938 m) engine 12 ft 8 in (3.86 m) tender 50 ft 8 1/4 in (15.450 m) total
- Axle load: 19.4 long tons (19.7 t)
- Loco weight: 71.1 long tons (72.2 t)
- Tender weight: 44 long tons (45 t)
- Total weight: 115.1 long tons (116.9 t)
- Firebox
  - Grate area: 23 sq ft (2.1 m^{2})
- Boiler: 5 ft 6 in (1.68 m)
- Boiler pressure: 175 psi (1.21 MPa)
- Heating surface
  - Firebox: 140 sq ft (13 m^{2})
  - Tubes: 723 sq ft (67.2 m^{2})
  - Flues: 506 sq ft (47.0 m^{2})
  - Total surface: 1,730 sq ft (161 m^{2})
- Superheater
  - Heating area: 361 sq ft (33.5 m^{2})
- Cylinders: 2, outside
- Cylinder size: 20 in × 26 in (510 mm × 660 mm)
- Valve gear: Stephenson
Performance figures
- Tractive effort: 21,115 lbf (93.92 kN)
Career
- Operators: North Eastern Railway, London and North Eastern Railway
- Numbers: NER: 782, 786-788, 791, 795-799, 813, 815, 817, 819-825; LNER (1946): 1691-1698
- Withdrawn: 1937-1947
- Disposition: All scrapped

The North Eastern Railway Class S2, later the London and North Eastern Railway Class B15, was a mixed-traffic 4-6-0 steam locomotive designed by Vincent Raven for North Eastern Railway and later transferred to the London North Eastern Railway. The design was based on NER Class S.

== Superheaters ==
The first seven were built with saturated (non-superheated) boilers, however the remaining thirteen were fitted with Robinson 24-element superheaters. The saturated B15s were eventually fitted with superheaters. Some of these rebuilds used Schmidt superheaters, however they were eventually converted to use Robinson superheaters, as Robinson superheaters were the LNER's standard type of superheaters.

== Stumpf Uniflow variant ==
The last of the class, No.825 was fitted with Stumpf Uniflow cylinders. The inlet and exhaust ports were separate. Although the exhaust port was always the same size, the inlet port could vary in size according to the position of the cutoff. In 1918, the system was used on C7 No.2212, with a tidier result. Due to the special attention required for these experimental locomotives, in March 1924, the locomotive was rebuilt as a standard B15, matching the other members.

== Performance ==
Although they were used on their suitable work, they steamed poorly if handled with crews who were not used to the B15s (which also affected the B13s), and thus they were unpopular with crews who did not have enough experience on the B15s.

== Accidents and incidents ==
- On 14 February 1920, locomotive No. 787 was hauling a freight train which was involved in a head-on collision with a freight train hauled by locomotive No. 788 at Skelton, Yorkshire.

== Withdrawal ==
Withdrawal commenced with No.788 in September 1937, and all were gone by December 1947, with the last being No.1696 (NER No.820). None were preserved.
