= NER Class S =

Class of British steam locomotives

NER Class S LNER Class B13
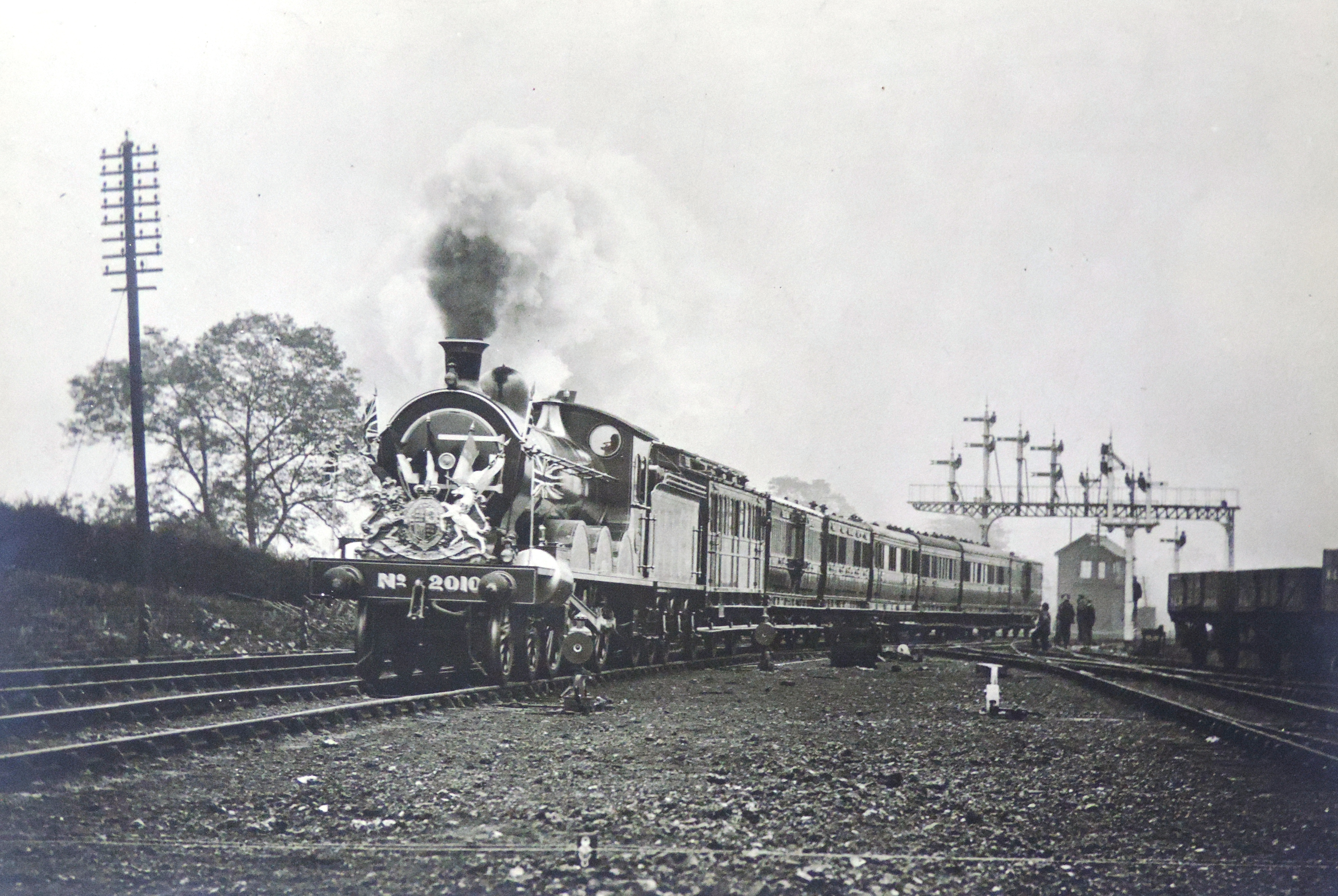
- 2010 with the Royal Train (Date and location unknown)
Type and origin
- Power type: Steam
- Designer: Wilson Worsdell
- Builder: Gateshead Works
- Build date: 1899–1909
- Total produced: 40
Specifications
- Configuration
  - Whyte: 4-6-0
  - UIC: 2′C n2, later 2′C h2
- Leading dia.: 3 ft 7 1/4 in (1.099 m)
- Coupled dia.: 6 ft 1 1/4 in (1.861 m)
- Wheelbase: 50 ft 8 1/4 in (15.450 m)
  - Engine: 26 ft 0 1/2 in (7.938 m)
  - Tender: 12 ft 8 in (3.861 m)
- Length: 61 ft 0 3/4 in (18.612 m)
- Axle load: 19.70 long tons (20.02 t)
- Adhesive weight: 48.10 long tons (48.87 t)
- Loco weight: 64.30 long tons (65.33 t)
- Tender weight: 43.50 long tons (44.20 t)
- Total weight: 107.80 long tons (109.53 t)
- Fuel capacity: 5.00 long tons (5.08 t)
- Water cap.: 3,940 imp gal (17,900 L; 4,730 US gal)
- Firebox
  - Grate area: 23 sq ft (2.1 m^{2})
- Boiler: LNER diagram 54
- Boiler pressure: 160 psi (1.1 MPa)
- Heating surface
  - Firebox: 120 sq ft (11 m^{2})
  - Tubes: 884 sq ft (82.1 m^{2})
  - Flues: 379 sq ft (35.2 m^{2})
  - Total surface: 1,659 sq ft (154.1 m^{2})
- Superheater
  - Type: Schmidt
  - Heating area: 276 sq ft (25.6 m^{2})
- Cylinders: Two, outside
- Cylinder size: 20 in × 26 in (508 mm × 660 mm)
- Valve gear: Stephenson
- Valve type: 8 3/4-inch (222 mm) piston valves (first 8 built with sides valves, but altered 1901–21)
Performance figures
- Tractive effort: 19,309 lbf (85.89 kN)
Career
- Operators: North Eastern Railway; London & North Eastern Railway
- Withdrawn: 1928–1938
- Disposition: All scrapped

The North Eastern Railway Class S (LNER Class B13) was a 4-6-0 type of steam locomotive designed for express passenger workings. The first example was built in 1899. They were very similar to the eventual NER Class S1, except for the smaller wheels of the former.

== Design ==
They were designed to reduce double heading on the East Coast Main Line. However they steamed poorly, with a smaller and shallower grate than was used even by other locomotives at the time (a problem which also affected the B14s and later, the B15s), and the 4-4-0s of the NER Class R quickly replaced them, with the 4-4-2 layout being preferred for later express passenger designs. The class were re-classified as London and North Eastern Railway Class B13 in 1923.

== Modifications ==
The first seven locomotives had slide valves, while the remainder had piston valves. The slide valve engines were later fitted with piston valves. Schmidt superheaters were fitted between 1913 and 1925.

== Numbering ==
Table of locomotives
NER No.	Date built	Date superheated	Date withdrawn	Notes
2001	Jun 1899	Feb 1916	Jun 1931	
2002	Jun 1899	Jul 1924	Jul 1931	
2003	Sep 1899	May 1920	Jul 1931	
2004	Dec 1899	Apr 1921	Aug 1928	
2005	Dec 1899	Nov 1916	Nov 1928	
2006	Dec 1899	Apr 1918	Jun 1931	
2007	Mar 1900	Jun 1916	Oct 1928	
2008	May 1900	Apr 1917	Dec 1929	
2009	Jun 1900	Jul 1915	Jul 1931	
2010	Jun 1900	Apr 1916	Jul 1931	
726	Apr 1906	Nov 1915	Dec 1936	
740	Apr 1906	Jul 1914	Sep 1932	
757	Apr 1906	Mar 1918	May 1932	
760	May 1906	Apr 1915	Mar 1931	
761	Jun 1906	Nov 1924	Sep 1934	Transferred to service stock September 1934; superheater removed; renumbered 1699 October 1946; retired May 1951.
763	Jun 1906	Jan 1916	Apr 1929	
766	Jun 1906	Dec 1916	Oct 1931	
768	Jun 1906	Aug 1918	May 1929	
775	Aug 1906	Dec 1920	Aug 1936	
1077	Aug 1906	Jun 1918	Nov 1931	
738	Jun 1908	Aug 1916	Jul 1938	
739	Jun 1908	Feb 1925	Jul 1932	
741	Jun 1908	May 1917	Jan 1930	
743	Jul 1908	Oct 1917	May 1932	
744	Jul 1908	Nov 1915	Dec 1931	
745	Aug 1908	Dec 1921	Dec 1931	
746	Aug 1908	Mar 1918	Nov 1931	
747	Sep 1908	Oct 1920	Aug 1932	
748	Sep 1908	Mar 1915	Oct 1938	
749	Oct 1908	Nov 1915	Apr 1930	
750	Nov 1908	Jan 1915	Nov 1932	
751	Nov 1908	Nov 1913	May 1936	
752	Nov 1908	Mar 1920	Jun 1934	
753	Dec 1908	Nov 1916	Oct 1938	
754	Jan 1909	Jul 1922	Dec 1936	
755	Jan 1909	Aug 1917	Feb 1934	
756	Jan 1909	Nov 1919	Sep 1934	
758	Feb 1909	Nov 1915	May 1930	
759	Mar 1909	Sep 1923	Oct 1938	
762	Mar 1909	Jun 1917	May 1937	

== Withdrawal ==
They were withdrawn between 1928 and 1938.
