= George Henderson =

George Henderson may refer to:

== Academia and science ==
- George Henderson (architect) (1846–1905), Scottish architect
- George Washington Henderson (1850–1936), American academic
- G. G. Henderson (George Gerald Henderson, 1862–1942), chemist and professor
- George Henderson (scholar) (1866–1912), Gaelic scholar
- George Cockburn Henderson (1870–1944), Australian academic in the Universities of Sydney and Adelaide
- George D. S. Henderson (born 1931), art historian, author, and emeritus Professor of Medieval Art at the University of Cambridge
- George Robin Henderson (1941–2016), Scottish mathematician

== Arts and entertainment ==
- George Wylie Henderson (1904–1965), American author of the Harlem Renaissance
- George Henderson (cartoonist) (1911–1985), New Zealand cartoonist

== Military ==
- George Henderson (British Army officer) (1783–1855), Scottish lieutenant-colonel and royal engineer
- George Francis Robert Henderson (1854–1903), British soldier and military author
- George R. Henderson (1893–1964), World War II-era officer in United States Navy
- George Stuart Henderson (1893–1920), recipient of the Victoria Cross
- George Henderson (GC), British recipient of the George Cross

== Politics ==
- George Henderson (Australian politician) (1857–1933), Australian politician
- George Henderson (Manitoba politician) (1916–2008), former MLA in Manitoba
- George Henderson (Northern Ireland politician) (fl. 1920s), former Member of the Northern Ireland Parliament for Antrim
- George Henderson (Prince Edward Island politician) (1935–2020), former Member of Parliament in Canada

== Sports ==
- George Henderson (footballer, born 1873), Scottish footballer
- George Henderson (footballer, born 1880) (1880–1930), Scottish footballer
- George Henderson (footballer, born 1902) (1902–1975), Scottish footballer for Sunderland
- Geordie Henderson (1897–1953), Scottish footballer
- Krazy George Henderson (born 1944), American cheerleader
- Rube Henderson (George E. Henderson, 1894–1978), American baseball player

== Religion ==
- George Henderson (bishop) (1922–1997), Episcopal bishop and Primus in Scotland
- G. D. Henderson (1888–1957), Scottish historian and minister of the Church of Scotland

== Fictional characters ==
- George Henderson, in the 1987 film Harry and the Hendersons
- George Henderson (River City), Scottish soap opera character

== Other uses ==
- George R. Henderson Medal, given by the Franklin Institute for improvements to railway engineering
