= Bay 13 =

Seating area in the Melbourne Cricket Ground

Coordinates: 37°49′12″S 144°59′0″E

Bay 13 is a section of tiered seating at the Melbourne Cricket Ground that occupies part of the Shane Warne Stand behind the slips for a right-handed batsman, usually where third man is fielding. It was well known in the cricket world as a centre for rowdy spectators to congregate at the cricket and participate in practices such as Mexican waves, beach ball throwing and other disorderly conduct, often including abuse chanting towards opposition players.

== History ==
In 2019 the Bay 13 area was replaced with a "Boundary Social" area with higher-priced tickets, a dress code and a private bar.

== Criticism ==
Bay 13 is situated almost opposite across the ground from the members stand and despite efforts to tame the behaviour of the crowd from this section of the ground, it had the worst behaved crowds of all the cricketing venues in the country.

=== Racism ===
In more recent times, Bay 13 has often been accused of racially abusing opposition teams, fans and players. The first such instance occurred on Boxing Day, 2005, when Bay 13 directed racial taunts in Afrikaans at South African fast bowler André Nel. The South African Cricket Board has repeatedly raised concerns over racial taunting of players by Bay 13. Fans were ejected from the 2018 Boxing Day test for taunting Indian players and spectators.
