= Lantern Queen =

American passenger ship

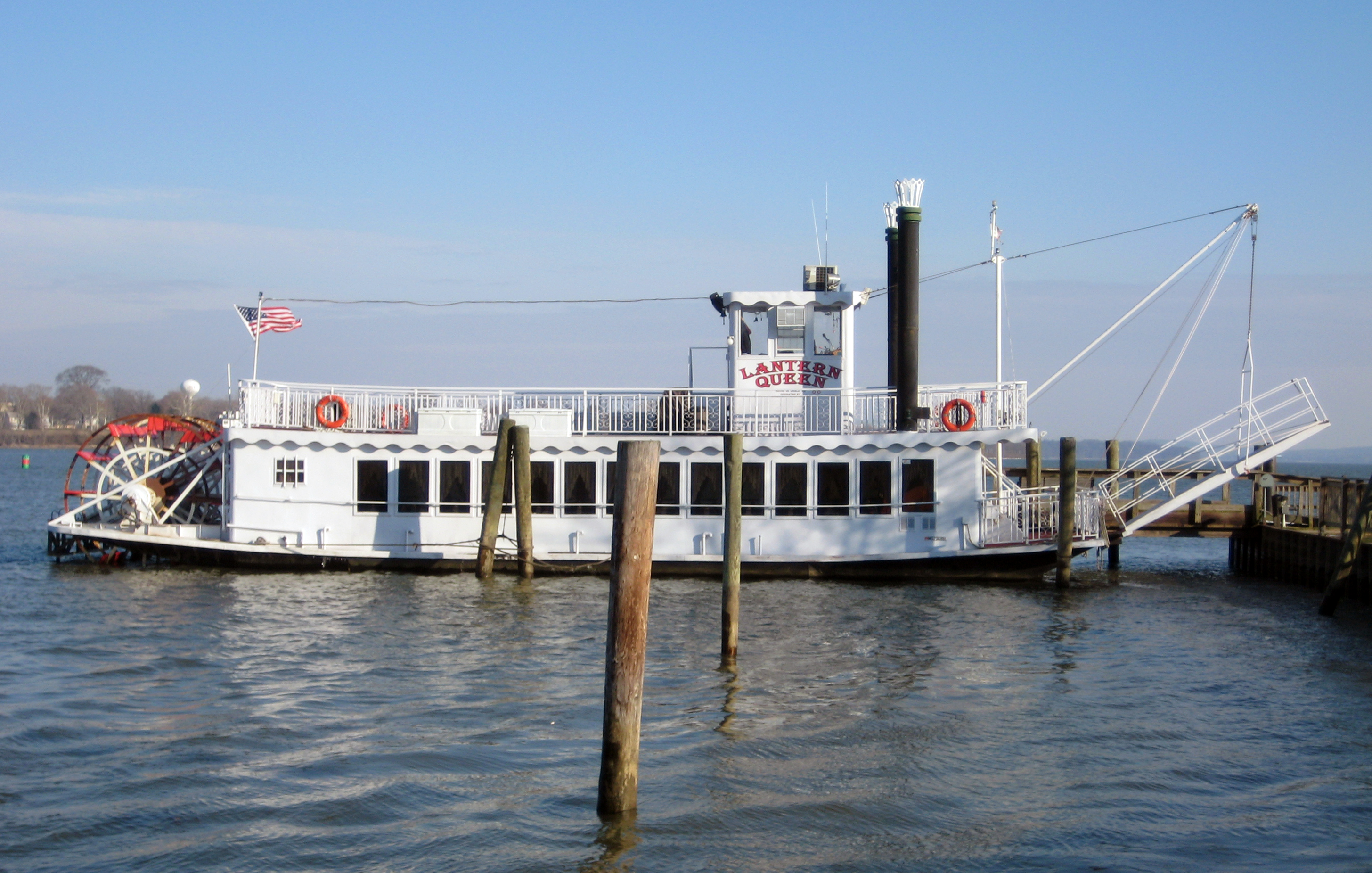
- The Lantern Queen at dock on the Susquehanna River in Havre de Grace, Maryland, on December 19, 2010

History
- Name: Lantern Queen
- Owner: River City Trading, LLC
- Operator: River City Trading, LLC
- Builder: LaCrosse Riverboat Co., Ltd. LaCrosse, Wisconsin
- Yard number: 008
- Completed: 1983
- Homeport: Havre de Grace, Maryland
- Identification: Call sign: WDD9983; USCG Doc. No.: 660182
- Status: Retired, 2014

General characteristics
- Type: Sternwheel, paddle steamer replica
- Tonnage: 26 GT
- Length: 60 ft (18 m)
- Beam: 16 ft (4.9 m)
- Depth: 4 ft (1.2 m)
- Installed power: 30 kW generator
- Propulsion: Sternwheel turned by two hydraulic motors powered by a Detroit Diesel engine
- Notes: Formerly Far West

Lantern Queen was a sternwheel replica-paddle steamer passenger ship operating on the Susquehanna River out of Havre de Grace, Maryland.

== History ==
The Lantern Queen was built in 1983 in La Crosse, Wisconsin, by the La Crosse Riverboat Co., Ltd. After her construction, she was operated as Far West—a dinner cruise vessel—on the Missouri River, hailing out of Yankton, South Dakota. From 1994 to 1996 the ship was operated in Florida as the Lantern Queen. In 1996, the vessel was purchased and restored by Jack Morey who operated her on the Susquehanna River until the spring of 2007. Later that year, the Lantern Queen was purchased by her current owner, River City Trading, LLC, of Havre de Grace, Maryland. Since 2008, Krazy George Henderson has worked as a deckhand on the Lantern Queen. She was pulled from service and retired in July 2014 after a U.S. Coast Guard inspection found extensive electrolytic pitting in her hull with the cost of repairs exceeding the vessel's worth.
