= USS Edmonds =

1943 John C. Butler-class destroyer escort

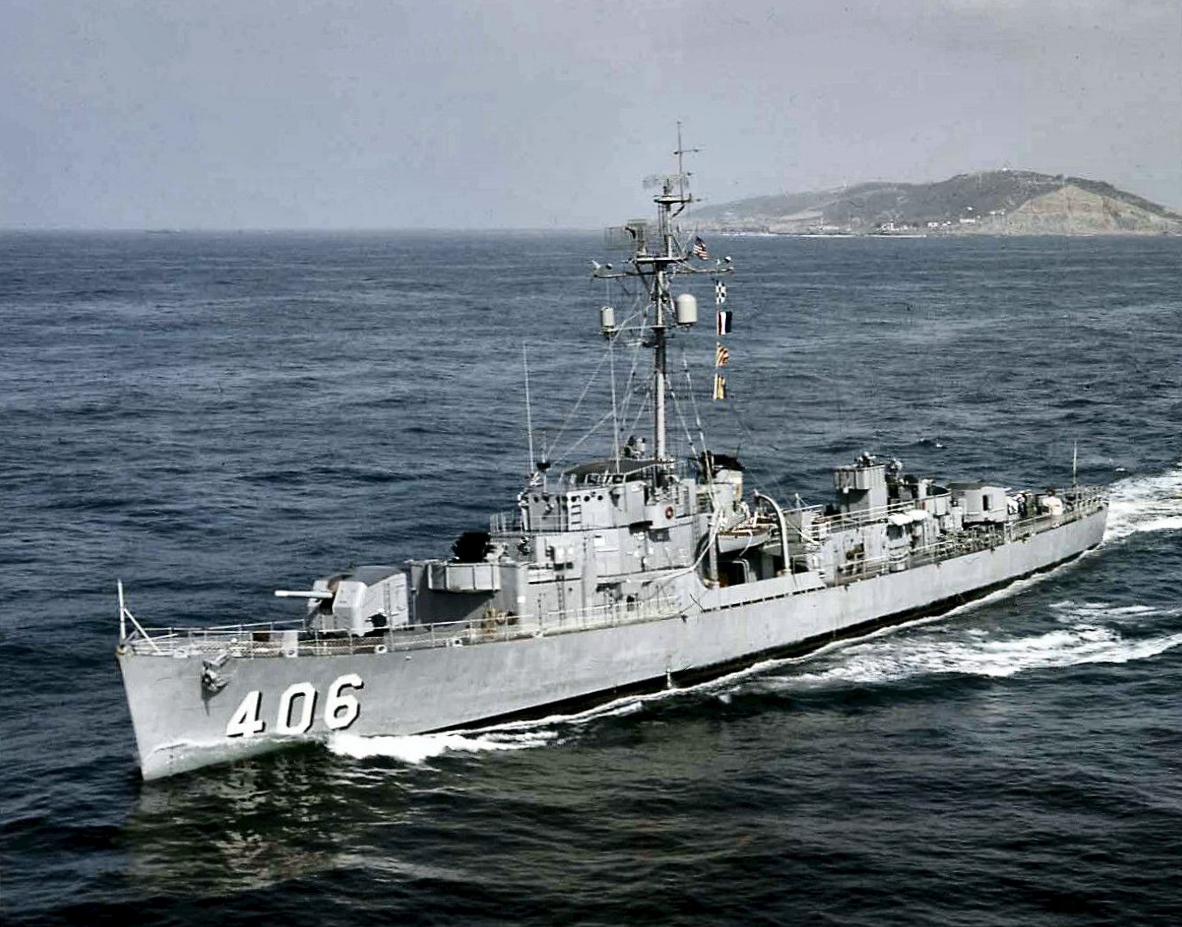
- Edmonds underway off Point Loma, California c. the 1950s

History

United States
- Name: Edmonds
- Laid down: 1 November 1943
- Launched: 17 December 1943
- Commissioned: 3 April 1944
- Decommissioned: 31 May 1946
- In service: 28 February 1951
- Out of service: April 1965
- Stricken: 15 May 1972
- Fate: Sold for scrapping 20 September 1973

General characteristics
- Class & type: John C. Butler-class destroyer escort
- Displacement: 1,350 long tons (1,372 t)
- Length: 306 ft (93 m) overall
- Beam: 36 ft 10 in (11.23 m)
- Draft: 13 ft 4 in (4.06 m) maximum
- Propulsion: 2 boilers, 2 geared steam turbines, 12,000 shp (8,900 kW), 2 screws
- Speed: 24 knots (44 km/h)
- Range: 6,000 nautical miles (11,000 km) at 12 knots (22 km/h)
- Complement: 14 officers, 201 enlisted
- Armament: 2 × 5"/38 caliber guns; 2 × twin 40 mm AA guns; 10 × 20 mm AA cannon; 3 × 21 in (533 mm) torpedo tubes; 1 Hedgehog ASW mortar; 8 depth charge projectors, 2 depth charge tracks

USS Edmonds (DE-406) was a John C. Butler-class destroyer escort in service with the United States Navy from 1944 to 1946 and from 1951 to 1965. She was scrapped in 1973.

== Namesake ==
Bert C. Edmonds was born on 21 March 1919 in Longmont, Colorado. He enlisted in the Navy on 11 September 1937. Aviation Ordnanceman First Class Edmonds was serving with Torpedo Squadron 8 when he was killed in action in the Solomon Islands on 16 October 1942. He was posthumously awarded the Silver Star Medal.

== History ==
The ship was launched on 17 December 1943 by Brown Shipbuilding Co., at Houston, Texas; sponsored by Mrs. F. Campbell, mother of Aviation Ordnanceman Edmonds. The vessel was commissioned on 3 April 1944.

=== World War II ===
Edmonds reached Pearl Harbor from Boston, Massachusetts, 27 June 1944. After screening escort carriers to Eniwetok and back, she took part in the reception given President F. D. Roosevelt 25 July when he arrived at Pearl Harbor to confer with Pacific Ocean commanders. Four days later Edmonds sailed to report to the U.S. 7th Fleet at Manus. On 31 August she embarked Commander, Escort Division 63, and served as his flagship until 20 November.

Between 10 September and 7 October Edmonds screened escort carriers providing air support for the invasion of Morotai. She got underway with the same ships on 14 October for the first invasion of the Philippines at Leyte on 20 October. At the Battle off Samar on 25 and 26 October, Edmonds was at sea bound for Morotai as screen for Saginaw Bay and Chenango who were to pick up replacement aircraft. She escorted veterans of the Battle of Leyte Gulf to Manus, then continued to Pearl Harbor for overhaul.

Edmonds left Pearl Harbor on 5 December 1944 screening two escort carriers to Manus. With the escort carrier group she returned to the Philippines for invasion landings in Lingayen Gulf on 9 January.

Joining the U.S. 5th Fleet at Ulithi in January 1945, Edmonds screened escort carriers in the Iwo Jima operation in February. On 21 February Bismarck Sea was sunk after the crash of a Japanese kamikaze detonated the escort carrier's ammunition. Edmonds directed the rescue operations, saving 378 of the carrier's crew including the commanding officer, in spite of darkness, heavy seas, and continuing air attacks. Thirty of her own crew went over the side to bring the wounded and exhausted carrier men to safety.

Edmonds returned to Leyte in March 1945 to join Carrier Division 22 for the invasion of Okinawa. This group supplied direct air support for the landings 1 April and later neutralized the airfields on Sakishima. On 19 May Edmonds began dangerous and exacting duties on the radar picket line, patrolling in company with the destroyer Gainard, a fighter-director ship on station north of Okinawa. She also took part in the capture of Iheya Shima and Aguni Shima in June.

Edmonds arrived at San Pedro Bay, Leyte on 23 June 1945, and in July escorted convoys from the Philippines to New Guinea, Ulithi, and Okinawa until the end of the war. She returned to San Diego, California on 6 November and was placed out of commission in reserve there on 31 May 1946.

=== Korean War ===
Recommissioned on 28 February 1951 for service in the Korean War, Edmonds arrived at her home port, Pearl Harbor, on 14 July. She deployed to the Far East from 29 October 1951 to 1 June 1952, and served on the bomb-line off Songjin. From March 1953 through mid-1958 Edmonds conducted surveillance patrols in the Marianas and Carolines, United Nations Trust Territories under the Trusteeship of the United States since the end of World War II. During this time she apprehended fishing vessels violating territorial waters off these islands; transferred natives for repopulation; and aided various scientific experiments.

=== Quemoy and Matsu crisis ===
When Communist China began intensive shelling of the Nationalist Chinese-held offshore islands of Quemoy and Matsu in the summer of 1958, Edmonds was ordered from Pearl Harbor to the Pescadores, and until the end of the year remained off the Chinese coast on patrol, screening Nationalist supply convoys to within three miles of Quemoy. She cleared Yokosuka for Pearl Harbor on 13 January 1959.

=== Training operations ===
Edmonds arrived at Portland, Oregon, in March 1959 for duty in the reserve training program. In August 1960 the Edmonds moved to a new home port at Treasure Island, California continuing duty as a reserve training vessel. In September 1961, the warship began preparations for an overseas cruise with her reserve crew, ultimately sailing for the Far East on 22 January 1962. Arriving in Da Nang, South Vietnam on 18 February, the destroyer escort conducted training operations with the South Vietnamese Navy through 10 April, including exercises in the Gulf of Siam. After port visits to Hong Kong and Yokosuka and Sasebo, Japan, she steamed east to her new home port of Treasure Island, San Francisco, arriving there on 17 July. Edmonds spent the next two years conducting training cruises north to Canada and south to Mexico, with the occasional voyage to Pearl Harbor, until December 1964 when she began inactivation procedures.

=== Final decommissioning ===
Edmonds decommissioned at Mare Island Naval Shipyard in March 1965 and remained there in reserve until struck from the Navy List on 15 May 1972. She was sold for scrap to General Metals of Tacoma Inc. on 28 September 1973.

== Awards ==
Edmonds received five battle stars for World War II service and two for Korean War service.
