= USS Highlands =

Haskell-class attack transport ship

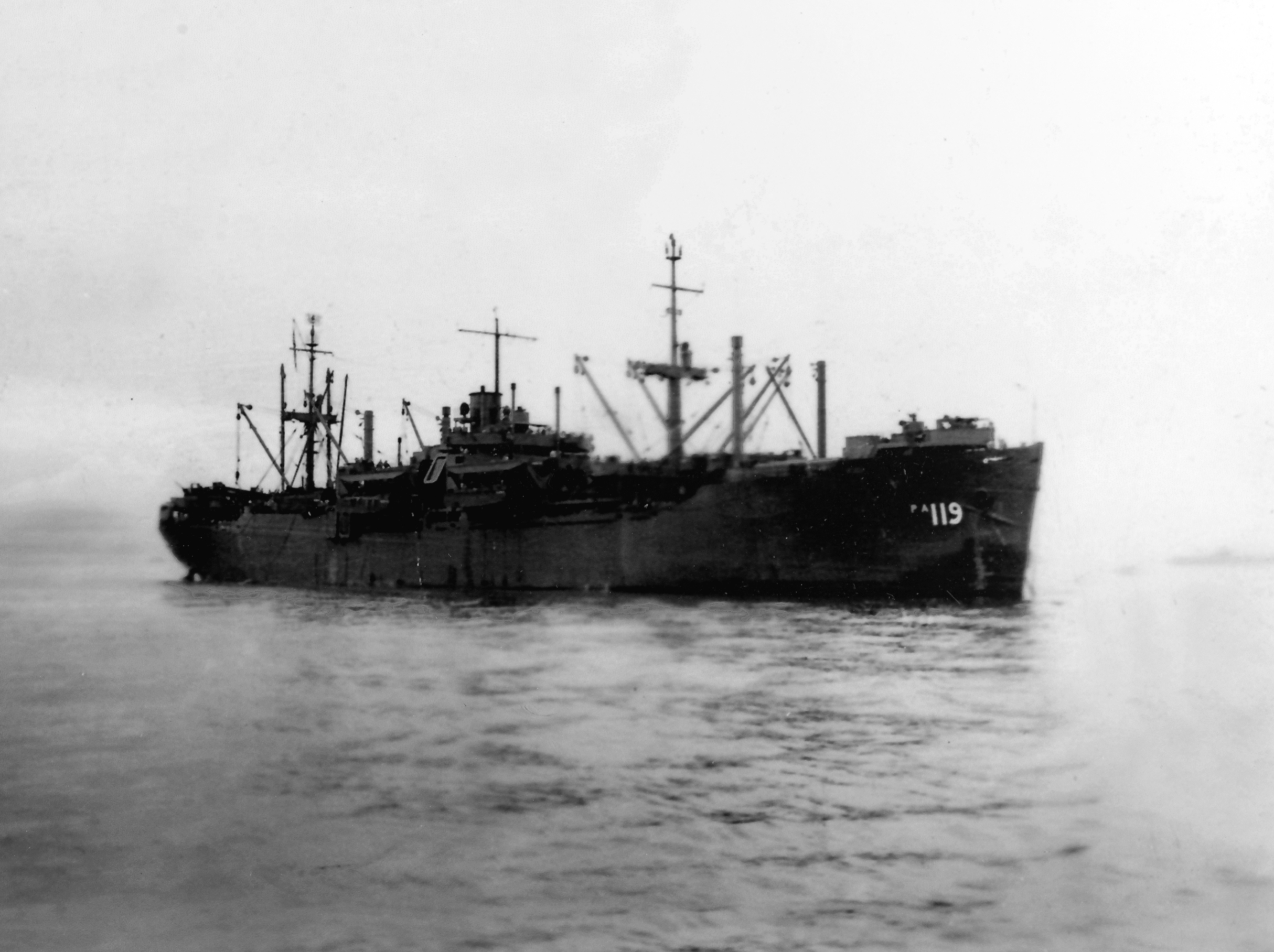
- USS Highlands (APA-119) in the Pacific, c. 1945 or early 1946.

History

United States
- Name: Highlands
- Namesake: Highlands County, Florida
- Builder: California Shipbuilding
- Launched: 8 July 1944
- Commissioned: 5 October 1944
- Decommissioned: 14 February 1946
- Honors and awards: 2 Battle stars
- Fate: Sold for scrap, 9 April 1973

General characteristics
- Class & type: Haskell-class attack transport
- Displacement: 6,873 tons (lt), 14,837 t (fl)
- Length: 455 ft (139 m)
- Beam: 62 ft (19 m)
- Draft: 24 ft (7 m)
- Propulsion: 1 × geared turbine, 2 × header-type boilers, 1 × propeller, designed 8,500 shp (6,338 kW)
- Speed: 17 knots (31 km/h; 20 mph)
- Boats & landing craft carried: 2 × LCM; 12 × LCVP; 3 × LCPL
- Capacity: Troops: 86 officers, 1,475 enlisted; Cargo: 150,000 cu ft, 2,900 tons
- Complement: 56 officers, 480 enlisted
- Armament: 1 × 5"/38 dual-purpose gun; 4 × twin 40mm guns; 10 × single 20mm guns; late armament, add 1 × 40mm quad mount

USS Highlands (APA-119) was a Haskell-class attack transport built and used by the US Navy in World War II. She was a Victory ship design, VC2-S-AP5. She was named after Highlands County, Florida, United States.

== World War II service ==
Highlands was launched on July 8, 1944 under United States Maritime Commission contract by California Shipbuilding Company, Wilmington, Los Angeles; sponsored by Mrs. G. W. D. Dashiell; acquired by the Navy and commissioned October 5, 1944.

The new transport conducted shakedown training out of San Pedro until 30 October. Following a rigorous period of drills, which would serve her well in the months to come, Highlands sailed to San Francisco to embark her troops, and got underway November 23 for Hawaii.

Arriving Pearl Harbor November 29, the ship again turned to amphibious training, in preparation for the epochal Iwo Jima landings, one of the most important steps in the Navy's island campaign that drove relentlessly toward Japan. Highlands sailed with her task group on January 27, 1945 via Eniwetok for Saipan, where she arrived on February 11. Five days later she sailed for Iwo Jima and commenced unloading on the beaches the morning of February 19. For the next six days the transport unloaded troops and supplies during the day and retired under escort cover each night. Japanese air attacks were heavy during this period, claiming escort carrier USS Bismarck Sea (CVE-95) in a kamikaze attack February 21 and damaging several other ships, including USS Saratoga (CV-3). In addition to her regular duties, Highlands received over 150 survivors of Bismarck Sea on February 22, as well as casualties from the hard-pressed Marine units ashore.

Highlands departed Iwo Jima on February 25 and after debarking casualties at Saipan proceeded to Espiritu Santo, arriving March 15, 1945. There she took on fresh troops for the next major assault of the Pacific War, the invasion of Okinawa, called by Winston Churchill ". . . among the most intense and famous of military history." Highlands did not take part in the initial landings, arriving in the Ryukyus on April 3. The transport remained at Kerama Retto until April 11, when she took part in the early morning assault on Tsugen Jima, a small but key island controlling the approaches to the large bay on Okinawa's east side. As Marines gained control of the island, Highlands took casualties on board, and moved directly off Hagushi beaches on April 12 to disembark reserve troops. .During the three days that followed antiaircraft fire and smoke screens helped protect the transport from almost continuous air attack, and after completing her mission Highlands sailed for Saipan on April 16.

Arriving Saipan on April 20, Highlands unloaded casualties and proceeded the next day to Ulithi. She departed May 22 for Guam and then Leyte, arriving in Leyte Gulf on May 31. The transport now busily prepared for the expected amphibious landings on the Japanese mainland, operations which were terminated by the Japanese surrender on August 15, 1945. Highlands had been operating off Panay Island when the surrender came; she sailed on August 21 to load occupation troops on Luzon. Highlands and other transports of her group entered Tokyo Bay the day of the formal ceremony, September 2, and landed units of the 1st Cavalry Division on Japanese soil.

Highlands returned to the Philippine Islands and Okinawa for more occupation troops in September and after the clearing of mines from Japan's inland sea landed troops at Kure on October 6. The veteran ship sailed on October 11 for Okinawa and San Diego carrying returnees, arriving in the United States on November 2. She made an additional voyage to Japanese ports between November 17 and December 26, before returning to San Francisco. She departed there on January 11, 1946 for the Panama Canal and Norfolk. Highlands arrived Hampton Roads on January 26, was decommissioned February 14 and placed in the United States Maritime Commission's National Defense Reserve Fleet, James River, Virginia.

== Fate ==
Between September 21 and November 23, 1956 she was withdrawn from the Reserve Fleet for a Repair Program, GAA- Farrell Lines, and returned. Ex-Highlands was sold for $111,560 to Union Minerals & Alloys Corporation for scrapping on April 9, 1973. On June 11, 1973 she was withdrawn from the Reserve Fleet and sent to the breaker's yard.

All that remains of Highlands is her brass builder's plate.

== Awards ==
Highlands received two battle stars for World War II service.
