= USS Bismarck Sea =

Casablanca-class escort carrier of the US Navy

Coordinates: 24°2′21″N 141°18′49″E

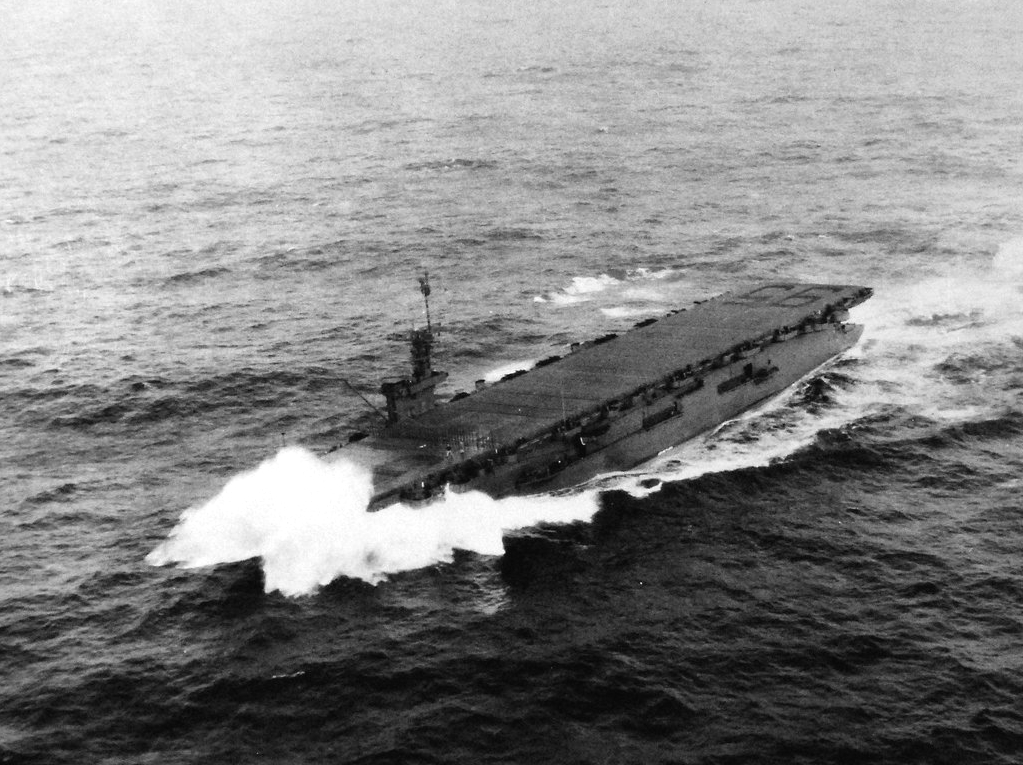
- USS Bismarck Sea (CVE-95) underway on 24 June 1944

History

United States
- Name: Alikula Bay (1944); Bismarck Sea(1944–1945)
- Namesake: Alikula Bay, Coronation Island, Alaska; Battle of the Bismarck Sea
- Awarded: 18 June 1942
- Builder: Kaiser Company, Vancouver Shipyard
- Yard number: MC hull 1132
- Laid down: 31 January 1944
- Launched: 17 April 1944
- Commissioned: 20 May 1944
- Renamed: Bismarck Sea, 16 May 1944
- Stricken: 30 March 1945
- Identification: CVE-95
- Honors and awards: 3 Battle stars
- Fate: Sunk during the Battle of Iwo Jima by kamikaze aircraft, 21 February 1945

General characteristics
- Class & type: Casablanca-class escort carrier
- Displacement: 8,188 long tons (8,319 t) (standard); 10,902 long tons (11,077 t) (full load)
- Length: 512 ft 3 in (156.13 m) (oa); 490 ft (150 m) (wl); 474 ft (144 m) (fd)
- Beam: 65 ft 2 in (19.86 m); 108 ft (33 m) (extreme width)
- Draft: 20 ft 9 in (6.32 m) (max)
- Installed power: 4 × Babcock & Wilcox boilers; 9,000 shp (6,700 kW)
- Propulsion: 2 × Skinner Unaflow reciprocating steam engines; 2 × screws
- Speed: 19 knots (35 km/h; 22 mph)
- Range: 10,240 nmi (18,960 km; 11,780 mi) at 15 kn (28 km/h; 17 mph)
- Complement: Total: 910 – 916 officers and men; Embarked Squadron: 50 – 56; Ship's Crew: 860
- Armament: As designed: 1 × 5 in (127 mm)/38 cal dual-purpose gun; 4 × twin 40 mm (1.57 in) Bofors anti-aircraft guns; 12 × 20 mm (0.79 in) Oerlikon anti-aircraft cannons; Varied, ultimate armament: 1 × 5 in (127 mm)/38 cal dual-purpose gun; 8 × twin 40 mm (1.57 in) Bofors anti-aircraft guns; 20 × 20 mm (0.79 in) Oerlikon anti-aircraft cannons
- Aircraft carried: 27 aircraft
- Aviation facilities: 1 × catapult; 2 × elevators

USS Bismarck Sea (CVE-95) was the fortieth of fifty Casablanca-class escort carriers built to serve the United States Navy during World War II; she was the only ship of the United States Navy to be named for the Battle of the Bismarck Sea. Completed in May 1944, she served in support of the Philippines campaign, and the landings on Iwo Jima. On 21 February 1945, she sank off of Iwo Jima due to two Japanese kamikaze attacks, killing 318 crewmen. Notably, she was the last aircraft carrier in U.S. commission to sink due to enemy action. (Note: The Bogue-class escort carrier Card was the last carrier in U.S. service to sink in the Attack on USNS Card, but as a Military Sea Transportation Service ship, she was not commissioned into the Navy, and had a civilian crew.)

== Design and description ==
A side profile of the design of Thetis Bay.

Bismarck Sea was a Casablanca-class escort carrier, the most numerous type of aircraft carriers ever built. Built to stem heavy losses during the Battle of the Atlantic, they came into service in late 1943, by which time the U-boat threat was already in retreat. Although some did see service in the Atlantic, the majority were utilized in the Pacific, ferrying aircraft, providing logistics support, and conducting close air support for the island-hopping campaigns. The Casablanca-class carriers were built on the standardized Type S4-S2-BB3 hull, a lengthened variant of the Doyen-class hull, and specifically designed to be mass-produced using welded prefabricated sections. This allowed them to be produced at unprecedented speeds: the final ship of her class, Munda, was delivered to the Navy just 101 days after the laying of her keel.

Bismarck Sea was 512 ft 3 in (156.13 m) long overall (490 ft (150 m) at the waterline), had a beam of 65 ft 2 in (19.86 m), and a draft of 20 ft 9 in (6.32 m). She displaced 8,188 long tons (8,319 t) standard, which increased to 10,902 long tons (11,077 t) with a full load. To carry out flight operations, the ship had a 257 ft (78 m) hangar deck and a 474 ft (144 m) flight deck. Her compact size necessitated the installation of an aircraft catapult at her bow, and there were two aircraft elevators to facilitate movement of aircraft between the flight and hangar deck: one each fore and aft.

She was powered by four Babcock & Wilcox Express D boilers that raised 285 psi (1,970 kPa) of steam at 577 °F (303 °C). The steam generated by these boilers fed two Skinner Unaflow reciprocating steam engines, delivering 9,000 hp (6,700 kW) to two propeller shafts. This allowed her to reach speeds of 19 kn (35 km/h; 22 mph), with a cruising range of 10,240 nmi (18,960 km; 11,780 mi) at 15 kn (28 km/h; 17 mph). For armament, one 5 in (127 mm)/38 caliber dual-purpose gun was mounted on the stern. Additional anti-aircraft defense was provided by eight Bofors 40 mm (1.57 in) anti-aircraft guns in single mounts and twelve Oerlikon 20 mm (0.79 in) cannons mounted around the perimeter of the deck. By 1945, Casablanca-class carriers had been modified to carry twenty Oerlikon cannons and sixteen Bofors guns; the doubling of the latter was accomplished by putting them into twin mounts. Sensors onboard consisted of a SG surface-search radar and a SK air-search radar.

During the Philippines campaign, she carried 16 Wildcat FM-2 fighters and 12 Avenger TBM-3 torpedo bombers, for a total of 28 aircraft. During the Iwo Jima campaign, she carried 19 FM-2 fighters, and 12 TBM-3 torpedo bombers, for a total of 31 aircraft. She was designed to accommodate 764 crew, but in wartime, her complement inevitably crept over that number. A reasonable estimate puts the number of crew typically on board a Casablanca-class escort carrier at around 910 to 916 men.

== Construction and service history ==
Her construction was awarded to Kaiser Shipbuilding Company, Vancouver, Washington under a Maritime Commission contract, on 18 June 1942, under the name Alikula Bay, as part of a tradition which named escort carriers after bays or sounds in Alaska. She was laid down on 31 January 1944, and was assigned the designation MC hull 1132. She was launched on 17 April 1944; sponsored by Mrs. Mabel C. Wallgren, wife of Senator Monrad Wallgren, under the name Alikula Bay. She was renamed Bismarck Sea on 16 May 1944, as part of a new naval policy which named subsequent Casablanca-class carriers after naval or land engagements, and she was transferred to the United States Navy and commissioned on 20 May, with Captain John L. Pratt in command.

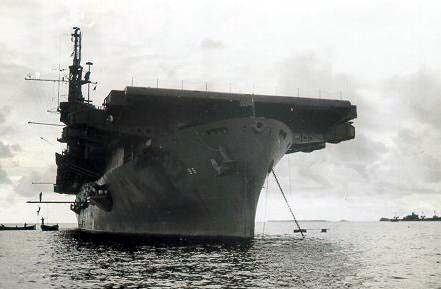
Bismarck Sea photographed in Majuro Atoll, July 1944.

After being commissioned, Bismarck Sea engaged in training exercises off the West Coast throughout June. On 1 July, she left San Pedro ferrying aircraft and pilots to Pearl Harbor. After unloading her aircraft, she loaded more aircraft and ferried them to the Marshall Islands, arriving at Majuro Atoll on 16 July. She then proceeded back to Pearl Harbor, carrying damaged aircraft, arriving on 29 July, along with her sister ship Saginaw Bay. Throughout August, she was stationed at San Diego for a four-week overhaul, where she received her combat air contingent, Composite Squadron (VC) 86. Between 7 September, and 16 October, she engaged in additional training exercises. She then steamed to Ulithi, Caroline Islands, to join Admiral Thomas C. Kinkaid's 7th Fleet on 1 November. Between 14 and 23 November, she operated off Leyte and Mindanao in support of operations onboard Leyte. On 21 November, a Japanese aircraft made a strafing run along the carrier, but without inflicting any damage, and escaped to the northwest before it could be engaged.

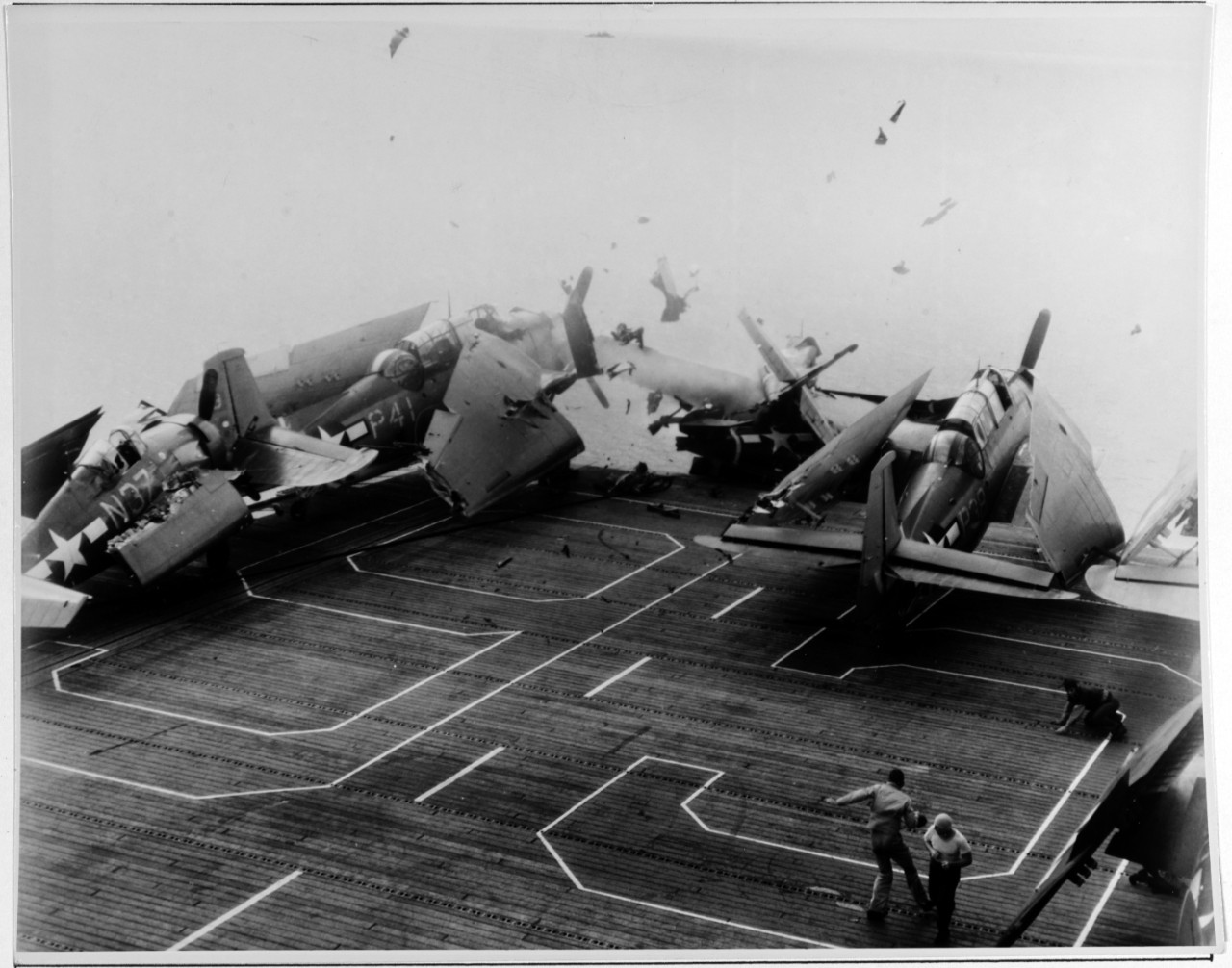
An FM2 (N-27) either missed or broke an arresting hook and crashed into planes parked on the bow, 19 December 1944

On 27 November, she arrived at Seeadler Harbor, New Guinea, to join Task Group 77.4, commanded by Rear Admiral Calvin T. Durgin. Throughout December, she conducted additional flight training and gunnery exercises. On 27 December, she left for Palau, to support the invasion of Luzon. On 5 January 1945, her task group sighted the Japanese destroyers Hinoki and Momi. Bennion engaged in a brief and inconclusive firefight with the destroyers, before disengaging to provide a screen.

Twenty-four fighters and sixteen torpedo bombers were sent against the destroyers, which Bismarck Sea supplemented the strike group with four Avengers and the same amount of Wildcats. The aerial strike force inflicted serious damage on both of the destroyers, sinking Momi. Hinoki, albeit damaged, was able to escape into Manila harbor, but she was subsequently sunk on 7 January by aircraft from Task Force 78. However, that same day, the escort carrier Ommaney Bay was sunk by a kamikaze aircraft. The task group then participated in the Invasion of Lingayen Gulf and supported air operations over Luzon until 17 January, when the task group proceeded towards Ulithi in preparation for the invasion of Iwo Jima. She departed Ulithi on 10 February, reorganized into Task Unit 52.2, still under the command of Durgin, and consisting of ten escort carriers and their destroyer screens, along with two escort carriers loosely tied into the task group on anti-submarine duties. On 16 February, she arrived off Iwo Jima to support the landings. The task group's aircraft conducted anti-submarine patrols, anti-aircraft patrols, and supported the first wave of troops on 19 February. Close air support, almost all of it derived from carriers, played a major role throughout the invasion.

=== Sinking ===
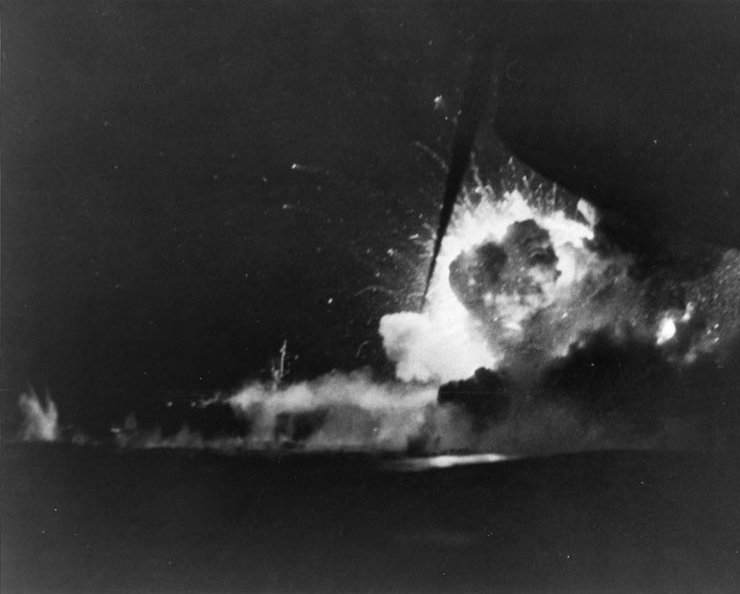
Bismarck Sea exploding after being hit by a kamikaze, photographed from USS Saginaw Bay

On 16 February, Vice-Admiral Kimpei Teroaka authorized the formation of a kamikaze special attack unit to counter the imminent landings on Iwo Jima. The kamikaze force consisted of thirty-two aircraft in total, and on the early morning of 21 February, they departed from Katori Naval Air Base, in Asahi, Chiba. They refueled at Hachijō-jima, and proceeded towards the U.S. naval contingent surrounding Iwo Jima, arriving near sunset.

When the kamikazes arrived, Bismarck Sea was performing routine close air support with the rest of Task Group 52.2. At the time, the escort carrier task group, having split in two, consisted of Bismarck Sea, her sister ships Makin Island, Lunga Point, Saginaw Bay, Rudyerd Bay, and Anzio, along with a destroyer contingent. The task group was steaming approximately twenty-one miles (34 km) east of Iwo Jima. At 17:30, the aircraft on Bismarck Sea were scrambled to deal with incoming planes, which turned out to be friendly. After recovering her planes, she found it necessary to take on three planes from other carriers and, due to the lack of deck space, to shelter four of her fighters below-decks without emptying their fuel tanks, a decision which would later prove disastrous. This brought the number of aircraft aboard the carrier to thirty-seven aircraft: 19 FM-2 fighters, 15 TBM-3 torpedo bombers, 2 OY-1 reconnaissance aircraft, and a F6F Hellcat fighter. At 18:45, the task group spotted the Japanese planes headed for them, when a Mitsubishi G4M made a dive towards Lunga Point. Gunners from Bismarck Sea shot it down. At 18:46, five Nakajima B6Ns dove towards Lunga Point. All four of the kamikazes missed with their torpedoes, and none of them made successful contact with Lunga Point, albeit the third kamikaze's wreckage skidded across the carrier's deck, sparking a brief gasoline fire. Damage to Lunga Point was minimal, and eleven of her crew were wounded. There were no fatalities, and she was able to continue operating in support of troops on Iwo Jima.

The fifth plane, however, switched targets, and proceeded towards Bismarck Sea. At one thousand yards (910 m), it was spotted by, and engaged by gunners aboard Bismarck Sea. However, despite the heavy gunfire, which damaged the plane, it quickly approached Bismarck Sea from the starboard side at a low angle, which the anti-aircraft guns could not depress sufficiently to fire at. The plane plowed in under the first 40 mm gun (aft), crashing through the hangar deck and striking the ship's magazines. At the time of the crash, the aircraft elevator was in operation, and nearly up to the flight deck, when its cables were cut by the kamikaze, causing the platform to drop onto the hangar deck with a tremendous amount of force. The force of the explosion distributed munitions, including torpedoes, across the deck, and started a fire. The ship's steering was also rendered dysfunctional by the blast. The sprinkler system and the water curtains were inoperative, but the fire was nearly under control when about two minutes later, a second plane, likely attracted by the ship's glow against the darkness, approaching from the port side, struck the aft elevator shaft, exploding on impact, killing the majority of the fire-fighting party and destroying the fire fighting salt-water distribution system, thus preventing any further damage control. The second plane detonated amongst the four fighters which were sheltered belowdecks, and the fighters, with full gasoline tanks, quickly turned the fire into a conflagration, enveloping the entire aft side of the ship.

When munitions on board the ship began to detonate, and with no firefighting equipment operational, the situation quickly deteriorated. At 19:00, the crew assembled at their "abandon ship" locations, and the engines were cut. Captain John L. Pratt issued the order to abandon ship at 19:05. As the crew abandoned ship, a large explosion, likely from the detonation of the torpedoes within the hangar deck, rocked the ship. This explosion tore much of the aft-end of the ship to shreds, and she quickly acquired a list to the starboard. The majority of the crew made it off the ship in the next 30 minutes. At 20:07, the ship's island detached from the hull and slid into the water. Two hours after the dual kamikaze attacks, at 21:15, Bismarck Sea sank with the loss of 318 men, and was the last US Navy aircraft carrier to be lost during World War II. Many casualties were inflicted once the crew abandoned ship, through hypothermia, choppy seas, and Japanese aircraft strafing the survivors. Three destroyers and three destroyer escorts rescued survivors over the next 12 hours, between them saving a total of 605 officers and men from her crew of 923. The destroyer escort Edmonds directed the rescue operations of the remaining hands, in spite of darkness, heavy seas and continuing air attacks, rescuing a majority of the surviving crew. Thirty of Edmonds' own crew went over the side to bring the wounded and exhausted carrier men to safety. Edmonds hauled up 378 men, the destroyer escort Lawrence C. Taylor retrieved 136 men, and the destroyer Helm recovered 39 survivors. Survivors were then transferred to the attack transports Dickens and Highlands.

The special attack unit which struck on 21 February, in addition to sinking Bismarck Sea, also heavily damaged Saratoga, Keokuk, and slightly damaged Lunga Point, LST-477, and LST-809. Bismarck Sea was the only ship to sink as a result of the attacks and was struck from the Navy List on 30 March; to date, she is the last US aircraft carrier in commission lost due to enemy action. The kamikaze attacks killed 43 Japanese in total.

== See also ==
- List of U.S. Navy ship losses in World War II

== Sources ==
=== Online Sources ===
- "Bismarck Sea". Dictionary of American Naval Fighting Ships. Naval History and Heritage Command. 6 February 2006.
- "Edmonds". Dictionary of American Naval Fighting Ships. Naval History and Heritage Command. 21 October 2005.
- "Kaiser Vancouver, Vancouver WA". www.ShipbuildingHistory.com. 27 November 2010. Archived from the original on 16 June 2019.
- "Katori Air Base Monument, Asahi City, Chiba Prefecture". www.kamikazeimages.net. Archived from the original on 23 June 2019.
- "World Aircraft Carriers List: US Escort Carriers, S4 Hulls". Hazegray.org. 14 December 1998. Archived from the original on 19 November 2021.
- Hoppe, Jon (April 2021). "The Attack on the USNS Card". Naval History. Annapolis, Maryland: United States Naval Institute.

=== Bibliography ===
- Adcock, Al (1996), Escort Carriers in Action - Warships No. 9, Carrollton, Texas: Squadron/Signal Publications, ISBN 9780897473569
- Brown, David (1995), Warship Losses of World War Two, Annapolis, Maryland: Naval Institute Press, ISBN 978-1557509147
- Chesneau, Robert; Gardiner, Robert (1980), Conway's All the World's Fighting Ships 1922–1946, London, England: Naval Institute Press, ISBN 9780870219139
- Fischer, Perry; Gray, Brooks (1994), Blacks and Whites-together Through Hell: (U.S. Marines in World War II), Turlock, California: Millsmont Publishing, ISBN 9780962325717
- Friedman, Norman (1983), U.S. Aircraft Carriers: An Illustrated Design History, Annapolis, Maryland: Naval Institute Press, ISBN 9780870217395
- Rielly, Robin (2010), Kamikaze Attacks of World War II: A Complete History of Japanese Suicide Strikes on American Ships, by Aircraft and Other Means, Jefferson, North Carolina: McFarland & Company, ISBN 9780786457724
- Smith, Peter (2014), Kamikaze: To Die for the Emperor, Barnsley, England: Pen and Sword Books, ISBN 9781473847828
- Ross, Al (1993), The Escort Carrier Gambier Bay, Anatomy of the Ship, London, England: Conway Maritime Press, ISBN 9781557502353
- Y'Blood, William (2012), The Little Giants: U.S. Escort Carriers Against Japan, Annapolis, Maryland: Naval Institute Press, ISBN 9781612512471
