= The Milpitas Monster =

- Directed by: Robert L. Burrill
- Written by: David E. Boston
- Story by: Robert L. Burrill; David R. Kottas
- Starring: Doug Hagdahl; Krazy George Henderson; Bill Guest; Priscilla House
- Narrated by: Paul Frees
- Edited by: Robert L. Burrill
- Music by: Robert R. Berry Jr.
- Release date: May 21, 1976 (United States)
- Running time: 80 minutes
- Country: United States
- Language: English
- Budget: $11,000 (estimated)

The Milpitas Monster (alternately known as The Mutant Beast) is a 1976 independent monster movie directed by Robert L. Burrill. It began as a short film by Burrill, but expanded to a feature once he began receiving financial support from local business in Milpitas, California, US. The crew of the film consisted of an ensemble of Burrill's photography students over the years at Samuel Ayer High School. The cast was almost entirely made up of Milpitas locals; with the exception of cameos by Bob Wilkins and Krazy George Henderson, and opening narration by Paul Frees.

== Plot ==
When a landfill is overfull, and pollution reaches its maximum, a monster is born. Made from garbage and bearing a resemblance to a giant humanoid fly in a gas mask, the Milpitas Monster has an uncontrollable desire to consume large quantities of garbage cans. Some high school students find out about the monster and attempt to destroy it.

== Release ==
=== Theatrical release ===
The Milpitas Monster premiered in Milpitas, California on May 21, 1976.

== Reception ==
The Milpitas Monster was largely ignored by mainstream critics upon its release. Jeffrey Frentzen of Cinefantastique wrote in his review of the film, "Despite its inverse homages glorifying the grade-Z monster flicks, The Milpitas Monster is still more than just another lousy horror show." However, he also noted the film's inherent charm, calling it "An offbeat, welcome diversion". Joseph Ziemba from Bleeding Skull gave the film a negative review, writing, "Crude effects, both visually and audibly, walk hand-in-hand with people just hanging out and being themselves. Boredom sets in…then disappears…then sets in again. Beyond all of that, Milpitas is an earnest portrait of an entire community having good clean fun in Smalltown, USA during the mid-1970s."

== Legacy ==
The Milpitas Monster was screened annually in Milpitas from 1976 to 2024. A 50th anniversary screening is set to take place on the 30th of October, 2026. The re-runs of The Milpitas Monster were organized by Burrill himself through his website: milpitasmonster.com.
