= George R. Henderson =

American naval officer (1893–1964)

George Henderson
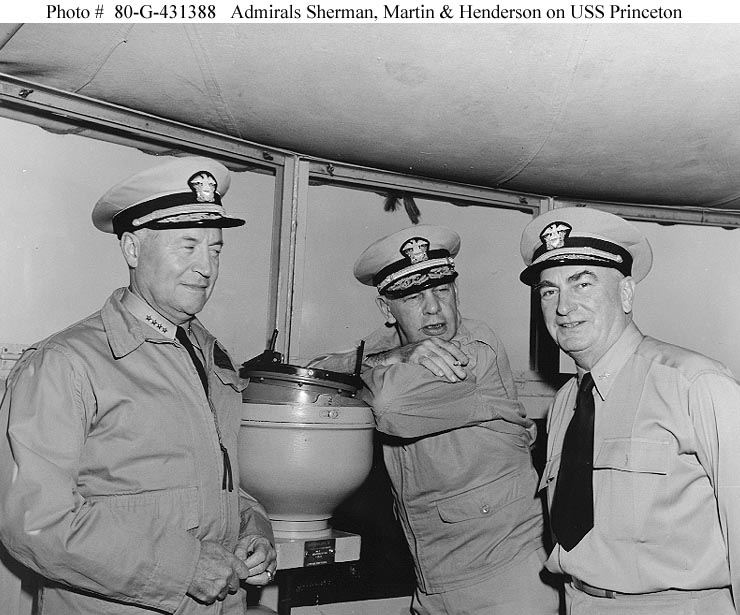
- Rear Admiral George R. Henderson (right), Commander Carrier Division Five, on board USS Princeton, off the Korean coast.
- Born: July 6, 1893; Pawtucket, Rhode Island, U.S.
- Died: November 29, 1964 (aged 71)
- Military career
- Allegiance: United States of America
- Branch: United States Navy
- Service years: 1917-1954
- Rank: Vice Admiral
- Commands: USS Princeton (CVL-23); Carrier Divisions 28, 5, and 25
- Conflicts: World War I World War II; Korean War
- Awards: Navy Distinguished Service Medal; Legion of Merit (6)

George Raymond Henderson (July 6, 1893 – November 29, 1964) was a vice admiral in the United States Navy.

== Biography ==
Henderson was born in on July 6, 1893, in Pawtucket, Rhode Island. He graduated from the University of Maine in 1916 and was a member of the Theta Chi fraternity.

== Naval Aviator ==
On July 17, 1917, he entered the Naval Reserve Flying Corps as a Landsman/Aviation Machinist's Mate at Syracuse, New York. Landsman was a designation given to enlistees prior to boot camp during World War I. The rank existed from 1838 to 1921. Upon entry he received ground school training at the Massachusetts Institute of Technology. In 1918 he received elementary flight training at Naval Air Station Pensacola, Florida, and was designated Naval Aviator HTA (Heavier-Than-Air) #909. Upon completion of advanced flight training he was commissioned as an ensign in the U.S. Naval Reserve.

On January 6, 1922, he was transferred to the regular Navy in the grade of lieutenant. After flight training he was assigned to Aircraft Squadrons Atlantic in June 1922. Here he set 10 world records for seaplane performance at the Naval Air Show in Bayshore Park, Maryland, on October 25, 1924. In a PN-7 flying boat equipped with two Wright T-2 engines, Henderson set four records for speed over 100 and 200 kilometers with loads of 250 and 500 kilograms, all at 78.507 m.p.h; and four records with a useful load of 1,000 kilograms with a speed of 78.507 m.p.h. for 100 and 200 kilometers, a distance record of 248.55 miles and a duration record of 5 hours, 28 minutes, 43 seconds. In November 1924 he was assigned as Chief Pilot of the Navy Test Board. He later established a world altitude record of 22,178 feet for Class C-2 seaplanes with useful load on April 14, 1927. By late 1927 he served in VT Squadron 3, Aircraft Squadrons Scouting and in Lexington (CV-2) in December 1927.

== 1930 to 1941 ==
In 1930 Henderson served at the Bureau of Naval air (BuAir). He then reported to the Langley (CV-1) in July 1932. The following year he was assigned as engineer officer on Staff of Commander Aircraft, Base Force in May 1933. In June 1935 he served at Naval Air Station Hampton Roads and then back to sea duty as navigator of the aircraft tender Wright (AV-1) in June 1937. He was soon assigned as commanding officer of Patrol Wing FOUR and finished out he 1930s at the Office of Chief of Naval Operations in June 1938.

== World War II ==
Prior to the commencement of World War II Henderson was fitting out the aircraft carrier Hornet (CV-8) at Newport News, Virginia, and was serving as executive officer when it was placed in commission on October 20, 1941. On April 18, 1942, Henderson was aboard Hornet when she participated in the Doolittle Raid against military and industrial targets in the Japanese home islands. After his tour on Hornet he served a short stint as Chief of Staff and Air to Commander Patrol Wing Two in June 1942.

Promoted to captain, Henderson fitted out and commanded the new carrier Princeton (CV-23) which was commissioned at Philadelphia Navy Yard in Camden, New Jersey, in February 1943. Following shakedown in the Caribbean, she was reclassified CVL-23 on July 15, 1943. Princeton participated in the First and Second Rabaul Air Strikes, on November 5 and 11, 1943, severely damaging many enemy combatant ships in Rabaul harbor. By January 1944 Henderson was serving as Commander Aircraft, Munda and Commander Fleet Air Wing One. Here he developed a successful system of combined air and surface operations that annihilated a Japanese barge fleet in the Solomon Islands and Bismarck Archipelago, and severely damaged numerous shore installations. He also initiated the rescue of many downed aircraft crews, often in enemy waters and under heavy fire from enemy shore batteries.

In July 1944 Henderson was promoted to rear admiral and took command of Carrier Division 28 with his flag in the escort carrier Saginaw Bay (CVE-82). Here he directed his ships and squadrons in vigorous aerial offensives against heavily defended enemy bases. Between September 1944 and early 1945 he successively participated in the Invasion of Palau, Battle of Leyte Gulf, and Invasion of Lingayen Gulf, planning and executing full air coverage of approaching and retiring convoys under extremely hazardous conditions, despite repeated attacks by hostile aircraft. At Leyte Gulf his forces departed the area at 1645 on October 24 and thus did not participate in the Battle off Samar.

In February 1945 he took command of Carrier Division 25 with his flag in Saginaw Bay for the Invasion of Iwo Jima. In late March 1945 he moved his flag to the escort carrier Makin Island (CVE-93) for the Invasion of Okinawa. As the war was winding down in August 1945 Henderson was serving ashore again as Commander Fleet Air, Quonset Point, Rhode Island.

== Post war ==
After the war Henderson served as Commandant of Naval Operating Base, Bermuda, in May 1946. His next assignment was as Chief of Staff to Commander U.S. Naval Forces, Eastern Atlantic and Mediterranean in October 1947 and later served as the Deputy Commander in Chief of the same command in October 1948.

== Korean War ==
In August 1950 shortly after the start of the Korean War, Henderson was serving as Commander Fleet Air, Japan with added duty as Commander Naval Air Bases, Japan. Here he was responsible for supplying logistic support for operating squadrons, maintenance units, tenders and bases in the Japan-Korea area in an important contribution to the successful prosecution of the Korean Campaign. He assumed command of Carrier Division 5 in May 1951 and as Commander of Task Force 77 during operations in Korea from May to August 1951. With his flag in Princeton (CV-37), his task force exerted relentless pressure against the enemy, provided effective close air support for ground troops, inflicted extensive damage upon the enemy by daring air strikes, and constantly interdicted their key communication systems. In October 1951 he served as Commander of Naval Air Bases, 11th & 12th Naval Districts headquartered in San Diego, California, and in May 1953 assumed additional duties as Commandant of the Eleventh Naval District, remaining at that post into September of that year.

== Retirement and death ==
Henderson transferred to the Retired List of the Navy on August 1, 1954, as a rear admiral, designator 1313. He was advanced to rank of vice admiral on the basis of combat awards, after 37 years of naval service in 3 wars. Among his awards were the Navy Distinguished Service Medal, Legion of Merit (6) with combat V’s, the Purple Heart, and Presidential Unit Citation. He died on November 29, 1964, at the age of 71.

Vice Admiral Henderson was one of two World War II naval aviator admirals to have gone from seaman to admiral.

== Bibliography ==
- Cox, Robert Jon (2010). The Battle Off Samar: Taffy III at Leyte Gulf (5th ed.). Wakefield, Michigan: Agogeebic Press. ISBN 978-0-9822-3903-2.
- Field, James A. (1962). "Chapter 10: The Second Six Months". History of United States Naval Operations: Korea. U.S. Govt. Printing Office. Part 3. April–May 1951: the Communist Spring Offensive. OCLC 1131205 – via Naval History and Heritage Command.
- Martin, Dwight (June 25, 1951). "War at Sea: Carrier Action". Time. pp. 75–83.
- Tuohy, William (May 15, 2007). America's Fighting Admirals: Winning the War at Sea in World War II. Zenith Press. p. 12. ISBN 978-0-7603-2985-6. OCLC 85829410. OL 8011866M.
- Y'Blood, William T. (1987). The Little Giants - U.S. Escort Carriers Against Japan. Annapolis, Maryland: United States Naval Institute. ISBN 0-87021-275-3. OCLC 15489283. OL 2379356M.
