= G. D. Henderson =

Scottish historian and minister

George David Henderson (26 March 1888 – 28 May 1957) was a Scottish historian and a minister of the Church of Scotland.

== Early life and career ==
He was born in Ayr to Rev. Robert Henderson, who was minister of Flowerhill manse in Airdrie. He was educated at the High School of Glasgow and the universities of Berlin and Jena. In 1910 he was awarded a first class honours MA in philosophy from Glasgow University. He also received from Glasgow a MB (1914), a D.Litt. (1931) and a DD (1935). Paris University awarded him a DTheol. in 1954.

Henderson worked as an assistant minister in Edinburgh and Hamilton before he was appointed minister of Greenock in 1916. During the First World War he was chaplain to the forces in Mesopotamia, a post he held until 1920. From 1922 to 1924 he served in Glasgow Patrick St. Mary's and in 1924 he became regius professor of divinity and church history at the University of Aberdeen. In 1924 he married Jennie Holmes McCulloch and they had two sons; Robert Henderson (physician) and George D. S. Henderson. His grandchildren include Katherine Henderson (physician).

Henderson's historical writings focused primarily on Scottish Church history. In 1937 Cambridge University Press published a collection of his essays under the title Religious Life in Seventeenth-Century Scotland. His work on the Disruption of 1843, Heritage: A Study of the Disruption, was published in its centenary year. Henderson's 1951 volume The Claims of the Church of Scotland was written after he received a request from Scottish churchmen to write a Scottish equivalent of The Claims of the Church of England by Cyril Garbett, the Archbishop of York. Henderson's biography of the 18th-century Scottish writer Andrew Michael Ramsay was published in 1952.

Henderson also served in the Church of Scotland; he was Moderator of the Synod of Aberdeen, Moderator of Aberdeen Presbytery, and convener of the Church of Scotland Colonial and Continental Committee.

Henderson was Moderator of the General Assembly of the Church of Scotland in 1955.

After his death, The Scottish Historical Review said that Henderson's "contributions to the history of the Church were always distinguished for their wide scholarship and critical judgment clothed with a warm humanity". The Times stated that Henderson was "one of the greatest Church historians Scotland ever produced, and in almost all his prolific writings was concerned to maintain and expand the Presbyterian doctrine of worship and government as that had developed down four centuries". A collection of his essays, The Burning Bush: Studies in Scottish Church History, was published posthumously.

== Works ==
=== Books ===
- The Scottish Ruling Elder (London: James Clarke, 1935).
- The Scots Confession, 1560, and Negative Confession, 1581, introduction by G. D. Henderson (Edinburgh: Church of Scotland, Committee on Publications, 1937).
- Religious Life in Seventeenth-Century Scotland (Cambridge: Cambridge University Press, 1937).
- The Kirk Through the Centuries (Edinburgh: Church of Scotland, Committee on Publications, 1937).
- The Church of Scotland: A Short History (Edinburgh: Church of Scotland Youth Committee, 1939).
- Heritage: A Study of the Disruption (Edinburgh and London: Oliver and Boyd, 1943).
- The Founding of Marischal College, Aberdeen (Aberdeen University Studies, No. 123, Aberdeen University Press 1947).
- Church and Ministry: A Study in Scottish Experience (London: Hodder and Stoughton, 1951).
- The Claims of the Church of Scotland (London: Hodder and Stoughton, 1951).
- Chevalier Ramsay (London: Thomas Nelson, 1952).
- Presbyterianism (Aberdeen: Aberdeen University Press, 1954).
- The Burning Bush: Studies in Scottish Church History (Edinburgh: Saint Andrew Press, 1957).

=== Articles ===
- 'Scotland and the Synod of Dort', Nederlands archief voor kerkgeschiedenis/Dutch Review of Church History, Nieuwe Serie, Vol. 24 (1931), pp. 1–24.
- 'Review: Knox's History of the Reformation', The Scottish Historical Review, Vol. 29, No. 108, Part 2 (Oct., 1950), pp. 182–188.
- 'Priesthood of Believers', Scottish Journal of Theology, Vol. 7 (1954), pp. 1–15.
