= George Henderson (footballer, born 1873) =

Scottish footballer

Personal information
- Full name: George Henderson
- Date of birth: 15 December 1873
- Place of birth: High Blantyre, Scotland
- Position: Wing half

Senior career*
| Years | Team | Apps | (Gls) |
| 1891–1892 | Coatbridge St Patrick's | | |
| 1892–1893 | Burnbank Athletic | | |
| 1893–1895 | Motherwell | 5 | (4) |
| 1895–1897 | Airdrieonians | 34 | (2) |
| 1897–1898 | Preston North End | 2 | (0) |
| 1898–1900 | Swindon Town | | |
| 1900–1901 | Millwall Athletic | | |
| 1901–1906 | Nottingham Forest | 103 | (6) |
| 1906 | Hamilton Academical | 8 | (0) |
| 1906 | Girvan Athletic | | |
| Total | | 152 | (12) |
- * Club domestic league appearances and goals

George Henderson (15 December 1873– unknown) was a Scottish footballer who played in the Football League for Nottingham Forest and Preston North End.
