= George D. S. Henderson =

Art historian, medievalist, writer

George David Smith Henderson (born 1931 in Aberdeen, Scotland) is a British art historian, author, and Emeritus Professor of Medieval Art at the University of Cambridge. He is a Fellow of The Society of Antiquaries of London (elected January 1975) and a member of the Association of Art Historians. He was awarded the Reginald Taylor Prize by the British Archaeological Association in 1962 for his paper "The Sources of the Genesis Cycle at St.-Savin-sur-Gartempe".

== Early life ==
Professor Henderson is the son of George David Henderson (1888-1957), a Church of Scotland minister and an ecclesiastical historian with a number of books to his name, and Janet Henderson (née Smith).

== Education and academic career ==
Educated at the University of Aberdeen (BA, 1953), University of London (MA, 1956) and Cambridge (MA & PhD, 1961), George Henderson went on to have a long career in academia. He was a Research Fellow at the Barber Institute of Fine Arts, University of Birmingham, 1960-1961, a Lecturer in the History of Art at the University of Manchester, 1963-1966, and a Lecturer in Art History at the University of Edinburgh, 1966-1973.

Henderson was appointed to Cambridge University as a Lecturer in the History of Art and Fellow of Downing College in 1974, having previously worked at Downing College for a brief period in the early 1960s.

Henderson was a Visiting Lecturer at the Courtauld Institute of Art and has donated photographs to the Conway Library which are currently being digitised as part of the Courtauld Connects project.

In 1984 he was a founding member of the steering committee of the Harlaxton Medieval Symposium, an annual event held at Harlaxton Manor started by Pamela Tudor-Craig.

== Awards and honours ==
A book to honour his work was published in 2001, New Offerings, Ancient Treasures: Studies in Medieval Art for George Henderson, edited by Paul Binski and William Noel and he is also recognised in The Grove Encyclopedia of Medieval Art and Architecture as being an influence on the art historian and medievalist Michael Camille.

== Personal life ==
George Henderson is married to Isabel Henderson OBE, Fellow Emerita of Newnham College, Cambridge and an eminent academic in her own right. The Guardian, when reviewing the book she co-authored with her husband, The Art of the Picts: Sculpture and Metalwork in Early Medieval Scotland, described her as ‘the great doyenne of Pictish art’. They have two children: Katherine Henderson (physician) and Matthew Henderson, a British Diplomat and Orientalist.

== Selected works ==
- Gothic Art and Civilisation, London: Folio Society, 2004, c1967.
- Chartres, Harmondsworth: Penguin, 1968.
- Early Medieval Art and Civilisation, London: The Folio Society, 2004, c1972.
- Early Medieval, Harmondsworth: Penguin, 1977, ISBN 0140214208.
- Gothic, Harmondsworth: Penguin, 1978, ISBN 0140208062.
- Bede and the Visual Arts, Newcastle upon Tyne: J & P. Bealls, 1980.
- Losses and Lacunae in Early Insular Art. University of York, 1982, ISBN 0900657669.
- Studies in English Bible Illustration, London: Pindar, 1985, ISBN 0907132278
- From Durrow to Kells: the Insular Gospel-books, London: Thames and Hudson, 1987, ISBN 0500234744.
- Vision and Image in Early Christian England, Cambridge: Cambridge University Press, 1999, ISBN 0521551307.
- The Art of the Picts: Sculpture and Metalwork in Early Medieval Scotland, (with Isabel Henderson), London: Thames & Hudson, 2004, ISBN 0500238073.
