= George Henderson (footballer, born 1902) =

Scottish footballer

Personal information
- Full name: George Brown Henderson
- Date of birth: 9 January 1902
- Place of birth: Kelty, Scotland
- Date of death: 18 March 1975
- Height: 6 ft 0 in (1.83 m)
- Position: Defender

Senior career*
| Years | Team | Apps | (Gls) |
| 1923–1924 | Kelty Athletic | | |
| 1924–1925 | St Bernard's | 87 | (2) |
| 1925–1929 | Sunderland | 45 | (1) |
| 1929–1937 | Barnsley | 258 | (11) |
| 1938 | Cowdenbeath | 1 | (0) |
- * Club domestic league appearances and goals

George Brown Henderson (9 January 1902 – 18 March 1975) was a Scottish professional footballer who played as a defender for St Bernard's, Sunderland and Barnsley.
