= Wave (audience) =

Synchronized action by a stadium audience

Australia vs Ireland international rules game 2014 at Subiaco Oval crowd wave

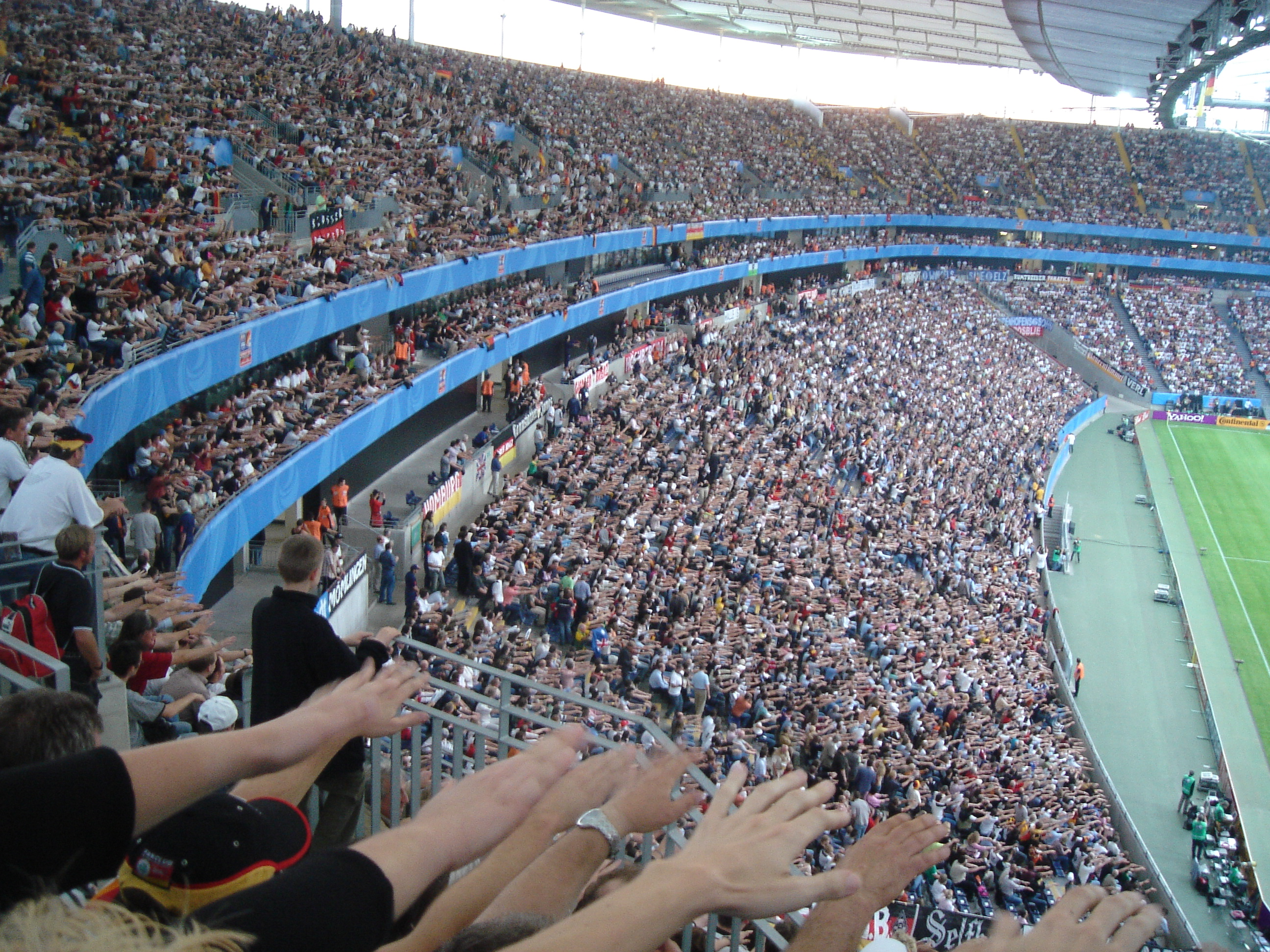
Crowd wave at the 2005 FIFA Confederations Cup

The wave (also Mexican wave in some countries outside North America) is a type of metachronal rhythm achieved in a populated stadium or other large seated venue, when successive groups of spectators briefly stand and raise their arms. Immediately upon stretching to full height, the spectator returns to the usual seated position.

The result is a wave of standing spectators that travels through the crowd, even though individual spectators never move away from their seats. In many large arenas the crowd is seated in a contiguous circuit all the way around the sport field, and so the wave is able to travel continuously around the arena; in discontiguous seating arrangements, the wave can instead reflect back and forth through the crowd. When the gap in seating is narrow, the wave can sometimes pass through it. Usually only one wave crest will be present at any given time in an arena, although simultaneous, counter-rotating waves have been produced.

The wave first appeared in U.S. sports events in the late 1970s to early 1980s. Televised instances at many matches of the 1986 FIFA World Cup in Mexico brought it to a global audience and led to the name "Mexican wave" in English-speaking countries outside North America.

== Origins and variations ==
=== Krazy George Henderson ===
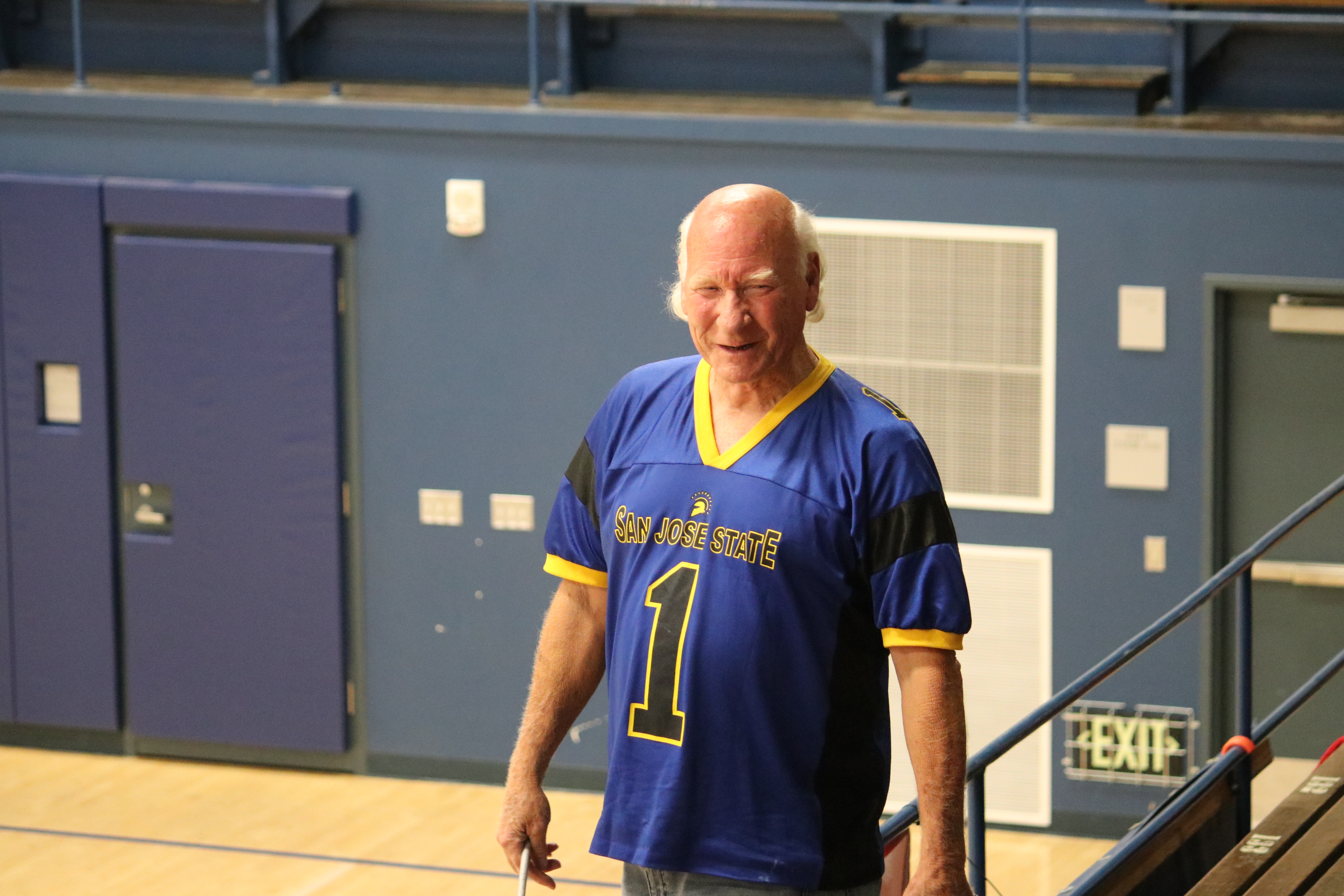
Krazy George cheering at a San Jose State women's volleyball game, 2018

On November 15, 1979, a stilted wave originated with a cheer routine led by Krazy George Henderson at a National Hockey League (NHL) game between the Colorado Rockies and Montreal Canadiens at McNichols Sports Arena in Denver, Colorado. Krazy George would lead a three word cheer, "Go! Rockies! Go!", chanted one word each, by three consecutive sections of the arena; that night, a fourth consecutive section then jumped up and cheered wildly. The Rockies' only had one brief appearance in the Stanley Cup playoffs during their existence, and games were poorly attended; the large empty spaces in the stands stymied Krazy George's attempts to produce a consistent run of cheers rippling around the arena. That same 1979–80 NHL season, Krazy George had also been hired to generate raucous cheers for the Edmonton Oilers, at Northlands Coliseum in Edmonton, Alberta. With complete sellouts of every game, and the first of many consecutive appearances in the Stanley Cup playoffs, Krazy George had an energized Edmonton fan base that immediately made the Wave a functional part of every home game. In Edmonton, his routine was to have one long side of the arena jump and cheer, then have the opposite side respond; one night, there was a delayed response from one section of fans at the end of one side, leading to them jumping to their feet a few seconds later than the wall of sections beside them. The next section of fans, rounding the corner to the not-normally involved short side/end sections, followed suit and the first wave completely circled the Coliseum of its own accord. In The Game of Our Lives, a 1981 book about the Oilers' 1980–81 season, journalist Peter Gzowski described this routine, which did not yet have a name but was already a standard in Henderson's repertoire: "He will start a cheer in one corner and then roll it around the arena, with each section rising from its seat as it yells."

While the Wave could sometimes be seen on television at Edmonton Oilers games – and soon other NHL cities, it was a Wave that Krazy George led on October 15, 1981, at a Major League Baseball game in Oakland, California, that became the earliest available intentional video recording of a Wave. This wave was broadcast on TV, and George has used a videotape of the event to bolster his claim as the inventor of the wave. On October 31, 1981, the Wave spread to football, during a game at Husky Stadium in Seattle, Washington, between the Washington Huskies and Stanford Cardinal; the cheer continued to appear during the rest of that year's football season.

With the evolution from the stilted start in Denver, through the self-generating complete Waves in Edmonton, and the available video documentation from Oakland, a number of sports arenas and their fans take credit for their contribution to the accidental creation of the Wave over a short period of time, all with the involvement of Krazy George Henderson.

=== University of Washington ===
Robb Weller, a cheerleader at the University of Washington from 1968 to 1972 and later co-host of the television show Entertainment Tonight, indicated in September 1984 that the school's early 1970s cheerleading squad developed a version of the wave that went from the bottom to top, instead of side to side, as a result of difficulties in getting the generally inebriated college audience members to timely raise and lower cards:

Actually ...there were two Waves. I was a cheerleader at the University of Washington from 1968 to 1972 when we started the first Wave. We tried to have card tricks but the kids would imbibe too much and the card tricks would get all goofed up; then we'd try card tricks with the kids using their bodies as cards and that wouldn't work. Finally we tried a Wave in the student section and it caught on but that Wave was different from this Wave. It would go from the bottom to top instead of side to side.

The first wave at the University of Washington's Husky Stadium occurred on Halloween 1981, at the prompting of Dave Hunter (Husky band trumpet player) and the visiting alumni cheerleader Weller. In 1982 Husky head coach Don James pointed to crowd noise from the wave as a competitive advantage when playing home games at Husky Stadium.

The wave had been picked up by fans at the nearby Kingdome prior to the Seattle Seahawks' first playoff appearance in 1983.

=== University of Michigan ===
On September 17, 1983, the Michigan Wolverines played the Huskies in Seattle and brought the wave back to Michigan Stadium in Ann Arbor. A letter to the sports editor of The New York Times claimed, "There are three reasons why the wave caught on at Michigan Wolverine games: It gave the fans something to do when the team was leading its opponent by 40 points, it was thrilling and exciting to see 105,000 people in the stands moving and cheering, and Bo Schembechler asked us not to do it." The fans responded to his request by doing more waves, including "Silent Waves" (standing and waving arms without cheering), "Shsh Waves" (replacing the cheering with a "shshing" sound), the "Fast Wave", the "Slow Wave", and two simultaneous waves traveling in opposite directions. The following spring, fans who had enjoyed the wave in Ann Arbor introduced it to the nearby Tiger Stadium in Detroit. The Tigers won baseball's World Series that year and appeared on many televised games throughout 1984, so people all over the US saw it.

=== Mexican Wave ===
On September 18, 1984, in the Monterrey metro area suburb of San Nicolas de los Garza, at the Estadio Universitario, the Mexico national team played a friendly match against Argentina, ending in a 1-1 draw. The wave was being done by college students who had learned the celebrations during college football matches. Former Mexico head coach Bora Milutinovic confessed that every time he visited another stadium around the world he always thought of the fans in Monterrey: "We played the unforgettable match against Argentina 1-1, when that famous 'Wave' began. Now, when I am in stadiums around the world and I see 'waves' where people express their joy at seeing good football, it always reminds me of the fans of the north."

== Global broadcasts ==
=== 1984 Olympic football final ===
The wave was broadcast internationally during the 1984 Olympic football (soccer) final between Brazil and France on August 11, when it was done among the 100,000 in attendance at the Rose Bowl in Pasadena, California.

=== 1986 FIFA World Cup in Mexico ===
Most sports historians agree that the wave began internationally during the 1986 FIFA World Cup in Mexico. It was broadcast to a global audience, and the wave was popularized worldwide after the tournament. This was the first time that most people living outside North America had seen the phenomenon. As a result, English speakers outside of North America call the phenomenon a "Mexican wave". Likewise in many languages like Polish, Serbian and Turkish, direct translation of the phrase Mexican Wave is used. In Germany, Italy, and other countries the wave is called "la ola" (or simply ola) from the Spanish word for "wave", while in Portuguese-speaking countries, such as Brazil, it is alternatively translated to a onda, more commonly [o] ondão (augmentative) or simply onda, but a ola is also used.

== Silent wave ==
A silent wave was created during a blind football match between Turkey and China during the 2024 Paris Paralympic Games. This wave was slow and silent to allow the players to hear the sound of the game.

== Current appearances ==
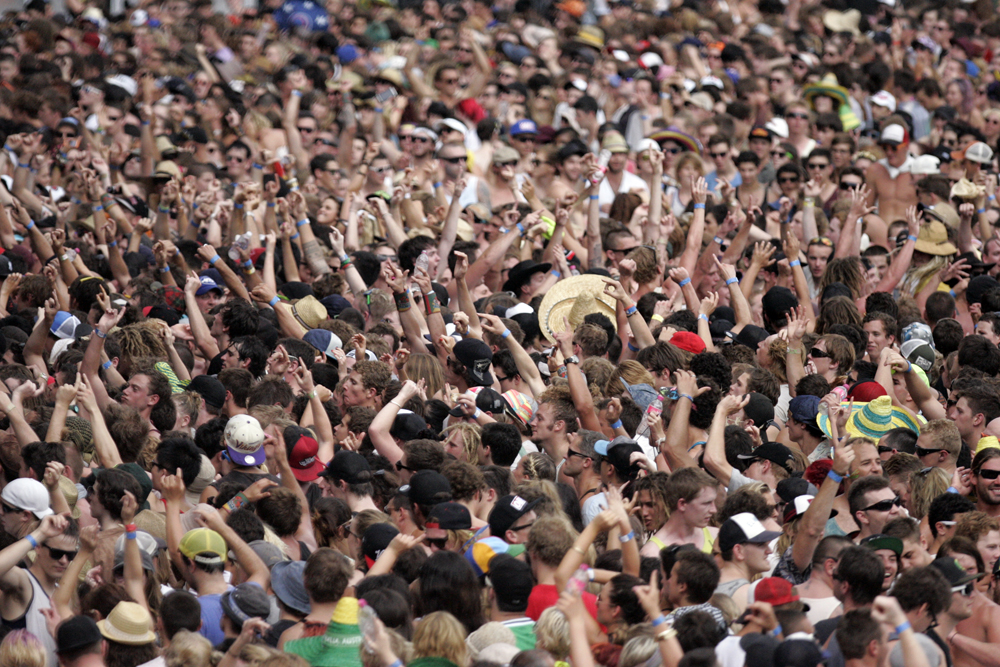
The wave performed at the 2013 Big Day Out music festival in Sydney, Australia

Today, the wave is often seen during sports events, sometimes during a lull in the action on the field when the spectators want to amuse themselves. There is some controversy as to when the wave is appropriate to perform during a sporting event. Many fans feel that the wave should not be performed in important situations during the game.

Prior to the redevelopment of the Melbourne Cricket Ground between 2002 and 2006, spectators seated in the Members' Stand (reserved for members of the Melbourne Cricket Club) would refuse to engage in the wave, and would be booed by other spectators at the ground, before the wave would resume on the other side of the stand. Sociologist John Carroll described the practice of "booing the Members" as dismissive of any claim to authority or superior social status on the members' part, although good-natured and based on the egalitarian nature of watching sports. (As a postscript to the "booing the Members" phenomenon, even when the Members stand was closed due to the reconstruction work, the crowd would still boo, despite the Members' stand being completely empty. When waves were banned (see below), large sections of the Members participated in the protest waves.) Such a feature is also observed at Lord's, another cricket ground, where the Members in that arena also rarely participate and are booed by the crowd.

Cricket Australia formally banned the wave at home games in 2007 on the grounds that liquids and other objects thrown in the air during the wave posed a danger. The move was not well-received and in some cases served to increase the prevalence of the wave at those games. In one such example, Adam Gilchrist, the Australian wicketkeeper, participated in the banned wave from the playing field.

=== Metrics ===
In 2002, Tamás Vicsek of the Eötvös Loránd University, Hungary along with his colleagues, analyzed videos of 14 waves at large Mexican football stadiums, developing a standard model of wave behavior (published in Nature). He found that it takes only the actions of a few dozen fans to trigger a wave. Once started, it usually rolls in a clockwise direction at a rate of about 12 m/s (39 ft/s; 43 km/h; 27 mph), or about 22 seats per second. At any given time the wave is about 15 seats wide. These observations appear to be applicable across different cultures and sports, though details vary in individual cases.

=== Records ===
During the 2010 Rally to Restore Sanity and/or Fear, an event hosted by comedy TV show hosts Jon Stewart and Stephen Colbert, about 210,000 people participated in a wave led by MythBusters hosts Jamie Hyneman and Adam Savage.

On 23 June 2019, during the Rocket League Championship Series (video game e-sports) Season 7 Finals at the Prudential Center in Newark, New Jersey, the audience set a new record for a longest continuous wave lasting for 28 minutes and 35 seconds. The previous record was 17 minutes and 14 seconds set by Tube and their fans at a concert at the Koshien Stadium in Nishinomiya, Japan on 23 September 2015.

== See also ==
- Card stunt
- Eh, puto (chant)
