= George Henderson (cartoonist) =

New Zealand cartoonist

George Duncan Henderson (1911–1985) was a New Zealand cartoonist. He signed his work 'Hen'. His work was published in the Christchurch Star, Timaru Herald, and Taranaki Daily News.
