= USS Makin Island (CVE-93) =

Casablanca-class escort carrier of the US Navy

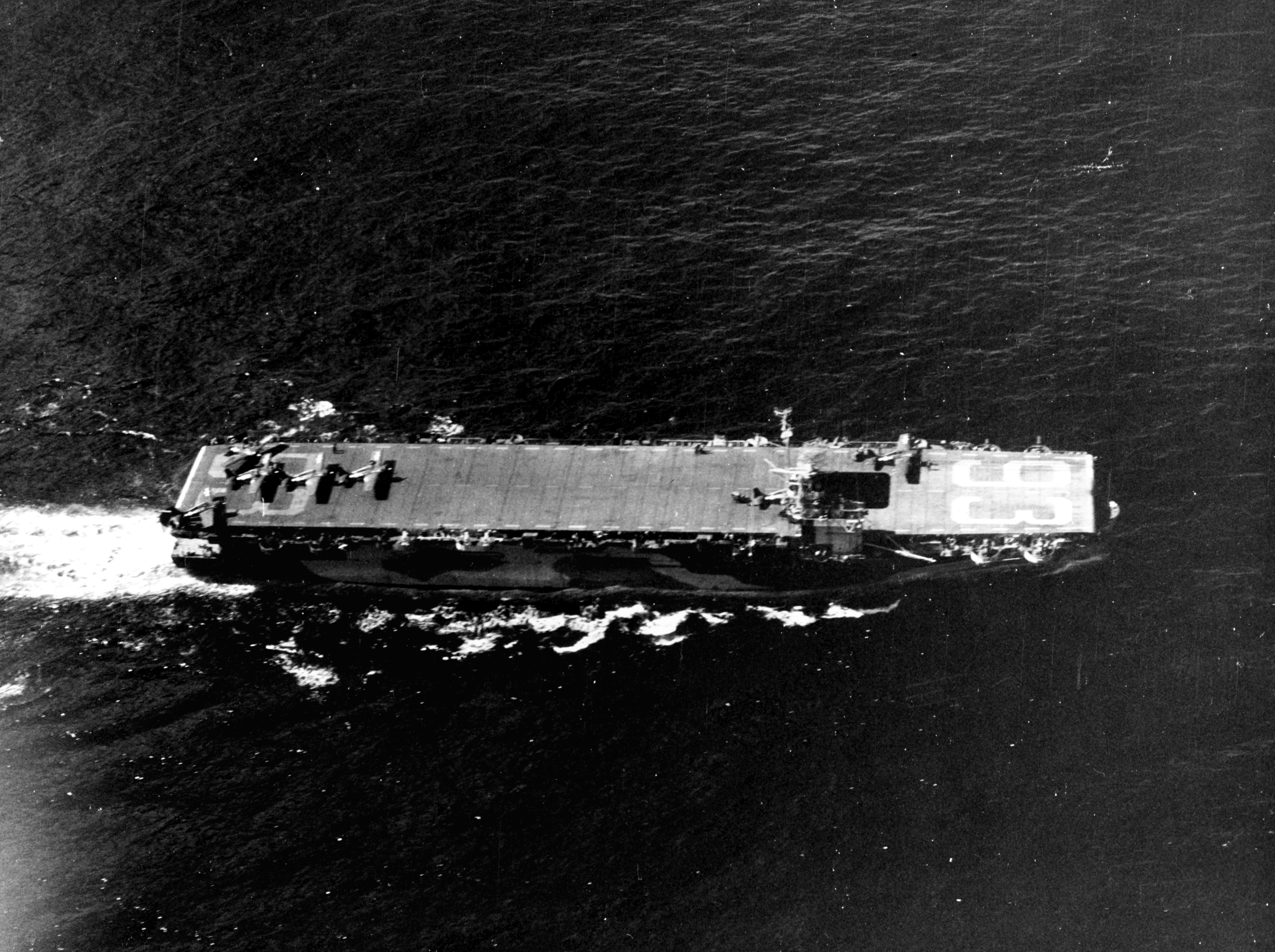
- USS Makin Island underway near Leyte, November 1944

History

United States
- Name: Makin Island
- Namesake: Raid on Makin Island
- Ordered: as a Type S4-S2-BB3 hull, MCE hull 1130
- Awarded: 18 June 1942
- Builder: Kaiser Shipyards
- Laid down: 12 January 1944
- Launched: 5 April 1944
- Commissioned: 9 May 1944
- Decommissioned: 19 April 1946
- Stricken: 11 July 1946
- Identification: Hull symbol: CVE-93
- Honors and awards: 5 battle stars
- Fate: Sold for scrapping 1 January 1947

General characteristics
- Class & type: Casablanca-class escort carrier
- Displacement: 8,188 long tons (8,319 t) (standard); 10,902 long tons (11,077 t) (full load)
- Length: 512 ft 3 in (156.13 m) (oa); 490 ft (150 m) (wl); 474 ft (144 m) (fd)
- Beam: 65 ft 2 in (19.86 m); 108 ft (33 m) (extreme width)
- Draft: 20 ft 9 in (6.32 m) (max)
- Installed power: 4 × Babcock & Wilcox boilers; 9,000 shp (6,700 kW)
- Propulsion: 2 × Skinner Unaflow reciprocating steam engines; 2 × screws
- Speed: 19 knots (35 km/h; 22 mph)
- Range: 10,240 nmi (18,960 km; 11,780 mi) at 15 kn (28 km/h; 17 mph)
- Complement: Total: 910 – 916 officers and men; Embarked Squadron: 50 – 56; Ship's Crew: 860
- Armament: As designed: 1 × 5 in (127 mm)/38 cal dual-purpose gun; 4 × twin 40 mm (1.57 in) Bofors anti-aircraft guns; 12 × 20 mm (0.79 in) Oerlikon anti-aircraft cannons; Varied, ultimate armament: 1 × 5 in (127 mm)/38 cal dual-purpose gun; 8 × twin 40 mm (1.57 in) Bofors anti-aircraft guns; 20 × 20 mm (0.79 in) Oerlikon anti-aircraft cannons
- Aircraft carried: 27
- Aviation facilities: 1 × catapult; 2 × elevators

Service record
- Part of: United States Pacific Fleet (1944–1946)
- Operations: Philippines campaign; Invasion of Iwo Jima; Battle of Okinawa; Operation Magic Carpet

USS Makin Island (CVE-93) was a Casablanca-class escort carrier of the United States Navy. She was named for the 1942 Makin raid, an early diversionary raid designed to distract from the Guadalcanal campaign and the Tulagi campaign. Launched in April 1944, and commissioned in May, she served in support of the Philippines campaign, the Invasion of Iwo Jima, and the Battle of Okinawa. Postwar, she participated in Operation Magic Carpet. She was decommissioned in April 1946, and ultimately sold for scrapping in January 1947.

== Design and description ==
A side profile of the design of Thetis Bay.

Makin Island was a Casablanca-class escort carrier, the most numerous type of aircraft carriers ever built. Built to stem heavy losses during the Battle of the Atlantic, they came into service in late 1943, by which time the U-boat threat was already in retreat. Although some did see service in the Atlantic, the majority were utilized in the Pacific, ferrying aircraft, providing logistics support, and conducting close air support for the island-hopping campaigns. The Casablanca-class carriers were built on the standardized Type S4-S2-BB3 hull, a lengthened variant of the Doyen-class hull, and specifically designed to be mass-produced using welded prefabricated sections. This allowed them to be produced at unprecedented speeds: the final ship of her class, Munda, was delivered to the Navy just 101 days after the laying of her keel.

Makin Island was 512 ft 3 in (156.13 m) long overall (490 ft (150 m) at the waterline), had a beam of 65 ft 2 in (19.86 m), and a draft of 20 ft 9 in (6.32 m). She displaced 8,188 long tons (8,319 t) standard, which increased to 10,902 long tons (11,077 t) with a full load. To carry out flight operations, the ship had a 257 ft (78 m) hangar deck and a 474 ft (144 m) flight deck. Her compact size necessitated the installation of an aircraft catapult at her bow, and there were two aircraft elevators to facilitate movement of aircraft between the flight and hangar deck: one each fore and aft.

She was powered by four Babcock & Wilcox Express D boilers that raised 285 psi (1,970 kPa) of steam at 577 °F (303 °C). The steam generated by these boilers fed two Skinner Unaflow reciprocating steam engines, delivering 9,000 hp (6,700 kW) to two propeller shafts. This allowed her to reach speeds of 19 kn (35 km/h; 22 mph), with a cruising range of 10,240 nmi (18,960 km; 11,780 mi) at 15 kn (28 km/h; 17 mph). For armament, one 5 in (127 mm)/38 caliber dual-purpose gun was mounted on the stern. Additional anti-aircraft defense was provided by eight Bofors 40 mm (1.57 in) anti-aircraft guns in single mounts and twelve Oerlikon 20 mm (0.79 in) cannons mounted around the perimeter of the deck. By 1945, Casablanca-class carriers had been modified to carry twenty Oerlikon cannons and sixteen Bofors guns; the doubling of the latter was accomplished by putting them into twin mounts. Sensors onboard consisted of a SG surface-search radar and a SK air-search radar.

Although Casablanca-class escort carriers were intended to function with a crew of 860 and an embarked squadron of 50 to 56, the exigencies of wartime often necessitated the inflation of the crew count. They were designed to operate with 27 aircraft, but the hangar deck could accommodate much more during transport or training missions.

During the Philippines campaign, she carried 15 FM-2 fighters, 9 TBM-3 torpedo bombers, and a TBM-3P photo reconnaissance plane, for a total of 25 aircraft. However, during the Invasion of Iwo Jima, she carried 20 FM-2 fighters and 12 TBM-3 torpedo bombers, for a total of 32 aircraft. During the Battle of Okinawa, she carried 16 FM-2 fighters and 11 TBM-3 torpedo bombers, for a total of 27 aircraft.

== Construction ==
The escort carrier was laid down on 12 January 1944 under a Maritime Commission contract, MC hull 1130, by Kaiser Shipbuilding Company, Vancouver, Washington. She was launched on 5 April 1944; sponsored by Mrs. B. B. Nichol; transferred to the United States Navy and commissioned on 9 May 1944 with a partial crew complement of 60 officers and 560 crewmen.

== Service history ==
Following commissioning, she underwent outfitting at Astoria, Oregon. On 31 May, she left, bound for Puget Sound, where munitions were loaded, and tests were conducted. On 8 June, she departed, traveling down to Naval Base San Diego, stopping at Naval Air Station Alameda to load more munitions and to refuel. Upon arriving in San Diego, she underwent a brief shakedown cruise, engaging in exercises off of Baja California. On 19 June, she set off on a transport mission, ferrying 78 aircraft and 236 men to Hawaii. After unloading her cargo in Pearl Harbor, she took on 70 aircraft, along with a marine squadron (VMO-155). She then proceeded onwards to Majuro Atoll, where she unloaded her planes. After leaving, she made stops at Kwajalein Atoll and Roi-Namur, where she took on wounded from the ongoing Battle of Saipan. She then returned to Pearl Harbor, where she loaded onboard Air Group 16, which had been recently detached from Lexington. After returning her aircraft cargo to San Diego, she sailed to Long Beach Naval Shipyard, where she underwent overhaul.

After finishing overhaul, she took on her aircraft contingent (VC-84), and on 16 August, she began exercises along the California coast. Exercises concluded on 5 September, with minor repairs being conducted until 11 September, when she sortied again for more exercises. She was assigned as part of Carrier Division 29, along with Lunga Point, Bismarck Sea, and Salamaua. The task group engaged in simulated amphibious landings on San Clemente Island. On 10 October, Rear Admiral Calvin T. Durgin took control over the escort carrier group, making Makin Island as his flagship. On 16 October, her task group finished exercises, and traveled to the Ulithi Atoll, making stops at Pearl Harbor and Enewetak Atoll.

On 10 November, the ship got underway for Leyte, stopping at Kossol Roads. There, she protected convoys in transit to supply the ongoing Battle of Leyte. Notably, on 21 November, she opened fire on three Nakajima J1N "Irving" twin-engined bombers who flew near the carrier, albeit the aircraft did not engage, and escaped. On 23 November, she was relieved by Carrier Division 27, and the task group sailed to Manus for the forthcoming invasion of Luzon. On 27 November, she arrived at Seeadler Harbor, Manus Island, where supplies were loaded and preparations were made. Between 16 December and 20 December, she left port to engage in exercises with Huon Gulf.

She left Manus island on 27 December, and she rendezvoused with the invasion force in Surigao Strait, Leyte on 3 January 1945. The fleet assembled for the invasion of Luzon was immense, consisting of 18 escort carriers, 6 battleships, 4 heavy cruisers, and a multitude of destroyers and destroyer escorts. Almost immediately, the massive fleet was continuously harassed by Japanese kamikaze attacks. On the night of 3 January, a Mitsubishi A6M Zero "Zeke" dove on the escort carriers, plunging into the ocean approximately 500 yd (460 m) from the starboard of Makin Island. On the afternoon of 4 January, the task force once again came under kamikaze attacks, which sunk Ommaney Bay. On the early morning of 5 January, a Japanese plane flew a scant 300 ft (91 m) over the carrier. Later that day, her aircraft supplemented a strike force which sunk Momi and heavily damaged Hinoki. That same day, in the evening, kamikazes damaged Louisville, Arunta, and Manila Bay. Makin Island arrived unscathed near Luzon on 6 January. For the next 11 days, she remained off of Luzon flying air support for the amphibious operation. Notably, Salamaua was heavily damaged by a kamikaze on 13 January. On 17 January, the escort carriers withdrew, heading back to Ulithi. During the three-week operation, the only fatality onboard Makin Island was a sailor on the flight deck, who died when a 3.5-inch rocket on an Avenger accidentally discharged, launching him off the carrier. A resulting search proved unsuccessful. This was despite the fact 16 of her own aircraft were destroyed through anti-aircraft fire and accidents. Her air group destroyed 10 Japanese aircraft, and her anti-aircraft guns claimed a kamikaze heading towards the task force.

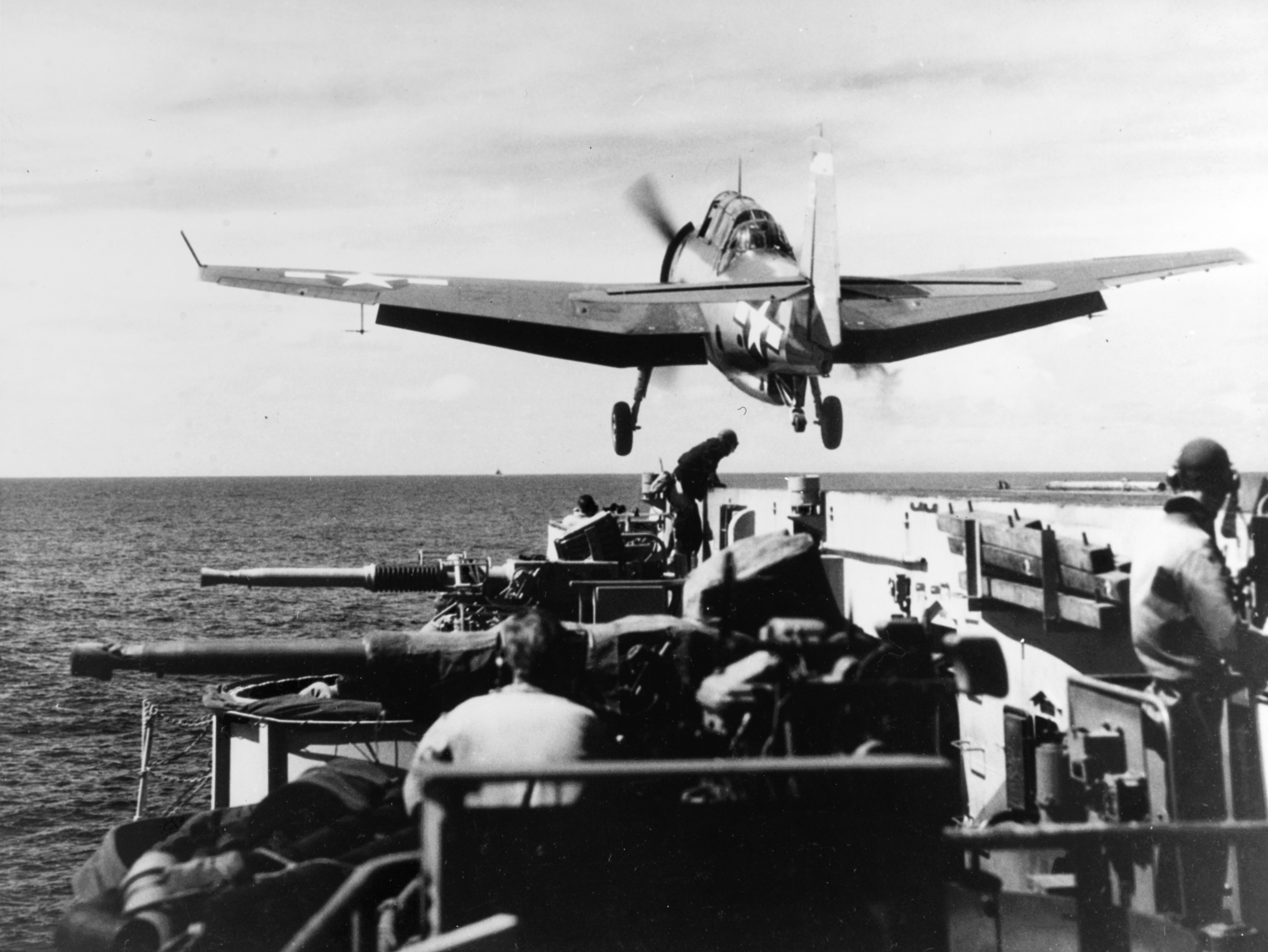
A TBM Avenger being launched off of Makin Bay's aircraft catapult.

After the Battle of Luzon, the aircraft carriers only had 18 days to prepare for the Invasion of Iwo Jima. On 10 February, she departed Ulithi for Iwo Jima, where she arrived on 16 February 1945. Her escort carrier task group conducted 3,000 sorties over the Iwo Islands until 8 March, conducting aerial reconnaissance, providing close air support, creating a fighter cover, and patrolling against submarines. On 28 February, her fighters were even used to spray down the island with DDT to control a boom in the population of flies on the island. Notably, her fighters intercepted two Japanese troop transports carrying reinforcements to Iwo Jima, which were promptly strafed and sunk. The carrier group yet again came under heavy Japanese kamikaze attacks, but Makin Island was once again unscathed, although Bismarck Sea was sunk, and Saratoga heavily damaged. Despite the intense air support, the only casualty onboard Makin Island was a wounded airman. After replenishing at Ulithi, she sailed for Okinawa, again as flagship. On 8 March, she retired to Ulithi in preparations for the Battle of Okinawa.

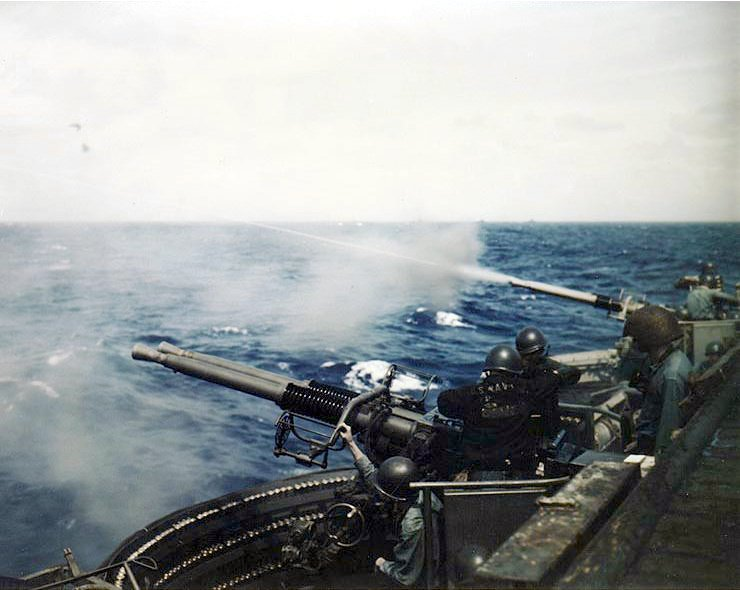
Gunnery practice on 21 March, shortly before Makin Island began operations in the Okinawa Campaign.

Arriving at Ulithi on 11 March, the ship was quickly readied, and launched for Okinawa on 21 March. Arriving on 25 March, Makin Island remained on station for 77 days (69 days directly off the coast of Okinawa), flying constant fire support, supply, and reconnaissance missions for the ground forces. The ship's aircraft, from Composite Squadrons 84 and 91 (VC-84 and -91), flew 2,347 combat sorties, recording almost 8,000 hours of flying time. Relieved 1 June, the carrier sailed for Guam, arriving on 5 June. Whilst in availability on Guam, Vice Admiral Ira Earl Hobbs relieved now Rear Admiral Whaley from command. In addition, her aircraft contingent was rotated, with VC-41 being transferred onto the ship.

She sailed again 11 July, with Task Group 32.1, into the East China Sea. The task group's goal was to provide air cover for minesweepers operating in the area, to blockade Japanese troops within China from mainland Japan, to provide air cover for a fast cruiser group which was raiding the Chinese coast, and to attack shipping around Shanghai. Upon a sweep of the Chinese coast, in which the task group encountered minimal resistance, and after a brief bombing of Shanghai harbor, she anchored in Buckner Bay, Okinawa, on 13 August. There, she received news of the Japanese surrender, and on 9 September proceeded to Wakanoura Wan, in southern Honshū, for occupation duty. Among her missions was providing air cover for the evacuation of Allied prisoners of war. She sailed for San Francisco on 18 October, arriving on 5 November, then voyaged to Shanghai to return troops (including the famous Flying Tigers) to the United States at Seattle on 30 December.

Makin Island was decommissioned on 19 April 1946 at Puget Sound, was stricken from the Navy list on 11 July, and sold on 1 January 1947.

== Sources ==
=== Online sources ===
- "Makin Island I (CVE-93)". Dictionary of American Naval Fighting Ships. Naval History and Heritage Command. 5 August 2015. Archived from the original on 1 June 2019.
- "Kaiser Vancouver, Vancouver WA". www.ShipbuildingHistory.com. 27 November 2010. Archived from the original on 16 June 2019.
- "World Aircraft Carriers List: US Escort Carriers, S4 Hulls". Hazegray.org. 14 December 1998. Archived from the original on 19 November 2021.

=== Bibliography ===
- Adcock, Al (1996), Escort Carriers in Action - Warships No. 9, Carrollton, Texas: Squadron/Signal Publications, ISBN 9780897473569
- Chesneau, Robert; Gardiner, Robert (1980), Conway's All the World's Fighting Ships 1922–1946, London, England: Naval Institute Press, ISBN 9780870219139
- Friedman, Norman (1983), U.S. Aircraft Carriers: An Illustrated Design History, Annapolis, Maryland: Naval Institute Press, ISBN 9780870217395
- Keith, Ralph (1991), THE WAR HISTORY OF USS MAKIN ISLAND CVE-93 (PDF) (PDF)
- Ross, Al (1993), The Escort Carrier Gambier Bay, Anatomy of the Ship, London, England: Conway Maritime Press, ISBN 9781557502353
- Y'Blood, William (2012), The Little Giants: U.S. Escort Carriers Against Japan, Annapolis, Maryland: Naval Institute Press, ISBN 9781612512471
