= George Henderson (British Army officer) =

Scottish lieutenant-colonel and royal engineer

- Born: 4 June 1783
- Died: 21 April 1855 (aged 71)
- Occupations: Lieutenant-colonel and royal engineer

George Henderson (4 June 1783 – 21 April 1855) was a Scottish lieutenant-colonel and royal engineer.

== Biography ==
Henderson was the son of Captain Henderson of the 4th royals. He was born on 4 June 1783 at Newton, his father's property, on the banks of the Dee, Aberdeenshire. He passed through the Royal Military Academy, Woolwich, and obtaining a commission in the corps of Royal Engineers joined at Portsmouth as second lieutenant in March 1800. He was promoted lieutenant the following year, and in 1803 was sent to Ceylon, where he served for nine years. He returned to England in August 1812 with the rank of captain, and in September was sent to Spain to join the Duke of Wellington's army operating in the Peninsula. He distinguished himself at the Siege of San Sebastián, for which he was mentioned in despatches and received the gold medal; he also took part in the battles of the Nive, Nivelle and Orthez, for which he received the war medal with two clasps. At the close of the war he was stationed in Ireland and, after his marriage, in Canada till 1819, when he returned to England. He attained the rank of lieutenant-colonel on 30 December 1824, and retired from the service on 9 April 1825. In 1830 he devoted himself to the formation of the London and South Western Railway Company, and was connected with that line, first as general superintendent, and subsequently as director, from its commencement until his death in Southampton on 21 April 1855. In May 1837 he was elected an associate of the Institution of Civil Engineers. For some years prior to his death he was chairman both of the London Equitable Gas Company and of the Southampton Gas Company.
