= USS Saginaw Bay =

Casablanca-class escort carrier of the U.S. Navy

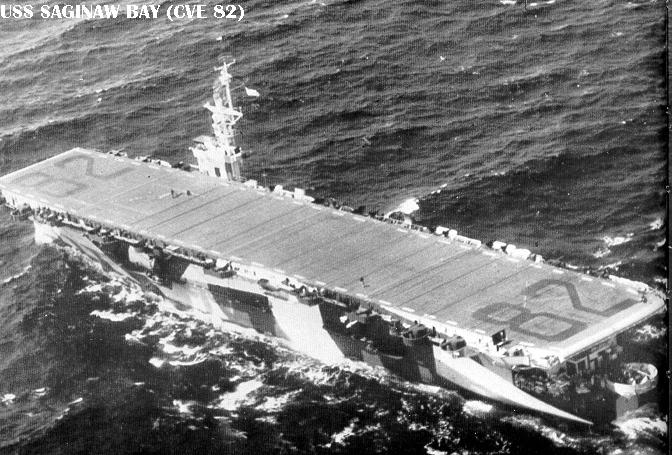
- USS Saginaw Bay underway, circa 1944

History

United States
- Name: Saginaw Bay
- Namesake: Saginaw Bay, Kuiu Island, Alaska
- Ordered: as a Type S4-S2-BB3 hull, MCE hull 1119
- Awarded: 18 June 1942
- Builder: Kaiser Shipyards
- Laid down: 1 November 1943
- Launched: 19 January 1944
- Commissioned: 2 March 1944
- Decommissioned: 19 June 1946
- Stricken: 1 March 1959
- Identification: Hull symbol: CVE-82
- Honors and awards: 5 Battle stars
- Fate: Sold for scrapping 27 November 1959

General characteristics
- Class & type: Casablanca-class escort carrier
- Displacement: 8,188 long tons (8,319 t) (standard); 10,902 long tons (11,077 t) (full load)
- Length: 512 ft 3 in (156.13 m) (oa); 490 ft (150 m) (wl); 474 ft (144 m) (fd)
- Beam: 65 ft 2 in (19.86 m); 108 ft (33 m) (extreme width)
- Draft: 20 ft 9 in (6.32 m) (max)
- Installed power: 4 × Babcock & Wilcox boilers; 9,000 shp (6,700 kW)
- Propulsion: 2 × Skinner Unaflow reciprocating steam engines; 2 × screws
- Speed: 19 knots (35 km/h; 22 mph)
- Range: 10,240 nmi (18,960 km; 11,780 mi) at 15 kn (28 km/h; 17 mph)
- Complement: Total: 910 – 916 officers and men; Embarked Squadron: 50 – 56; Ship's Crew: 860
- Armament: As designed: 1 × 5 in (127 mm)/38 cal dual-purpose gun; 4 × twin 40 mm (1.57 in) Bofors anti-aircraft guns; 12 × 20 mm (0.79 in) Oerlikon anti-aircraft cannons; Varied, ultimate armament: 1 × 5 in (127 mm)/38 cal dual-purpose gun; 8 × twin 40 mm (1.57 in) Bofors anti-aircraft guns; 20 × 20 mm (0.79 in) Oerlikon anti-aircraft cannons
- Aircraft carried: 27
- Aviation facilities: 1 × catapult; 2 × elevators

Service record
- Part of: United States Pacific Fleet (1943–1946); Atlantic Reserve Fleet (1946–1959)
- Operations: Mariana and Palau Islands campaign; Philippines campaign; Invasion of Iwo Jima; Battle of Okinawa; Operation Magic Carpet

USS Saginaw Bay (CVE-82) was a Casablanca-class escort carrier of the United States Navy. It was named after Saginaw Bay, located within Kuiu Island. The bay was in turn named after USS Saginaw, a U.S. Navy sloop-of-war that spent 1868 and 1869 charting and exploring the Alaskan coast. Launched in January 1944, and commissioned in March, she served in support of the Mariana and Palau Islands campaign, the Philippines campaign, the Invasion of Iwo Jima, and the Battle of Okinawa. Postwar, she participated in Operation Magic Carpet. She was decommissioned in April 1946, when she was mothballed in the Atlantic Reserve Fleet. Ultimately, she was sold for scrapping in November 1959.

== Design and description ==
A side profile of the design of Thetis Bay.

Saginaw Bay was a Casablanca-class escort carrier, the most numerous type of aircraft carriers ever built. Built to stem heavy losses during the Battle of the Atlantic, they came into service in late 1943, by which time the U-boat threat was already in retreat. Although some did see service in the Atlantic, the majority were utilized in the Pacific, ferrying aircraft, providing logistics support, and conducting close air support for the island-hopping campaigns. The Casablanca-class carriers were built on the standardized Type S4-S2-BB3 hull, a lengthened variant of the Doyen-class hull, and specifically designed to be mass-produced using welded prefabricated sections. This allowed them to be produced at unprecedented speeds: the final ship of her class, Munda, was delivered to the Navy just 101 days after the laying of her keel.

Saginaw Bay was 512 ft 3 in (156.13 m) long overall (490 ft (150 m) at the waterline), had a beam of 65 ft 2 in (19.86 m), and a draft of 20 ft 9 in (6.32 m). She displaced 8,188 long tons (8,319 t) standard, which increased to 10,902 long tons (11,077 t) with a full load. To carry out flight operations, the ship had a 257 ft (78 m) hangar deck and a 474 ft (144 m) flight deck. Her compact size necessitated the installation of an aircraft catapult at her bow, and there were two aircraft elevators to facilitate movement of aircraft between the flight and hangar deck: one each fore and aft.

She was powered by four Babcock & Wilcox Express D boilers that raised 285 psi (1,970 kPa) of steam at 577 °F (303 °C). The steam generated by these boilers fed two Skinner Unaflow reciprocating steam engines, delivering 9,000 hp (6,700 kW) to two propeller shafts. This allowed her to reach speeds of 19 kn (35 km/h; 22 mph), with a cruising range of 10,240 nmi (18,960 km; 11,780 mi) at 15 kn (28 km/h; 17 mph). For armament, one 5 in (127 mm)/38 caliber dual-purpose gun was mounted on the stern. Additional anti-aircraft defense was provided by eight Bofors 40 mm (1.57 in) anti-aircraft guns in single mounts and twelve Oerlikon 20 mm (0.79 in) cannons mounted around the perimeter of the deck. By 1945, Casablanca-class carriers had been modified to carry twenty Oerlikon cannons and sixteen Bofors guns; the doubling of the latter was accomplished by putting them into twin mounts. Sensors onboard consisted of a SG surface-search radar and a SK air-search radar.

Although Casablanca-class escort carriers were intended to function with a crew of 860 and an embarked squadron of 50 to 56, the exigencies of wartime often necessitated the inflation of the crew count. They were designed to operate with 27 aircraft, but the hangar deck could accommodate much more during transport or training missions.

During the Mariana and Palau Islands campaign, she carried 18 FM-2 fighters, and 12 TBM-1C torpedo bombers, for a total of 30 aircraft. However, during the Philippines campaign, she carried 20 FM-2 fighters and 12 TBM-3 torpedo bombers, for a total of 32 aircraft. During the Invasion of Iwo Jima, she carried 20 FM-2 fighters and 12 TBM-3 torpedo bombers, for a total of 32 aircraft. During the Battle of Okinawa, she carried 19 FM-2 fighters, 11 TBM-3 torpedo bombers, and a TBM-3P reconnaissance aircraft, for a total of 31 aircraft.

== Construction ==
A contract for fifty Casablanca-class escort carriers was made on 18 June 1942, with the construction being awarded to the Kaiser Shipbuilding Company, Vancouver, Washington. All fifty were commissioned in the span of a single year. Saginaw Bay was laid down on 1 November 1943 under a Maritime Commission contract, MC hull 1119, by Kaiser Shipbuilding Company, Vancouver, Washington. She was launched on 19 January 1944, and was sponsored by Mrs. Howard L. Vickery. After construction was completed, the ship was transferred to the United States Navy and commissioned on 2 March. Upon commissioning, Saginaw Bay was under the command of Captain Frank Carlin Sutton Jr.

== Service history ==
=== World War II ===
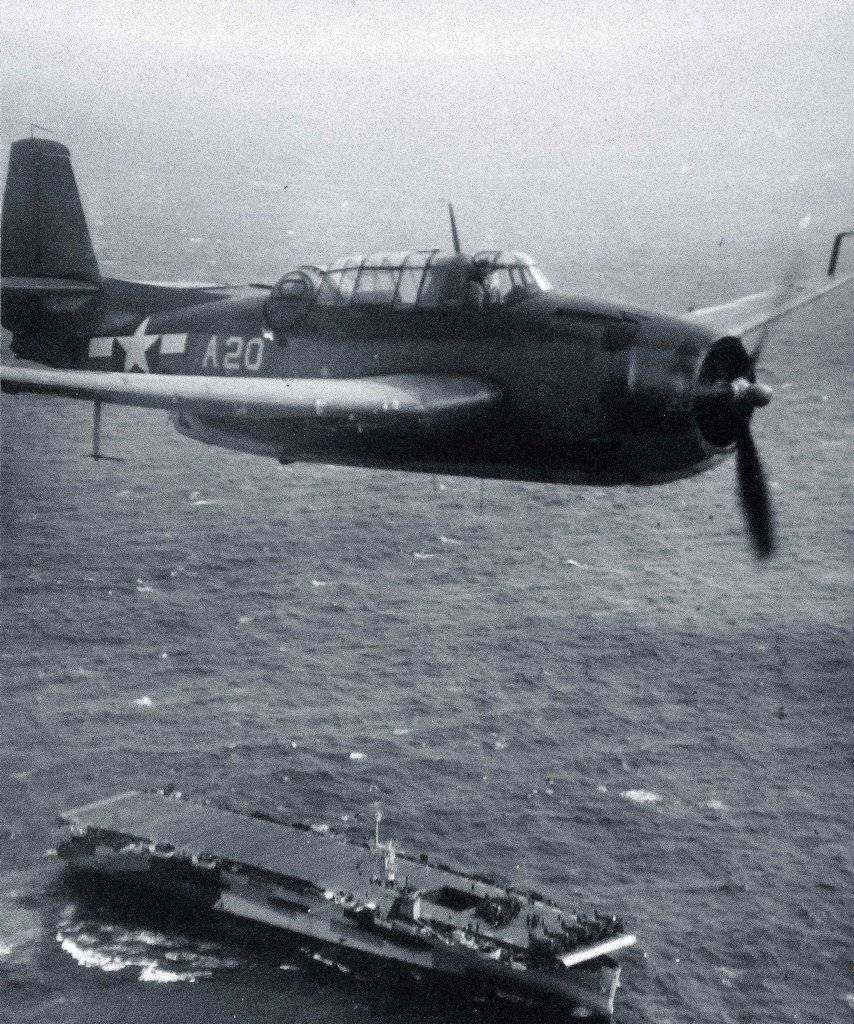
A TBM Avenger flies over Saginaw Bay on 14 June 1944, during pilot qualifications off of Southern California.

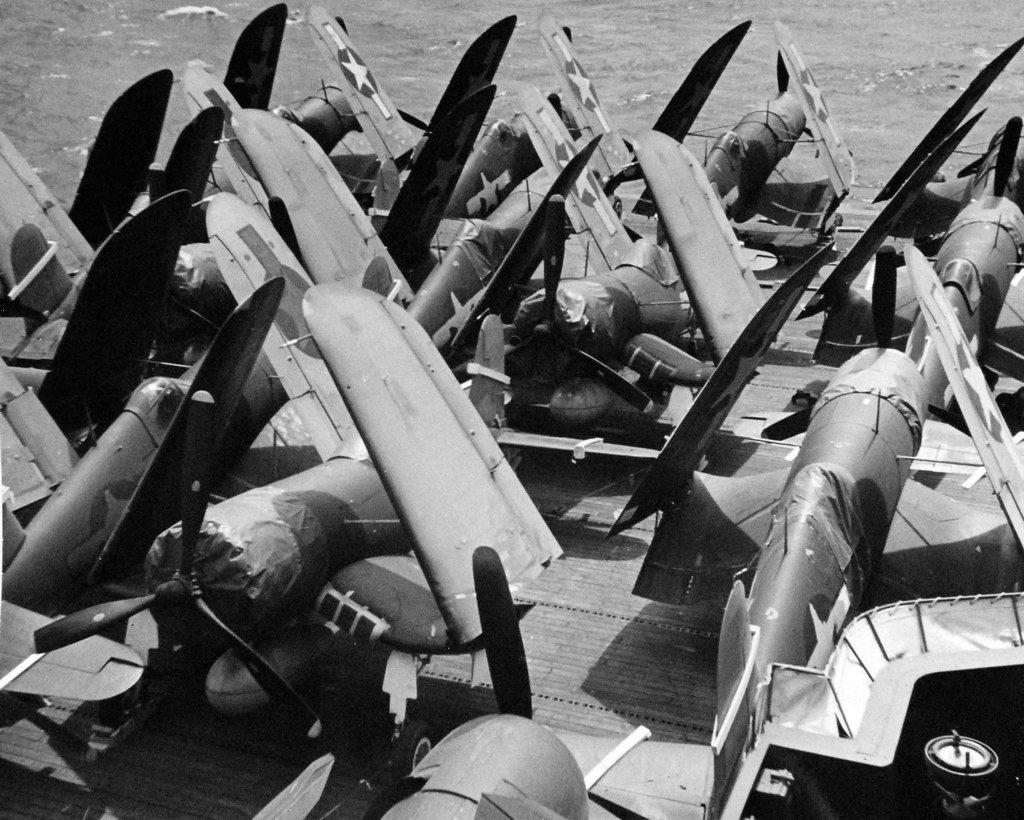
Vought F4U Corsairs being ferried to Hawaii onboard Saginaw Bay, 19 April 1944.

Upon being commissioned, she underwent a shakedown cruise off of San Diego. On 15 April 1944, Saginaw Bay loaded aircraft and their pilots from Terminal Island for transport to Hawaii. She arrived at Pearl Harbor on 21 April, where she unloaded her cargo in exchange for damaged planes, before returning to Alameda, California. She proceeded to conduct pilot qualifications off the coast of San Diego throughout May and early June, during which an FM-2 fighter crashed into the sea, killing its pilot. After completing her exercises, she underwent a second replenishment aircraft ferry mission, arriving at Pearl Harbor on 5 July.

After taking on a load of aircraft, she proceeded westward to Enewetak Atoll and Majuro before returning to San Diego. On 13 August, she left, bound for the Solomon Islands, where she would act as the flagship for Carrier Division 28, commanded by Rear Admiral George R. Henderson. There, she prepared for the invasion of the Palaus. From 15 September to 9 October, her task group provided air cover over Peleliu and Angaur.

She retired to Seeadler Harbor, located within Manus Island, where plans were drawn for the landings on Leyte. She joined "Taffy 1", along with 12 other escort carriers, under the command of Rear Admiral Thomas L. Sprague. "Taffy 1" was assigned the task of guarding the southeast entrance into Leyte Gulf. On 14 October, the task group departed, guarding troop transports along the way, arriving within Leyte Gulf by 20 October. As the Japanese Fleet closed in for a decisive engagement on 24 October, Saginaw Bay and Chenango transferred much of their aircraft contingent to other carriers. She then retired to Morotai for replacement aircraft, missing the ensuing Battle off Samar. She rejoined her task unit on 28 October with a new aircraft contingent, just as it started to retire back to Manus.

Saginaw Bay was anchored in Seeadler Harbor on 10 November when the ammunition ship Mount Hood underwent a catastrophic explosion. She suffered only minor damage from the blast and resulting tidal wave. During her layover, she was taken into dry dock for repairs. From 14 December to the 21st, she underwent exercises in preparation for amphibious landings at Lingayen. On 2 January 1945, her task group departed Manus, escorting transports, arriving at Lingayen Gulf just in time to support the landings on 9 January. On 10 January, she came under attack from two Japanese bombers, who dropped bombs, which missed. On 14 January, a torpedo was spotted near her hull, which also missed. During this period of activity, Kitkun Bay was heavily damaged by a kamikaze, and Ommaney Bay was sunk by one, complicating the task group's efforts to provide air support. Efforts were also hampered by heavy seas, which made landings on her flight deck precarious. On 21 January, she retired from supporting the landings, steaming back to Ulithi, in preparation for the landings upon Iwo Jima.

On 23 January, she participated in a rehearsal of the Iwo Jima landings in Ulithi. On 10 February, her task group departed Ulithi en route to Iwo Jima, making a stop at Saipan along the way. On 19 February, she supported the landings and provided air support until 11 March. During operations, the carrier task group was constantly harried by kamikazes. Her crew witnessed the escort carrier Bismarck Sea get hit by two kamikazes, before sinking from the resulting blaze. On 11 March, she departed from Iwo Jima bound for Ulithi, with Japanese forces still entrenched within the northern half of the island.

On 14 March, she arrived back at Ulithi, where Captain Robert Goldthwaite assumed command. Saginaw Bay was quickly returned into action, departing for Okinawa on 21 March, arriving on 24 March. There, she immediately began operations in preparation for the landings, which proceeded until 29 April. On 2 April, her anti-aircraft guns shot down a Japanese plane which dove towards her, while she was loading ammunition within Kerama Retto Harbor. Throughout the battle, her aircraft claimed eleven Japanese planes. On 29 April, she was ordered back to the United States, making stops at Guam, Pearl Harbor, arriving at San Francisco on 22 May, where she underwent repairs. After repairs were finished, she then proceeded down to San Diego, where she delivered planes to Guam, returning on 20 August. En route, the surrender of Japan was announced.

=== Post war ===
Following the end of the war, she steamed for Hawaii, where she underwent training operations before being incorporated into Operation Magic Carpet, which repatriated U.S. servicemen from throughout the Pacific. On 14 September, she departed Hawaii, making stops at Guiuan Roadstead, Samar, and San Pedro Bay, Leyte, where she took on servicemen. She then returned to San Francisco. She then made a second Magic Carpet run to Buckner Bay, Okinawa, before proceeding back for San Francisco.

On 1 February 1946, she was discharged from the Magic Carpet fleet, and departed San Francisco for Boston Naval Shipyard, on the Eastern seaboard. She arrived on 23 February for inactivation, and she was subsequently decommissioned on 19 June. She was assigned to the Boston Group of the U.S. Atlantic Reserve Fleet. On 12 June 1955, she was reclassified as CVHE-82, but she was never converted. On 1 March 1959, she was struck from the navy list and sold to Louis Simmons on 27 November. In April 1960, she was broken up in Rotterdam, the Netherlands.

== Sources ==
=== Online sources ===
- "Saginaw Bay (CVE-82)". Dictionary of American Naval Fighting Ships. Naval History and Heritage Command. 27 April 2016. Archived from the original on 2 June 2019.
- "Kaiser Vancouver, Vancouver WA". www.ShipbuildingHistory.com. 27 November 2010. Archived from the original on 16 June 2019.
- "World Aircraft Carriers List: US Escort Carriers, S4 Hulls". Hazegray.org. 14 December 1998. Archived from the original on 19 November 2021.
- McCarty, Dennis B. "USS Saginaw Bay CVE 82 – Ships Movement History" (PDF). NavSource.

=== Bibliography ===
- Adcock, Al (1996), Escort Carriers in Action - Warships No. 9, Carrollton, Texas: Squadron/Signal Publications, ISBN 9780897473569
- Chesneau, Robert; Gardiner, Robert (1980), Conway's All the World's Fighting Ships 1922–1946, London, England: Naval Institute Press, ISBN 9780870219139
- Friedman, Norman (1983), U.S. Aircraft Carriers: An Illustrated Design History, Annapolis, Maryland: Naval Institute Press, ISBN 9780870217395
- Ross, Al (1993), The Escort Carrier Gambier Bay, Anatomy of the Ship, London, England: Conway Maritime Press, ISBN 9781557502353
- Y'Blood, William (2012), The Little Giants: U.S. Escort Carriers Against Japan, Annapolis, Maryland: Naval Institute Press, ISBN 9781612512471
