= Krazy George =

American cheerleader (born 1944)

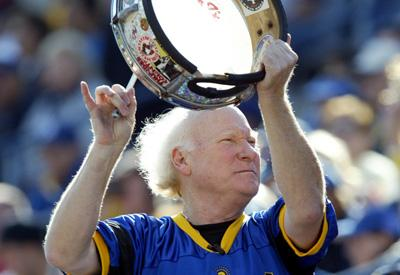
- Henderson in 2007 at Spartan Stadium
- Born: George Henderson; May 6, 1944 (age 82)
- Education: San Jose State University
- Occupation: Professional cheerleader
- Years active: 1968–present
- Known for: Inventor of "The Wave"

George Henderson (born May 6, 1944), known as Krazy George, is an American professional cheerleader who has been credited by some sources as inventor of the wave.

== Career ==
George began cheerleading in 1968 while attending San José State University, where he was a member of the judo team. He continued after graduation, and became known for leading sectional cheers at local sporting events accompanied by his hand drum. In the early 1970s, while working as a high school teacher at Buchser High School in Santa Clara, California, Henderson was hired by the California Golden Seals of the National Hockey League to be a cheerleader. At one game in 1974 between the Seals and Boston Bruins, his antics attracted the attention of a PR executive from a new soccer franchise in San Jose who was attending the Seals game.

The San Jose Earthquakes invited him to join the soccer club for its inaugural season for $35 per game. Fans, averaging over 15,000 per game, reacted so boisterously to his cheerleading that a formal protest was filed by one opponent after a loss, claiming that the crowd noise 'interfered with (the) team's preparations for overtime.' Eventually the Quakes' Communications Director Tom Mertens and Krazy George came to an understanding to slightly tone down his antics, but crowds still reacted wildly to cheers until he left the Quakes in 1978. The Quakes had essentially launched his full-time career. In 1975 he was hired to be a cheerleader for one game by the NFL Kansas City Chiefs team owner Lamar Hunt. Hunt had witnessed George during an Earthquakes soccer game against the Dallas Tornado, which Hunt also owned. Hunt then extended his contract for the remainder of the season, and each year through 1979 (when the Chiefs lost a bidding war to the Houston Oilers).

George, characterized by his drum and gravelly voice, in 1980 gained widespread attention, including that of NFL Commissioner Pete Rozelle. After the Pittsburgh Steelers Coach Chuck Noll complained about the crowd noise generated in a game against Houston, the Minnesota Vikings contacted the Houston Oilers to "make sure I was controlled and would not do anything to hinder their plays." After losing the game, the Vikings lodged an objection claiming the cheering inspired by George disrupted the signal calling of the Minnesota quarterback. The Viking's general manager, Mike Lynn, later said that Vikings quarterback Tommy Kramer could not be heard above the crowd noise as the Vikings lost 21–16. Lynn eventually hired Henderson in 1982 to work for the Vikings.

In 1989 the NFL adopted a rule specifically targeting "noise making specialists hired exclusively for that purpose" of disrupting play calling, a rule that Henderson says was aimed at him.

George led cheers for the US men's national soccer team at the 1994 FIFA World Cup at Stanford Stadium and the Rose Bowl stadium in Pasadena, California. He has worked for numerous minor league sports teams. He continues to cheer at San Jose Earthquakes games, and says he plans to continue until he is "at least 99". With co-author Patricia Timberg, George wrote the book "Krazy George: Still Krazy After All These Cheers" in 2014.

== The wave ==
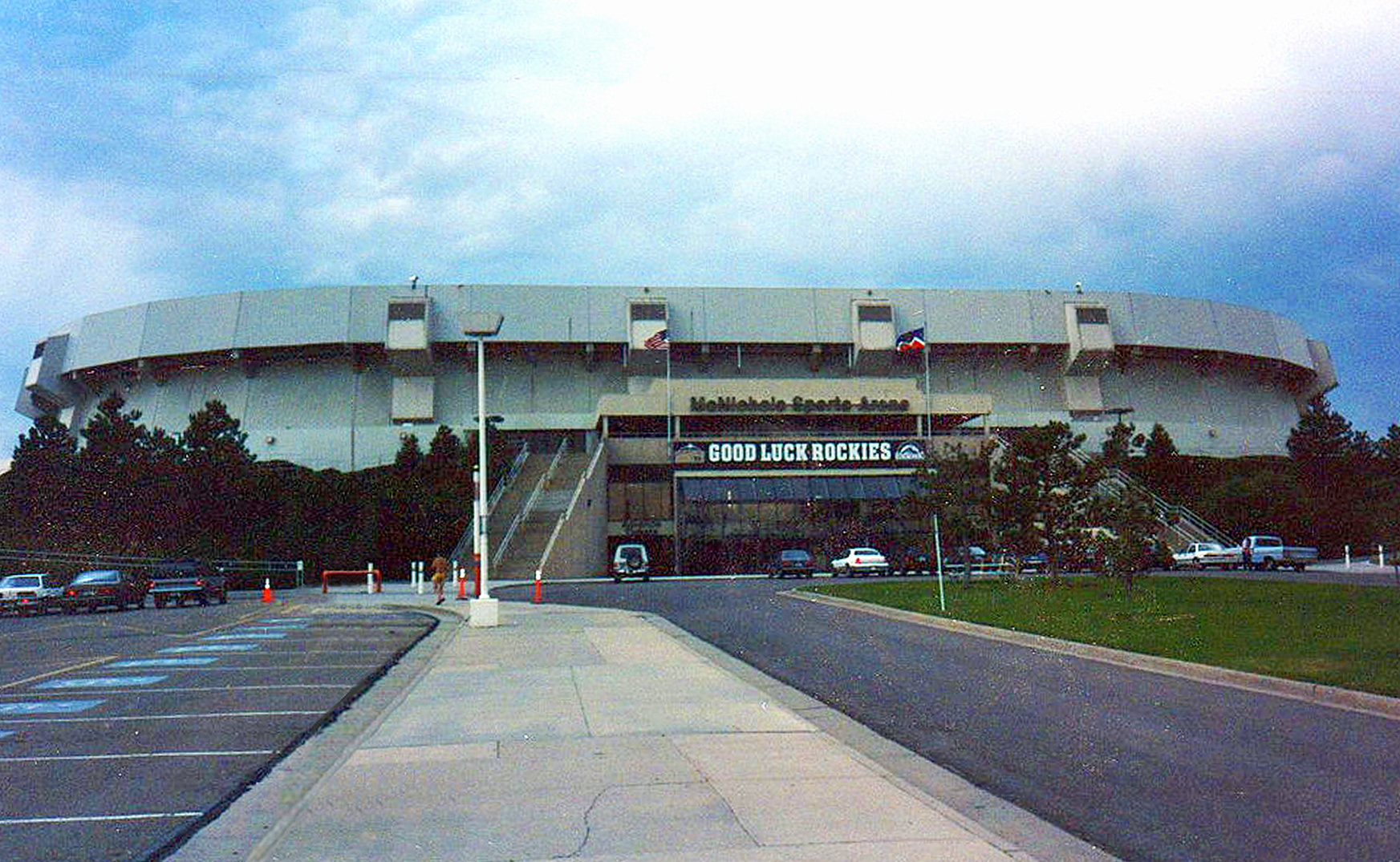
Henderson first performed "wave" at McNichols Sports Arena (1979)

Krazy George has been credited by some sources as the inventor of the stadium wave. He claims the wave first occurred on October 15, 1981, during a playoff game between the New York Yankees and the Oakland Athletics. After a few false starts, the crowd understood what George was trying to accomplish, and the wave fully circled the Oakland Coliseum. George notes that the stadium was full and the crowd was energetic, the ideal situation for a wave.

George said that he had previously attempted to lead the wave after seeing a section of fans cheer in a delayed manner and unintentionally trigger a wave-like crowd movement, and notes an earlier instance at Colorado Rockies fans at McNichols Sports Arena. He worked on leading the wave at an Edmonton Oilers NHL game at Northlands Coliseum in Edmonton, Alberta, Canada, where he says that star Wayne Gretzky met George in the post-game locker room and invited him to dinner.

== Employers ==
Krazy George leads a cheer at a San Jose State women's volleyball game.

During his career, Henderson has worked for a number of teams in many different sports, including:

- Ball State Cardinals (NCAA)
- British Columbia Lions (CFL)
- California Golden Seals (NHL)
- Colorado Avalanche (NHL)
- Colorado Rockies (MLB)
- Colorado Rockies (NHL)
- Dallas Tornado (NASL)
- Edmonton Drillers (NASL)
- Edmonton Oilers (NHL)
- Guelph Storm (OHL)
- Houston Hotshots (CISL & WISL)
- Houston Oilers (NFL)
- Houston Stallions (Southern Indoor Football League)
- Kansas City Chiefs (NFL)
- Minnesota Vikings (NFL)
- New Orleans Saints (NFL)
- Oakland Athletics (MLB)
- Oklahoma State Cowboys (NCAA)
- Pittsburgh Spirit (MISL)
- Salt Lake Sting (APSL)
- San Antonio Texans (CFL)
- San Jose Earthquakes (MLS and NASL)
- San Jose Giants (California League)
- San Jose State Spartans (NCAA)
- Tampa Bay Rowdies (NASL)
- Tennessee Titans (NFL)
- Tulsa Roughnecks (NASL)
- The United States men's and women's national soccer teams at the FIFA World Cup and the Olympics
- Vancouver Giants (WHL)
- Vancouver Whitecaps (NASL)
- Wheeling Nailers (ECHL)
- Wichita Wings (MISL)
- Winnipeg Jets (NHL)

== In media ==
George appeared in an episode of the Match Game-Hollywood Squares Hour, hired by panelist Robert Donner to improve his rapport with the audience. He was also a contestant in an episode of To Tell the Truth.

He played a small role in the 1976 cult film The Milpitas Monster.

He was featured in a tenth-season episode of America's Got Talent, during which his entire act consisted solely of leading the audience in "the wave". He was buzzed out by the judges in seconds.

== Personal life ==
George and his wife Pat live in Capitola in Central Coast of California.
