= USS Oliver Mitchell =

American ship

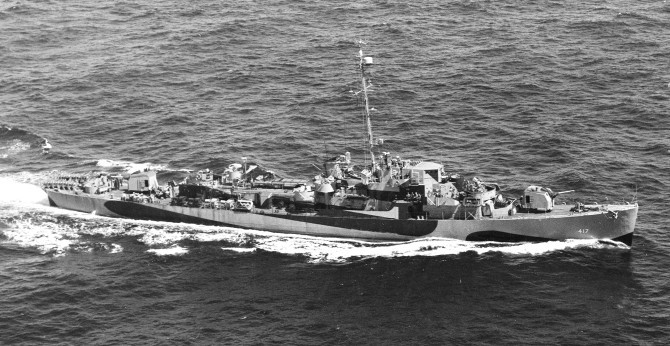
- Oliver Mitchell east of Nantucket Sound, 20 August 1944

History

United States
- Name: Oliver Mitchell
- Builder: Brown Shipbuilding Company, Houston, Texas
- Laid down: 3 January 1944
- Launched: 8 February 1944
- Commissioned: 14 June 1944
- Decommissioned: 24 April 1946
- Stricken: 15 March 1972
- Fate: Sold for scrap, 15 January 1973

General characteristics
- Class & type: John C. Butler-class destroyer escort
- Displacement: 1,350 long tons (1,372 t) (standard); 1,745 long tons (1,773 t) (full load)
- Length: 306 ft (93.3 m) (o/a)
- Beam: 36 ft 10 in (11.2 m)
- Draft: 13 ft 4 in (4.1 m)
- Installed power: 2 boilers; 12,000 shp (8,900 kW)
- Propulsion: 2 propellers; 2 geared steam turbines
- Speed: 24 knots (44 km/h; 28 mph)
- Range: 6,000 nmi (11,000 km; 6,900 mi) at 12 knots (22 km/h; 14 mph)
- Complement: 14 officers and 201 enlisted men
- Sensors & processing systems: SL series surface search radar; SA series air search radar; QC series sonar
- Armament: 2 × single 5 in (127 mm) guns; 2 × twin 40 mm (1.6 in) AA guns; 10 × single 20 mm (0.79 in) AA guns; 1 × triple 21 in (533 mm) torpedo tubes; 8 × depth charge throwers; 1 × Hedgehog ASW mortar; 2 × depth charge racks

For other ships with a similar name see USS Mitchell.

USS Oliver Mitchell (DE-417) was a John C. Butler-class destroyer escort built for the United States Navy during World War II. Post-war, after active participation in the Pacific War, her crew returned home with five battle stars to their credit.

== Namesake ==
Oliver Mitchell was born on 14 March 1917 in Los Angeles, California. He was the son of Nicholas D. Mitchell and Margaret Ruth Green of Los Angeles. He enlisted in the Marine Corps Reserve on 23 May 1941 and was appointed Aviation Cadet in the U.S. Naval Reserve on 3 September 1941. He was commissioned a 2nd Lieutenant in the Marine Reserves on 14 March 1942, was assigned to combat duty in the Solomon Islands in July. On 23 August 1942 he was killed in action while engaging Japanese destroyers off Ramos Island. He was posthumously awarded the Silver Star.

== Design ==
The John C. Butler-class destroyer escorts were designed to meet a need for large numbers of cheap anti-submarine escort ships for ocean convoys, and as a result carried little anti-surface armament. The class was part of an initial requirement for 720 escorts to be completed by the end of 1944, which was significantly reduced.

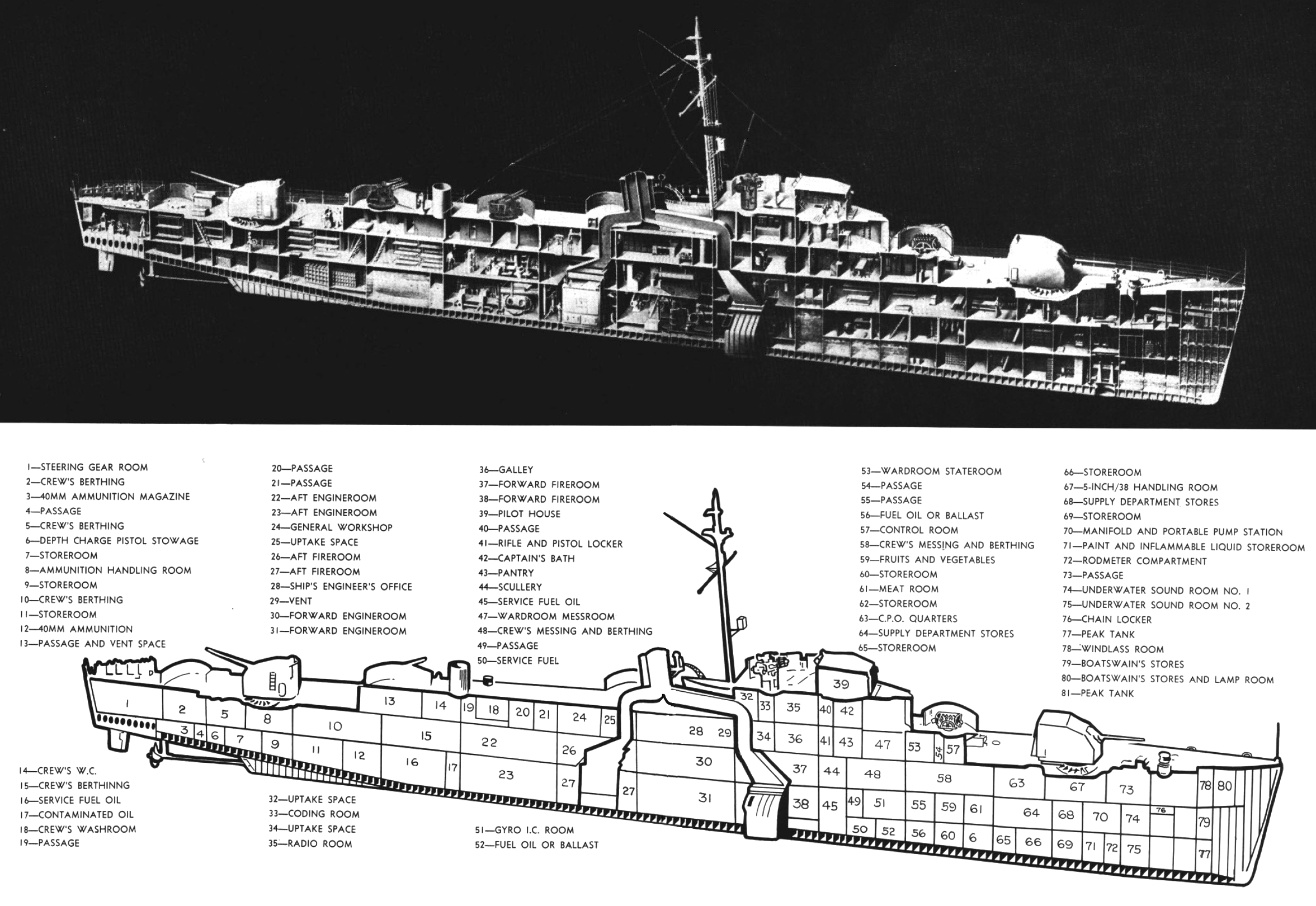
A United States Navy diagram of a destroyer escort

Oliver Mitchell was 306 feet (93.3 m) long overall with a beam of 36 feet 10 inches (11.2 m) and a draft of 13 feet 4 inches (4.1 m). She displaced 1,350 long tons (1,372 t) standard and 1,745 long tons (1,773 t) full load, with a complement of 14 officers and 201 enlisted men.

The ship was propelled by two Westinghouse geared steam turbines powered by two "D" Express boilers, which created 12,000 shaft horsepower (8,900 kW) for a designed maximum speed of 24 knots (44 km/h; 28 mph). She had a range of 6,000 nautical miles (11,000 km; 6,900 mi) at 12 knots (22 km/h; 14 mph).

=== Armament and sensors ===
Oliver Mitchell mounted a main battery of two single turret-mounted 5"/38 caliber guns, one forward and one aft of the superstructure, to protect against surface and aerial threats, directed by the Mark 51 Gunnery Fire-Control System. In addition, she mounted two twin 40 mm Bofors anti-aircraft (AA) guns, superfiring over the 5-inch guns, and ten 20 mm Oerlikon AA cannon, also controlled by the Mark 51 fire-control system. Equipped with three 21-inch (533 mm) torpedo tubes, the ship also carried two depth charge racks, eight K-gun depth-charge throwers and one Hedgehog spigot mortar as anti-submarine weapons. She was equipped with QC series sonar, SL series surface search radar, and SA series air search radar.

== Construction and service ==
=== Construction, shakedown, and initial Pacific operations ===
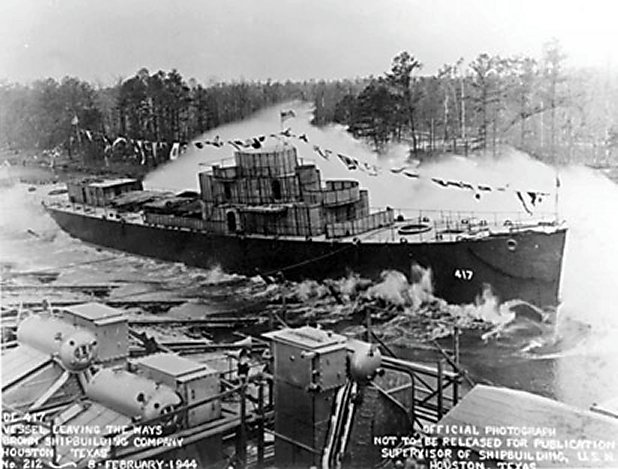
Oliver Mitchell being side launched on 8 February 1944

Laid down by the Brown Shipbuilding Company of Houston, Texas, on 3 January 1944, Oliver Mitchell (DE-417) was launched on 8 February of that year, sponsored by the mother of her namesake, 2nd Lieutenant Oliver Mitchell, a Marine pilot who posthumously received the Silver Star for his attack on a Japanese destroyer during the Guadalcanal campaign. She was commissioned on 14 June 1944. Following commissioning, the ship completed her fitting out, received ammunition, and moved down the Houston Ship Channel to Galveston for gunnery testing during the second half of the month. She sailed for Bermuda on 2 July and undertook a shakedown cruise off the island for most of the month and the first days of August, attached to the Atlantic Fleet. While mooring alongside Oliver Mitchell on 5 August, her sister ship Gentry collided with her, causing minor damage.

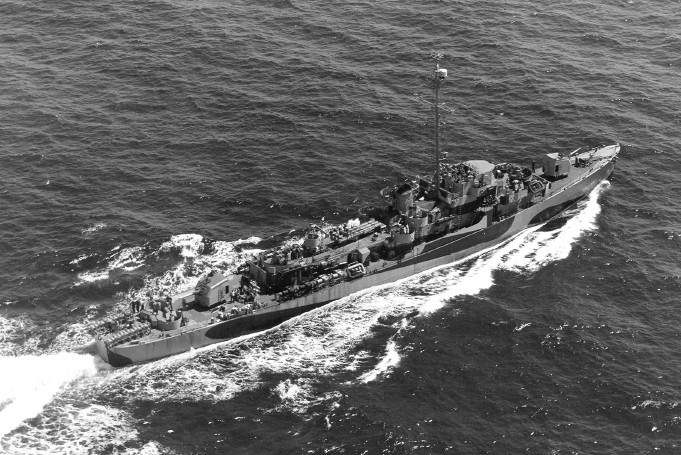
Oliver Mitchell underway east of Nantucket Sound on 20 August 1944, from a blimp of ZP-11

For repairs to correct deficiencies found during shakedown, Oliver Mitchell was ordered to the Boston Navy Yard, and thence to Norfolk Navy Yard for further work. Together with her sister Robert F. Keller, she departed Norfolk on 27 August for the Philadelphia Navy Yard, where she met the seaplane tender Currituck. The three ships departed for the Panama Canal on the last day of August. Assigned to Escort Division (CortDiv) 72 of the Pacific Fleet after transiting the canal on 6 September, the two destroyer escorts arrived at San Diego on 15 September. Oliver Mitchell steamed to Pearl Harbor and entered it on 25 September. Operating from Pearl Harbor, she screened Saratoga while the latter conducted carrier qualification between 1 and 5 October. Oliver Mitchell participated in hunter-killer group exercises with the escort carrier Anzio and fellow CortDiv 72 destroyer escorts Robert F. Keller, Lawrence C. Taylor, Melvin R. Nawman, and Tabberer between 8 and 12 October. She departed for Eniwetok with Anzio and the four CortDiv 72 escorts on 16 October, arriving there on 24 October. Anzio departed for Ulithi with the destroyer escorts on 28 October. Oliver Mitchell rescued two survivors from the crew of a crashed TBF Avenger from the escort carrier later that day, and on 29 October picked up four men thrown overboard when a crashed plane sent two others off the Anzio flight deck. The ships arrived at Ulithi on 1 November.

=== Hunter-killer operations ===
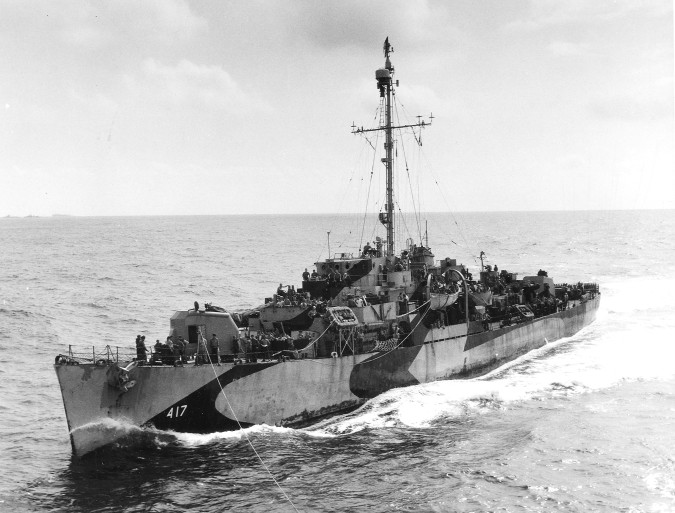
Oliver Mitchell approaching Anzio to return a rescued Avenger crew, 19 December 1944

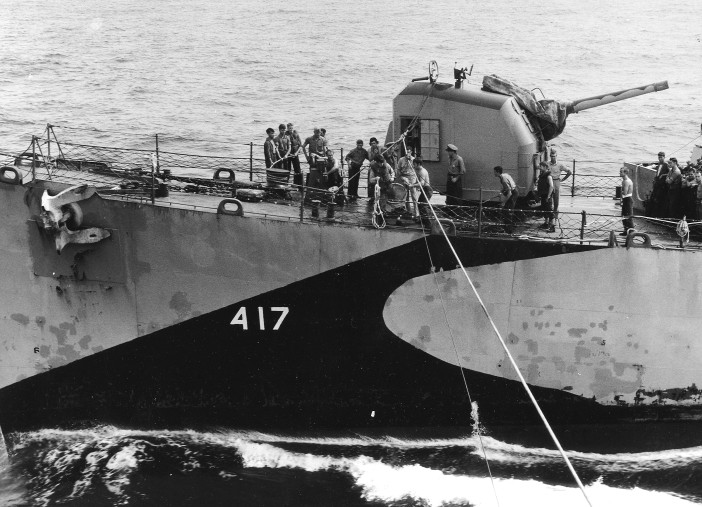
Sailors on the port bow about to make the transfer by breeches buoy

After arrival at Ulithi, Anzio and her escorts were designated as Task Group (TG) 30.7 of the Third Fleet, and on 4 November departed to serve as a hunter-killer group in the Philippine Sea. They were diverted later that day to assist the light cruiser Reno, torpedoed by a Japanese submarine. The task group protected the light cruiser while she was towed back to Ulithi until 8 November, when it was tasked with screening the oilers of TG 30.8. Lawrence C. Taylor and Melvin R. Nawman sank a Japanese submarine on 18 November, and the task group returned to Ulithi ten days later. The commander of CortDiv72 transferred his pennant to Oliver Mitchell on 3 December, before TG 30.7 departed Ulithi on 10 December for an anti-submarine sweep around TG 30.8. Three days later, TG 30.7 left TG 30.8 for an anti-submarine sweep north of the Fast Carrier Task Force (TF 38) as the aircraft of the latter supported the Mindoro landings with strikes against Japanese airfields on Luzon. Oliver Mitchell depth charged a false contact on 14 December and rescued the crew of a crashed Anzio Avenger on 17 December. When TG 30.7 and the rest of the Third Fleet ran into Typhoon Cobra on 18 December, she became separated from Anzio for several hours while weathering the storm. On 21 December, Anzio, Oliver Mitchell, Robert F. Keller, and Lawrence C. Taylor were sent to search for survivors of destroyers sunk in the typhoon, but Oliver Mitchell only recovered three corpses. TG 30.7 returned to Ulithi on Christmas morning, and departed on 29 December for an anti-submarine sweep ahead of TG 30.8, with the destroyer Kalk replacing Tabberer and Melvin R. Nawman, damaged in the typhoon.

Oliver Mitchell and Lawrence C. Taylor were detached to TG 38.2 of the Fast Carrier Task Force between 2 and 6 January 1945 to screen the fleet carriers as they launched strikes on Formosa and Luzon in support of the invasion of Lingayen Gulf. While returning to TG 30.7, a broken shaft disabled her sonar, preventing effective anti-submarine operations and relegating her to providing plane guard duty for Anzio. As a result, the commander of CortDiv 72 transferred his pennant to Lawrence C. Taylor on 10 January. On the next day, Oliver Mitchell was detached from TG 30.7 to return to Ulithi in company with two destroyers and an oiler, arriving two days later. At Ulithi, the ship was drydocked for sonar repairs and remained there for the rest of the month. The commander of CortDiv 72 returned his pennant to her when TG 30.7 returned to Ulithi on 28 January.

=== Iwo Jima and Okinawa ===
Departing Ulithi for Eniwetok on 2 February with Anzio and Robert F. Keller, forming TG 50.7 of the Fifth Fleet (renamed when Admiral Raymond Spruance took command of the fleet), Oliver Mitchell and her task group arrived there four days later. At Eniwetok, Tabberer and Melvin R. Nawman rejoined the task group, which departed Eniwetok for Saipan on 7 February, covering the transports of TG 51.11 and 51.12. Off Saipan, they met the fleet for the invasion of Iwo Jima, with the task group joining Task Unit (TU) 52.2.2 of the Support Carrier Group (Task Group 52.2), of the Amphibious Support Force (Task Force 52) on 13 February. After reaching station off Iwo Jima on 16 February, the Anzio aircraft conducted anti-submarine patrol and combat air patrol in defense of the escort carriers of TU 52.2.2 as the aircraft of the latter struck Iwo Jima. Oliver Mitchell was detached to screen TU 52.2.1 on 19 February, which was joined by TU 52.2.2 on 23 February. From 25 February to 4 March she conducted nightly anti-submarine sweeps around the escort carriers as part of TG 50.7. The ship expended depth charges on a false contact on 4 March and on 7 March departed for Leyte with TG 50.7 as land-based aircraft took over anti-submarine patrol duty off Iwo Jima.

The task group arrived in San Pedro Bay, Leyte, on 12 March, remaining there for a brief period of resupply before departing on 21 March for the invasion of Okinawa with the Support Carrier Group. Oliver Mitchell initially screened TU 52.1.2, which included the escort carriers Marcus Island and Savo Island in addition to Anzio. While the task unit conducted gunnery practice on a target sleeve on the next day, fragments from a stray 20 mm round fired by another ship wounded seven sailors aboard her. The ship sent out a swimmer to rescue a crashed Marcus Island fighter pilot on 25 March, the first day of strikes against Okinawa, but the latter drowned before he could be rescued. From 26 March, Oliver Mitchell and her four CortDiv 72 sisters screened TU 52.1.1, centered around Makin Island, Fanshaw Bay, Lunga Point, Natoma Bay, Savo Island, Steamer Bay, and Anzio, during daytime support operations. At night, she and her sisters were detached to conduct anti-submarine sweeps with Anzio. The ship picked up the crew of a crashed Anzio Avenger on 28 March.

Oliver Mitchell put into Kerama Retto with Lunga Point for refueling on 2 April. While anchored that morning, she contributed with her AA guns to flak that helped shoot down a diving Japanese A6M Zero. While Oliver Mitchell returned to TU 52.1.1 with Lunga Point, Melvin R. Nawman, and the destroyer Patterson that night, nearby transports of TU 51.2.1 came under kamikaze attack. AA fire from Oliver Mitchell downed a Ki-45 Nick heading for her and damaged another that crashed into the high-speed transport Dickerson. She returned to Kerama Retto on 6 April, where she met the damaged escort carrier Wake Island. Oliver Mitchell escorted Wake Island back to Guam for repairs, arriving there four days later having sunk a floating mine by gunfire on 7 April. At Guam, the ship entered the Task Force 51 escort pool before departing for Saipan on 14 April. Arriving there on the same day, she departed the next day as part of the escort for a convoy of transports bound for Ulithi. Reaching the destination on 17 April, Oliver Mitchell departed as part of the escort for Okinawa-bound Convoy UOK-2, consisting of cargo ships and auxiliaries, three days later. After a voyage uneventful except for a submarine scare on 24 April that forced a route change, she put into Kerama Retto for resupply before rejoining TU 52.1.1, whose aircraft were still flying support missions off Okinawa, on 27 April.

Oliver Mitchell joined TU 50.7.3, the hunter-killer group centered around the escort carrier Tulagi, on 1 May, replacing her sister William Seiverling, which had departed for repairs. The screen also included sister destroyer escorts Goss, Kendall C. Campbell, and Ulvert M. Moore. After refueling at Kerama Retto on the next day, the task unit departed for anti-submarine patrol along the shipping lanes to Okinawa. This proved uneventful, although Oliver Mitchell fired her Hedgehog against a false contact on 4 May and destroyed a floating mine by gunfire on 18 May. Anzio relieved Tulagi as the anti-submarine carrier on 21 May and she and the destroyer escorts continued the anti-submarine patrols as TU 50.7.1. On 28 May, after Admiral William Halsey took over from Spruance, the group changed its designation to TG 30.6, Tabberer and Robert F. Keller having replaced Goss and Kendall C. Campbell. That day, the group received a report of a possible submarine contact from a minesweeper, and changed course to investigate. An Anzio Avenger spotted a surfaced Japanese submarine, I-361, on the morning of 31 May and sank the latter with a FIDO Homing Torpedo. Reaching the site of the attack, Oliver Mitchell and Tabberer confirmed the sinking by retrieving debris from the submarine.

When Lawrence C. Taylor replaced Ulvert M. Moore in the task group on 1 June, Oliver Mitchell transferred the commander of CortDiv 72 to the former. She was detached on 4 June to return to Ulithi, arriving there two days later for a period of replenishment and routine maintenance. The ship departed for San Pedro Bay on 18 June and arrived there after a three-day journey. Oliver Mitchell departed for Ulithi as part of the screen of TG 30.8, the Third Fleet Logistic Support Group, on 28 June.

A 47-day deployment at sea screening carrier task forces operating off the east coast of Japan followed.

During the next four months, Oliver Mitchell escorted forces to Korea for occupation duty and to and along the China coast trying to assuage postwar unrest in that country. On 26 December, pressed into Operation Magic Carpet duty, Oliver Mitchell headed back to the United States.

== Fate ==
She arrived at San Francisco, California on 15 January 1946 and on 24 April, at San Diego, California, decommissioned and joined the Pacific Reserve Fleet. Later transferred to the Mare Island Reserve Group, she remained a unit of the Reserve Fleet into 1970. She was struck from the Naval Vessel Register on 15 March 1972 before being sold for scrap on 15 January 1973.

== Awards ==
Oliver Mitchell received five battle stars for World War II service, one each for her participation in the Luzon attacks, the Formosa attacks, the assault and occupation of Iwo Jima, the assault and occupation of Okinawa Gunto, and the 3rd Fleet operations against Japan.
