= USS Tabberer =

1944 John C. Butler-class destroyer escort

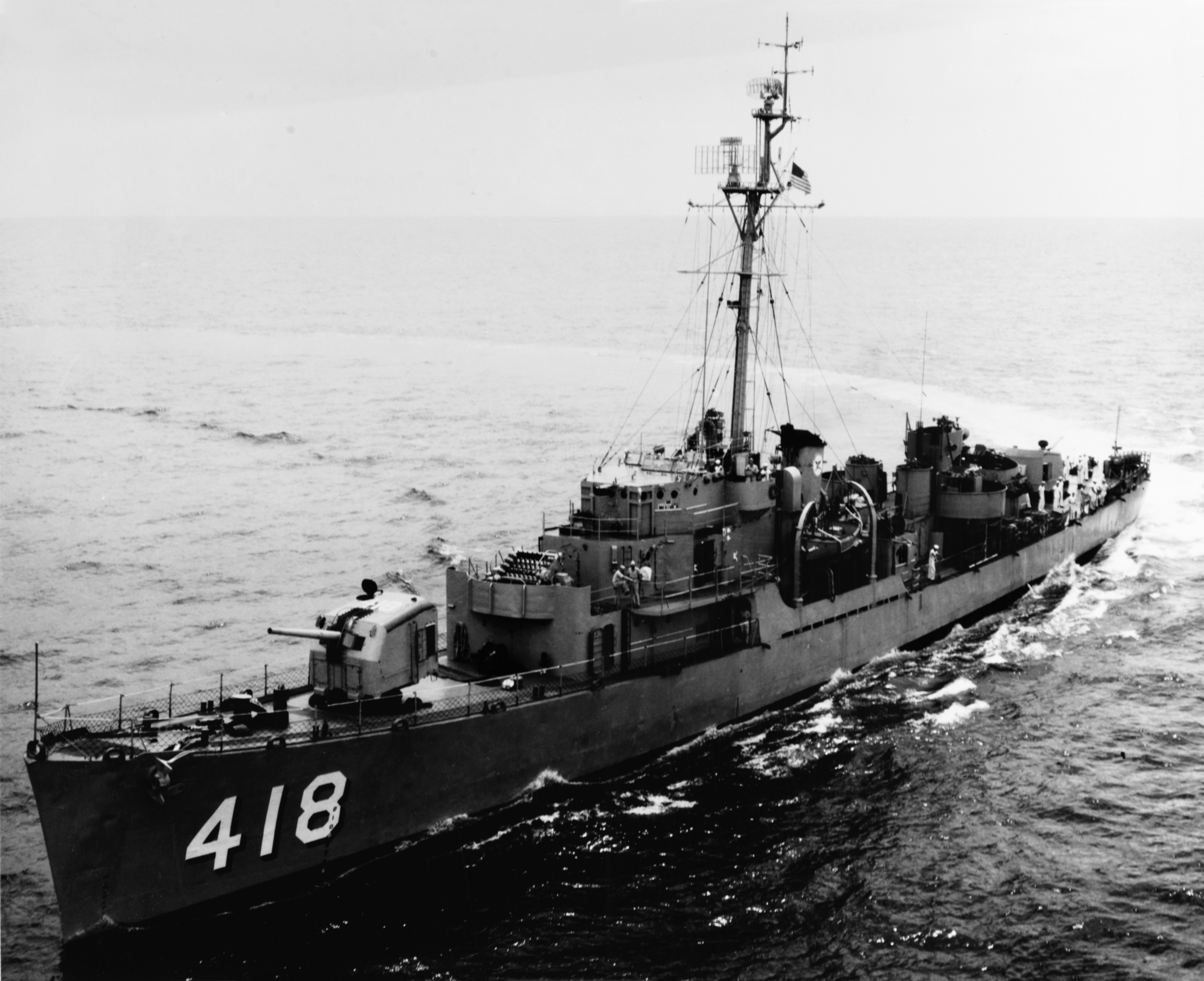
- USS Tabberer (DE-418) underway, c. the 1950s

History

United States
- Name: Tabberer
- Laid down: 12 January 1944
- Launched: 18 February 1944
- Commissioned: 23 May 1944
- Decommissioned: 24 April 1946
- In service: 7 April 1951
- Out of service: May 1960
- Stricken: 1 July 1972
- Fate: Sold for scrapping 3 October 1973

General characteristics
- Class & type: John C. Butler-class destroyer escort
- Displacement: 1,350 long tons (1,372 t)
- Length: 306 ft (93 m) (oa)
- Beam: 36 ft 10 in (11.23 m)
- Draft: 13 ft 4 in (4.06 m) (max)
- Propulsion: 2 boilers, 2 geared steam turbines, 12,000 shp (8,900 kW), 2 screws
- Speed: 24 knots (44 km/h)
- Range: 6,000 nautical miles (11,000 km) at 12 knots (22 km/h)
- Complement: 14 officers, 201 enlisted
- Armament: 2 × single 5 in (127 mm) guns; 2 × twin 40 mm (1.6 in) AA guns; 10 × single 20 mm (0.79 in) AA guns; 1 × triple 21 in (533 mm) torpedo tubes; 8 × depth charge throwers; 1 × Hedgehog ASW mortar; 2 × depth charge racks

USS Tabberer (DE-418) was a John C. Butler-class destroyer escort in service with the United States Navy from 1944 to 1945 and from 1951 to 1959. She was scrapped in 1973.

== Namesake ==
Charles Arthur Tabberer was born on 18 December 1915 in Kansas City, Kansas. He enlisted in the U.S. Naval Reserve on 12 October 1939 and was appointed an aviation cadet on 11 January 1940. Following flight training at Pensacola, Florida and Miami, Florida, Cadet Tabberer was designated a naval aviator on 1 November. He was commissioned an ensign in the Naval Reserve on 12 December. After further training at San Diego, California, he was ordered to report to Fighting Squadron 5 (VF-5) which was then assigned to USS Yorktown.

He served with VF-6 throughout his short naval career. Promoted to lieutenant (junior grade) on 29 May 1942, his squadron was assigned to USS Saratoga for the invasion of Guadalcanal in the southern Solomon Islands. He was one of the 11 "Wildcat" (F4F) pilots lost when elements of the Japanese 26th Air Flotilla opposed the Guadalcanal invasion force on 7 August. Through the efforts of Tabberer and his comrades, the Japanese aerial forces were beaten back. He was posthumously awarded the Distinguished Flying Cross.

== History ==
Tabberer (DE-418)'s keel was laid down at Houston, Texas on 12 January 1944 by the Brown Shipbuilding Co. The ship was launched on 18 February 1944, sponsored by Mrs. Mary M. Tabberer, and commissioned on 23 May 1944, Lt. Comdr. Henry Lee Plage, USNR, in command .

=== 1944 ===
On 27 June 1944, Tabberer headed toward Bermuda for shakedown training. At the end of a fortnight's post-shakedown availability at the Boston Navy Yard, she got underway on 16 August to escort the oiler USS Severn to the Hawaiian Islands. The two ships transited the Panama Canal late that month and reached Pearl Harbor on 7 September. For over a month, the destroyer escort conducted underway training in the waters surrounding the islands. Her exercises included antisubmarine warfare drills and gunfire practice. She also screened carriers USS Coral Sea, USS Ranger, and USS Saratoga during night flying qualifications and amphibious support training.

On 16 October, Tabberer sortied from Pearl Harbor with Task Group (TG) 12.7, a hunter-killer group built around USS Anzio, formerly USS Coral Sea. Upon arrival at Eniwetok on 23 October, the ships joined Admiral Halsey's U.S. 3rd Fleet and, on 27 October, stood out of Eniwetok as task group TG 30.7. After stopping at Ulithi during the first three days of November, the task group headed for the 3d Fleet fueling group's operating area to conduct antisubmarine sweeps.

On 18 November, task group TG 30.7 registered its first kill when Tabberer's sister ship Lawrence C. Taylor sent the Japanese submarine I-41 to the bottom after a coordinated depth charge attack with USS Melvin R. Nawman. Following a replenishment period at Ulithi, Tabberer sortied with TG 30.7 on 9 December to resume antisubmarine sweeps of the Philippine Sea during Task Force 38's Luzon strikes in support of the Mindoro landings.

=== Typhoon Cobra ===
On 17 December, as Tabberer was steaming in company with the 3d Fleet fueling group to the east of the Philippine Islands, rising wind and a choppy sea forced her to break off preparations to take on fuel. The barometer dropped precipitously as the weather grew worse. By evening, the warship was fighting a full typhoon, Typhoon Cobra. During the night, Tabberer lost steerageway and could not fight her way out of the deep troughs. She frequently took rolls up to 60 degrees and, on several occasions, approached an angle of 72 degrees from the vertical.

The high winds and seas continued to batter her on the 18th. By 1830, her mast and radio antennas were gone. At 2130, a signalman trying to rig an emergency antenna sounded the "man overboard" alarm. Tabberer rushed to the rescue. Once on board, the sailor reported that he was from USS Hull and that his ship had gone down about noon that day. Thus, she was the first ship of the U.S. 3rd Fleet to learn of the tragedy of 18 December 1944.

Unable to call for help, she immediately embarked upon a search for other survivors. Her rescue efforts continued through the night, all day on 19 December, and into 20 December. In all, she saved 55 officers and men both from Hull and Spence. Later, Tabberer was relieved by other units of the fleet, and they rescued an additional 36 men, a few of whom belonged to the crew of the typhoon's third victim Monaghan. Outstanding rescue efforts during the storm won several members of Tabberer's crew Navy and Marine Corps medals—Lt. Comdr. Plage, the Legion of Merit, and the ship, the Navy Unit Commendation. On 29 December, Admiral Halsey commended the crew when he visited the ship and awarded Lt. Comdr. Plage the Legion of Merit for his "courageous leadership and excellent seamanship".

=== 1945-1946 ===
On 21 December, the destroyer escort reentered Ulithi lagoon before heading back to Hawaii. She stopped at Eniwetok early in January 1945 and reached Oahu soon thereafter. Following a short availability, she stood out of Pearl Harbor on 29 January. She steamed via Eniwetok and Saipan to screen Task Force TF 58 during the air strikes in support of the U.S. Marines who stormed ashore at Iwo Jima on 19 February. Tabberer remained in the Volcano Islands through the first week of March, screening the carriers from enemy submarines and aircraft. Though the task force was subjected to several air attacks and carriers suffered kamikaze and bomb hits, Tabberer sustained no damage. On 7 March, she headed for the Philippines and entered San Pedro Bay Leyte, on 12 March.

From late March to early May, the destroyer escort cruised with various task groups of TF 38 during the invasion of Okinawa. Once again, she protected the American carriers from Japanese submarines and aircraft while their planes struck enemy positions. Although she operated continuously for 52 days and sighted many unidentified planes, the ship never came under attack. Frequently, she rejoined the Anzio hunter/killer group for night antisubmarine sweeps.

Tabberer put into Apra Harbor, Guam, on 11 May to replenish and make repairs. On 23 May, she departed again and rejoined Anzio for further antisubmarine operations on the sea lanes between Okinawa and the Marianas. On 31 May, Anzio planes scored a kill, and Tabberer assisted USS Oliver Mitchell in recovering evidence of their success. Following a visit, lasting just over a fortnight, to San Pedro Bay, Leyte, she resumed antisubmarine sweeps with the Anzio task group. For the remainder of the war, she hunted Japanese submarines and protected the logistics group during the 3rd Fleet's final air assault on the Japanese home islands. During the final month of the war, she destroyed mines and rescued four downed Anzio air crewmen.

After the cessation of hostilities on 15 August 1945, Tabberer remained in the Far East to support the occupation forces. She escorted ships between Okinawa; Jinsen, Korea, and Tientsin and Taku, China. She also destroyed mines in the Yellow Sea. On 22 December, the little warship departed Qingdao, China, to return to the United States. Along the way, she made stops at Okinawa, Eniwetok, and Pearl Harbor before entering San Francisco, California, on 15 January 1946. In April, she shifted to San Diego, California, where she was placed out of commission, in reserve, on 24 April 1946.

=== 1951-1959 ===
Tabberer was recommissioned at San Diego on 7 April 1951, Lt. Comdr. Willard J. McNulty in command . In June, she changed home ports from San Diego to Newport, Rhode Island, and in August reported for duty with the Atlantic Fleet. For the next nine years, she operated along the Atlantic seaboard from Key West, Florida, to Halifax, Nova Scotia. Frequently, she operated in the Caribbean area, often near Guantánamo Bay and Vieques Island. Tabberer participated in a variety of exercises and, on several occasions, embarked U.S. Naval Academy and NROTC midshipmen for their summer cruises. She left the western Atlantic only once during this period—in the fall of 1957—for a two-month deployment to the Mediterranean. After that, she resumed her operations along the east coast.

== Fate ==
On 19 April 1959, the destroyer escort put into port for the last time. At Philadelphia, Pennsylvania, she began preparations for deactivation. Tabberer was placed out of commission, in reserve, in May 1960 and was berthed at Philadelphia for the remainder of her career. On 1 August 1972, her name was struck from the Navy List and, on 3 October 1973, she was sold for scrapping to Mr. David Hahn of Key West, Florida.

== Legacy ==
Because of wartime censors, the story of the typhoon was largely muted during the war, with an emphasis on the rescue, which made national headlines. More recently, two major books have been published on the incident which highlight the story of riding out the typhoon and rescue operation. The 2007 book Halsey's Typhoon: The True Story of a Fighting Admiral, an Epic Storm, and an Untold Rescue by Bob Drury & Tom Clavin devotes a major portion to the rescue operation and how the ship was presented awards by Admiral Halsey himself. The account of Commander Plage is also highlighted in the recent book Sea Cobra: Admiral Halsey's Task Force and the Great Pacific Typhoon by Buckner F. Melton Jr. A 2007 History Channel documentary also highlighted the DE's role, and that an official court of inquiry recommended that Halsey be relieved of his duties after a second typhoon incident.

== Awards ==
Tabberer earned four battle stars and a Navy Unit Commendation for service in World War II.
