= USS Alikula Bay =

Two ships of the United States Navy have been named Alikula Bay for one of the bays on Coronation Island in Alaska.

- USS Alikula Bay (ACV-57) was a Casablanca-class escort carrier, renamed and redesignated as USS Coral Sea (CVE-57) at commissioning in August 1943, and renamed again to Anzio (CVE-57) in September 1944.
- USS Alikula Bay (CVE-95) was a separate Casablanca-class escort carrier, launched on 18 April 1944, then renamed USS Bismarck Sea on 16 May 1944.
