= Henry Lee Plage =

American naval officer

- Born: February 10, 1915; Oklahoma City, Oklahoma, US
- Died: September 24, 2003 (aged 88); Ocala, Florida, US
- Military career
- Allegiance: United States
- Branch: United States Naval Reserve
- Service years: 1937–1954
- Rank: Lieutenant commander
- Unit: Tabberer
- Conflicts: Pacific Ocean theater of World War II
- Awards: Legion of Merit

Henry Lee Plage (February 19, 1915 – September 24, 2003) was an American naval officer best known for his role in the recovery of sailors from Task Force 38 during Typhoon Cobra.

== Before World War II ==
Henry Lee Plage joined the Naval ROTC at Georgia Tech, where he majored in industrial management and swam competitively. After graduating in 1937, he was commissioned as an ensign of the U.S. Naval Reserve. He married Marjorie Armstrong and moved to Florida, where he worked as an insurance adjuster. In January 1941, he requested and received active duty, but he was not given sea duty.

== World War II ==
Following the Japanese attack on Pearl Harbor, Plage again requested sea duty. In May 1942, he took command of USS PC-464, a submarine chaser out of Panama with a crew of 55.

In late 1943, he was assigned to Evarts-class destroyer escort USS LeHardy (DE-20) as executive officer.

His next command was another Evarts-class, USS Donaldson, which he sailed from Pearl Harbor to the Marshall Islands.

In May 1944, Plage assumed his third command, the John C. Butler-class destroyer escort USS Tabberer, upon its commission in Houston. After sea trials, the "Tabby" was sent to the Pacific in the Anzio group of TF 38.

=== Typhoon Cobra Rescue Effort ===
Admiral William "Bull" Halsey inadvertently sailed TF 38 into a tropical cyclone on December 17, 1944. The storm intensified the following day, capsizing and sinking three destroyers, including the USS Hull and the USS Spence, although the rest of the task force was not aware of the sinkings. A Tabberer radioman rigging an emergency antenna noticed a light that turned out to be a sailor from Hull on the night of the 18th. After recovering the sailor and learning of the sinking, Tabberer began a search for survivors that recovered 55 officers and men from Hull and Spence. Tabberer repaired her radio and called other ships, who arrived on the 20th and rescued an additional 36 men.

On December 20, Plage sent a memorandum to all hands:

As you all know, we have just been through quite an experience. We were in the middle of the most severe type of storm there is, a tropical typhoon that came up without warning. We were lucky to escape with our lives. The only reason we pulled through was that God was looking out for the old "Tabby".

Every man on board showed a wonderful spirit during the storm. No group of men could have worked harder under trying and dangerous circumstances then you men did.

The forty hours following the storm doubly proved what you men are made of. Most of you went for a total of three days and two night without sleep or rest. I honestly don't think you would have slept for a week if we had stayed in the area looking for just one man. Through your efforts we saved the lives of forty-one men from the U.S.S HULL (DD 350) and fourteen men from the U.S.S SPENCE (DD 512), a total of fifty five men.

Following the typhoon, the Tabberer put into Ulithi. Admiral Halsey visited the ship on December 29 and awarded Lt. Comdr. Plage the Legion of Merit for his "courageous leadership and excellent seamanship." He also commended the crew and presented them with the Navy Unit Commendation.

Plage led the Tabberer on anti-submarine and anti-mine patrols for the remainder of the war, supporting the invasions of Iwo Jima and Okinawa, and also rescuing four downed airmen.

== Post-war life ==
Plage and the Tabberer conducted anti-mine and escort duty following the Surrender of Japan. He returned Tabberer to San Diego, where she would be decommissioned in April 1946. His next assignment was at the Naval War College. He retired from the Navy in 1954.

Plage later worked as a pharmaceutical distributor and in 1980 moved to Ocala, Florida, where he died in 2003 at the age of 88. At the time of Marjorie's death in 1998, Plage had two sons, two grandchildren, and a great-grandchild. A plaque in his memory can be found at Silver Springs Shore Presbyterian Church, where he and Marjorie were members.
