= USS Robert F. Keller =

United States Naval Destroyer

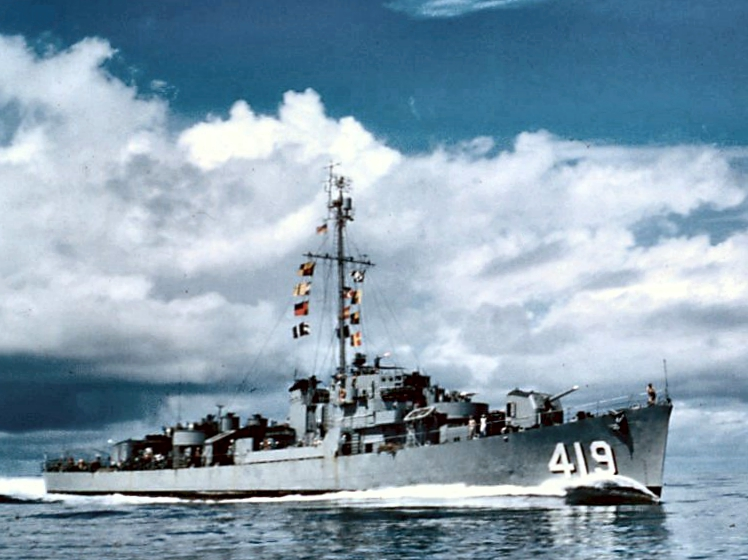

History

United States
- Name: Robert F. Keller
- Laid down: 12 January 1944
- Launched: 19 February 1944
- Commissioned: 17 June 1944
- Decommissioned: 24 April 1946
- In service: 13th Naval District, September 1946
- Out of service: January 1965
- Stricken: 1 July 1972
- Fate: Sold for scrapping 5 February 1974

General characteristics
- Class & type: John C. Butler-class destroyer escort
- Displacement: 1,350 long tons (1,372 t)
- Length: 306 ft (93 m) (oa)
- Beam: 36 ft 10 in (11.23 m)
- Draft: 13 ft 4 in (4.06 m) (max)
- Propulsion: 2 boilers, 2 geared steam turbines, 12,000 shp (8,900 kW), 2 screws
- Speed: 24 knots (44 km/h)
- Range: 6,000 nautical miles (11,000 km) at 12 knots (22 km/h)
- Complement: 14 officers, 201 enlisted
- Armament: 2 × single 5 in (127 mm) guns; 2 × twin 40 mm (1.6 in) AA guns; 10 × single 20 mm (0.79 in) AA guns; 1 × triple 21 in (533 mm) torpedo tubes; 8 × depth charge throwers; 1 × Hedgehog ASW mortar; 2 × depth charge racks

USS Robert F. Keller (DE-419) was a John C. Butler-class destroyer escort in service with the United States Navy from 1943 to 1965. She was scrapped in 1974.

== History ==
Robert F. Keller was named in honor of Robert Franklin Keller, born in Denver, Colorado, 16 January 1918, who was awarded the Air Medal as second pilot of a patrol plane in action against enemy Japanese forces during the Aleutian Islands Campaign 10 to 20 June 1942. The ship's keel was laid down by Brown Shipbuilding Co. at their yard in Houston, Texas on 12 January 1944. The ship was launched on 1 February 1944, sponsored by Mrs. Peter S. Keller, and commissioned on 17 June 1944.

=== World War II ===
Following shakedown off Bermuda, Robert F. Keller escorted the seaplane tender Currituck to the Panama Canal Zone, then transited the Panama Canal on 7 September 1944. She picked up a convoy of four Pearl Harbor-bound merchantmen at San Francisco, California, and escorted them safely to their destination. Arriving on 1 October, Robert F. Keller joined Escort Division 72, assigned to screen the aircraft carrier Coral Sea (soon renamed Anzio). With the U.S. 3rd Fleet, the group sailed to the Western Carolines arriving 1 November. This became Robert F. Keller's advance base for operations until February 1945. During this time her task group, designated 30.7, conducted antisubmarine sweeps as a hunter-killer group in the Philippine Sea and adjacent waters. On 22 December 1944 Robert F. Keller rescued four survivors of the capsized destroyer Hull, victim of a typhoon.

On 28 January 1945 all ships of task group TG 30.7 were assigned to the U.S. 5th Fleet and proceeded on 2 February to cover a group of transports in their voyage from Eniwetok to Saipan. At this newly annexed Pacific island, Robert F. Keller was attached to Air Support Unit 2 and was with that division as it participated in the Iwo Jima campaign of February 1945. While acting as carrier screen, on the night of 21 February, her crew witnessed the sinking of escort carrier Bismarck Sea during a kamikaze attack. She remained in the Iwo area until 7 March and then retired to Leyte Island in the Philippines for upkeep and repair in preparation for the Okinawa operation.

Robert F. Keller was ready for the operation by 21 March 1945 and proceeded to Okinawa, destroying three floating mines en route. Her duties were identical to those she had known in the Iwo campaign, acting as air defense and antisubmarine screen for the carriers involved in covering the invasion from the air. The ship left the area on 27 April escorting the escort carrier Anzio to Ulithi. She was back in the war on 10 May escorting the cruiser San Francisco to the Okinawa battleline and then guarded the convoy lanes around the beleaguered island fortress. She returned to Leyte for availability on 17 June.

Task Group 30.6 set out again on 6 July on what was to be Robert F. Keller's last combat operation of the war, antisubmarine sweeps east of Tokyo. Ten days later Robert F. Keller assisted in a kill when Lawrence C. Taylor caught the Japanese submarine I-13 on the surface and raked her with gunfire until she sank. When the end of hostilities was announced, Robert F. Keller proceeded to Guam.

After escorting transports loaded with occupation troops to Jinsen, Korea, on 8 September, Robert F. Keller returned to Okinawa on 22 September. She remained in the Far East for the rest of the year, calling at several Chinese ports.

=== Naval Reserve duty ===
Robert F. Keller decommissioned 24 April 1946 at San Diego, California. In September 1946 she was placed "in service" and assigned to the 13th Naval District at Puget Sound, Washington, to lend her assistance in the Navy's Reserve training program. In January 1950, she sailed to the east coast via the Panama Canal and was placed "in commission in reserve" on 31 March 1950, assigned as Naval Reserve training ship at Washington, D.C., under Commandant, Potomac River Naval Command. On 18 November 1950, she was again placed on "active status in commission" and trained reserves while maintaining war readiness. Through 1955 she made 39 cruises and assisted in the training of over 3,500 reserve officers and enlisted men and visited most major ports in eastern Canada, the West Indies, and the United States. She continued this duty until 1959, sometimes crossing the Atlantic to visit European ports.

=== Berlin crisis ===
On 21 September 1959 Robert F. Keller decommissioned and was placed "in service" assigned to Naval Reserve training in Baltimore, Maryland, under the Commandant, 5th Naval District. She recommissioned pm 2 October 1961 incident to the Berlin Crisis and was crewed by reserves, steaming in the Atlantic and Caribbean during the rest of the year. She again decommissioned and was placed "in service" as a Naval Reserve training ship of the 5th Naval District on 1 August 1962.

== Fate ==
She was placed out of commission in reserve at Philadelphia, Pennsylvania, in January 1965, where she remained until 1972. After survey, in the spring of 1972, Robert F. Keller was found to be unfit for further service and was stricken from the Navy list 1 July 1972.

== Awards ==
No record of awards for this vessel found in Navy records.
