= USS Anzio (CVE-57) =

Casablanca-class escort carrier of the U.S. Navy

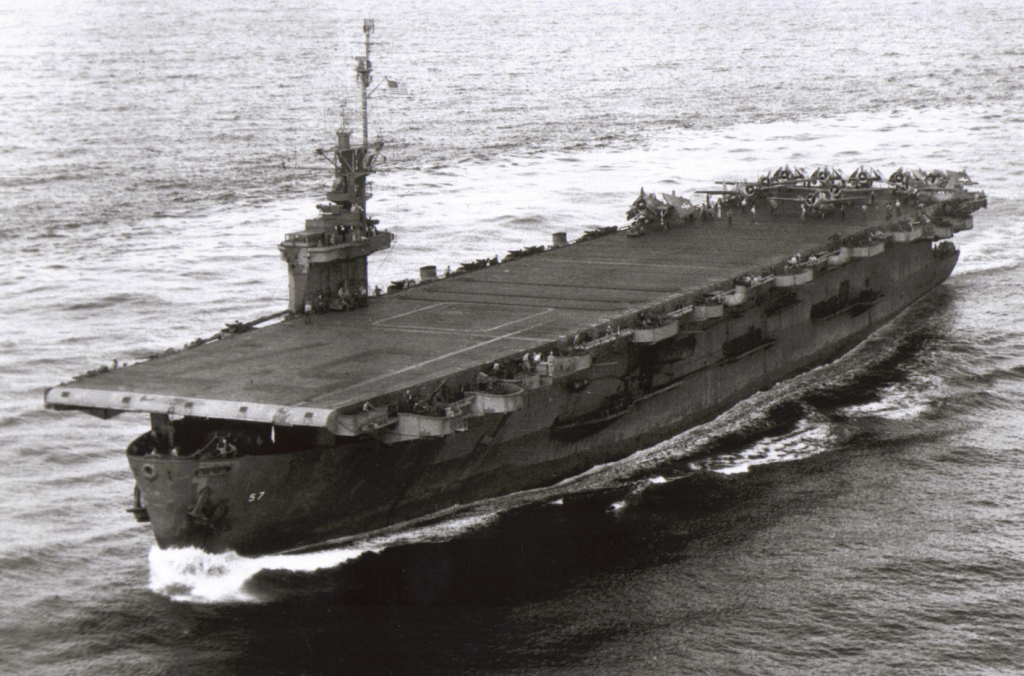
- USS Anzio (then Coral Sea) underway, 1943

History

United States
- Name: Alikula Bay (1943); Coral Sea (1943–1944); Anzio (1944–1959)
- Namesake: Alikula Bay, Coronation Island, Alaska; Battle of the Coral Sea; Battle of Anzio
- Builder: Kaiser Shipbuilding Company, Vancouver, Washington, US
- Laid down: 12 December 1942
- Launched: 1 May 1943
- Commissioned: 27 August 1943
- Decommissioned: 5 August 1946
- Stricken: 1 March 1959
- Identification: Hull symbol: ACV-57 (1943); CVE-57 (1943–1955); CVHE-57 (1955–1959)
- Honors and awards: 9 Battle Stars; Navy Unit Commendation
- Fate: Sold for scrap, 24 November 1959

General characteristics
- Class & type: Casablanca-class escort carrier
- Displacement: 8,188 long tons (8,319 t) (standard); 10,902 long tons (11,077 t) (full load)
- Length: 512 ft 3 in (156.13 m) (oa); 490 ft (150 m) (wl); 474 ft (144 m) (fd)
- Beam: 65 ft 2 in (19.86 m); 108 ft (33 m) (extreme width)
- Draft: 20 ft 9 in (6.32 m) (max)
- Installed power: 4 × Babcock & Wilcox boilers; 9,000 shp (6,700 kW)
- Propulsion: 2 × Skinner Unaflow reciprocating steam engines; 2 × screws
- Speed: 19 knots (35 km/h; 22 mph)
- Range: 10,200 nmi (18,900 km; 11,700 mi) at 15 kn (28 km/h; 17 mph)
- Complement: 860 (ship's crew)
- Sensors & processing systems: 1 × SG radar, 1 × SK radar
- Armament: As designed: 1 × 5 in (127 mm)/38 cal dual-purpose gun; 4 × twin 40 mm (1.57 in) Bofors anti-aircraft guns; 12 × 20 mm (0.79 in) Oerlikon anti-aircraft cannons; Varied, ultimate armament: 1 × 5 in (127 mm)/38 cal dual-purpose gun; 8 × twin 40 mm (1.57 in) Bofors anti-aircraft guns; 20 × 20 mm (0.79 in) Oerlikon anti-aircraft cannons
- Aviation facilities: 1 × catapult; 2 × elevators

USS Anzio (ACV/CVE/CVHE-57), known as USS Coral Sea until September 1944, was the third of fifty Casablanca-class escort carriers built for the United States Navy during World War II. She was the first U.S. Navy vessel to be named after the Battle of the Coral Sea, a major naval engagement in the Pacific War, as well as the first to be named for the Battle of Anzio, an amphibious landing in the Italian campaign.

In December 1942, she was laid down in Vancouver, Washington, by the Kaiser Shipbuilding Company. She was named Alikula Bay in January 1943, renamed Coral Sea in April, launched in May, and commissioned in August. She participated in the Battle of Makin, the Battle of Kwajalein, the Western New Guinea campaign, and the Battle of Saipan. While she was conducting preparatory airstrikes for the Battle of Guam, her engines failed, forcing her to return to the West Coast for repairs. In September 1944, she was renamed Anzio, and took part in the Philippines campaign, the Battle of Iwo Jima, and the Battle of Okinawa. During this period, in December 1944, she weathered Typhoon Cobra and aided in the search for survivors. As Anzio, she operated primarily in an anti-submarine role, contributing to the sinking of five Japanese submarines. After the war, she participated in Operation Magic Carpet, repatriating U.S. servicemen from around the Pacific. She was decommissioned in August 1946 and mothballed in the Atlantic Reserve Fleet. She was sold for scrap in 1959.

== Design and description ==
A side profile of the design of Thetis Bay

Anzio was a Casablanca-class escort carrier, the most numerous type of aircraft carrier ever built. They were intended to be used for anti-submarine warfare, coming into service in late 1943, by which time the U-boats were already in retreat. Some did see service in the Atlantic, but the majority were utilized in the Pacific, ferrying aircraft, providing logistics support, and conducting close air support for the island-hopping campaigns. They were built on the standardized Type S4-S2-BB3 hull, a lengthened variant of the Doyen-class hull, and specifically designed to be mass-produced using welded prefabricated sections. This allowed them to be produced at unprecedented speeds: the final ship of her class, Munda, was delivered to the Navy just 101 days after the laying of her keel.

Anzio was 512 ft 3 in (156.13 m) long overall and 490 ft (150 m) at the waterline. She had a beam of 65 ft 2 in (19.86 m), and a draft of 20 ft 9 in (6.32 m). She displaced 8,188 long tons (8,319 t) standard, which increased to 10,902 long tons (11,077 t) with a full load. To carry out flight operations, the ship had a 257 ft (78 m) hangar deck and a 474 ft (144 m) flight deck. Her compact size necessitated the installation of an aircraft catapult, positioned at her bow, and there were two aircraft elevators to facilitate movement of aircraft between the flight and hangar deck: one each fore and aft. She had two Skinner Unaflow reciprocating steam engines delivering 9,000 shp (6,700 kW) to two propellers for a top speed of 19 kn (35 km/h; 22 mph). Her armament consisted of one 5 in (127 mm)/38 caliber dual-purpose gun, eight Bofors 40 mm (1.57 in) guns, and twelve Oerlikon 20 mm (0.79 in) cannons, supported by an SG surface-search radar and an SK air-search radar. By 1945, the standard armament for the Casablanca-class carriers had grown to twenty Oerlikon cannons and sixteen Bofors guns.

== Construction ==
Anzio was laid down on 12 December 1942 as MCE hull 1094, the third of fifty Casablanca-class escort carriers. Her initial hull symbol ACV-57 designated her as an auxiliary aircraft carrier. On 22 January 1943, she received her initial name of Alikula Bay, her namesake being a bay on the northwest coast of Coronation Island, Alaska. She was subsequently renamed Coral Sea on 3 April, becoming the first ship to be named after the Battle of the Coral Sea. Her hull was launched on 1 May, sponsored by Martha Richards Fletcher, the wife of Vice Admiral Frank Jack Fletcher. On 15 July, the U.S. Navy revised the classification of its escort carriers to reflect their combatant status, providing Coral Sea with her wartime hull symbol of CVE-57. Problems with her boilers twice delayed her commissioning, but she was transferred to the Navy on 27 August. In total, her construction and outfitting cost $9,627,180 (equivalent to $139,172,600 in 2024).

== Service history ==
=== Gilbert and Marshall Islands ===
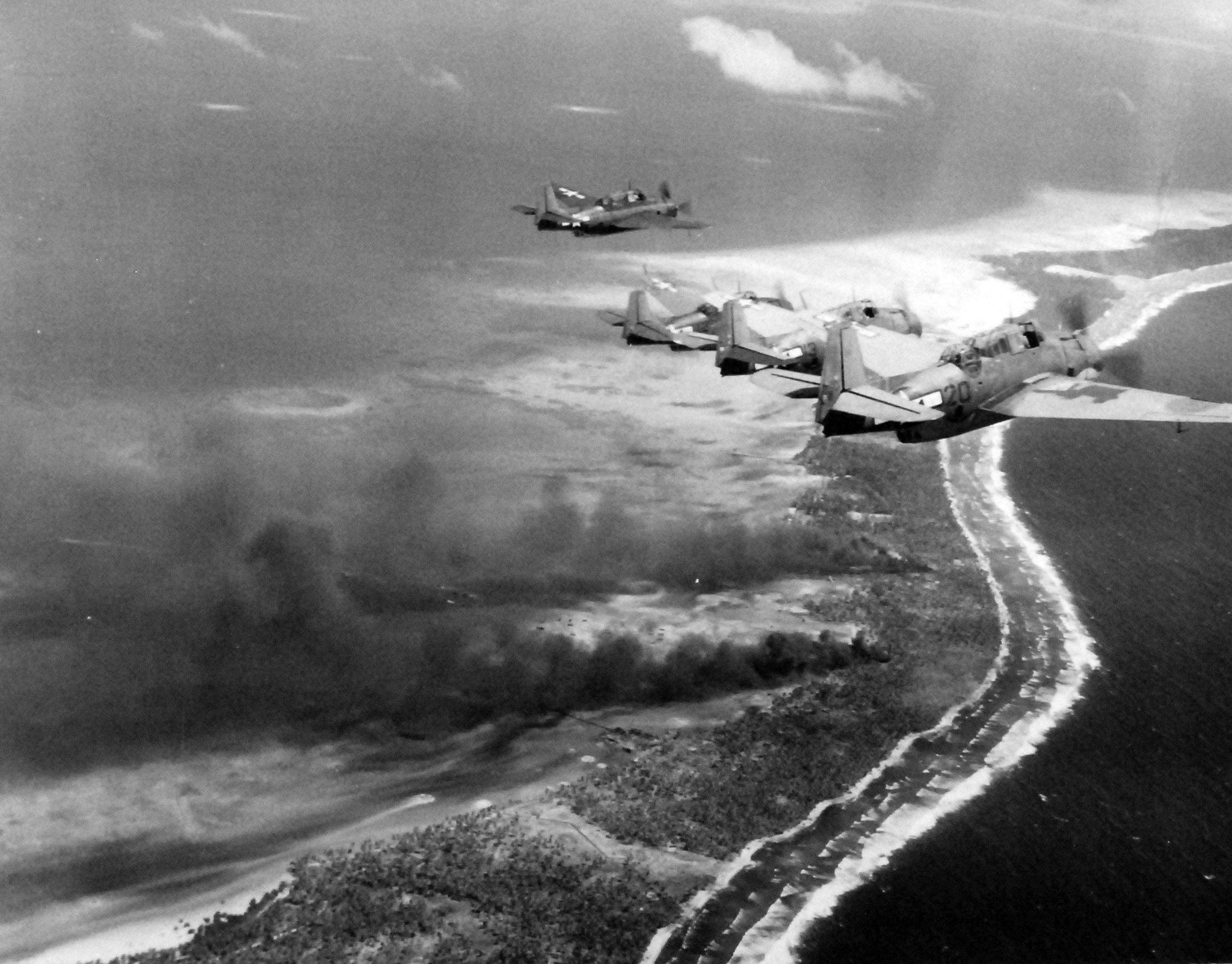
TBF-1 Avengers of Composite Squadron (VC) 33, based on Coral Sea, on patrol over Makin Island, 20 November 1943

Coral Sea spent much of September 1943 being fitted out at U.S. Naval Ship Yard Tongue Point in Astoria, Oregon. She then underwent a shakedown cruise down the West Coast, heading to Naval Air Station North Island in San Diego, California. En route, gunnery drills, crew training, and lecture classes were conducted. She arrived at San Diego on 8 October, taking on Composite Squadron (VC) 33 for a period of flight training off the California coast. On 25 October, she departed for Pearl Harbor to join Rear Admiral Henry M. Mullinnix's Carrier Division 24, which consisted of Coral Sea along with her sister ships Liscome Bay and Corregidor. The newly formed carrier division participated in training exercises and drills until early November. They were then assigned to support the 27th Infantry Division as it invaded Makin Island, as part of the Gilbert and Marshall Islands campaign. She sortied from Pearl Harbor for Makin on 10 November.

At 05:00 on 20 November, the bombardment of Makin began, marking the first major U.S. thrust into the central Pacific. Coral Sea's aircraft aided the operation, providing close air support and bombing Japanese positions. The inexperience of the aircrews was evident, with little of the air-ground coordination that would become a characteristic in later American amphibious operations. Furthermore, the three escort carriers of Carrier Division 24 were plagued by accidents that killed four airmen and six deck personnel and caused the loss of sixteen aircraft.

With the islands secured, U.S. naval forces began retiring, but Carrier Division 24 stayed behind to suppress pockets of resistance. On 24 November, the Japanese Kaidai-type submarine I-175 fired a set of four Type 95 torpedoes towards the side of the unsuspecting task force. Two of the torpedoes narrowly missed Coral Sea, but one torpedo hit Liscome Bay at 05:10, setting off her munitions stores and blowing apart the entire stern of the carrier. The tremendous explosion sent debris hurtling onto the surrounding ships, including Coral Sea, which was 2,200 yd (2,000 m) off her port beam. Coral Sea's navigation officer estimated that debris was shot up to 1 mi (1.6 km) high, while one of her sailors reported being hit by a fire extinguisher originating from Liscome Bay. Twenty-three minutes later, Liscome Bay slipped beneath the waves. Coral Sea's War History describes her crew standing in "stunned silence", staring at the empty waters where Carrier Division 24's flagship once was.

On 28 November, Coral Sea left Makin. She reached Pearl Harbor on 5 December, where she took on passengers and aircraft to ferry back to the West Coast. She arrived at Alameda, California, on 14 December, where her aircraft were replenished. Leaving Alameda on 22 December, she entered Pearl Harbor on 28 December, joining Corregidor and Manila Bay, the new flagship of Carrier Division 24. There, she prepared for the impending assault on Kwajalein.

Coral Sea was underway on 3 January 1944, conducting exercises off Hawaii through early January. After a final fitting out, she sailed out on 22 January in Task Group 52.9, arriving off Kwajalein on 31 January, the day of the landings. Her aircraft flew anti-submarine patrols, provided an air screen for the invasion fleet, and launched strikes in support of American forces. On 24 February, Carrier Division 24 set course to support operations on Eniwetok. En route on 25 February, Coral Sea and Corregidor were both recalled to Pearl Harbor.

=== Solomon Islands and New Guinea ===
After a layover at Pearl Harbor, Coral Sea got underway again on 11 March and proceeded to the Solomon Islands. She anchored at Tulagi on 21 March, refueling and resupplying before setting off on 30 March for Emirau Island alongside Corregidor. On 2 April, they relieved Manila Bay and Natoma Bay, which had been supporting the 4th Marine Regiment as they landed on Emirau. Her time at Emirau was uneventful, save for a Mitsubishi G4M medium bomber shot down by two of her fighters on 6 April. She concluded her tour at Emirau on 11 April, returning to Tulagi on 15 April and leaving the next day to assist in the Western New Guinea campaign. On 19 April, she joined Task Group 78.2, which was formed to cover the landings at Aitape. Her aircraft commenced strikes on D-Day, 22 April, and found little opposition. Task Group 78.2 then relieved the Fast Carrier Task Force in supporting the landings at Tanahmerah Bay and Humboldt Bay, but they found similarly sparse resistance. With the beachhead secured, Coral Sea entered Seeadler Harbor on 4 May, where her engines were evaluated. She returned to Espiritu Santo on 7 May for extensive repairs to her forward main engine, involving the replacement of several broken piston rings. It was not until 2 June that she was deemed combat-ready again. (Note: Engine problems would be a chronic source of trouble for the Casablanca-class carriers throughout the war. Although each engine could, on paper, output 4,500 shp (3,400 kW) at 161 RPM (revolutions per minute), crews often found that they had to be run at speeds of 178 to 182 RPM or higher. These excessive speeds caused wear and tear to the machinery, in particular to the piston rings.)

=== Mariana Islands ===
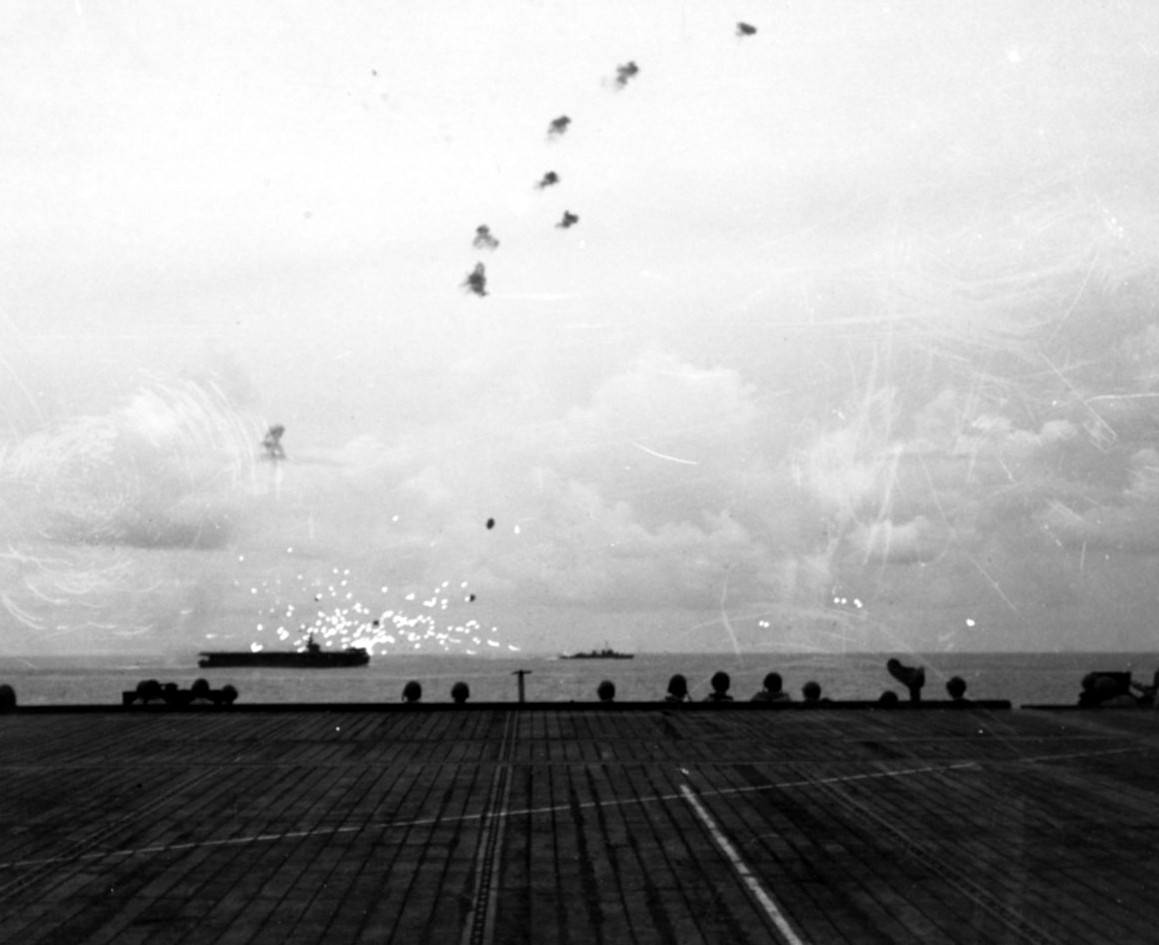
The view from Coral Sea, 17 June 1944

Following the completion of repairs, Coral Sea arrived on 8 June at Kwajalein, which was serving as the staging point for the Mariana and Palau Islands campaign. The invasion fleet sortied out on 10 June, and on 15 June, she provided air support for the initial landings on Saipan by the 2nd Marine Division. On 16 June, she was briefly dispatched for the planned recapture of Guam. En route, Admiral Raymond A. Spruance indefinitely postponed the landings on Guam after U.S. submarines spotted the 1st Mobile Fleet as it sortied into the Philippine Sea. Coral Sea returned to Saipan on the afternoon of 17 June.

Triggered by the Marianas invasion, Admiral Soemu Toyoda had put into motion Plan A-Go, which had been developed by Admiral Shigetarō Shimada, Chief of the Naval Staff. In accordance with the Imperial Japanese Navy's doctrine of Kantai Kessen, it anticipated a decisive naval action that would destroy the American fleet. To the west of Coral Sea and her fellow escort carriers, Admiral Jisaburō Ozawa's 1st Mobile Fleet would engage Spruance's Fifth Fleet from 19–20 June in the Battle of the Philippine Sea, the largest carrier-to-carrier engagement in history. In conjunction with Plan A-Go, Shimada had drawn up Plan To-Go, which directed Vice Admiral Kakuji Kakuta's land-based aircraft of the 1st Air Fleet to destroy at least one-third of the American carriers prior to the decisive battle. Of the approximately 600 planes at hand for To-Go, 172 aircraft were based in the Mariana Islands, with the rest scattered throughout the Carolines–Philippines area, where the Japanese were expecting the next American campaign to take place. Although the 1st Air Fleet was well equipped with first-line aircraft, about half of its pilots were fresh from flight qualification, having had no live-fire aerial gunnery or dogfighting training.

On 17 June, 31 Mitsubishi A6M Zero fighters, 17 Yokosuka D4Y Suisei dive bombers, and 2 Yokosuka P1Y Ginga bombers took off from Yap to strike Saipan. The Americans had picked up the raid on radar at 17:35, and the escort carriers scrambled a combined 46 fighters in response. However, the fighter direction was inaccurate, and only 9 managed to intercept. At Saipan, the Japanese attacked ships unloading in Charan Kanoa, but the raid was generally unsuccessful. Turning around, the Japanese raid made contact with the escort carriers at 18:48, around sunset. At 18:51, a Suisei targeted Coral Sea, but its aim was off and the bomb fell 100 ft (30 m) to her starboard quarter. Shortly afterwards, the Suisei went into the water 300 yd (270 m) behind the carrier. Two minutes later, a torpedo bomber approached from Coral Sea's port at an altitude of 50 ft (15 m). Hit by a flak explosion, it broke apart and careened into the water 400 ft (120 m) from Coral Sea. After a short lull, a disorganized attack was mounted by several remaining Japanese aircraft. Taken under fire by Coral Sea's gunners, another plane was shot down 2,000 yd (1,800 m) from her port quarter.

The Japanese, having misidentified their targets as fleet carriers in the failing light, erroneously believed that they had sunk three or four carriers of the Fast Carrier Task Force. In reality, of the eleven escort carriers operating near Saipan, none had been sunk, although Fanshaw Bay was forced to withdraw for repairs. Greatly encouraged by their perceived success, they resolved to make a further attack the next day. On Tinian, Vice Admiral Kakuta misled Admiral Ozawa with glowing reports about the success of To-Go. These reports helped convince Ozawa to attempt to continue the battle on 21 June, even after his enormous losses in aircraft had become apparent.

On 18 June, at 16:15, another group of an estimated 30–50 Japanese planes was detected by radar 97 mi (156 km) to the south of Coral Sea. This time, the fighter screen proved to be more effective, with her planes claiming eight Suiseis (Note: Misidentified in the action report as Kawasaki Ki-61 fighters.) and two Gingas shot down. Nonetheless, at 17:55, eight Gingas broke through the screen from the task group's starboard and made a run towards the escort carriers. One plane, hit by anti-aircraft fire, appeared to veer for Coral Sea's flight deck, crashing 300 yd (270 m) short. Another was brought down 800 yd (730 m) from her port bow. One Ginga dropped a torpedo at Coral Sea from an estimated 1,500 to 2,500 yd (1,400 to 2,300 m) away, which missed. Alarmingly, another Ginga passed just 50 ft (15 m) above her flight deck, having prematurely dropped its bomb 30 ft (9.1 m) off her starboard beam. Under heavy fire from her anti-aircraft guns, it crashed 1,500 yd (1,400 m) off her port quarter. By 17:58, the attack was over.

At 06:13 the next morning, four dive bombers were detected on radar 26 mi (42 km) from the task group. The Japanese formation, passing in between two combat air patrols, made an attack run on the escort carriers at 06:19, just as Coral Sea was launching emergency fighters. Approaching from ahead and masked by the rising sun, one plane made for Coral Sea, releasing its bomb high and missing 100 ft (30 m) short of her bow. Two of the other planes dropped their bombs astern of Gambier Bay, while the last was driven off as it attempted to attack Corregidor. As the Japanese squadron attempted to escape, two were shot down by fighters.

Coral Sea replenished at Eniwetok on 28 June and rendezvoused on 4 July with Task Group 53.7 for the postponed landings on Guam. She arrived off Guam on 9 July, launching preparatory air strikes and softening positions. She returned to Eniwetok on 15 July to replenish, but immediately upon leaving port on 17 July, her engines gave out, and she was ordered back to anchor. The repair ship Hector assisted in fixing one of her maneuvering valves, but no replacement piston could be procured for the No. 5. cylinder in her starboard main engine. Ultimately, she was sent back to the West Coast, and set off on 23 July. She stopped at Kwajalein on 25 July to unload her embarked squadron and munitions, transiting via Pearl Harbor and arriving at San Diego on 9 August. She entered drydock on 31 August for repairs and overhaul. On 15 September, the crew of Coral Sea received word that she was renamed Anzio, becoming the first ship to be named after the Battle of Anzio. This vacated her former name for the planned Midway-class aircraft carrier USS Coral Sea (CV-42). (Note: CV-42 was later renamed Franklin D. Roosevelt on 8 May 1945, with the name ultimately passing to CV-43.)

Coral Sea's action report depicting the engagements from 17–19 June
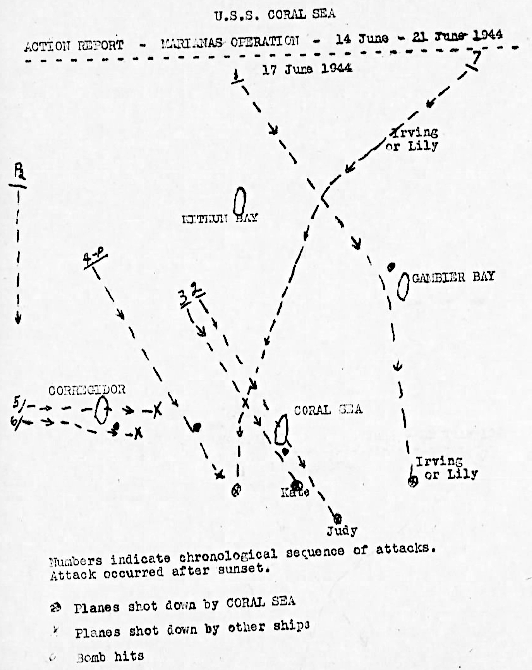
17 June

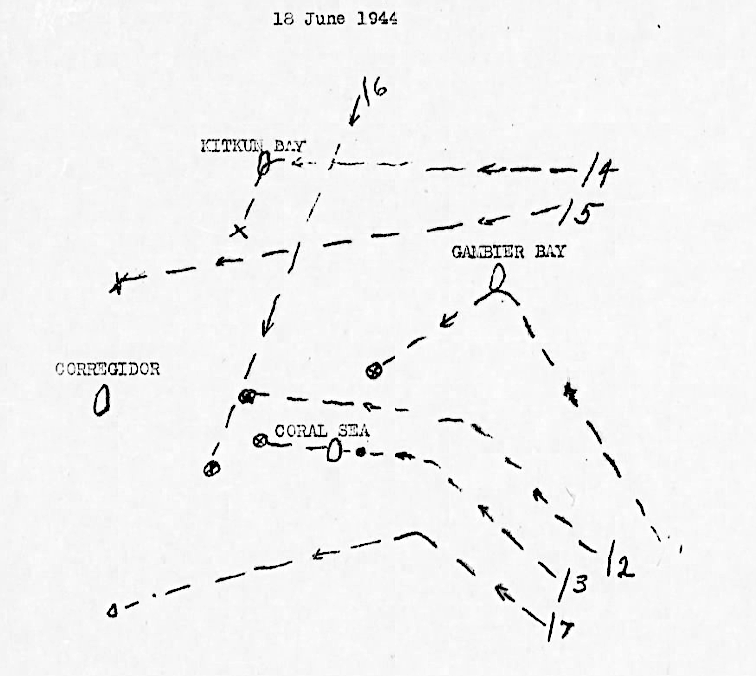
18 June

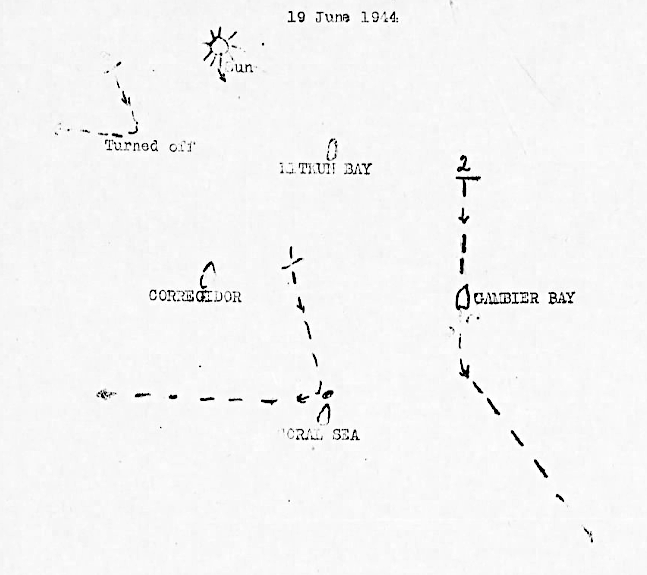
19 June

=== Philippines and Typhoon Cobra ===
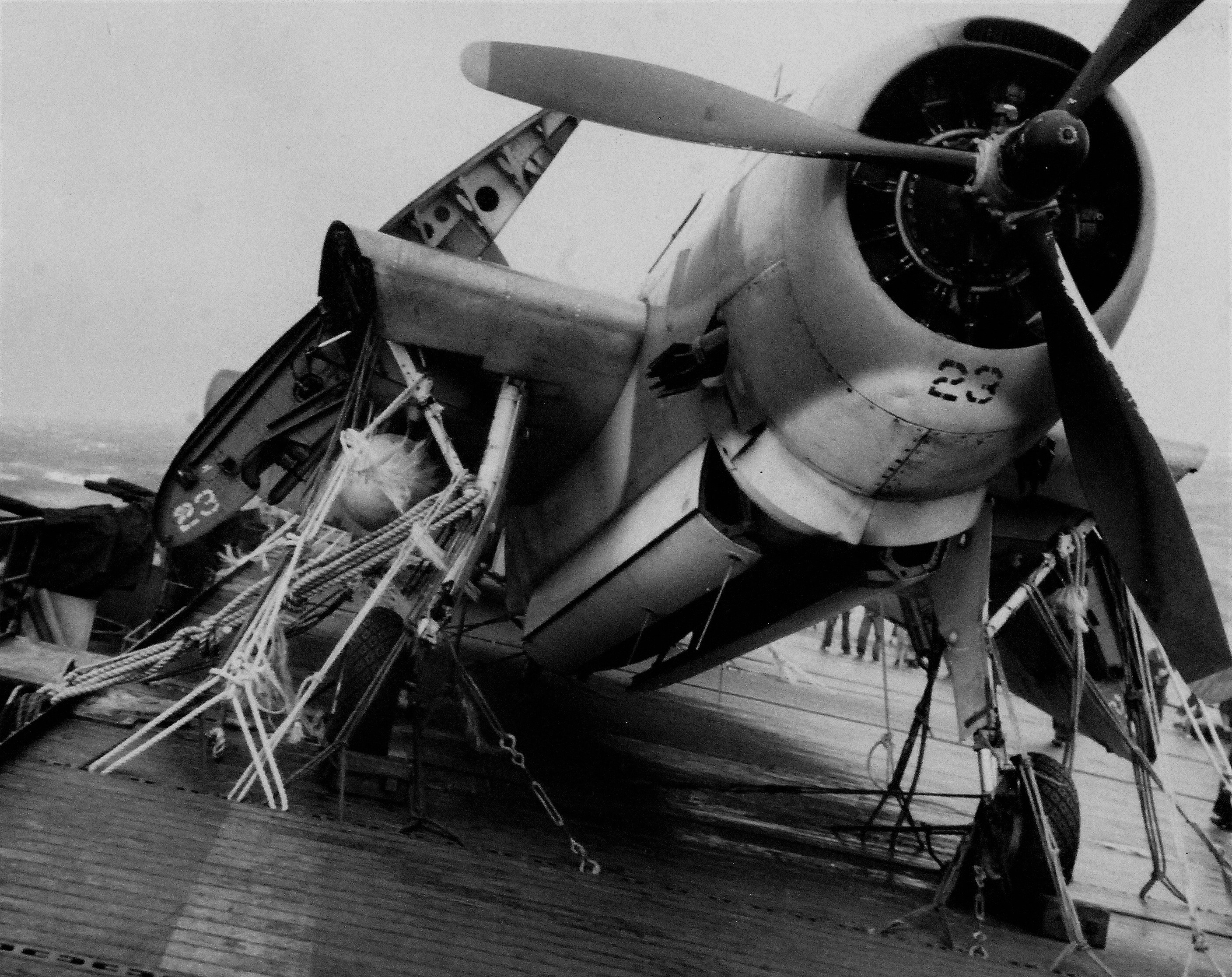
A TBM-1C Avenger tied onto the flight deck of Anzio, 18 December 1944

Anzio held sea trials off the California coast before setting off for the western Pacific on 16 September with 71 aircraft and 200 military passengers embarked. She reached Pearl Harbor on 23 September, beginning a series of anti-submarine exercises on 8 October with her freshly embarked squadron, Composite Squadron (VC) 82. She set out for Eniwetok on 16 October, where she became flagship of the hunter-killer group Task Group 30.7, which consisted of Anzio and five John C. Butler-class destroyer escorts. (Note: The accompanying destroyer escorts consisted of Lawrence C. Taylor, Melvin R. Nawman, Oliver Mitchell, Tabberer and Robert F. Keller.) She proceeded to Ulithi, which she departed on 4 November, bound for the Philippine Sea. However, her orders were countermanded while she was barely out of port, as she was directed to assist the light cruiser Reno, which had been torpedoed by the Type B2 submarine I-41. She arrived the next day and provided air cover through 8 November for the fleet tugboat Zuni, which had Reno under tow. She then linked up with Task Group 30.8, the At Sea Logistic Group, which was providing underway replenishment in the form of supplies, fuel, and replacement aircraft for the Fast Carrier Task Force as it covered the landings on Leyte. Anzio's role for the following months was to provide a screen for the logistics force and to hunt down submarines.

Anzio's aircraft operated with little result until 18 November. Ultra signals intelligence had alerted Allied command to the presence of I-41, the same ship which had torpedoed Reno, within Anzio's vicinity. In response, she was ordered to conduct a sweep over the area. At 03:29, one of her Avenger torpedo bombers made radar contact with I-41 and dropped flares, whereupon the contact was lost. A nearby Avenger was summoned to assist and together, they dropped float lights and sonobuoys near the contact, guiding Lawrence C. Taylor and Melvin R. Nawman into position. The destroyer escorts arrived at the signature and began firing their Hedgehog anti-submarine mortars. At 06:24, Lawrence C. Taylor fired her third Hedgehog barrage, which destroyed I-41 and brought debris to the surface. By the next day, a 2 mi (3.2 km) wide oil slick covered the area.

Early on 17 December, Anzio was attached to William Halsey Jr.'s Third Fleet, which was refueling and receiving replacement aircraft from the At Sea Logistic Group about 300 mi (480 km; 260 nmi) east of Luzon. Throughout the day, weather conditions deteriorated as Typhoon Cobra bore down upon the fleet. At 13:10, Halsey ordered fueling operations to be suspended, and for his fleet to proceed to 17°N 128°E, 160 mi (260 km) to the northwest. At 15:30, a new weather report was received, and Halsey moved the destination 185 mi (298 km) southwards. At 22:20, a final course correction was made, to 15.30°N 127.40°E. The net effect of these maneuvers was to direct the fleet towards a point just 40 mi (64 km) north of the typhoon's path.

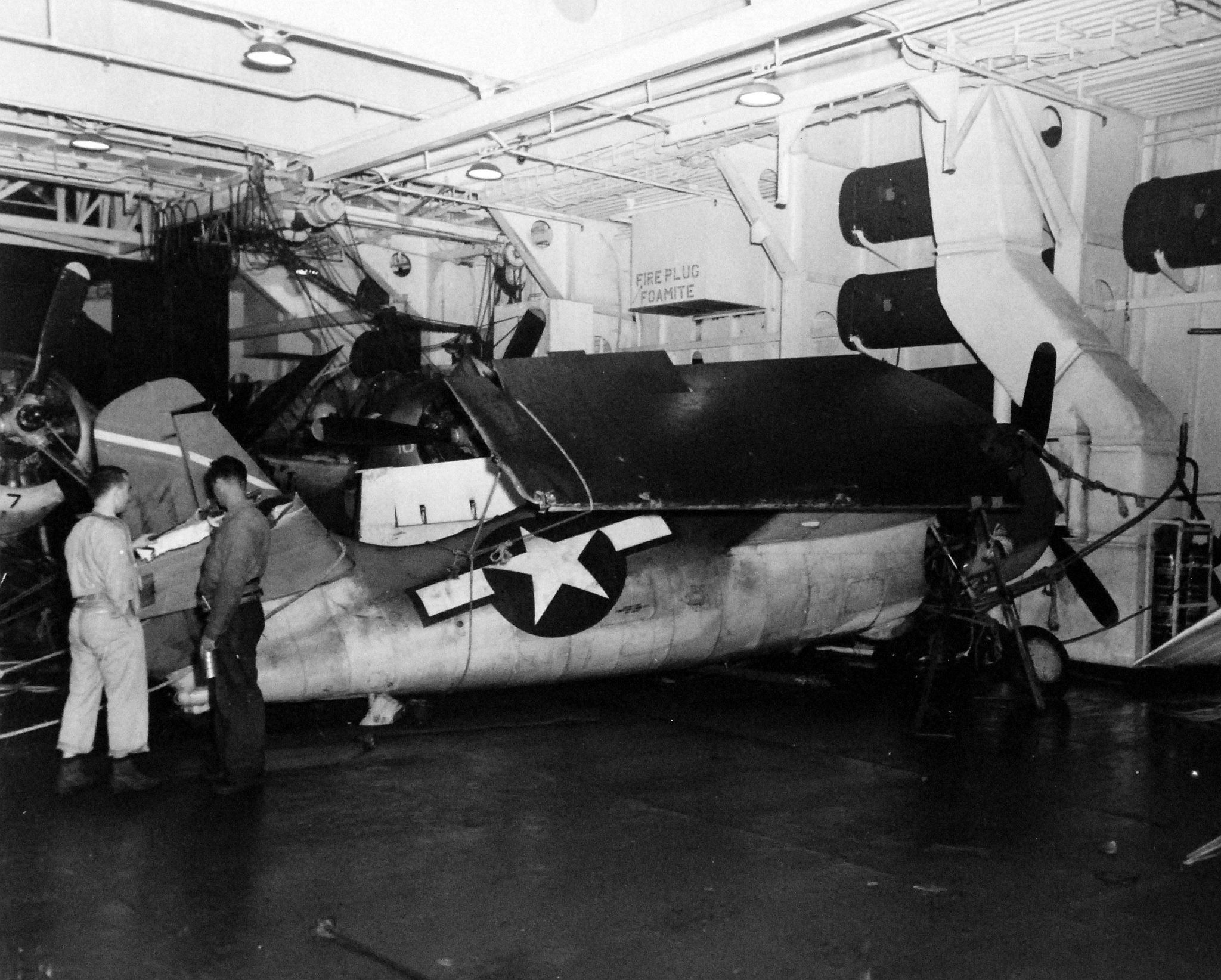
The damaged Wildcat within the hangar deck of Anzio, 18 December 1944

At the height of the storm on 18 December, Anzio's barometer recorded a reading of 28.88 inHg (978 mbar) in atmospheric pressure and encountered winds that reached an estimated 120 kn (140 mph; 62 m/s; 220 km/h). Her anemometer had recorded wind speeds of 90 kn (100 mph; 46 m/s; 170 km/h) before being blown away. She rolled up to 39°, beyond her theoretical angle of maximum righting moment of 37 1/2°. Waves crashed over her flight deck and sent water running down her port funnels. The aircraft on her flight deck had been rigorously secured, but two planes were still swept away. Similar measures were taken within the hangar deck, but a Wildcat broke free, smashing into a bulkhead. This incident incurred the lone casualty on Anzio, a broken arm suffered in the rush to resecure the loose plane. She emerged from the storm having sustained minor damage. Her fore catwalks and lookout station had been mangled, she had lost several life rafts and one of her whaleboats, and some water had made it into the interior of the ship, but she was able to remain on station. The rest of Halsey's fleet had not fared as well, with the destroyers Hull, Monaghan, and Spence all capsizing. The day after the storm, Admiral Halsey ordered Anzio and Rudyerd Bay to join three destroyers and two destroyer escorts in searching for and recovering survivors. By the time Halsey called off the search on 22 December, only 93 survivors had been rescued from the ocean, leaving 793 dead. Anzio spent January conducting sweeps off Luzon in support of the landings at Lingayen Gulf and in February 1945, she headed to support the invasion of Iwo Jima.

=== Iwo Jima ===
Anzio resumed combat operations on 16 February, conducting strikes on Iwo Jima and providing air cover for the naval forces arrayed against it. On 21 February, her crew witnessed a kamikaze sink her sister Bismarck Sea. With the loss of Bismarck Sea, Anzio's pilots assumed extra work, taxing them heavily. Some pilots logged six to seven hours of flying on seven consecutive nights, and VC-82's crew voiced complaints that they were having trouble sleeping. Nonetheless, her aircraft found success in hunting submarines. On 25 February, the Fletcher-class destroyer Bennion reported a sonar contact with a submarine. Anzio launched an Avenger to investigate the sighting, and sent out another during the predawn hours of 26 February to continue the search. At 02:20, her Avenger picked up the radar signature of the Kaichū type submarine Ro-43 3 mi (4.8 km) away. Passing over the contact, the distinctive whirl of a crash diving submarine could be discerned. At 02:25, her Avenger dropped its Mark 24 "Fido" torpedo and two sonobuoys from an altitude of 150 ft (46 m), which landed 150 yd (140 m) in front of the whirl. As dawn broke, all that remained was an oil slick.

The next day, on 27 February, another one of her Avengers detected the surfaced Type D1 kaiten carrier I-368 on its radar at 03:04. Passing over and making visual contact at 280 kn (320 mph; 520 km/h), the Avenger was unable to mount an attack, and by the time it had circled around, the submarine had dived. Anzio's Avenger dropped a float light and sonobuoys around the location, and at 03:38, a conning tower was spotted breaching the surface near the float light. A Mark 24 torpedo was dropped 100 ft (30 m) in front of the crash-diving submarine, and an explosion which sent a plume of water 30 ft (9.1 m) into the air was observed. Another Avenger from Anzio arrived, and together, they monitored the sonobuoys, over which unusual sounds could be discerned. Another Mark 24 torpedo was dropped, but no detonation was heard. However, soon afterwards, air bubbled to the surface, followed by an extensive oil slick. Anzio departed Iwo Jima on 8 March and entered San Pedro Bay on 12 March. After embarking the veteran Composite Squadron (VC) 13 from Tripoli, she sailed on 22 March to join the invasion of Okinawa.

=== Okinawa ===
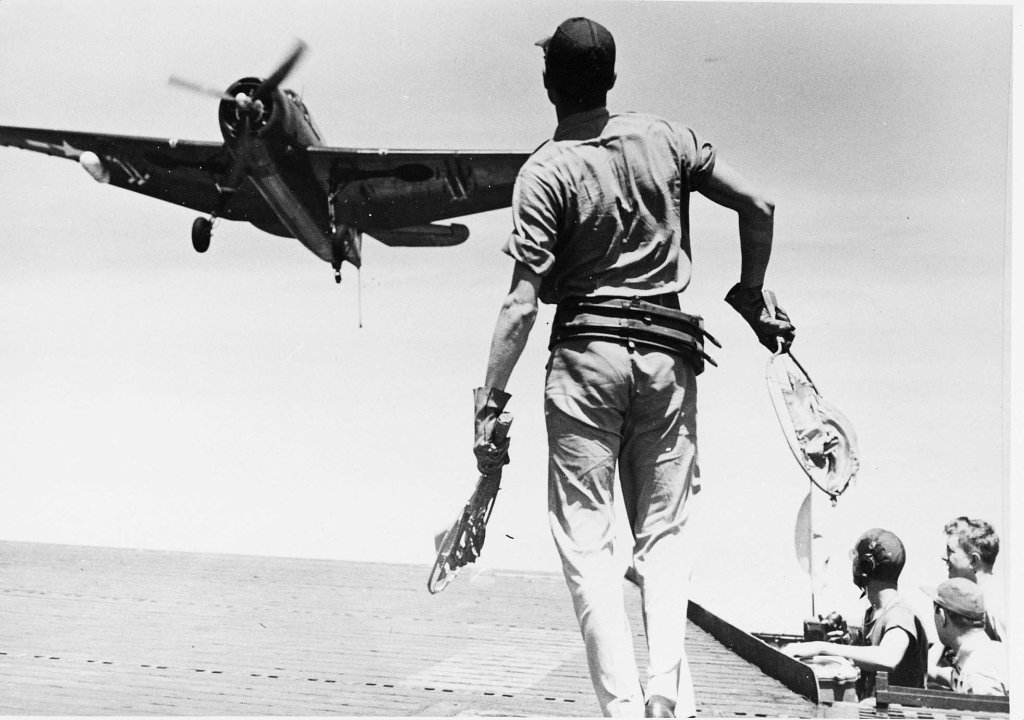
A TBM-3E Avenger lands on Anzio, 20 May 1945.

While underway, Anzio continued her patrols, screening for the landing forces. After the initial landings on 1 April, she performed both close air support and anti-submarine work. She entered Ulithi on 30 April for repairs to her rudder bearings. There, her embarked squadron had their TBM-1C Avengers replaced with TBM-3Es. These new planes had more powerful engines, were equipped with improved radars, and had wing hardpoints that could mount rockets or drop tanks. On 21 May, she resumed operations off Okinawa, and on 28 May, she received word of a submarine contact from a minesweeper. She dispatched aircraft to the vicinity, but her aircraft found no leads until early on 31 May, when one of her Avengers detected a radar signature at 04:36. Investigating the blip, the Avenger found the Type D1 kaiten carrier I-361 fully surfaced. Approaching from the port beam, the Avenger fired four 5 in (127 mm) air-to-surface rockets, two impacting around the conning tower. Turning around, the Avenger found the submarine diving, and failed to drop its Mark 24 torpedo, as its pilot had neglected to switch the armament selector from "RP" (rocket projectile) to "Bomb-Torpedo". On its second pass, the Avenger deployed its Mark 24 torpedo, along with all six sonobuoys via the emergency release. Steaming towards the contact, the destroyer escort Oliver Mitchell felt a heavy underwater shock 15 mi (24 km) away. She arrived to find a large debris field and oil slick.

On 11 June, while Anzio was taking on aviation fuel from the Cimarron-class oiler Caliente, a pair of fuel tanks inside Anzio ruptured, sending aviation fuel running into her cofferdams. Further inspections over the following days would find major leakage, forcing her to withdraw early. In the meantime, she proceeded with a planned radio deception operation that had begun that same morning. The Fast Carrier Task Force (operating as Task Force 38 under the Third Fleet) had been launching strikes on Okinawa and Kyushu but had retired for Leyte under radio silence on 10 June for replenishment. A radioman from Halsey's staff was sent over to Anzio, and from 11–17 June, when she herself headed to Leyte for repairs, radio traffic was emitted to mimic Halsey's fleet, providing the impression that it was still out at sea.

Anzio left San Pedro Bay on 6 July and reached her operating area 600 mi (970 km) east of Tokyo on 14 July. She resumed her anti-submarine work covering Task Group 30.8, which was resupplying the Fast Carrier Task Force as it conducted strikes across Japan. At 07:37 on 16 July, an Avenger from Anzio detected the broadside radar signature of the Type A Mod.2 cruiser submarine I-13 10 mi (16 km) away. The Avenger concealed itself within the clouds and ambushed the submarine: it raked I-13 with .50 Browning machine gun fire and launched two sets of two rockets, one at 600 yd (550 m) and another at 400 yd (370 m). One rocket impacted the submarine below the conning tower at the waterline, and the other three rockets hit 15 ft (4.6 m) short but still in line with the conning tower. Circling around, the Avenger dropped two depth charges (which both missed) and a sonobuoy. It also attempted to drop its Mark 24 torpedo, but as the armament selector had not been switched, the torpedo remained on the aircraft. On a second go around, the Avenger released its Mark 24 torpedo 200 ft (61 m) ahead of the wake left by the submarine. This evidently damaged I-13, as oil soon began upwelling.

Anzio's Avenger tracked the oil slick as it moved across the ocean. It was joined by another Avenger at 09:00, and by a third one at 09:20. More sonobuoys were dropped, tracking the sound of I-13's propellers. At 10:00, a Mark 24 torpedo was dropped 500 ft (150 m) in front of the slick, and an explosion followed by hissing was heard over the sonobuoys. Pieces of debris floated to the surface. Nonetheless, at 11:20, the oil slick began crawling eastwards again. By this point, the destroyer escorts Lawrence C. Taylor and Robert F. Keller were approaching the scene. A beacon was dropped at the submarine's approximate location, and Lawrence C. Taylor, guided by the beacon and her sonar, let loose a full Hedgehog barrage at 11:40 which destroyed I-13.

=== Post-war ===
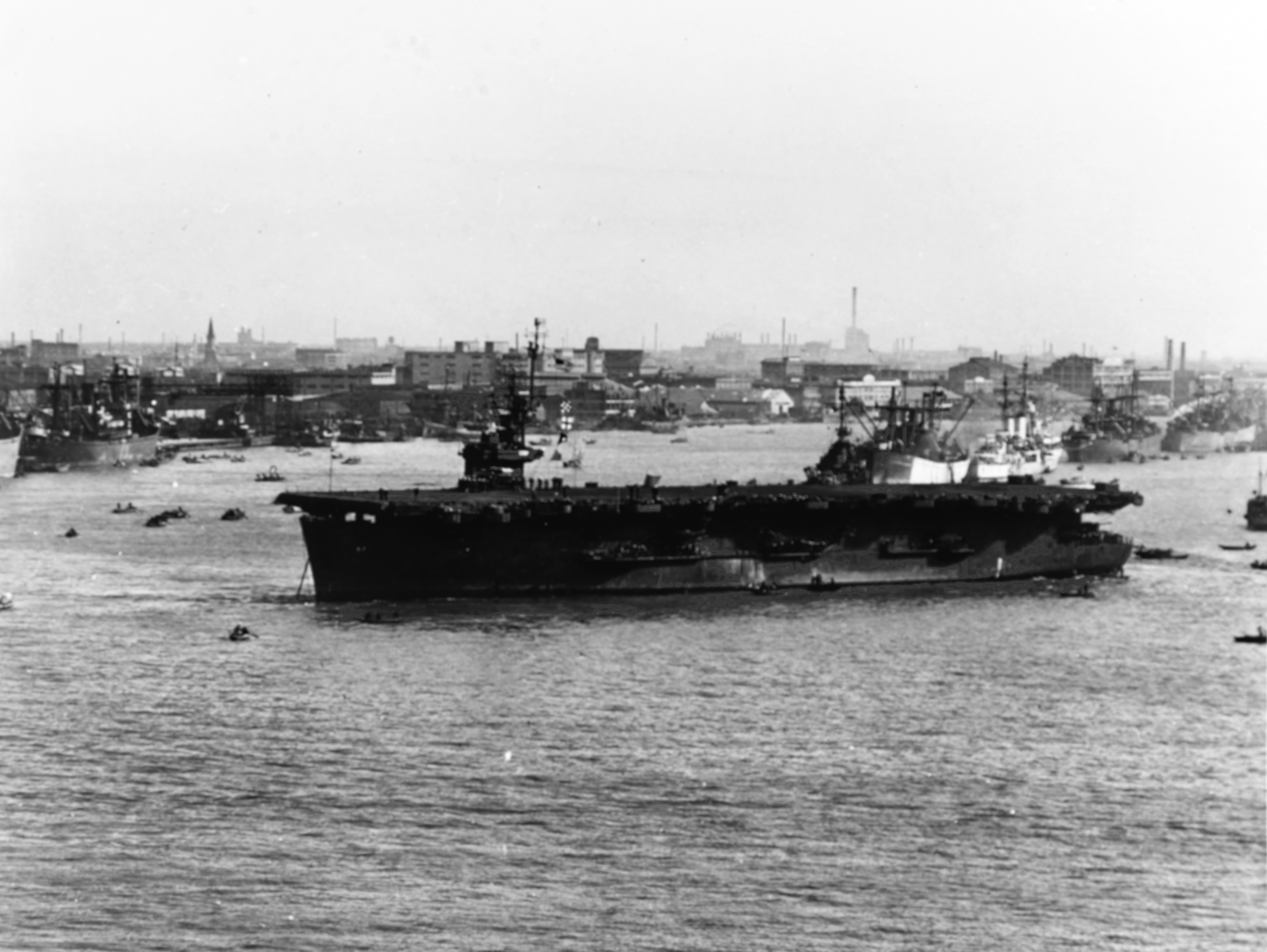
Anzio in Shanghai, 1 December 1945

Anzio continued her anti-submarine patrols with no further incident until she received word of the Japanese surrender on 15 August. She sailed for Guam on 19 August, where her air squadron was disembarked. In its place, Composite Squadron (VC) 66 came onboard, and after a refit and some refresher training for her new air complement, the escort carrier headed for Okinawa. En route, she provided air cover and conducted anti-submarine patrols for transports carrying occupation troops to Korea. On 8 September, she anchored at Incheon, where she provided air support for the landings of the occupation force. She left Korea on 13 September, returned to Okinawa, and headed for the West Coast on 19 September. She arrived at San Francisco on 30 September, where she joined the Operation Magic Carpet fleet, which repatriated U.S. personnel from around the Pacific.

At San Francisco, Anzio was modified to provide maximum passenger accommodations. She made two trips to the western Pacific, one to Pearl Harbor and one to Shanghai, where she became the first American carrier to visit the port. She arrived in Seattle on 23 December, ending the year at that port. On 18 January 1946, she sailed for Norfolk, Virginia. She paused at San Francisco and transited the Panama Canal en route to the East Coast. She was decommissioned on 5 August and mothballed, joining the Norfolk group of the Atlantic Reserve Fleet. Post-war, although all of the escort carriers found themselves ill-suited for the coming jet age, with the new generation of anti-submarine and ground-attack aircraft demanding greater deck lengths, the Casablanca-class escort carriers were in a particularly vulnerable spot. As compared to the Bogue-class escort carriers, which were fitted with a combination of diesel and steam machinery, and the Commencement Bay-class escort carriers, which were powered with standard geared turbines, the Casablanca-class escort carriers were, due to wartime exigencies, saddled with the Skinner Unaflow steam engines, which were both cumbersome and uneconomical. While some of the escort carriers found second lives during the Cold War as aviation transports and amphibious assault carriers, the majority of the Casablanca-class spent their remaining years in mothballs.

On 15 June 1955, Anzio was redesignated as a helicopter aircraft carrier, becoming CVHE-57. She was struck from the Navy list on 1 March 1959 and sold to Master Metals Co. on 24 November 1959 for scrapping. Her anchor was preserved, and is on display in front of the National Museum of the United States Navy at the Washington Navy Yard. She received nine battle stars (Note: Three awarded as Coral Sea, and six awarded as Anzio.) and a Navy Unit Commendation for her World War II service.

== Squadron history ==
Operation	Embarked Squadron	Fighters	Torpedo bombers	Total
Battle of Makin	Composite Squadron (VC) 33	12 F4F-4	10 TBF-1C	22
Battle of Kwajalein		9 F4F-4, 5 FM-1	4 TBF-1, 2 TBM-1, 6 TBF-1C	26
Western New Guinea campaign		14 FM-2	7 TBF-1, 4 TBM-1C	25
Battle of Saipan		14 FM-2	2 TBF-1, 6 TBF-1C, 4 TBM-1C	26
Philippines campaign	Composite Squadron (VC) 82	11 FM-2	16 TBM-1C	27
Battle of Iwo Jima		12 FM-2	14 TBM-1C	26
Battle of Okinawa	Composite Squadron (VC) 13	12 FM-2	14 TBM-1C (Note: Anzio's TBM-1Cs were exchanged for TBM-3Es in early May 1945.)	26

== Sources ==
=== Online sources ===
- "Alikula Bay", Geographic Names Information System, United States Geological Survey, United States Department of the Interior
- "Anzio I (CVE-57)". Dictionary of American Naval Fighting Ships. Naval History and Heritage Command. 7 April 2020.
- "Coral Sea (CVB-43)". Dictionary of American Naval Fighting Ships. Naval History and Heritage Command. 27 April 2016.
- "Cost of War-Built Vessels From Inception, From October 25, 1936 to June 30, 1946" (PDF). United States Maritime Commission. Archived from the original (PDF) on 18 February 2026.
- Evans, Mark L. (16 June 2023). "Anzio II (CG-68)". Dictionary of American Naval Fighting Ships. Naval History and Heritage Command.
- Evans, Mark L. (11 August 2020). "Franklin D. Roosevelt (CVB-42)". Dictionary of American Naval Fighting Ships. Naval History and Heritage Command.
- Evans, Robert L.; Palmer, Fitzhugh L. (August 1976). "'Pictorial—Cinderella Carriers'". Proceedings. 102 (8).
- Hackett, Bob; Kingsepp, Sander (2017). "Tabular history of I-41". combinedfleet.com.
- Hackett, Bob; Kingsepp, Sander (2017). "Tabular history of I-361". combinedfleet.com.
- Hackett, Bob; Kingsepp, Sander (2020). "Tabular history of RO-43". combinedfleet.com.
- "National Museum of the US Navy – Anchors". Naval History And Heritage Command.
- "Operation Galvanic—Tarawa and Makin Islands, November 1943". Naval History And Heritage Command. 7 December 2021.

=== Books ===
- Adcock, Al (1996), Escort Carriers in Action – Warships No. 9, Carrollton, Texas: Squadron/Signal Publications, ISBN 0897473566
- Decorations, Medals, Ribbons, Badges of the United States Navy, Marine Corps and Coast Guard 1861–1948, NAVPERS 15790, Washington, D.C.: Bureau of Naval Personnel, 1948, OCLC 2504188
- Drury, Bob; Clavin, Thomas (2007), Halsey's Typhoon: The True Story of a Fighting Admiral, an Epic Storm, and an Untold Rescue, New York City, New York: Grove Press, ISBN 9780802143372
- Friedman, Norman (1980), "United States of America", in Chesneau, Roger; Gardiner, Robert (eds.), Conway's All the World's Fighting Ships 1922–1946, London, England: Conway Maritime Press, ISBN 0870219138
- Friedman, Norman (1983), U.S. Aircraft Carriers: An Illustrated Design History, Annapolis, Maryland: Naval Institute Press, ISBN 0870217399
- Hornfischer, James D. (2016), The Fleet at Flood Tide: America at Total War in the Pacific, 1944-1945, New York City, New York: Bantam Books, ISBN 9780345548702
- Morison, Samuel E. (1953), New Guinea and the Marianas, March 1944 – August 1944, History of United States Naval Operations in World War II, vol. VIII, Boston, Massachusetts: Little & Brown, LCCN 47-1571, OCLC 1035611842, OL 24388559M
- Noles, James L. (2010), Twenty-Three Minutes to Eternity: The Final Voyage of the Escort Carrier USS Liscome Bay, Tuscaloosa, Alabama: University of Alabama Press, ISBN 9780817356033
- Ross, Al (1993), The Escort Carrier Gambier Bay, Anatomy of the Ship, London, England: Conway Maritime Press, ISBN 1557502358
- Tillman, Barrett (2006), Clash of the Carriers: The True Story of the Marianas Turkey Shoot of World War II, London, England: Penguin Books, ISBN 0451219562
- Y'Blood, William T. (2012), Red Sun Setting: The Battle of the Philippine Sea, Annapolis, Maryland: Naval Institute Press, ISBN 9781591149941
- Y'Blood, William T. (2012), The Little Giants: U.S. Escort Carriers Against Japan, Annapolis, Maryland: Naval Institute Press, ISBN 9781612512471

=== Military documents ===
- "Act Rep of Ops During Assault & Occupation of Saipan Is, Marianas, 6/14-21/44". United States Navy – via Fold3.
- "War Diary, COMCARDIV 24, February 1944". United States Navy – via Fold3.
- "War Diary, USS Anzio, June 1945". United States Navy – via Fold3.
- "War Diary, USS Coral Sea, June 1944". United States Navy – via Fold3.
- "War Diary, USS Coral Sea, July 1944". United States Navy – via Fold3.
- "War Diary, USS Melvin R. Nawman, November 1944". United States Navy – via Fold3.
- "War History, Coral Sea, 8/27/43 to 10/10/44 Anzio History, 10/10/44 to 9/30/45". United States Navy. 21 November 1945 – via Fold3.
