= USS Melvin R. Nawman =

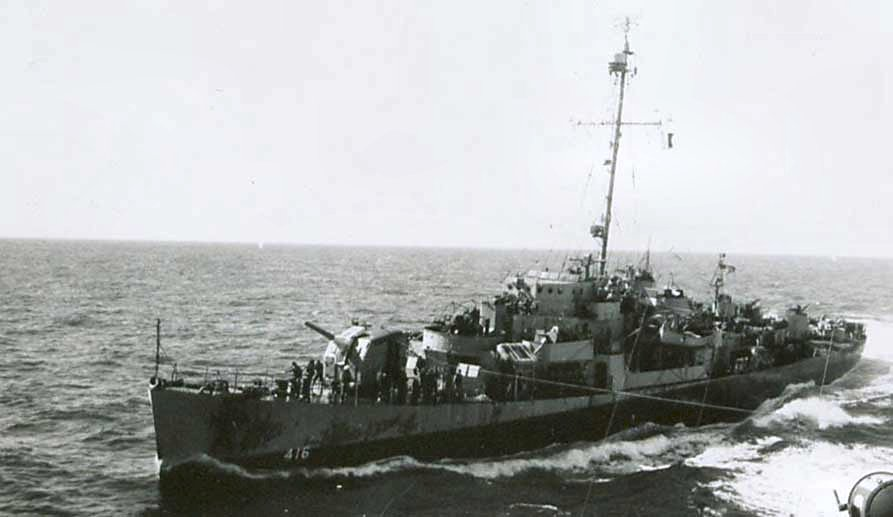
- Melvin R. Nawman underway, c. 1944

History

United States
- Name: Melvin R. Nawman
- Laid down: 3 January 1944
- Launched: 7 February 1944
- Commissioned: 16 May 1944
- Decommissioned: 24 April 1946
- In service: 28 March 1951; assigned 1st Naval District, June 1958
- Out of service: 30 August 1960
- Stricken: 1 July 1972
- Identification: DE-416
- Fate: Sold for scrapping 3 October 1973

General characteristics
- Class & type: John C. Butler-class destroyer escort
- Displacement: 1,350 long tons (1,372 t)
- Length: 306 ft (93 m) (oa)
- Beam: 36 ft 10 in (11.23 m)
- Draft: 13 ft 4 in (4.06 m) (max)
- Propulsion: 2 boilers, 2 geared steam turbines, 12,000 shp (8,900 kW), 2 screws
- Speed: 24 knots (44 km/h; 28 mph)
- Range: 6,000 nmi (11,000 km; 6,900 mi) at 12 kn (22 km/h; 14 mph)
- Complement: 14 officers, 201 enlisted
- Armament: 2 × 5"/38 caliber guns; 2 × twin 40 mm AA guns; 10 × 20 mm AA cannons; 3 × 21-inch (533 mm) torpedo tubes; 1 Hedgehog ASW mortar; 8 depth charge throwers, 2 depth charge tracks

USS Melvin R. Nawman (DE-416) was a John C. Butler-class destroyer escort in service with the United States Navy from 1944 to 1946. She was recommissioned from 1951 to 1960 and finally sold for scrap in 1973.

== History ==
The destroyer escort was named in honor of Melvin Rollie Nawman, Born 10 September in Aurora, Illinois, who died attempting to stop the "Tokyo Express" from landing additional reinforcements on Guadalcanal. The gallantry of this volunteer mission was recognized through a posthumously awarded Air Medal.

Melvin R. Nawman's keel was laid down on 3 January 1944 by Brown Shipbuilding Co. at their yard in Houston, Texas. The destroyer escort was launched on 16 February 1944, sponsored by Mrs. R. B. Nawman, mother of the late 2d Lt. Melvin R. Nawman and commissioned on 16 May 1944.

=== World War II ===
Following completion of shakedown exercises off Bermuda Melvin R. Nawman steamed forth from Boston Navy Yard on 22 July 1944 for the Pacific theater. A two-month training period with an antisubmarine hunter-killer group interrupted her westward progress at Pearl Harbor. In October convoy missions commenced to Eniwetok, Marshall Islands, and Ulithi, western Caroline group highlighted by a submarine contact on 18 November and an encounter with a severe tropical storm a month later.

The year 1945 brought action off the invasion beaches with the U.S. 5th Fleet. Melvin R. Nawman screened the escort carrier USS Anzio as its planes bombed Japanese positions on Iwo Jima on 16 February (D day minus 3) until 3 March. With victory imminent the group retired to Leyte for redeployment off the beaches of Okinawa. In the intense action that followed the destroyer escort's guns shot down their first two planes near Kerama Retto on 2 April earning the Bronze Star Medal for two members of the crew. After a month on station the ship returned to escort duty centered around Guam. In the final stages of the war in the Pacific 47 consecutive days were spent at sea screening aircraft carrier task forces operating off the east coast of Japan before retiring to Guam.

In the next four months Melvin R. Nawman steamed first to Korea and then made three escort trips to the China coast as the United States and Nationalist China tried to redistribute their forces to stabilize the postwar Far East. On 22 December, pressed into "Operation Magic Carpet" duty, the destroyer escort pointed its bow toward home. She arrived at San Francisco, California on 15 January 1946 and on 23 April decommissioned at San Diego, California, and joined the Pacific Reserve Fleet.

=== Korean War ===
The expansion of the U.S. Armed Forces during the Korean War restored Melvin R. Nawman to a commissioned status on 28 March 1951. Following shakedown she departed San Diego on 22 June to assume new duties with Destroyer Force, Atlantic Fleet, arriving at Melville, Rhode Island on 11 July.

=== Training assignments ===
Beside local operations Melvin R. Nawman made voyages each year to Key West, Florida, and commencing in 1954 annual visits to Caribbean island ports. These areas provided the most intensive antisubmarine warfare training and at times permitted this destroyer escort to assist in the training of students from the Fleet Sonar School, Key West. Three midshipmen cruises also brought visits to Norway, Denmark, and Quebec, Canada. Her busiest sailing year 1957, climaxed in October with a 49-day voyage which traversed the length of the Mediterranean Sea.

The next year assigned to a Reserve Escort Squadron she undertook her first Naval Reserve cruise 16 June. Emerging from overhaul in February 1959 she was designated a Selected Reserve Training Ship berthed first at Davisville, Rhode Island, and after 12 December at Providence, Rhode Island. Her Reserve crew completed one cruise to Puerto Rico in the spring of 1960 but on her last voyage Melvin R. Nawman was towed into the New York Navy Yard on 1 June for inactivation.

== Fate ==
She decommissioned 30 August 1960 and struck 1 July 1972 from the Navy List. She was sold for scrap on 3 October 1973 and broken up.

== Awards ==
Melvin R. Nawman received four battle stars for service in the Pacific theater during World War II.
