= Bob Drury =

American writer and journalist

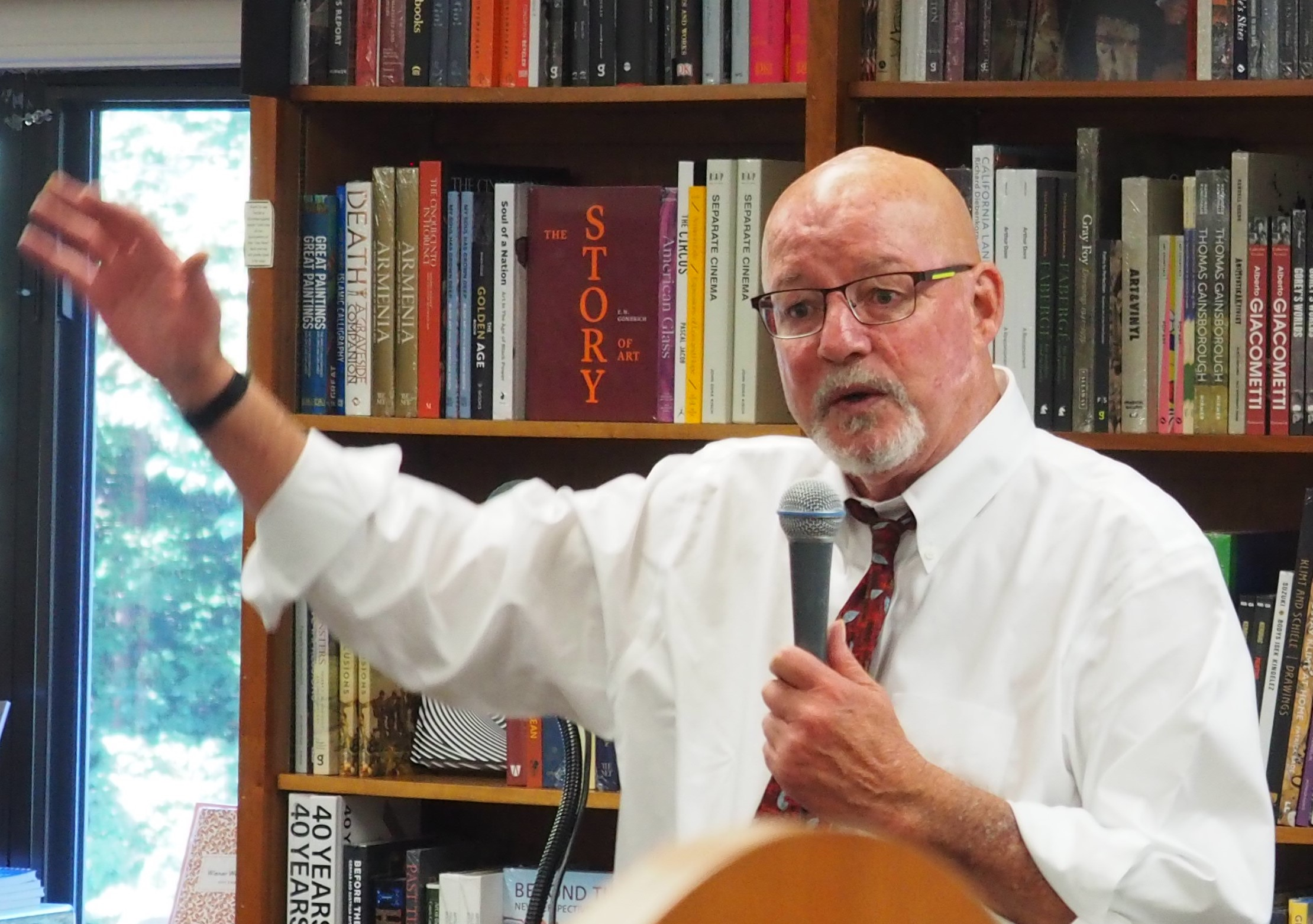
- Education: Fairfield University
- Occupation: Writer
- Writing career
- Language: English
- Website: rfxdrury.com/books.html

Bob Drury is an American writer and journalist. He has contributed to a variety of newspapers, magazines, and other publications. He is the author of over twelve non-fiction books. Currently, he resides in Manasquan, New Jersey.

== Early life and education ==
Drury went to high school in Newark, New Jersey. He attended Fairfield University in Connecticut and majored in English. After school, Drury moved to Cape Cod. He held an assortment of jobs, which included working on a painting crew and on a commercial fishing pier.

== Career ==
Drury began his writing career after hearing about a publication opportunity while playing for the Cape Cod Basketball League. For his first story published in the Cape Cod Standard Times, he earned $20. Drury continued writing for this local newspaper, covering town council meetings.

Later he moved to Harrison, New Jersey, where continued to work for various newspapers and magazines. Drury interviewed comedian Richard Belzer. Around this time, he also had a job as a film can carrier.

Drury wrote for the sports column at New York Post. He started out by covering sports games no one else wanted, but that eventually led to bigger sporting events with the New York Giants, New York Jets, and New York Knicks. Drury was eventually made a columnist at the Post.

Mike McAlary, Drury's close friend and former Post contributor, urged Drury to leave the Post, as he did. Drury eventually took his advice and joined Sports Magazine and worked on freelance crime stories for Daily News. Around the late 1980s, he was hired by Newsday, the same newspaper McAlary wrote for.

Drury has been the author, co-author, or editor on nonfiction books. A few of his subjects include the National Football League and the Cosa Nostra. One of his books, The Rescue Season was turned into a documentary by the History Channel.

He has written for many publications including, The New York Times, Vanity Fair, Men's Journal, and GQ. Presently he is a contributing editor and foreign correspondent for Men's Health.

Throughout his writing career, Drury has reported from Iraq, Darfur, Afghanistan, Liberia, Belfast, Haiti, and Sarajevo.

== Published work ==
=== Books ===
- Fatso: Football When Men Were Really Men (1987) (with Arthur J. Jr. Donovan) ISBN 9780380706297
- Incident at Howard Beach: The Case for Murder (1990) (with Charles J. Hynes) ISBN 9780399135002
- Mafia Cop: The Story of an Honest Cop Whose Family was the Mob (Lou Eppolito) (1992) ISBN 9780671711375
- The Rescue Season: The Heroic Story of Parajumpers on the Edge of the World (2001) ISBN 9780684864792
- Halsey's Typhoon: The True Story of a Fighting Admiral, an Epic Storm, and an Untold Rescue (2006) (with Tom Clavin) ISBN 9780802143372
- The Last Stand of Fox Company: A True Story of U.S. Marines in Combat (2009) (with Tom Clavin) ISBN 9780802144515
- Last Men Out: The True Story of America's Heroic Final Hours in Vietnam (2011) (with Tom Clavin) ISBN 9781452650975
- The Heart of Everything That Is: The Untold Story of Red Cloud, An American Legend (2013) (with Tom Clavin) ISBN 9781451654660
- War, Sports...and Butterflies: The Greatest Hits of Bob Drury (2014) (with James Morganelli & Tom Clavin) ISBN 1503253627
- A Dog's Gift: The Inspirational Story of Veterans and Children Healed by Man's Best Friend (2015) ISBN 162336101X
- Lucky 666: The Impossible Mission (with Tom Clavin) (2016) ISBN 1476774854
- Valley Forge (with Tom Clavin) (2018) ISBN 9781501152719
- Blood and Treasure: Daniel Boone and the Fight for America's First Frontier (with Tom Clavin) (2021) ISBN 9781250247131
- The Last Hill: The Epic Story of a Ranger Battalion and the Battle That Defined WWII (with Tom Clavin) (2022) ISBN 9781250247162
