= USS Lawrence C. Taylor =

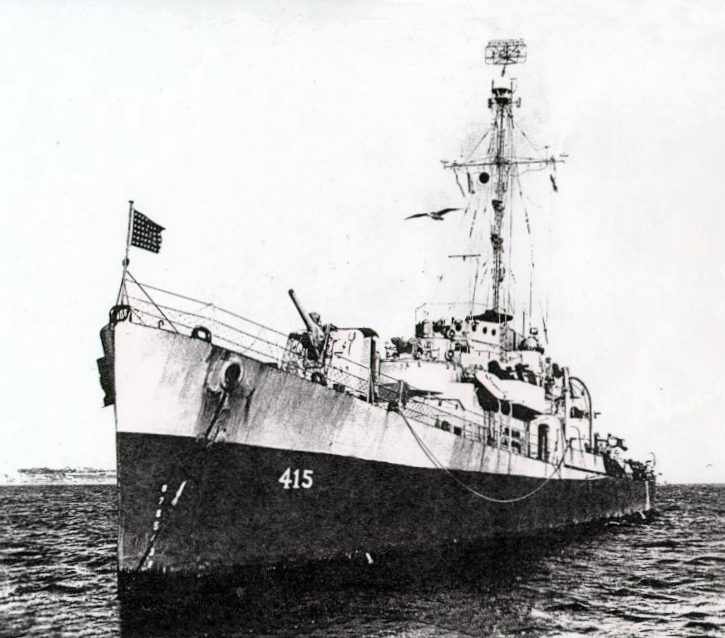
- USS Lawrence C. Taylor at anchor, c. 1945

History

United States
- Name: Lawrence C. Taylor
- Laid down: 20 December 1943
- Launched: 29 January 1944
- Commissioned: 13 May 1944
- Decommissioned: 23 April 1946
- Stricken: 1 December 1972
- Fate: Sold for scrapping 12 September 1973

General characteristics
- Class & type: John C. Butler-class destroyer escort
- Displacement: 1,350 long tons (1,372 t)
- Length: 306 ft (93 m) (oa)
- Beam: 36 ft 10 in (11.23 m)
- Draft: 13 ft 4 in (4.06 m) (max)
- Propulsion: 2 boilers, 2 geared steam turbines, 12,000 shp (8,900 kW), 2 screws
- Speed: 24 knots (44 km/h; 28 mph)
- Range: 6,000 nmi (11,000 km; 6,900 mi) at 12 kn (22 km/h; 14 mph)
- Complement: 14 officers, 201 enlisted
- Armament: 2 × 5"/38 caliber guns; 2 × twin 40 mm AA guns; 10 × 20 mm AA cannons; 3 × 21-inch (533 mm) torpedo tubes; 1 × Hedgehog ASW mortar; 8 depth charge throwers, 2 depth charge tracks

USS Lawrence C. Taylor (DE-415) was a John C. Butler-class destroyer escort in service with the United States Navy from 1944 to 1946. She was scrapped in 1973.

== Namesake ==
Lawrence Coburn Taylor was born on 12 May 1920 at Santa Ana, California. He enlisted in the Marine Corps Reserve on 14 January 1941. He was commissioned 2d lieutenant on 24 March 1941, and after flight training served in the Pacific.

He was killed in combat on 24 August 1942 during the Solomon Islands campaign in the summer of 1942 while serving with Marine Fighting Squadron 212 (VMF-212). His Grumman F4F-4 Wildcat (Bureau Number 02084) took off from Henderson Field on Guadalcanal at 14:15 to intercept six Nakajima B5N torpedo bombers that had been launched from the Japanese aircraft carrier Ryūjō. These were escorted by nine Mitsubishi A6M2 Zeros. When his aircraft failed to return, he was officially listed as Missing In Action (MIA). He was posthumously awarded the Silver Star.

== History ==
The destroyer escort's keel was laid down on 20 December 1943 by Brown Shipbuilding Co. at their yard in Houston, Texas. Lawrence C. Taylor was launched on 29 January 1944, sponsored by Mrs. Lawrence H. Taylor, mother of Lt. Taylor and commissioned on 13 May 1944.

=== World War II ===
After shakedown, Lawrence C. Taylor departed New York on 6 August 1944 for the central Pacific, arriving at Pearl Harbor on 29 August. Sailing on 16 October, the destroyer escort joined USS Anzio and her hunter-killer group in the Philippine Sea.

During operations near Leyte, her ASW patrols were rewarded 18 November after a 14-hour search for a Japanese submarine. Joining two planes from Anzio in a coordinated attack, Lawrence C. Taylor sank I-41.

During December the hunter-killer group searched the seas off Leyte and Luzon relentlessly, despite a violent typhoon which struck the islands. She was the only ship in her unit to remain on course and undamaged during the massive storm. On 3 January 1945 Lawrence C. Taylor sortied with ships of the U.S. 3rd Fleet to support the landings in Lingayen Gulf on 9 January. Remaining on patrol, she searched for enemy submarines off Luzon and prevented their closing the shipping lanes to the island.

When Iwo Jima, needed as a stopover base for B-29s, was selected as the next target on the road to Tokyo, the destroyer escort departed Saipan on 12 February to join the fight. She arrived off the tiny volcanic island on 16 February and for three days guarded a group of escort carriers as they softened up the island prior to the landings. After the Marines landed on 19 February, Lawrence C. Taylor stood by on patrol and support duty. Two days after the initial landings, she assisted the escort carrier USS Bismarck Sea after the ship was hit by a kamikaze. Her captain made the decision to remain in the area even throughout the night, leaving the search lights on and rescuing survivors, in danger of further attacks. Under the constant threat of air raids, Lawrence C. Taylor continued operations off Iwo Jima until early March.

The victory at Iwo Jima set the stage for the next campaign, Okinawa. Arriving off Okinawa on 26 March, she performed ASW sweeps prior to the Easter Sunday assault. Once again her task was to keep the shipping lanes free of enemy submarines, and she continued this duty through June.

Then Lawrence C. Taylor accompanied Admiral John S. McCain's Fast Carrier Task Force as it attacked the Japanese mainland. The submarine patrol brought results, because Anzio' planes sighted an enemy submarine on the night of 15 July. At 1140 the following morning the destroyer escort registered her second kill when her depth charge attack sank I-13.

Lawrence C. Taylor continued operations with the 3rd Fleet until the Japanese surrendered, then departed Okinawa on 5 September to join the U.S. 7th Fleet as it landed occupation troops in Korea and China. She remained with the occupation units until 26 December when she departed Okinawa for home.

== Fate ==
Arriving San Francisco, California on 15 January 1946, Lawrence C. Taylor remained on the west coast and decommissioned at San Diego, California, 23 April. She joined the Pacific Reserve Fleet and was struck from the Navy List on 1 December 1972. She was sold for scrap on 12 September 1973 and broken up.

== Awards ==
Lawrence C. Taylor received seven battle stars for World War II service.

Combat Action Ribbon (retroactive) – American Campaign Medal - Asiatic-Pacific Campaign Medal w/ 7 stars — World War II Victory Medal — Philippine Liberation Medal
