= List of ships of World War II (V) =

The List of ships of the Second World War contains major military vessels of the war, arranged alphabetically and by type. The list includes armed vessels that served during the war and in the immediate aftermath, inclusive of localized ongoing combat operations, garrison surrenders, post-surrender occupation, colony re-occupation, troop and prisoner repatriation, to the end of 1945. For smaller vessels, see also list of World War II ships of less than 1000 tons. Some uncompleted Axis ships are included, out of historic interest. Ships are designated to the country under which they operated for the longest period of the Second World War, regardless of where they were built or previous service history. Submarines show submerged displacement.

Click on headers to sort column alphabetically.

List of ships of World War II (V)
Ship	Country or organization	Class	Type	Displacement (tons)	First commissioned	Fate
V7	Romanian Naval Forces	V7	river gunboat		1943	Built at the Galați shipyard in Romania in 1943, armed with one 37 mm AA cannon and four machine guns, to Soviet Union September 1944
V8	Romanian Naval Forces	V7	river gunboat		1943	Built at the Galați shipyard in Romania in 1943, armed with one 37 mm AA cannon and four machine guns, fate unknown
V12	Romanian Naval Forces	Project 1125	river gunboat		1943	Damaged captured Soviet warship, rebuilt at the Galați shipyard in Romania in 1943, armed with one 76 mm gun in a standard T-34 turret and up to 5 machine guns, to Soviet Union September 1944
Väinämöinen	Finnish Navy	Väinämöinen	coastal defence ship	3,900	29 April 1932	To Soviet Union 29 May 1947, scrapped 1968
Valiant	Royal Navy	Queen Elizabeth	battleship	31,000	13 January 1916	Scrapped 1950
Valleyfield	Royal Canadian Navy	River	frigate	1,445	7 December 1943	Paid off 7 May 1944
Van Galen (I)	Royal Netherlands Navy	Admiralen	destroyer	1,680	20 February 1929	Sunk 10 May 1940
Van Galen (II)	Royal Netherlands Navy	N	destroyer	1,801	20 February 1942	Struck October 1956
Van Ghent	Royal Netherlands Navy	Admiralen	destroyer	1,680	31 May 1928	Ran aground and was scuttled 15 February 1942
Van Kinsbergen	Royal Netherlands Navy	Van Kinsbergen	sloop	1,760	24 August 1939	Decommissioned 29 May 1959, sold for scrap 19 February 1974
Van Nes	Royal Netherlands Navy	Admiralen	destroyer	1,337	12 March 1931	Sunk 17 February 1942
Vancouver	Royal Canadian Navy	Flower	corvette	925	20 March 1942	Paid off 26 June 1945
Vântul	Romanian Naval Forces	Vedenia	motor torpedo boat	30	1943	
Vardar	Royal Yugoslav Navy	Sava	river monitor	580	15 April 1920	Scuttled 11 April 1941
Vârtejul	Romanian Naval Forces	Vedenia	motor torpedo boat	30	1944	
Vasilefs Georgios	Hellenic Navy; Kriegsmarine	G	destroyer	1,350	15 February 1939	Captured, became ZG3 Hermes (Germany) 21 March 1942, scuttled 7 May 1943
Vasilissa Olga	Hellenic Navy	G	destroyer	1,350	February 1939	Sunk 26 September 1943
Vedenia	Romanian Naval Forces	Vedenia	motor torpedo boat	30	1943	
Veinticinco de Mayo	Argentine Navy	Veinticinco de Mayo	heavy cruiser	6,800	18 July 1931	Scrapped 1962
Vella Gulf	United States Navy	Commencement Bay	escort carrier	10,900	9 April 1945	Scrapped 1971
Venerable	Royal Navy	Colossus	aircraft carrier	13,200	17 January 1945	Paid off April 1947
Vengeance	Royal Navy	Colossus	aircraft carrier	13,200	15 January 1945	Paid off 1952
Venus	Royal Navy	V	destroyer	1,710	28 August 1943	Scrapped 1972
Verbena	Royal Navy	Flower	corvette	925	19 December 1940	
Veronica	Royal Navy; United States Navy	Flower	corvette	925	18 February 1941	To USA as Temptress 16 February 1942, to UK 26 August 1945
Verulam	Royal Navy	V	destroyer	1,710	10 December 1943	Scrapped 1972
Vervain	Royal Navy	Flower	corvette	925	9 June 1941	20 February 1945
Vetch	Royal Navy	Flower	corvette	925	11 August 1941	
Vicksburg	United States Navy	Cleveland	light cruiser	11,800	12 June 1944	Scrapped 1964
Victoriaville	Royal Canadian Navy	River	frigate	1,445	11 November 1944	Paid off 31 December 1973
Victorious	Royal Navy	Illustrious	aircraft carrier	23,000	29 May 1941	Scrapped 1969
Videla	Chilean Navy	Serrano	destroyer	1,090		Discarded 1960
Viforul	Romanian Naval Forces	Vosper	motor torpedo boat	32	1940	Built by Vosper for Romania in 1940, sunk by Soviet mines in November 1941
Viforul	Romanian Naval Forces	Vedenia	motor torpedo boat	30	1944	
Vigilant	Royal Navy	V	destroyer	1,710	22 December 1942	Paid off 1963, Scrapped 6 June 1965
Vijelia	Romanian Naval Forces	Vosper	motor torpedo boat	32	1940	Built by Vosper for Romania in 1940, sunk by Soviet mines in November 1941
Vijelia	Romanian Naval Forces	Vedenia	motor torpedo boat	30	1943	
Ville de Quebec	Royal Canadian Navy	Flower	corvette	925	24 May 1942	Paid off 6 July 1945
Vincennes (CA-44)	United States Navy	New Orleans	heavy cruiser	9,400	24 February 1937	Sunk 9 August 1942
Vincennes (CL-64)	United States Navy	Cleveland	light cruiser	11,800	21 January 1944	Sunk as target 1966
Vindex	Royal Navy	Nairana	escort carrier	13,671	3 December 1943	Paid off 1947, scrapped August 1971
Vindictive	Royal Navy	Hawkins	repair ship	9,394	1 October 1918	Former seaplane carrier and cruiser, paid off 8 September 1945
Violet	Royal Navy	Flower	corvette	925	3 February 1941	10 February 1946
Virago	Royal Navy	V	destroyer	1,710	5 November 1943	Scrapped 1965
Viscolul	Romanian Naval Forces	Vosper	motor torpedo boat	32	1940	Built by Vosper for Romania in 1940, to Soviet Union September 1944
Vittorio Veneto	Regia Marina	Littorio	battleship	41,000	28 April 1940	Scrapped 1948
Voroshilov	Soviet Navy	Kirov	heavy cruiser	7,880	20 June 1940	Scrapped 1960s
Volage	Royal Navy	V	destroyer	1,710	26 May 1944	Scrapped 1977
Vulcanul	Romanian Naval Forces	Vedenia	motor torpedo boat	30	1944	
