= HDMS Iver Huitfeldt =

A number of vessels of the Royal Danish Navy have borne the name Iver Huitfeldt or Iver Hvitfeldt, after Iver Huitfeldt.

- HDMS Iver Hvitfeldt (1886), an ironclad in service 1887–1919.
- HDMS Huitfeldt (1943), a Najaden-class torpedo boat, in service 1947–1966.
- HDMS Huitfeldt (P543), a Willemoes-class missile boat , in service 1978–2000.
- HDMS Iver Huitfeldt (F361), a Iver Huitfeldt-class frigate , in service since 2011.
