= List of ships of World War II (N) =

The List of ships of the Second World War contains major military vessels of the war, arranged alphabetically and by type. The list includes armed vessels that served during the war and in the immediate aftermath, inclusive of localized ongoing combat operations, garrison surrenders, post-surrender occupation, colony re-occupation, troop and prisoner repatriation, to the end of 1945. For smaller vessels, see also list of World War II ships of less than 1000 tons. Some uncompleted Axis ships are included, out of historic interest. Ships are designated to the country under which they operated for the longest period of the Second World War, regardless of where they were built or previous service history. Submarines show submerged displacement.

Click on headers to sort column alphabetically.

List of ships of World War II (N)
Ship	Country or organization	Class	Type	Displacement (tons)	First commissioned	Fate
Nabob	Royal Navy; Royal Canadian Navy	Ruler	escort carrier	11,400	7 September 1943	Crewed by RCN, paid off 10 October 1944, scrapped December 1977
Nachi	Imperial Japanese Navy	Myōkō	heavy cruiser	13,380		sunk 5 November 1944
Nagara	Imperial Japanese Navy	Nagara	light cruiser	5,088		lost 7 August 1944
Nagato	Imperial Japanese Navy	Nagato	dreadnought	42,850	25 November 1920	sunk as target 29 July 1946
Nagpur	Royal Indian Navy	Basset	minesweeper	529	1941–1944	1941–1944
Nairana	Royal Navy	Nairana	escort carrier	14,280	12 December 1943	to Netherlands 23 March 1946, scrapped 1971
Najaden	Royal Danish Navy	Najaden	torpedo boat	782	1947	
Naka	Imperial Japanese Navy	Sendai	light cruiser	7,100	1925	sunk 17 February 1944
Nanaimo	Royal Canadian Navy	Flower	corvette	925	26 April 1941	paid off 28 September 1945
Napanee	Royal Canadian Navy	Flower	corvette	925	12 May 1941	paid off 12 July 1945
Napier	Royal Australian Navy	N	destroyer	1,773	28 November 1940	25 October 1945
Narbada	Royal Indian Navy	Black Swan	sloop	1,250		Transferred to Pakistan 1948, renamed Jhelum
Narcissus	Royal Navy	Flower	corvette	925	17 July 1941	
Nashville	United States Navy	Brooklyn	light cruiser	9,475	6 June 1938	sold to Chile 1951 (Capitan Prat)
Nasik	Royal Indian Navy	Basset	minesweeper	529	1941–1944	1941–1944
Nassau	United States Navy	Bogue	escort carrier	11,400	20 August 1942	decommissioned 28 October 1946, scrapped June 1961
Nasturtium	Royal Navy	Flower	corvette	925	26 September 1940	
Natal	South African Navy	Loch	frigate	1,435	9 March 1945	Decommissioned 1 September 1965
Natoma Bay	United States Navy	Casablanca	escort carrier	7,800	14 October 1943	decommissioned 20 May 1946, scrapped 1959
Natori	Imperial Japanese Navy	Nagara	light cruiser	5,088		lost 18 August 1944
Natsuzuki	Imperial Japanese Navy	Akizuki	destroyer	2,700	8 April 1945	scrapped after the war
Nehenta Bay	United States Navy	Casablanca	escort carrier	7,800	3 January 1944	decommissioned 15 May 1946, scrapped 1960
Nelson	Royal Navy	Nelson	battleship	34,000	10 September 1927	decommissioned February 1948, scrapped March 1949
Nelson	United States Navy	Gleaves	destroyer	1,630	26 November 1942	decommissioned 1947, scrapped 1969
Nene	Royal Navy; Royal Canadian Navy	River	frigate	1,445	8 April 1943	to Canada 4 June 1944, paid off 11 June 1945
Nepal	Royal Australian Navy	N	destroyer	1,773	29 May 1942	paid off 22 October 1945, sold for scrap 1955
Neptune	Royal Navy	Leander	light cruiser	7,000	23 February 1934	lost 19 December 1941
Nestor	Royal Australian Navy	N	destroyer	1,773	12 February 1941	scuttled 15 June 1942
Nevada	United States Navy	Nevada	battleship	29,000	11 March 1916	decommissioned 29 July 1946; sunk as a target 31 July 1948
New Glasgow	Royal Canadian Navy	River	frigate	1,445	22 December 1943	paid off 30 January 1967
New Jersey	United States Navy	Iowa	battleship	57,271	23 May 1943	decommissioned 1991. museum ship
New Mexico	United States Navy	New Mexico	battleship	33,000	20 May 1918	Scrapped November 1947
New Orleans	United States Navy	New Orleans	heavy cruiser	9,950	12 April 1933	Decommissioned 10 February 1947, scrapped 1959
New Waterford	Royal Canadian Navy	River	frigate	1,445	21 January 1944	paid off 2 December 1966
New Westminster	Royal Canadian Navy	Flower	corvette	925	31 January 1942	paid off 21 June 1945
New York	United States Navy	New York	battleship	27,000	15 April 1914	decommissioned 29 August 1946, sunk as target 8 July 1948
Newark	Royal Navy	Town	destroyer	1,060	26 November 1940	scrapped February 1947
Newfoundland	Royal Navy	Fiji	light cruiser	8,800	21 January 1943	sold to Peru 1959, renamed Almirante Grau
Newmarket	Royal Navy	Town	destroyer	1,060	26 November 1940	scrapped September 1945
Newport	Royal Norwegian Navy	Town	destroyer	1,190	March 1942	June 1942, returned to RN
Niagara	Royal Canadian Navy	Town	destroyer	1,190	24 September 1940	paid off 27 May 1946
Niblack	United States Navy	Gleaves	destroyer	1,630	1 August 1940	Sold 16 August 1973 and broken up for scrap
Nicholson	United States Navy	Gleaves	destroyer	1,630	3 June 1941	to Italy 1951, sunk as target 1975
Niedersachsen	Kriegsmarine		minelayer	1,794	20 December 1943	former French transport Guyane, sunk by HMS Upstart 15 February 1944
Nields	United States Navy	Benson	destroyer	1,620	15 January 1943	decommissioned 1946, scrapped 1972
Niels Juel	Royal Danish Navy	Niels Juel	coastal defence ship	3,400	23 May 1923	beached 29 August 1943, captured by Germany, sunk 3 May 1945
Nigella	Royal Navy	Flower	corvette	925	25 February 1941	
Nigeria	Royal Navy	Fiji	light cruiser	8,000	23 September 1940	sold to India 29 August 1957, renamed Mysore
Nigitsu Maru	Imperial Japanese Army	Type A	landing craft carrier	11,800	March 1943	sunk 12 January 1944
Ning Hai	Republic of China Navy		light cruiser	2,200		became Ioshima (Japan)
Niobe	Kriegsmarine	Holland	anti-aircraft cruiser	4,100	1 March 1941	former Dutch cruiser Gelderland, sunk Kotka 16 July 1944
Nizam	Royal Australian Navy	N	destroyer	1,773	19 December 1940	paid off 17 October 1945, sold for scrap 1955
Noordbrabant	Royal Netherlands Navy	Holland	cruiser	4,033	1 March 1900	Scuttled 17 May 1940
Nootka	Royal Canadian Navy	Tribal	destroyer	1,927	9 August 1946	built and launched during the war, paid off 6 February 1964
Norge	Royal Norwegian Navy	Eidsvold	coastal defence ship	4,230	7 February 1901	sunk 9 April 1940
Norman	Royal Australian Navy	N	destroyer	1,773	29 September 1941	paid off October 1945, sold for scrap 1958
Norsyd	Royal Canadian Navy	Flower modified	corvette	1,015	22 December 1943	25 June 1945
North Bay	Royal Canadian Navy	Flower modified	corvette	1,015	25 October 1943	5 June 1945
North Carolina	United States Navy	North Carolina	battleship	35,000	9 April 1941	decommissioned 27 June 1947, museum ship
Northampton	United States Navy	Northampton	heavy cruiser	9,050	17 May 1930	lost 1 December 1942
Northway	Royal Navy	Casa Grande	Dock landing ship	7,930	15 February 1944	sold 19 March 1948
Noshiro	Imperial Japanese Navy	Agano	light cruiser	6,650		Sunk 26 October 1944
Nubian	Royal Navy	Tribal	destroyer	2,020	6 December 1938	scrapped 1949
Nürnberg	Kriegsmarine		light cruiser	6,980	2 November 1935	transferred to Soviet Union as Admiral Makarov, scrapped 1960
Nymfen	Royal Danish Navy	Najaden	torpedo boat	782	1947	
Nymphe	Kriegsmarine	Tordenskjold	coastal defence ship	3,858	21 March 1898	former Tordenskjold, captured by Germany 9 April 1940, scrapped 1948
