= List of ships of World War II (J) =

The List of ships of the Second World War contains major military vessels of the war, arranged alphabetically and by type. The list includes armed vessels that served during the war and in the immediate aftermath, inclusive of localized ongoing combat operations, garrison surrenders, post-surrender occupation, colony re-occupation, troop and prisoner repatriation, to the end of 1945. For smaller vessels, see also list of World War II ships of less than 1000 tons. Some uncompleted Axis ships are included, out of historic interest. Ships are designated to the country under which they operated for the longest period of the Second World War, regardless of where they were built or previous service history. Submarines show submerged displacement.

Click on headers to sort column alphabetically.

List of ships of World War II (J)
Ship	Country or organization	Class	Type	Displacement (tons)	First commissioned	Fate
J-826	Royal Navy	BYMS	minesweeper	360	1 February 1943	from 1950 oceanographic research vessel RV Calypso
Jackal	Royal Navy	J	destroyer	1,690	31 March 1939	scuttled 11 May 1942
Jacob van Heemskerk	Royal Netherlands Navy	Tromp	light cruiser	4,064	16 September 1939	decommissioned 20 November 1969
Jaguar	Kriegsmarine	Raubtier	torpedo boat	1,320	1 June 1929	sunk 15 June 1944
Jaguar	Royal Navy	J	destroyer	1,690	12 September 1939	sunk 26 March 1942 by U-652
Jamaica	Royal Navy	Fiji	light cruiser	8,000	29 June 1942	scrapped 1960
Janus	Royal Navy	J	destroyer	1,690	5 August 1939	sunk 23 January 1944
Jarvis	United States Navy	Bagley	destroyer	1,500	27 October 1937	sunk 9 August 1942
Jasmine	Royal Navy	Flower	corvette	925	16 May 1941	
Java	Royal Netherlands Navy	Java	cruiser	8,078	1925	sunk 27 February 1942
Javelin	Royal Navy	J	destroyer	1,690	10 June 1939	scrapped 1949
Jean de Vienne	French Navy	La Galissonnière	light cruiser	7,600	10 February 1937	scuttled 27 November 1942
Jeanne d'Arc	French Navy	Jeanne d'Arc	light cruiser	6,496	14 August 1931	scrapped 1965
Jeffers	United States Navy	Gleaves	destroyer	1,630	5 November 1942	decommissioned 1955, scrapped 1973
Jersey	Royal Navy	J	destroyer	1,690	28 April 1939	sank 4 May 1941
Jervis	Royal Navy	J	destroyer	1,690	12 May 1939	scrapped 1949
Jervis Bay	Royal Navy		Armed Merchant Cruiser	14,164	1 October 1940	sunk 5 November 1940
Jintsu	Imperial Japanese Navy	Sendai	light cruiser	7,100	31 July 1925	sunk 13 July 1943
Johan Maurits van Nassau (I)	Royal Netherlands Navy	Johan Maurits van Nassau	gunboat	1,537	5 April 1933	sunk 14 May 1940
Johan Maurits van Nassau (II)	Royal Netherlands Navy	River	frigate	1,400	25 June 1943	decommissioned 1958, sold for scrap 15 January 1959
Johnston	United States Navy	Fletcher	destroyer	2,700	27 October 1943	sunk 25 October 1944
Joliette	Royal Canadian Navy	River	frigate	1,445	14 June 1944	paid off 19 November 1945
Jonquiere	Royal Canadian Navy	River	frigate	1,445	10 May 1944	paid off 23 September 1966
Jonquil	Royal Navy	Flower	corvette	925	21 October 1940	
Jouett	United States Navy	Somers	destroyer	1,850	25 January 1939	scrapped 1946
Juan De Garray	Argentine Navy	Churruca	destroyer	1,522		paid off 25 March 1960
Jujuy	Argentine Navy	Catamarca	destroyer	1,010		Sold 10 January 1957
Jumna	Royal Indian Navy	Black Swan	sloop	1,250	13 May 1941	
Juneau	United States Navy	Atlanta	light cruiser	6,000	14 February 1942	Sunk 13 November 1942
Juno	Royal Navy	J	destroyer	1,690	25 August 1939	sunk 21 May 1941
Jun'yō	Imperial Japanese Navy	Hiyō	light carrier	26,949	5 May 1942	scrapped 1947
Jupiter	Royal Navy	J	destroyer	1,690	25 June 1939	sank 28 February 1942
