= List of ships of World War II (T) =

The List of ships of the Second World War contains major military vessels of the war, arranged alphabetically and by type. The list includes armed vessels that served during the war and in the immediate aftermath, inclusive of localized ongoing combat operations, garrison surrenders, post-surrender occupation, colony re-occupation, troop and prisoner repatriation, to the end of 1945. For smaller vessels, see also list of World War II ships of less than 1000 tons. Some uncompleted Axis ships are included, out of historic interest. Ships are designated to the country under which they operated for the longest period of the Second World War, regardless of where they were built or previous service history. Submarines show submerged displacement.

List of ships of World War II (T)
Ship	Country or organization	Class	Type	Displacement (tons)	First commissioned	Fate
T13	Kriegsmarine	Type 37	torpedo boat	1,098	31 May 1941	sunk in the Skagerrak by RAF bombers, 10 April 1945
T14	Kriegsmarine	Type 37	torpedo boat	1,098	14 June 1941	to France as Dompaire 1947; struck November 1951 and scrapped
T15	Kriegsmarine	Type 37	torpedo boat	1,098	26 June 1941	Sunk in air raid at Kiel, 13 December 1943
T16	Kriegsmarine	Type 37	torpedo boat	1,098	24 July 1941	Damaged beyond repair 13 April 1945; scrapped September 1946
T17	Kriegsmarine	Type 37	torpedo boat	1,098	18 August 1941	To USSR as destroyer Poryvisty 1946; struck December 1959
T18	Kriegsmarine	Type 37	torpedo boat	1,098	22 November 1941	Sunk by Soviet rocket attack off the Åland Islands, 17 September 1944
T19	Kriegsmarine	Type 37	torpedo boat	1,098	18 December 1941	to USA 1945; sold to Denmark 1947; scrapped 1951
T20	Kriegsmarine	Type 37	torpedo boat	1,098	5 June 1942	to France as Baccarat 1946; struck October 1951 and scrapped
T21	Kriegsmarine	Type 37	torpedo boat	1,098	11 July 1942	to USA 1945; scuttled in Skagerrak, 1946
Taihō	Imperial Japanese Navy	Taihō	aircraft carrier	29,300	7 March 1944	Sunk 19 June 1944
Taiyō	Imperial Japanese Navy	Taiyō	escort carrier	18,116	2 September 1941	sunk 18 August 1944
Takanis Bay	United States Navy	Casablanca	escort carrier	7,800	15 April 1944	scrapped 29 June 1960
Takao	Imperial Japanese Navy	Takao	heavy cruiser	13,160	31 May 1932	sunk 31 July 1945
Takatsu Maru	rowspan="2" Imperial Japanese Army	Type B	landing craft carrier	5,656	January 1944	sunk 10 November 1944
Tamatsu Maru	Type A	landing craft carrier	11,910	style="text-align:right;		
Talybont	Royal Navy	Hunt	destroyer	1,050	19 May 1943	paid off 1947; sold for scrap 1961
Tama	Imperial Japanese Navy	Kuma	light cruiser	5,100	29 January 1921	sunk 20 October 1944
Tamarisk	Royal Navy; Hellenic Navy	Flower	corvette	925	November 1943	to Greece as Tombazis November 1943; scrapped 1952
Tanatside	Royal Navy	Hunt	destroyer	1,050	August 1942	paid off 1946; scrapped 1964
Tannenberg	Kriegsmarine		minelayer	1,098	2 September 1939	9 July 1941
Tapperheten	Swedish Navy	Äran	coastal defence ship	3,650	April 1903	paid off June 1947, scrapped 1952
Taranto	Regia Marina	Magdeburg	light cruiser	3,184	1925	former German Strassburg; scuttled 23 September 1943
Tarmo	Finland		escort and icebreaker	2,300	4 January 1908	29 May 1969; museum ship from May 1992
Tartar	Royal Navy	Tribal	destroyer	2,020	10 March 1939	Scrapped 22 February 1948
Tasajera	Royal Navy	Maracaibo	landing ship, tank	4,193	December 1941	paid off 1945
Tatsuta	Imperial Japanese Navy	Tenryu	light cruiser	4,350	31 May 1919	Sunk 13 March 1944
Tattnall	United States Navy	Wickes	destroyer	1,060	26 June 1919	Decommissioned 17 December 1945
Taylor	United States Navy	Fletcher	destroyer	2,050	28 August 1942	Decommissioned 31 May 1946
Teazer	Royal Navy	T	destroyer	1,710	13 September 1943	Scrapped 7 August 1965
Tegualda	Chilean Navy	H	submarine	441	1917	scrapped 1945
Teme	Royal Canadian Navy	River	frigate	1,445	28 February 1944	Torpedoed 29 March 1945, constructive total loss
Tenacious	Royal Navy	T	destroyer	1,710	30 October 1943	scrapped June 1965
Tennessee	United States Navy	Tennessee	battleship	33,190	3 June 1920	Decommissioned 14 February 1947, scrapped 1959
Tenryū	Imperial Japanese Navy	Tenryū	light cruiser	4,350	20 November 1919	Sunk 18 December 1942
Termagant	Royal Navy	T	destroyer	1,710	8 October 1943	paid off 1960, scrapped 5 November 1965
Terpsichore	Royal Navy	T	destroyer	1,710	20 January 1944	scrapped 17 May 1966
Teruzuki	Imperial Japanese Navy	Akizuki	destroyer	2,700	11 June 1942	sunk 12 December 1942
Terror	Royal Navy	Erebus	monitor	8,000	6 August 1916	Sunk 24 February 1941
Tetcott	Royal Navy	Hunt	destroyer	1,050	2 December 1941	scrapped 1956
Teviot	Royal Navy; South African Navy	River	frigate	1,370	30 January 1943	to South Africa 10 June 1945, scrapped March 1955
Texas	United States Navy	New York	battleship	27,000	12 March 1914	Decommissioned 21 April 1948; museum ship
Thane	Royal Navy	Ruler	escort carrier	7,800	19 November 1943	paid off October 1945, scrapped 1946
The Pas	Royal Canadian Navy	Flower	corvette	925	21 October 1941	paid off 24 July 1945
Thetford Mines	Royal Canadian Navy	River	frigate	1,445	24 May 1944	paid off 18 November 1945
Thetis	Kriegsmarine	Tordenskjold	coastal defence ship	3,858	21 March 1898	ex-HNoMS Harald Haarfagre, captured by Germany 9 April 1940, scrapped 1948
Thetis Bay	United States Navy	Casablanca	escort carrier	7,800	12 April 1944	scrapped December 1964
Thompson	United States Navy	Gleaves	destroyer	1,630	10 July 1943	decommissioned 1954, scrapped 1972
Thonburi	Royal Thai Navy	Thonburi	coastal defence ship	2,265	31 January 1938	wrecked 17 January 1941, refitted, struck 19 June 1959
Thor	Kriegsmarine		auxiliary cruiser	9,200	15 March 1940	accidentally burnt 30 November 1942
Thorlock	Royal Canadian Navy	Flower modified	corvette	1,015	13 November 1944	15 July 1945
Thorn	United States Navy	Gleaves	destroyer	1,630	1 April 1943	decommissioned 1946, sunk as target 1974
Thyme	Royal Navy	Flower	corvette	925	23 October 1941	
Ticonderoga	United States Navy	Essex	aircraft carrier	30,800	8 May 1944	decommissioned 1 September 1973, scrapped 1975
Tiger	Kriegsmarine	Raubtier	torpedo boat	1,320	15 January 1929	wrecked in collision with the Z3 Max Schultz 25 August 1939
Tillman	United States Navy	Gleaves	destroyer	1,630	4 June 1942	decommissioned 1947, scrapped 1972
Timmins	Royal Canadian Navy	Flower	corvette	925	10 February 1942	paid off 15 July 1945
Tirpitz	Kriegsmarine	Bismarck	battleship	42,900	25 February 1941	sunk 12 November 1944
Tjerk Hiddes	Royal Netherlands Navy	N	destroyer	1,760	27 May 1942	Transferred to Indonesia 1 March 1951, renamed Gadja Mada. Scrapped 1961
Togo	Kriegsmarine		Night fighter direction vessel	12,700	13 August 1938	post-war troop transport, sold into merchant service November 1956; ran aground off Mexico 21 November 1984
Tokiwa	Imperial Japanese Navy	Asama	armored cruiser	9,700	18 May 1899	Sunk 9 August 1945
Tone	Imperial Japanese Navy	Tone	heavy cruiser	15,200	30 November 1938	Sunk 14 July 1945
Topeka	United States Navy	Cleveland	light cruiser	11,800	23 December 1944	converted to missile cruiser 1960, scrapped 1975
Toronto	Royal Canadian Navy	River	frigate	1,445	6 May 1944	paid off 14 April 1956
Torridge	Royal Navy; Free French Naval Forces	River	frigate	1,370	1944	to Free French 1944 as Surprise
Tortuga	United States Navy	Casa Grande	Dock landing ship	7,930	8 June 1945	scrapped 1988
Tourville	French Navy; Free French Naval Forces	Duquesne	heavy cruiser	10,000	1 December 1928	condemned 1962
Tracker	Royal Navy	Ruler	escort carrier	14,400	31 January 1943	paid off 2 November 1946, scrapped 1964
Trafalgar	Royal Navy	Battle	destroyer	2,325	23 July 1945	paid off 1963, scrapped 1970
Trail	Royal Canadian Navy	Flower	corvette	925	30 April 1941	paid off 17 July 1945
Transylvania	Royal Navy		armed merchant cruiser	16,923	5 October 1939	sunk 10 August 1940
Transvaal	South African Navy	Loch	frigate	1,435	21 May 1945	Decommissioned 14 August 1964, and sunk as artificial reef
Travancore	Royal Indian Navy	Basset	minesweeper	529	1941–1944	1941–1944
Trento	Regia Marina	Trento	heavy cruiser	10,511	1929	sunk 14 June 1942
Trentonian	Royal Canadian Navy	Flower modified	corvette	1,015	1 December 1943	sunk 22 February 1945 by U-1004
Trenton	United States Navy	Omaha	light cruiser	7,050	19 April 1924	scrapped 1946
Trieste	Regia Marina	Trento	heavy cruiser	10,511	1928	sunk 1943
Trillium	Royal Canadian Navy	Flower	corvette	925	31 October 1940	paid off 27 June 1945
Trinidad	Royal Navy	Fiji	light cruiser	8,000	14 October 1941	sunk 15 May 1942
Tripoli	United States Navy	Casablanca	escort carrier	7,800	31 October 1943	scrapped 1960
Trippe	United States Navy	Benham	destroyer	1,500	1 November 1939	scuttled after A-bomb test 1948
Tromp	Royal Netherlands Navy	Tromp	light cruiser/flotilla leader	3,455	18 August 1938	decommissioned 1955
Troubridge	Royal Navy	T	destroyer	1,710	8 March 1943	paid off 27 March 1969, scrapped 1970
Trouncer	Royal Navy	Ruler	escort carrier	7,800	31 January 1944	paid off 12 April 1946, scrapped 1973
Trumpeter	Royal Navy	Ruler	escort carrier	7,800	4 August 1943	paid off 19 June 1946, scrapped 1971
Tucker	United States Navy	Mahan	destroyer	1,450	23 July 1936	sunk 4 August 1942
Tucuman	Argentine Navy	Mendoza	destroyer	1,570	3 May 1929	Discarded 30 April 1962
Tucson	United States Navy	Atlanta	light cruiser	6,000	3 February 1945	scrapped 1971
Tulagi	United States Navy	Casablanca	escort carrier	7,800	21 December 1943	decommissioned 30 April 1946
Tulip	Royal Navy	Flower	corvette	925	18 November 1940	sold 1947 as whaling ship; laid up 1962; scrapped 1965
Tumult	Royal Navy	T	destroyer	1,710	2 April 1943	Scrapped 25 October 1965
Turner	United States Navy	Gleaves	destroyer	1,630	15 April 1943	exploded 3 January 1944
Tuscaloosa	United States Navy	New Orleans	heavy cruiser	9,950	17 August 1934	Decommissioned 13 February 1946, scrapped 1959
Tuscan	Royal Navy	T	destroyer	1,710	11 March 1943	Scrapped 26 May 1966
Tsingtau	Kriegsmarine		Supply escort and Schnellboot tender	2,490	24 September 1934	February 1950
Tung Chi	Republic of China Navy	Fu An	gunship	1,900	1895	Sunk 11 August 1937
Tunisien	Free French Naval Forces	Cannon	destroyer escort	1,240	11 February 1944	Decommissioned May 1964
Tunsberg Castle	Royal Norwegian Navy	Castle-class corvette	corvette	1,010	17 April 1944	former HMS Shrewsbury Castle; sunk 12 December 1944
Tynedale	Royal Navy	Hunt	destroyer	1,050	2 December 1940	sunk 12 December 1943
Tyrian	Royal Navy	T	destroyer	1,710	8 April 1943	scrapped 9 March 1965
