= List of ships of World War II (B) =

The List of ships of the Second World War contains major military vessels of the war, arranged alphabetically and by type. The list includes armed vessels that served during the war and in the immediate aftermath, inclusive of localized ongoing combat operations, garrison surrenders, post-surrender occupation, colony re-occupation, troop and prisoner repatriation, to the end of 1945. For smaller vessels, see also list of World War II ships of less than 1000 tons. Some uncompleted Axis ships are included, out of historic interest. Ships are designated to the country under which they operated for the longest period of the Second World War, regardless of where they were built or previous service history. Submarines show submerged displacement.

Click on headers to sort column alphabetically.

List of ships of World War II (B)
Ship	Country or organization	Class	Type	Displacement (tons)	First commissioned	Fate
Babbitt	United States Navy	Wickes	destroyer	1,190	24 October 1919	scrapped 1946
Bachaquero	Royal Navy	Maracaibo	landing ship, tank	4,193	August 1941	paid off 1945
Bache	United States Navy	Fletcher	destroyer	2,050	14 November 1942	scrapped 1968
Badger	United States Navy	Wickes	destroyer	1,190	29 May 1919	scrapped 1945
Badsworth	Royal Navy; Royal Norwegian Navy	Hunt	destroyer escort	1,050	18 August 1941	paid off 16 November 1944, to Norway as Arendal 8 August 1944
Bagley	United States Navy	Bagley	destroyer	1,500	12 June 1937	scrapped 1947
Bahia	Brazilian Navy	Bahia-class	light cruiser	3,100	1910	lost 4 July 1945
Bailey (DD-492)	United States Navy	Benson	destroyer	1,620	11 May 1942	decommissioned 1946, sunk as target 1969
Bainbridge	United States Navy	Clemson	destroyer	1,200	9 February 1921	scrapped 1945
Bairoko	United States Navy	Commencement Bay	escort carrier	10,200	16 July 1945	decommissioned 1955, scrapped 1960
Baker	United States Navy	Cannon	destroyer escort	1,240	23 December 1943	to France 1952, sunk as target 1970
Balch	United States Navy	Porter	destroyer	1,850	20 October 1936	scrapped 1946
Baldwin	United States Navy	Gleaves	destroyer	1,630	30 April 1943	decommissioned 1946, scuttled 1961
Baltimore	United States Navy	Baltimore-class	heavy cruiser	17,200	15 April 1943	decommissioned 2 July 1954, scrapped 1972
Banckert	Royal Netherlands Navy	Admiralen class	destroyer	1,337	14 November 1930	Sunk as targetship September 1949
Bancroft	United States Navy	Benson	destroyer	1,620	30 April 1942	decommissioned 1946, scrapped 1973
Bangust	United States Navy	Cannon	destroyer escort	1,240	30 October 1943	to Peru 1952, scrapped 1979
Barb	United States Navy	Gato-class	submarine	2460	2 April 1942	sold to Italy as Enrico Tazzoli 1954, scrapped 1973
Barber	United States Navy	Buckley	destroyer escort	1,400	10 October 1943	to Mexico 1969, struck 2001
Barham	Royal Navy	Queen Elizabeth	battleship	31,000	19 August 1915	sunk 25 November 1941
Bari	Regia Marina	Pillau	light cruiser	3,284	1925	sunk 28 June 1943
Barfleur	Royal Navy	Battle	destroyer	2,325	14 September 1944	paid off 1958, scrapped 1966
Barker	United States Navy	Clemson	destroyer	1,200	17 December 1919	scrapped 1945
Barnes	United States Navy	Bogue	escort carrier	11,400	20 February 1943	Decommissioned 29 August 1946, scrapped 1959
Barney	United States Navy	Wickes	destroyer	1,190	14 March 1919	scrapped 1946
Baroda	Royal Indian Navy	Basset	minesweeper	529	December 1942	to Pakistan 1948
Baron	United States Navy	Cannon	destroyer escort	1,240	5 July 1943	to Uruguay 1952, scrapped 1990
Barr	United States Navy	Buckley	destroyer escort	1,400	16 February 1944	sunk as target 1963
Barrie	Royal Canadian Navy	Flower	corvette	925	12 May 1941	paid off 26 June 1945
Barry	United States Navy	Clemson	destroyer	1,200	15 November 1921	sunk 21 June 1945
Bartolomeo Colleoni	Regia Marina	Giussano-class	light cruiser	5,200	10 February 1932	Sunk 19 July 1940
Barton	United States Navy	Benson	destroyer	1,620	29 May 1942	sunk 13 November 1942
Barton	United States Navy	Sumner	destroyer	2,200	30 December 1943	sunk as target 1969
Basilisk	Royal Navy	B	destroyer	1,350	4 March 1931	sunk 1 June 1940
Bataan	Royal Australian Navy	Tribal	destroyer	2,020	25 May 1945	scrapped 1958
Bataan	United States Navy	Independence	light aircraft carrier	11,000	17 November 1943	decommissioned 9 April 1954, scrapped 1960
Bates	United States Navy	Buckley	destroyer escort	1,400	13 September 1943	sunk by kamikazes 25 May 1945
Bath	Royal Navy; Royal Norwegian Navy	Town	destroyer	1,190	23 September 1940	to Norway as HNoMS Bath 9 January 1941, sunk on 19 August 1941
Battleford	Royal Canadian Navy	Flower	corvette	925	31 July 1941	paid off 18 July 1945
Battler	Royal Navy	Attacker	escort carrier	10,000	31 October 1942	paid off 12 February 1946, scrapped 14 May 1946
Bauru	United States; Brazilian Navy	Cannon	destroyer escort	1,240	11 October 1943	to Brazil 16 August 1944, paid off 17 September 1981, museum ship
Beacon Hill	Royal Canadian Navy	River	frigate	1,445	16 May 1944	paid off 15 September 1967
Beagle	Royal Navy	B	destroyer	1,350	9 April 1931	scrapped January 1946
Beale	United States Navy	Fletcher	destroyer	2,050	23 December 1942	sunk as target 1969
Béarn	French Navy; Free French Naval Forces		aircraft carrier	22,150	May 1927	stricken November 1966, scrapped March 1967
Bearss	United States Navy	Fletcher	destroyer	2,050	12 April 1944	decommissioned 1963, scrapped 1976
Beatty (I)	United States Navy	Gleaves	destroyer	1,630	7 May 1942	sunk 6 November 1943
Beatty (II)	United States Navy	Sumner	destroyer	2,200	31 March 1945	to Venezuela 1972, scrapped 1981
Beaufort	Royal Navy	Hunt	destroyer escort	1,000	3 November 1941	scrapped 1965
Beauharnois	Royal Canadian Navy	Flower modified	corvette	1,015	25 September 1944	12 July 1945
Bebas	United States Navy	Evarts	destroyer escort	1,140	15 May 1943	scrapped 1945
Beberibe	United States; Brazilian Navy	Cannon	destroyer escort	1,240	6 October 1943	to Brazil 1 August 1944, paid off 1968
Bedouin	Royal Navy	Tribal	destroyer	2,020	15 March 1939	Sunk 15 June 1942
Begonia	Royal Navy; United States Navy	Flower	corvette	925	3 March 1941	to USA as Impulse 10 March 1942, to UK 22 August 1945, paid off 22 July 1948
Begum	Royal Navy	Ruler	escort carrier	11,400	2 August 1943	paid off 20 March 1946, scrapped 1974
Belfast	Royal Navy	Town-class	light cruiser	11,553	5 August 1939	Museum ship since 21 October 1971 moored in London next to Tower Bridge
Bell	United States Navy	Fletcher	destroyer	2,050	4 March 1943	decommissioned 1946, sunk as target 1975
Belle Grove	United States Navy	Ashland	Dock landing ship	7,930	9 August 1943	Stricken 12 November 1969
Belleau Wood	United States Navy	Independence	light aircraft carrier	11,000	31 March 1943	decommissioned 13 January 1947, scrapped 1961
Belleville	Royal Canadian Navy	Flower modified	corvette	1,015	19 October 1944	5 July 1945
Bellwort	Royal Navy	Flower	corvette	925	20 November 1941	
Belmont	Royal Navy	Town	destroyer	1,200	8 October 1940	sunk 31 January 1942
Belvoir	Royal Navy	Hunt	destroyer escort	1,050	29 March 1942	paid off 1957, scrapped 21 October 1957
Benevente	United States; Brazilian Navy	Cannon	destroyer escort	1,240	23 October 1943	to Brazil 19 December 1944, paid off 1964
Bengal	Royal Indian Navy	Bathurst	corvette	1,025	8 August 1942	Decommissioned 1960
Benham (I)	United States Navy	Benham	destroyer	1,500	2 February 1939	sunk 15 November 1942
Benham (II)	United States Navy	Fletcher	destroyer	2,050	20 December 1943	to Peru 1960, scrapped 1980
Benner	United States Navy	Gearing	destroyer	2,250	13 February 1945	scrapped 1975
Bennett	United States Navy	Fletcher	destroyer	2,050	9 February 1943	to Brazil 1959, scrapped 1978
Bennington	United States Navy	Essex	aircraft carrier	30,800	6 August 1944	decommissioned 15 January 1970, scrapped 1994
Bennion	United States Navy	Fletcher	destroyer	2,050	14 December 1943	decommissioned 1946, scrapped 1973
Benson	United States Navy	Benson	destroyer	1,620	25 July 1940	transferred to Taiwan 1954, scrapped 1974
Berar	Royal Indian Navy	Basset	minesweeper	529	October 1942	decommissioned 1946
Bergamot	Royal Navy	Flower	corvette	925	12 May 1941	
Berkeley	Royal Navy	Hunt	destroyer escort	1,000	6 June 1940	scuttled 19 August 1942
Bermuda	Royal Navy	Fiji-class	light cruiser	8,000	21 August 1942	scrapped 1965
Bernadou	United States Navy	Wickes	destroyer	1,190	19 May 1919	scrapped 1945
Bertioga	United States; Brazilian Navy	Cannon	destroyer escort	1,240	15 September 1943	to Brazil 1 August 1944, paid off 1964
Betony	Royal Navy; Royal Indian Navy	Flower modified	corvette	1,015	31 August 1943	to RIN as Sind 24 March 1945
Beverley	Royal Navy	Town	destroyer	1,200	8 October 1940	sunk 11 April 1943
Biddle	United States Navy	Wickes	destroyer	1,190	22 April 1919	scrapped 1946
Bicester	Royal Navy	Hunt	destroyer escort	1,050	9 May 1942	paid off 1955, scrapped 1956
Bideford	Royal Navy	Shoreham	Sloop	1,105	23 February 1932	Sold 14 September 1947
Big Horn	United States Navy		Q-ship		15 April 1942	6 May 1946
Biloxi	United States Navy	Cleveland-class	light cruiser	11,800	31 August 1943	Scrapped 1962
HMS Birmingham	Royal Navy	Southampton-class	light cruiser	9,770	18 November 1937	scrapped 1960
USS Birmingham	United States Navy	Cleveland-class	light cruiser	11,800	29 January 1943	Scrapped 1959
Bismarck	Kriegsmarine	Bismarck	battleship	41,700	24 August 1940	sunk 27 May 1941
Bismarck Sea	United States Navy	Casablanca	escort carrier	7,800	20 May 1944	sunk 21 February 1945
Biter	Royal Navy	Attacker	escort carrier	8,200	5 May 1942	Transferred to France as Dixmude 1945
Bittersweet	Royal Navy; Royal Canadian Navy	Flower	corvette	925	23 January 1941	to Canada 15 May 1941, paid off 22 June 1945
Bivin	United States Navy	Butler	destroyer escort	1,350	31 October 1944	decommissioned 1947, sunk as target 1969
Black	United States Navy	Fletcher	destroyer	2,050	21 May 1943	scrapped 1971
Black Prince	Royal Navy	Dido-class	light cruiser	5,950	30 November 1943	Decommissioned March 1962
Blackmore	Royal Navy	Hunt	destroyer escort	1,050	14 April 1942	
Blair	United States Navy	Edsall	destroyer escort	1,250	13 September 1943	decommissioned 1960, scrapped 1972
Blakeley	United States Navy	Wickes	destroyer	1,190	8 May 1919	scrapped 1945
Blanche	Royal Navy	B	destroyer	1,350	14 February 1931	sunk 13 November 1939
Blanco Encalada	Chilean Navy	Blanco Encalada	protected cruiser	3,435	1893	scrapped 1946
Blankney	Royal Navy	Hunt	destroyer escort	1,050	11 April 1941	scrapped 1958
Blean	Royal Navy	Hunt	destroyer escort	1,050	23 August 1942	sunk 11 December 1942 by U-443
Bleasdale	Royal Navy	Hunt	destroyer escort	1,050	16 April 1942	paid off 1956, scrapped14 September 1956
Blencathra	Royal Navy	Hunt	destroyer escort	1,050	14 December 1940	paid off July 1948, scrapped 1957
Blessman	United States Navy	Buckley	destroyer escort	1,400	19 September 1943	to Taiwan 1967, scrapped 1995
Block Island	United States Navy	Bogue	escort carrier	9,800	8 March 1943	Sunk 29 May 1944
Block Island	United States Navy	Commencement Bay	escort carrier	14,400	30 December 1944	decommissioned 1954, scrapped 1960
Blücher	Kriegsmarine	Admiral Hipper-class	heavy cruiser	14,000	20 September 1939	sunk 9 April 1940
Blue (I)	United States Navy	Bagley	destroyer	1,500	14 August 1937	sunk 22 August 1942
Blue (II)	United States Navy	Sumner	destroyer	2,200	20 March 1944	sunk as target 1974
Bluebell	Royal Navy	Flower	corvette	925	19 July 1940	sunk on 17 February 1945 by U-711
Błyskawica	Poland	Grom	destroyer	1,975	25 November 1937	decommissioned 1 May 1976, preserved as museum ship
Boadicea	Royal Navy	B	destroyer	1,350	7 April 1931	sunk 13 June 1944
Bocaina	United States; Brazilian Navy	Cannon	destroyer escort	1,240	3 September 1943	to Brazil 20 March 1945, paid off 1975
Boggs	United States Navy	Wickes	minesweeper destroyer	1,190	23 September 1918	scrapped 1946
Bogue	United States Navy	Bogue	escort carrier	9,800	26 September 1942	Decommissioned 30 November 1946, scrapped 1960
Boise	United States Navy	Brooklyn-class	light cruiser	9,950	12 August 1938	Decommissioned 11 January 1951, sold to Argentina. Scrapped 1978
Bolzano	Regia Marina	Trento class	heavy cruiser	10,511	1933	sunk 1944
Bombay	Royal Indian Navy	Bathurst	corvette	1,025	24 April 1942	Decommissioned 1960
Bon Homme Richard	United States Navy	Essex	aircraft carrier	30,800	26 November 1944	decommissioned 2 July 1971, scrapped 1992
Booth	United States Navy	Cannon	destroyer escort	1,240	19 September 1943	to Philippines 1967, lost in typhoon 1981
Borage	Royal Navy	Flower	corvette	925	29 April 1942	
Bordelon	United States Navy	Gearing	destroyer	2,250	5 June 1945	to Iran 1977
Boreas	Royal Navy; Hellenic Navy	B	destroyer	1,350	20 February 1931	to Greece as Salamis 1944, scrapped 1951
Borie (I)	United States Navy	Clemson	destroyer	1,200	24 March 1920	sank 2 November 1943 after ramming and sinking U-405
Borie (II)	United States Navy	Sumner	destroyer	2,200	21 September 1944	to Argentina 1972, scrapped 1984
Borum	United States Navy	Buckley	destroyer escort	1,400	30 November 1943	decommissioned 1946, scrapped 1966
Boston	United States Navy	Baltimore-class	heavy cruiser	17,200	30 June 1943	decommissioned 1970, scrapped 1975
Bostwick	United States Navy	Cannon	destroyer escort	1,240	1 December 1943	to Republic of China 1948, scrapped 1972
Bougainville	United States Navy	Casablanca	escort carrier	7,800	18 June 1944	decommissioned 1946, scrapped 1960
Bowers	United States Navy	Buckley	destroyer escort	1,400	27 January 1944	to Philippines 1961
Boxer	Royal Navy		landing ship, tank	3,620	10 April 1943	paid off 1958
Boxer	United States Navy	Ticonderoga	aircraft carrier	30,800	16 April 1945	decommissioned 1 December 1969, scrapped 1971
Boyd	United States Navy	Fletcher	destroyer	2,050	8 May 1943	to Turkey 1969, scrapped 1981
Boyle	United States Navy	Benson	destroyer	1,620	15 August 1942	decommissioned 1946, sunk as target 1973
Brackett	United States Navy	Evarts	destroyer escort	1,140	18 October 1943	scrapped 1947
Bracui	United States; Brazilian Navy	Cannon	destroyer escort	1,240	29 September 1943	to Brazil 15 August 1944, paid off 11 July 1972
Bradford	Royal Navy	Town	destroyer	1,200	8 October 1940	scrapped 1946
Bradford	United States Navy	Fletcher	destroyer	2,050	12 June 1943	to Greece 1962, scrapped 1981
Braid	Royal Navy; Free French Naval Forces	River	frigate	1,370	21 January 1944	to Free French as Aventure 21 January 1944, paid off 1964
Braine	United States Navy	Fletcher	destroyer	2,050	11 May 1943	to Argentina 1971, sunk as target 1983
Bramham	Royal Navy	Hunt	destroyer escort	1,050	16 June 1942	paid off March 1943, scrapped 1960
Brandenburg	Kriegsmarine		minelayer	3,894	1 May 1943	captured French transport Kita, sunk 21 September 1943
Brandon	Royal Canadian Navy	Flower	corvette	925	22 July 1941	paid off 22 June 1945
Brantford	Royal Canadian Navy	Flower	corvette	925	15 May 1942	paid off 17 August 1945
Brazen	Royal Navy	B	destroyer	1,350	8 April 1931	sunk 20 July 1940
Breckinridge	United States Navy	Wickes	destroyer	1,190	27 February 1919	scrapped 1946
Brecon	Royal Navy	Hunt	destroyer escort	1,175	18 December 1942	Paid off 12 December 1945
Breeman	United States Navy	Cannon	destroyer escort	1,240	12 December 1943	to Republic of China 1948, scrapped 1972
Breese	United States Navy	Wickes	minelayer destroyer	1,190	23 October 1918	scrapped May 1946
Bremerton	United States Navy	Baltimore-class	heavy cruiser	17,200	29 April 1945	decommissioned 1960, scrapped 1974
Brennan	United States Navy	Evarts	destroyer escort	1,140	20 January 1943	scrapped 1946
Bretagne	French Navy	Bretagne	super dreadnought	22,200	September 1915	sunk 3 July 1940
Breton	United States Navy	Bogue	escort carrier	7,800	12 April 1943	decommissioned 1946, scrapped 1972
Bright	United States Navy	Cannon	destroyer escort	1,240	30 June 1944	to France 1950, scrapped 1965
Brighton	Royal Navy; Soviet Navy	Town	destroyer	1,200	23 September 1940	to USSR as Zharki 16 July 1944
Brilliant	Royal Navy	B	destroyer	1,350	21 February 1931	scrapped August 1947
Brisk	United States Navy	Flower modified	corvette	1,015	6 December 1942	9 October 1945
Brissenden	Royal Navy	Hunt	destroyer escort	1,175	12 February 1943	Paid off 19 June 1948
Brister	United States Navy	Edsall	destroyer escort	1,250	30 November 1943	scrapped 1968
Bristol (I)	United States Navy	Gleaves	destroyer	1,630	22 October 1941	sunk 13 October 1943
Bristol (II)	United States Navy	Sumner	destroyer	2,200	17 March 1945	to Taiwan 1969, scrapped 1993
Broadwater	Royal Navy	Town	destroyer	1,200	9 October 1940	sunk 18 October 1941
Broadway	Royal Navy	Town	destroyer	1,200	8 October 1940	scrapped 1947
Brocklesby	Royal Navy	Hunt	destroyer escort	1,050	9 April 1941	paid off 22 June 1963, scrapped 1968
Bronstein	United States Navy	Cannon	destroyer escort	1,240	13 December 1943	to Uruguay 1952, scrapped 1988
Brooklyn	United States Navy	Brooklyn-class	light cruiser	9,950	30 September 1937	Decommissioned 3 January 1947, sold to Chile. Sank in Pacific 1992
Brooks	United States Navy	Clemson	destroyer	1,200	18 June 1920	constructive loss 6 January 1945, scrapped
Broome	United States Navy	Clemson	destroyer	1,200	31 October 1919	scrapped 1946
Brough	United States Navy	Edsall	destroyer escort	1,250	18 September 1943	scrapped 1967
Brown	United States Navy	Fletcher	destroyer	2,050	10 July 1943	to Greece 1962, scrapped 1981
Brownson	United States Navy	Fletcher	destroyer	2,050	3 February 1943	sunk 26 December 1943
Brummer	Kriegsmarine		minelayer	1,924	9 April 1940	Captured from Norway 9 April 1940, sunk May 1945
Brush	United States Navy	Sumner	destroyer	2,200	17 April 1944	to Taiwan 1969
Brutus	Royal Navy		Special Service Ship	5,945		paid off March 1941
Bryant	United States Navy	Fletcher	destroyer	2,050	4 December 1943	decommissioned 1947, sunk as a target 1969
Bryony	Royal Navy	Flower	corvette	925	4 June 1942	sunk on 15 April 1941by aircraft
Buchanan (II)	United States Navy	Gleaves	destroyer	1,630	21 March 1942	to Turkey 1949, scrapped 1976
Buck	United States Navy	Sims	destroyer	1,570	15 May 1940	sunk 9 October 1943
Buckingham	Royal Canadian Navy	River	frigate	1,445	2 November 1944	paid off 23 March 1965
Buckingham	United States Navy	Haskell	amphibious assault ship	536	23 January 1945	scrapped 1974
Buckley	United States Navy	Buckley	destroyer escort	1,400	30 April 1943	scrapped 1969
Buctouche	Royal Canadian Navy	Flower	corvette	925	5 June 1941	paid off 15 June 1945
Buenos Aires	Argentine Navy	Buenos Aires	destroyer	1,375	4 April 1938	1971
Bull	United States Navy	Buckley	destroyer escort	1,400	12 August 1943	to Taiwan 1966, scrapped 1995
Bullard	United States Navy	Fletcher	destroyer	2,050	9 April 1943	decommissioned 1946, scrapped 1973
Bulldog	Royal Navy	B	destroyer	1,350	8 April 1931	scrapped January 1946
Bulmer	United States Navy	Clemson	destroyer	1,200	16 August 1920	scrapped 1947
Bunch	United States Navy	Buckley	destroyer escort	1,400	21 August 1943	decommissioned 1946, scrapped 1965
Bunker Hill	United States Navy	Essex	aircraft carrier	30,800	24 May 1943	decommissioned 9 January 1947, scrapped 1973
Burden R. Hastings	United States Navy	Evarts	destroyer escort	1,140	1 May 1943	scrapped 1946
Burdock	Royal Navy	Flower	corvette	925	27 March 1941	
Burke	United States Navy	Buckley	destroyer escort	1,400	20 July 1943	to Colombia 1968, scrapped 1974
Burnet	Royal Navy; Royal Indian Navy	Flower modified	corvette	1,015	23 September 1943	to RIN as Gondwana 15 May 1945
Burnham	Royal Navy	Town	destroyer	1,200	8 October 1940	scrapped 1948
Burns	United States Navy	Fletcher	destroyer	2,050	3 April 1943	decommissioned 1946, sunk as target 1974
Burrows	United States Navy	Cannon	destroyer escort	1,240	19 December 1943	to Netherlands 1950, scrapped 1968
Burwell	Royal Navy	Town	destroyer	1,200	8 October 1940	scrapped 1947
Burza	Poland	Wicher	destroyer	1,400	10 July 1932	Scrapped 1977
Bush	United States Navy	Fletcher	destroyer	2,050	10 May 1943	sunk 6 April 1945
Butler	United States Navy	Gleaves	destroyer	1,630	15 August 1942	scrapped 1948
Buttercup	Royal Navy	Flower	corvette	925	24 April 1942	served RNSB, to Norway 20 December 1944
Buxton	Royal Navy; Royal Canadian Navy	Town	destroyer	1,215	8 October 1940	to RCN August 1942 as HMCS Buxton, paid off 1945
