= List of ships of World War II (K) =

The List of ships of the Second World War contains major military vessels of the war, arranged alphabetically and by type. The list includes armed vessels that served during the war and in the immediate aftermath, inclusive of localized ongoing combat operations, garrison surrenders, post-surrender occupation, colony re-occupation, troop and prisoner repatriation, to the end of 1945. For smaller vessels, see also list of World War II ships of less than 1000 tons. Some uncompleted Axis ships are included, out of historic interest. Ships are designated to the country under which they operated for the longest period of the Second World War, regardless of where they were built or previous service history. Submarines show submerged displacement.

Click on headers to sort column alphabetically.

List of ships of World War II (K)
Ship	Country or organization	Class	Type	Displacement (tons)	First commissioned	Fate
Kadashan Bay	United States Navy	Casablanca	escort carrier	7,800	18 January 1944	decommissioned 14 June 1946, scrapped 1959
Kaga	Imperial Japanese Navy		aircraft carrier	38,200	1 November 1929	sunk 4 June 1942
Kaganovich	Soviet Navy	Maxim Gorkiy (Project 26 bis)	heavy cruiser	8,200	6 December 1944	
Kako	Imperial Japanese Navy	Furutaka	heavy cruiser	7,950	31 July 1926	sunk 10 August 1942
Kaiyō	Imperial Japanese Navy		escort carrier	13,600	23 November 1943	former troop transport; scrapped 1 September 1946
Kalinin Bay	United States Navy	Casablanca	escort carrier	7,800	27 November 1943	decommissioned 15 May 1946, scrapped 1947
Kalinin	Soviet Navy	Maxim Gorkiy (Project 26 bis)	heavy cruiser	8,200	31 December 1942	
Kalk	United States Navy	Benson	destroyer	1,620	17 October 1942	decommissioned 1946, sunk as target 1969
Kamloops	Royal Canadian Navy	Flower	corvette	925	17 March 1941	paid off 27 June 1945
Kamsack	Royal Canadian Navy	Flower	corvette	925	4 October 1941	paid off 22 July 1945
Kanaris	Hellenic Navy	Hunt	destroyer	1,050	10 August 1942	paid off 1959, scrapped 1960
Kandahar	Royal Navy	K	destroyer	1,690	10 October 1939	sunk 20 December 1941
Karachi	Royal Indian Navy	Basset	minesweeper	529	1941–1944	1941–1944
Karlsruhe	Kriegsmarine	K	light cruiser	6,650	6 November 1929	sunk 9 April 1940
Kasaan Bay	United States Navy	Casablanca	escort carrier	7,800	4 December 1943	decommissioned 6 July 1946, scrapped 1960
Kashii	Imperial Japanese Navy	Katori	light cruiser	6,180	15 July 1941	sunk 12 January 1945
Kashima	Imperial Japanese Navy	Katori	light cruiser	6,180	31 May 1940	struck 5 October 1945; scrapped 1947
Kashmir	Royal Navy	K	destroyer	1,690	26 October 1939	sunk 23 May 1941
Katori	Imperial Japanese Navy	Katori	light cruiser	6,180	20 April 1940	sunk 18 February 1944
Katsuragi	Imperial Japanese Navy	Unryū	aircraft carrier	17,150	15 October 1944	Scrapped 1947
Kearny	United States Navy	Gleaves	destroyer	1,630	13 September 1940	decommissioned 1946, scrapped 1972
Keith	Royal Navy	B	destroyer	1,350	20 March 1931	sunk 1 June 1940
Kelly	Royal Navy	K	destroyer	1,690	23 August 1939	sunk 23 May 1941
Kelvin	Royal Navy	K	destroyer	1,690	27 November 1939	scrapped 1949
Kempenfelt	Royal Navy	W	destroyer	1,710	25 October 1943	paid off January 1946
Kendrick	United States Navy	Benson	destroyer	1,620	12 September 1942	decommissioned 1946, sunk as target 1966
Kenogami	Royal Canadian Navy	Flower	corvette	925	29 June 1941	paid off 9 July 1945
Kent	Royal Navy	County	heavy cruiser	9,750	25 June 1928	scrapped January 1948
Kenya	Royal Navy	Fiji	light cruiser	8,000	27 September 1940	scrapped 1962
Khartoum	Royal Navy	K	destroyer	1,690	6 November 1939	sunk 23 June 1940
Khedive	Royal Navy	Ruler	escort carrier	11,400	25 August 1943	paid off 19 July 1946, scrapped 1975
Kidd	United States Navy	Fletcher	destroyer	2,500	23 April 1943	decommissioned 1964, museum ship at Baton Rouge, LA
Kilkis	Hellenic Navy	Mississippi	battleship	13,000	1 February 1908	former USS Mississippi (BB-23); sunk 23 April 1941
Kimberley	Royal Navy	K	destroyer	1,690	21 February 1940	scrapped 1949
Kibitsu Maru	Imperial Japanese Army	M Type A	landing craft carrier		December 1943	
King George V	Royal Navy	King George V	battleship	35,000	11 December 1940	decommissioned and scrapped 1949
Kingcup	Royal Navy	Flower	corvette	925	30 December 1940	
Kingston	Royal Navy	K	destroyer	1,690	14 September 1939	constructive total loss 11 April 1942
Kinu	Imperial Japanese Navy	Nagara	light cruiser	5,088	10 November 1922	sunk 26 October 1944
Kinugasa	Imperial Japanese Navy	Aoba	heavy cruiser	9,000	30 September 1927	sunk 13 November 1942
Kipling	Royal Navy	K	destroyer	1,690	22 December 1939	sunk 11 May 1942
Kirishima	Imperial Japanese Navy	Kongō	battlecruiser	36,600	19 April 1915	sunk 15 November 1942
Kirkland Lake	Royal Canadian Navy	River	frigate	1,445	21 August 1944	paid off 14 December 1945
Kirov	Soviet Navy	Kirov (Project 26)	heavy cruiser	7,880	23 September 1938	scrapped 1974
Kiso	Imperial Japanese Navy	Kuma	light cruiser	5,100	29 January 1921	20 March 1944; sunk by USN aircraft west of Cavite
Kistna	Royal Indian Navy	Black Swan	sloop	1,350	26 August 1943	Scrapped 1980
Kitakami	Imperial Japanese Navy	Kuma	light cruiser	5,100	15 April 1921	30 November 1945; scrapped
Kitchener	Royal Canadian Navy	Flower	corvette	925	28 June 1942	paid off 11 July 1945
Kitkun Bay	United States Navy	Casablanca	escort carrier	7,800	15 December 1943	decommissioned 19 April 1946, scrapped 1947
Knapp	United States Navy	Fletcher	destroyer	2,500	16 September 1943	Decommissioned: 4 March 1957, scrapped 1972
Knight	United States Navy	Gleaves	destroyer	1,630	23 June 1942	decommissioned 1947, sunk as target 1967
Kokanee	Royal Canadian Navy	River	frigate	1,445	6 June 1944	paid off 21 December 1945
Köln	Kriegsmarine	K	light cruiser	6,650	January 1930	sunk 3 March 1945
Komet	Kriegsmarine		auxiliary cruiser	7,500	2 June 1940	sunk 14 October 1942
Kondor	Kriegsmarine	Raubvogel	torpedo boat	1,290	15 July 1927	decommissioned 28 June 1944
Kongō	Imperial Japanese Navy	Kongō	battlecruiser	36,600	16 August 1913	sunk 21 November 1944
Königsberg	Kriegsmarine	K	light cruiser	6,650	17 April 1929	sunk 10 April 1940, at Bergen, Norway
Kormoran	Kriegsmarine		auxiliary cruiser	19,900	9 October 1940	scuttled, 19 November 1941
Kortenaer	Royal Netherlands Navy	Admiralen	destroyer	1,680	3 September 1928	sunk 27 February 1942
Kountouriotis	Hellenic Navy	Kountouriotis	destroyer	1,389	1933	decommissioned 1946
Krakowiak	Polish Navy	Hunt	destroyer	1,050	28 May 1941	returned to RN September 1946, scrapped March 1959.
Krasnoye Znamya	Soviet Navy	Krasnoye Znamya	gunboat	1,735	1897	Sunk on 18 November 1942, raised, decommissioned in 1960
Krasny Kavkaz	Soviet Navy	Kraznyi Kavkaz	cruiser	7,560	25 January 1932	Sunk as a target 1956
Krasnyi Krym	Soviet Navy	Krasnyi Krym	cruiser	6,800	1 July 1928	Sunk as target in 1959
Kujawiak	Polish Navy	Hunt	destroyer	1,050	17 June 1941	sunk 16 June 1942
Kula Gulf	United States Navy	Commencement Bay	escort carrier	10,900	12 May 1945	scrapped 1971
Kuma	Imperial Japanese Navy	Kuma	light cruiser	5,550	31 August 1920	10 March 1944, sunk by HMS Tally-Ho west of Penang
Kumano	Imperial Japanese Navy	Mogami	heavy cruiser	13,440	31 October 1931	sunk 15 November 1944
Kumano Maru	Imperial Japanese Army	M Type C	landing craft carrier	8,128	31 March 1945	scrapped 4 November 1947
Kwajalein	United States Navy	Casablanca	escort carrier	7,800	7 June 1944	decommissioned 16 August 1946, scrapped 1961
