= List of ships of World War II (Y) =

The List of ships of the Second World War contains major military vessels of the war, arranged alphabetically and by type. The list includes armed vessels that served during the war and in the immediate aftermath, inclusive of localized ongoing combat operations, garrison surrenders, post-surrender occupation, colony re-occupation, troop and prisoner repatriation, to the end of 1945. For smaller vessels, see also list of World War II ships of less than 1000 tons. Some uncompleted Axis ships are included, out of historic interest. Ships are designated to the country under which they operated for the longest period of the Second World War, regardless of where they were built or previous service history. Submarines show submerged displacement.

Click on headers to sort column alphabetically.

List of ships of World War II (Y)
| Ship | Country or organization | Class | Type | Displacement (tons) | First commissioned | Fate |
|---|---|---|---|---|---|---|
| Yahagi | Imperial Japanese Navy | Agano | light cruiser | 6,650 | 29 December 1943 | Sunk 7 April 1945 |
| Yakov Sverdlov | Soviet Navy | Novik | destroyer | 1,260 | 9 September 1913 | Sunk 28 August 1941 |
| Yakumo | Imperial Japanese Navy | | armored cruiser | 9,646 | 20 June 1900 | Scrapped 1 April 1947 |
| Yamashiro | Imperial Japanese Navy | Fusō | dreadnought | 39,154 | 31 March 1917 | Sunk 25 October 1944 |
| Yamato | Imperial Japanese Navy | Yamato | battleship | 74,170 | 16 December 1941 | Sunk 7 April 1945 |
| Yamashio Maru | Imperial Japanese Army | Special 2TL Type | escort carrier | 16,119 | 27 January 1945 | Sunk 17 February 1945 |
| Yorktown (CV-5) | United States Navy | Yorktown | aircraft carrier | 19,900 | 30 September 1937 | Sunk 7 June 1942 |
| Yorktown (CV-10) | United States Navy | Essex | aircraft carrier | 30,800 | 15 April 1943 | Decommissioned 27 June 1970, museum ship Charleston, South Carolina |
| Yubari | Imperial Japanese Navy | | light cruiser | 2,890 | 23 July 1923 | Sunk 27 April 1944 |
| Yukikaze | Imperial Japanese Navy | Kagero | destroyer | 2,490 | 20 January 1940 | To China 1947, renamed Tan Yang |
| Yura | Imperial Japanese Navy | Nagara | light cruiser | 5,088 | 20 March 1923 | Lost 25 October 1942 |
