= List of ships of World War II (W) =

The List of ships of the Second World War contains major military vessels of the war, arranged alphabetically and by type. The list includes armed vessels that served during the war and in the immediate aftermath, inclusive of localized ongoing combat operations, garrison surrenders, post-surrender occupation, colony re-occupation, troop and prisoner repatriation, to the end of 1945. For smaller vessels, see also list of World War II ships of less than 1000 tons. Some uncompleted Axis ships are included, out of historic interest. Ships are designated to the country under which they operated for the longest period of the Second World War, regardless of where they were built or previous service history. Submarines show submerged displacement.

Click on headers to sort column alphabetically.

List of ships of World War II (W)
Ship	Country or organization	Class	Type	Displacement (tons)	First commissioned	Fate
Wager	Royal Navy	W	destroyer	1,710	14 April 1944	paid off January 1946
Wahoo	United States Navy	Gato	submarine	1,525 surfaced	15 May 1942	Sunk 11 October 1943
Wainwright	United States Navy	Sims	destroyer	1,570	15 April 1940	scuttled after A-bomb test 1948
Wake Island	United States Navy	Casablanca	escort carrier	7,800	7 November 1943	scrapped April 1946
Wakeful	Royal Navy	W	destroyer	1,710	17 February 1944	scrapped 5 July
Walke	United States Navy	Sims	destroyer	1,570	27 April 1940	sunk 15 November 1942
Wallflower	Royal Navy	Flower	corvette	925	7 March 1941	
Ward	United States Navy	Wickes	destroyer	1,190	24 July 1918	Sunk 7 December 1944
Warrior	Royal Navy	Colossus	aircraft carrier	18,300	2 April 1945	paid off 1970, scrapped 1971
Warramunga	Royal Australian Navy	Tribal	destroyer	2,020	23 November 1942	scrapped 1963
Warrington	United States Navy	Somers	destroyer leader	1,850	9 February 1938	foundered in hurricane 13 September 1944
Warspite	Royal Navy	Queen Elizabeth	battleship	31,000	8 March 1915	scrapped 1950
Wasa	Swedish Navy	Äran	coastal defence ship	3,650	1901	paid off 1940, scrapped 1961
Washington	United States Navy	North Carolina	battleship	35,000	15 May 1941	Decommissioned 27 June 1947, scrapped 1960
Waskesiu	Royal Canadian Navy	River	frigate	1,445	16 June 1943	paid off 29 January 1946
Wasp (I)	United States Navy		aircraft carrier	14,700	25 April 1940	sunk 15 September 1942
Wasp (II)	United States Navy	Essex	aircraft carrier	30,800	24 November 1943	decommissioned 1 July 1972
Welles	United States Navy	Gleaves	destroyer	1,630	16 August 1943	decommissioned 1946, scrapped 1969
Welshman	Royal Navy	Abdiel	minelayer	2,650	25 August 1941	sunk 1 February 1943
Wensleydale	Royal Navy	Hunt	destroyer	1,050	20 October 1942	constructive loss 11 December 1944
Wentworth	Royal Canadian Navy	River	frigate	1,445	7 December 1943	paid off 10 October 1945
Wessex	Royal Navy	W	destroyer	1,710	11 May 1944	paid off January 1946
West Virginia	United States Navy	Colorado	battleship	31,500	1 December 1923	Decommissioned 9 January 1947, scrapped 1959
West York	Royal Canadian Navy	Flower modified	corvette	1,015	6 October 1944	9 July 1945
Wetaskiwin	Royal Canadian Navy	Flower	corvette	925	17 December 1940	paid off 19 June 1945
Weyburn	Royal Canadian Navy	Flower	corvette	925	26 November 1941	paid off 22 February 1943
Whaddon	Royal Navy	Hunt	destroyer	1,000	28 February 1941	broken up April 1959
Wheatland	Royal Navy	Hunt	destroyer	1,050	3 November 1941	paid off 19 June 1945, scrapped 20 September 1959
Whelp	Royal Navy	W	destroyer	1,710	25 April 1944	paid off January 1946
Whetstone	United States Navy	Casa Grande	Dock landing ship	7,930	12 February 1946	scrapped 17 February 1983
Whirlwind	Royal Navy	W	destroyer	1,710	1943	foundered 29 October 1974
Whitby	Royal Canadian Navy	Flower modified	corvette	1,015	6 June 1944	16 July 1945
White Marsh	United States Navy	Ashland	Dock landing ship	7,930	29 January 1944	Transferred to Taiwan November 1960
White Plains	United States Navy	Casablanca	escort carrier	7,800	15 November 1943	scrapped 29 July 1958
Wicher	Polish Navy	Wicher	destroyer	1,400	13 July 1930	sunk 3 September 1939
Wichita	United States Navy	Wichita	heavy cruiser	10,000	16 February 1939	decommissioned 1947, scrapped 1959
Widder	Kriegsmarine		auxiliary cruiser	16,800	30 November 1939	became repair ship Neumark 1941
Willem van der Zaan	Royal Netherlands Navy	Willem van der Zaan	minelayer	1,407	21 August 1939	decommissioned 27 February 1970, sold for scrap 6 October 1970
Wiley	United States Navy	Fletcher	destroyer	2,050	22 February 1945	decommissioned 9 August 1946
Wilkes	United States Navy	Gleaves	destroyer	1,630	22 April 1941	decommissioned 1946, scrapped 1972
Wilkes-Barre	United States Navy	Cleveland	light cruiser	11,800	1 July 1944	sunk as target 1972
William D. Porter	United States Navy	Fletcher	destroyer	2,050	6 July 1943	sunk 10 June 1945
Willowherb	Royal Navy	Flower modified	corvette	1,015	30 August 1943	paid off 11 June 1946
Wilson	United States Navy	Benham	destroyer	1,500	5 July 1939	scuttled after A-bomb test 1948
Wilton	Royal Navy	Hunt	destroyer	1,050	18 February 1942	paid off 19 June 1945, scrapped 1959
Windflower	Royal Navy; Royal Canadian Navy	Flower	corvette	925	20 October 1940	to Canada 15 May 1941, sunk 7 December 1941
Windham Bay	United States Navy	Casablanca	escort carrier	7,800	3 May 1944	scrapped February 1961
Windrush	Royal Navy; Free French Naval Forces	River	frigate	1,370	February 1944	to France February 1944 as Découverte; decommissioned 1959
Winslow	United States Navy	Porter	destroyer	1,850	17 February 1937	scrapped 1959
Wisconsin	United States Navy	Iowa	battleship	45,000	16 April 1944	decommissioned 30 September 1991; museum ship
Witte de With	Royal Netherlands Navy	Admiralen	destroyer	1,337	20 February 1930	Scuttled 2 March 1942
Wizard	Royal Navy	W	destroyer	1,710	30 March 1944	scrapped 1967
Wolf	Kriegsmarine	Raubtier	torpedo boat	1,320	15 November 1928	sunk 8 January 1941
Woodruff	Royal Navy	Flower	corvette	925	7 April 1941	
Woodstock	Royal Canadian Navy	Flower	corvette	925	1 May 1942	paid off 27 January 1945
Woodworth	United States Navy	Benson	destroyer	1,620	30 April 1942	to Italy 1951, scrapped 1971
Woolsey	United States Navy	Gleaves	destroyer	1,630	7 May 1941	decommissioned 1947, scrapped 1974
Worden	United States Navy	Farragut	destroyer	1,365	15 January 1935	sunk 12 January 1943
Wrangler	Royal Navy	W	destroyer	1,710	14 July 1944	to South Africa after war
Wrestler	Royal Navy	Admiralty W	destroyer	1,188	15 May 1918	mined 6 June 1944, scrapped July 1944
