= List of ships of World War II (G) =

The List of ships of the Second World War contains major military vessels of the war, arranged alphabetically and by type. The list includes armed vessels that served during the war and in the immediate aftermath, inclusive of localized ongoing combat operations, garrison surrenders, post-surrender occupation, colony re-occupation, troop and prisoner repatriation, to the end of 1945. For smaller vessels, see also list of World War II ships of less than 1000 tons. Some uncompleted Axis ships are included, out of historic interest. Ships are designated to the country under which they operated for the longest period of the Second World War, regardless of where they were built or previous service history. Submarines show submerged displacement.

Click on headers to sort column alphabetically.

List of ships of World War II (G)
Ship	Country or organization	Class	Type	Displacement (tons)	First commissioned	Fate
Gabbard	Royal Navy	Battle	destroyer	2,325	10 December 1946	paid off 1953
Gadila	Netherlands	Rapana	merchant aircraft carrier	8,000	1944	returned to merchant service 1946; scrapped 1958
Gallant	Royal Navy	G	destroyer	1,335	25 February 1936	sunk as a blockship September 1943, scrapped 1953
Galt	Royal Canadian Navy	Flower	corvette	925	15 May 1941	paid off 21 June 1945
Gambia	Royal Navy; Royal New Zealand Navy	Fiji	light cruiser	8,000	21 February 1942	scrapped 1968
Gambier Bay	United States Navy	Casablanca	escort carrier	7,800	28 December 1943	Sunk 25 October 1944
Gamble	United States Navy	Wickes	minelayer destroyer	1,090	29 November 1918	Damaged 17 February 1945, scuttled 16 July 1945.
Gansevoort	United States Navy	Benson	destroyer	1,620	25 August 1942	decommissioned 1946, sunk as target 1972
Gardenia	Royal Navy	Flower	corvette	925	24 May 1940	9 November 1942
Garland	Royal Navy; Polish Navy	G	destroyer	1,335	3 March 1936	to Poland 3 May 1940, paid off 24 September 1946
Garth	Royal Navy	Hunt	destroyer escort	1,000	28 August 1940	scrapped 1958
Gato	United States Navy	Gato	submarine	1,525 surfaced	31 December 1941	Scrapped 25 July 1960
General Belgrano	Argentine Navy	Giuseppe Garibaldi	armored cruiser	6,100	c.1896	Stricken 8 May 1947
General Pueyrredon	Argentine Navy	Giuseppe Garibaldi	armored cruiser	6,100	1897	Stricken 2 August 1954
Genista	Royal Navy	Flower	corvette	925	8 December 1941	
Gentian	Royal Navy	Flower	corvette	925	20 September 1940	
George Leygues	French Navy; Free French Naval Forces	La Galissonnière	light cruiser	7,600	15 November 1937	scrapped 1959
Georgetown	Royal Navy; Royal Canadian Navy; Soviet Navy	Town	destroyer	1,200	23 September 1940	to Canada September 1942, to USSR as Doblestny 10 August 1944
Georgios Averof	Hellenic Navy	Pisa	armored cruiser	9,450	16 May 1911	Decommissioned 1952, museum ship
Geranium	Royal Navy	Flower	corvette	925	24 June 1940	
Gherardi	United States Navy	Gleaves	destroyer	1,630	15 September 1942	decommissioned 1955, sunk as target 1973
Giffard	Royal Canadian Navy	Flower modified	corvette	1,015	10 November 1943	5 July 1945
Gilbert Islands	United States Navy	Commencement Bay	escort carrier	10,900	5 February 1945	scrapped 1 November 1979
Gillespie	United States Navy	Benson	destroyer	1,620	18 September 1942	decommissioned 1946, sunk as target 1973
Giovanni dalle Bande Nere	Regia Marina	Giussano	light cruiser	5,200	10 February 1932	Sunk 19 July 1940
Gipsy	Royal Navy	G	destroyer	1,350	22 February 1936	sunk 21 November 1939
Giulio Cesare	Regia Marina	Conte di Cavour	dreadnought	26,140	10 May 1914	Ceded to Soviet Union 1948, renamed Novorossiysk
Giuseppe Garibaldi	Regia Marina	Duca degli Abruzzi	light cruiser	9,195	1937	scrapped 1972
Giuseppe Miraglia	Regia Marina		seaplane tender	4,965	1927	decommissioned 15 July 1950
Glace Bay	Royal Canadian Navy	River	frigate	1,445	2 September 1944	paid off 17 November 1945
Gladiolus	Royal Navy	Flower	corvette	925	6 April 1940	sunk on 17 October 1941 by U-553
Glaisdale	Royal Navy	Hunt	destroyer escort	1,050	12 June 1942	to Norway after war, scrapped 1961
Gleaves	United States Navy	Gleaves	destroyer	1,630	14 June 1940	Sold 29 June 1972 and broken up for scrap
Glennon	United States Navy	Gleaves	destroyer	1,630	8 October 1942	sunk 10 June 1944
Gloire	French Navy; Free French Naval Forces	La Galissonnière	light cruiser	7,600	15 November 1937	scrapped 1958
Gloriosa	Royal Navy	Flower	corvette	925		Cancelled, 23 January 1941
Glorious	Royal Navy	Glorious	aircraft carrier	22,500	20 April 1916	sunk 8 June 1940
Glory	Royal Navy	Colossus	aircraft carrier	13,200	2 April 1945	scrapped August 1961
Gloucester	Royal Navy	Town	light cruiser	9,400	31 January 1939	Sunk on 22 May 1941 during the Battle of Crete
Glowworm	Royal Navy	G	destroyer	1,350	22 January 1936	sunk 8 April 1940
Gloxinia	Royal Navy	Flower	corvette	925	22 August 1940	
Gneisenau	Kriegsmarine	Scharnhorst	battleship	32,000	21 May 1938	sunk as block ship March 1945
Goathland	Royal Navy	Hunt	destroyer escort	1,050		constructive loss July 1944
Godavari	Royal Indian Navy	Black Swan	sloop	1,350	28 June 1943	1948
Godetia (I)	Royal Navy	Flower	corvette	925	15 July 1940	sunk in collision 6 September 1940
Godetia (II)	Royal Navy	Flower	corvette	925	23 February 1942	
Goldsborough	United States Navy	Clemson	destroyer	1,250	26 January 1920	Decommissioned 11 October 1945
Good Hope	South African Navy	Loch	frigate	1,435	1 December 1944	scrapped June 1978
Goodall	Royal Navy	Captain	frigate	1,150	4 October 1943	sunk 29 April 1945
Gorizia	Regia Marina	Zara	heavy cruiser	11,900	1931	sunk 1943
Gouden Leeuw	Royal Netherlands Navy	Prins van Oranje	minelayer	1,291	24 February 1932	scuttled 7 March 1942
Graf Zeppelin	Kriegsmarine	Graf Zeppelin	aircraft carrier	23,200		launched 8 December 1938, not completed, scuttled 16 August 1947
Grafton	Royal Navy	G	destroyer	1,350	20 March 1936	scuttled after torpedo attack by U-62 on 29 May 1940
Graph	Kriegsmarine; Royal Navy	Type VIIC	submarine	769	launched 15 April 1941	German U-boat, captured by the British, 27 August 1941. Ran aground September 1944
Gravelines	Royal Navy	Battle	destroyer	2,325	14 June 1946	paid off March 1953
Grayson	United States Navy	Gleaves	destroyer	1,630	14 February 1941	decommissioned 1947, scrapped 1974
Greenhalgh	Brazilian Navy	Marcílio Dias	destroyer	1,500	29 November 1943	decommissioned 1966
Greif	Kriegsmarine	Raubvogel	torpedo boat	1,290	15 March 1927	sunk 23 May 1944
Grenade	Royal Navy	G	destroyer	1,350	28 March 1936	sunk 29 May 1940
Grenville (I)	Royal Navy	G	destroyer	1,350	1 July 1936	sunk 19 January 1940
Grenville (II)	Royal Navy	U	destroyer	1,777	27 May 1943	paid off 1974, scrapped 1983
Greyhound	Royal Navy	G	destroyer	1,350	1 February 1936	sunk 22 May 1941
Gridley	United States Navy	Gridley	destroyer	1,590	24 June 1937	scrapped 1947
Griffin	Royal Navy; Royal Canadian Navy	G	destroyer	1,350	6 June 1936	to Canada 1 March 1943 as Ottawa, paid off May 1945
Grom	Polish Navy	Grom	destroyer	1,975	11 May 1937	sunk 4 May 1940
Grou	Royal Canadian Navy	River	frigate	1,445	4 December 1943	paid off 25 December 1946
Grove	Royal Navy	Hunt	destroyer escort	1,050	5 February 1942	sunk 12 June 1942
Gryf	Polish Navy	Gryf	minelayer	2,085	27 February 1938	sunk 3 September 1939
Guacolda	Chilean Navy	H	submarine	441	1917	scrapped 1949
Guadalcanal	United States Navy	Casablanca	escort carrier	7,800	25 September 1943	decommissioned 15 July 1946, scrapped 1959
Guale	Chilean Navy	H	submarine	441	1917	scrapped 1945
Guam	United States Navy	Alaska	battlecruiser ("large cruiser")	27,500	17 September 1944	scrapped August 1961
Guelph	Royal Canadian Navy	Flower modified	corvette	1,015	9 May 1944	27 June 1945
Gunston Hall	United States Navy	Ashland	Dock landing ship	7,930	9 December 1943	Stricken 1 December 1967
Gurkha (I)	Royal Navy	Tribal	destroyer	2,020	21 October 1938	sunk 9 April 1940
Gurkha (II)	Royal Navy	L	destroyer	1,920	18 February 1941	sunk 17 January 1942
Gustav V	Swedish Navy	Sverige	coastal defence ship	7,125	12 December 1922	paid off 22 March 1957, scrapped 1970
Gwin	United States Navy	Gleaves	destroyer	1,630	15 January 1941	sunk 13 July 1943
