= List of ships of World War II (E) =

The List of ships of the Second World War contains major military vessels of the war, arranged alphabetically and by type. The list includes armed vessels that served during the war and in the immediate aftermath, inclusive of localized ongoing combat operations, garrison surrenders, post-surrender occupation, colony re-occupation, troop and prisoner repatriation, to the end of 1945. For smaller vessels, see also list of World War II ships of less than 1000 tons. Some uncompleted Axis ships are included, out of historic interest. Ships are designated to the country under which they operated for the longest period of the Second World War, regardless of where they were built or previous service history. Submarines show submerged displacement.

Click on headers to sort column alphabetically.

List of ships of World War II (E)
| Ship | Country or organization | Class | Type | Displacement (tons) | First commissioned | Fate |
|---|---|---|---|---|---|---|
| Eagle | Royal Navy | | aircraft carrier | 22,600 | 26 February 1924 | sunk 11 August 1942 |
| Earle | United States Navy | Gleaves | destroyer | 1,630 | 1 September 1942 | decommissioned 1947, scrapped 1970 |
| Eastview | Royal Canadian Navy | River | frigate | 1,445 | 3 June 1944 | paid off 17 January 1946 |
| Eastway | Royal Navy | Casa Grande | Dock landing ship | 7,930 | 14 November 1943 | Transferred to Greece, 1953 |
| Eberle | United States Navy | Gleaves | destroyer | 1,630 | 4 December 1940 | Transferred to Greece, 22 January 1951, scrapped 1972 |
| Echo | Royal Navy; Hellenic Navy | E | destroyer | 1,405 | 22 October 1934 | to Greece as Navarion 5 April 1944, scrapped April 1956 |
| Edgehill | Royal Navy | | Special Service Ship | 4,702 | | sunk 29 June 1940 |
| Edinburgh | Royal Navy | Town | light cruiser | 11,500 | 6 July 1939 | lost 2 May 1942 |
| Edison | United States Navy | Gleaves | destroyer | 1,630 | 31 January 1941 | decommissioned 1946, scrapped 1966 |
| Edmundston | Royal Canadian Navy | Flower | corvette | 925 | 21 October 1941 | paid off 16 June 1945 |
| Edwards | United States Navy | Gleaves | destroyer | 1,630 | 18 September 1942 | decommissioned 1946, scrapped 1973 |
| Effingham | Royal Navy | Hawkins | heavy cruiser | 9,750 | 2 July 1925 | wrecked 18 May 1940 |
| Eggesford | Royal Navy | Hunt | destroyer escort | 1,050 | 21 January 1943 | paid off 1946 |
| Eglantine | Royal Norwegian Navy | Flower | corvette | 925 | 29 August 1941 | scrapped June 1969 |
| Eglinton | Royal Navy | Hunt | destroyer escort | 1,000 | 28 August 1940 | paid off 1945, scrapped 1956 |
| Eidsvold | Royal Norwegian Navy | Eidsvold | coastal defence ship | 4,233 | 1 March 1901 | sunk 9 April 1940 |
| El Amir Farouq | Egyptian Navy | | patrol vessel | 1,441 | 1936 | sunk 22 October 1948 |
| El Dorado | United States Navy | Mount McKinley | amphibious command ship | 7,350 | 25 August 1944 | Decommissioned 8 November 1972, scrapped 1976 |
| Ellet | United States Navy | Benham | destroyer | 1,500 | 17 February 1939 | scrapped 1947 |
| Elli | Hellenic Navy | Chao Ho | protected cruiser | 2,115 | November 1913 | sunk 15 August 1940 |
| Ellyson | United States Navy | Gleaves | destroyer | 1,630 | 28 November 1941 | to Japan 1954, scrapped 1970 |
| Emanuele Filiberto Duca d'Aosta | Regia Marina | Duca d'Aosta | light cruiser | 8,450 | 13 July 1935 | ceded to USSR 1949, renamed Kerch, scrapped in 1960s |
| Emden | Kriegsmarine | | light cruiser | 5,600 | October 1925 | scuttled 3 May 1945 |
| Emerald | Royal Navy | Emerald | light cruiser | 7,580 | 14 January 1926 | scrapped July 1948 |
| Émile Bertin | French Navy; Free French Naval Forces | | light cruiser | 5,886 | 28 January 1935 | scrapped 1959 |
| Emmons | United States Navy | Gleaves | destroyer | 1,630 | 5 December 1941 | sunk 6 April 1945 |
| Emperor | Royal Navy | Ruler | escort carrier | 11,400 | 6 August 1943 | paid off 28 March 1946, scrapped 1946 |
| Empire Activity | Royal Navy | Empire | merchant aircraft carrier | 14,250 | 29 September 1942 | 20 October 1945 |
| Empire Audacity | Royal Navy | Empire | merchant aircraft carrier | 11,000 | 20 June 1941 | Sunk 21 December 1941 |
| Empire MacAlpine | Royal Navy | Empire | merchant aircraft carrier | 8,000 | 14 April 1943 | transferred to merchant service post-war; renamed Derryname |
| Empire MacAndrew | Royal Navy | Empire | merchant aircraft carrier | 8,000 | 7 July 1943 | transferred to merchant service post-war; renamed Derryheen |
| Empire MacCabe | Royal Navy | Empire | merchant aircraft carrier | 9,000 | November 1943 | Transferred to merchant service 1946, renamed British Escort |
| Empire MacCallum | Royal Navy | Empire | merchant aircraft carrier | 8,000 | 22 December 1943 | transferred to merchant service post-war; renamed Alpha Zambesi |
| Empire MacColl | Royal Navy | Empire | merchant aircraft carrier | 9,000 | November 1943 | Transferred to merchant service 1946, renamed British Pilot |
| Empire MacDermott | Royal Navy | Empire | merchant aircraft carrier | 8,000 | 31 March 1944 | transferred to merchant service post-war; renamed La Cumbre |
| Empire MacKay | Royal Navy | Empire | merchant aircraft carrier | 9,000 | 5 October 1943 | Transferred to merchant service 1946, renamed British Swordfish |
| Empire MacKendrick | Royal Navy | Empire | merchant aircraft carrier | 8,000 | December 1943 | transferred to merchant service post-war; renamed Granpond |
| Empire MacMahon | Royal Navy | Empire | merchant aircraft carrier | 9,000 | December 1943 | Transferred to merchant service 1946, renamed Naninia |
| Empire MacRae | Royal Navy | Empire | merchant aircraft carrier | 8,000 | 20 September 1943 | Returned to merchant service 1947, renamed Alpha Zambesi |
| Empress | Royal Navy | Ruler | escort carrier | 7,800 | 9 August 1943 | paid off 28 March 1946, scrapped 1946 |
| Endicott | United States Navy | Gleaves | destroyer | 1,630 | 25 February 1943 | decommissioned 1955, scrapped 1970 |
| England | United States Navy | Buckley | destroyer escort | 1,400 | 10 December 1943 | sold and broken up, 26 November 1946 |
| Enterprise | Royal Navy | Emerald | light cruiser | 7,580 | 7 April 1926 | scrapped April 1946 |
| Enterprise | United States Navy | Yorktown | aircraft carrier | 25,100 | 12 May 1938 | decommissioned 1947, scrapped 1959 |
| Entre Rios | Argentine Navy | Buenos Aires | destroyer | 1,375 | | |
| Epping Forest | United States Navy | Ashland | Dock landing ship | 7,930 | 10 November 1943 | Transferred to Argentina, 1970 |
| Erebus | Royal Navy | Erebus | monitor | 8,000 | 2 September 1916 | Scrapped July 1946 |
| Erica | Royal Navy | Flower | corvette | 925 | 9 August 1940 | sunk 9 February 1943 |
| Ericsson | United States Navy | Gleaves | destroyer | 1,630 | 13 March 1941 | decommissioned 1946, sunk as target 1970 |
| Eridge | Royal Navy | Hunt | destroyer escort | 1,050 | 28 February 1941 | scrapped 1946 |
| Eritrea | Regia Marina | | sloop | 2,200 | 1937 | ceded to France 1948, renamed Francis Garnier, expended as target 1966 |
| Eskdale | Royal Norwegian Navy | Hunt | destroyer escort | 1,050 | 31 July 1942 | sunk 14 April 1943 |
| Eskimo | Royal Navy | Tribal | destroyer | 2,020 | 30 December 1938 | scrapped 1949 |
| Essex | United States Navy | Essex | aircraft carrier | 30,800 | 31 December 1942 | decommissioned 30 June 1969, scrapped 1975 |
| Ettrick | Royal Navy; Royal Canadian Navy | River | frigate | 1,445 | 11 July 1943 | to Canada 29 January 1944, paid off 30 May 1945 |
| Eugenio di Savoia | Regia Marina | Duca d'Aosta | light cruiser | 8,750 | 16 January 1936 | ceded to Greece 1950, renamed Elli, scrapped 1973 |
| Evertsen | Netherlands | Admiralen | destroyer | 1,337 | 12 April 1928 | Destroyed, 1 March 1942 |
| Exeter | Royal Navy | York | heavy cruiser | 8,390 | 23 July 1931 | sunk 1 March 1942 |
| Exmoor (I) | Royal Navy | Hunt | destroyer escort | 1,000 | 18 October 1940 | sunk by E-boat S-30, 25 February 1941 |
| Exmoor (II) | Royal Navy | Hunt | destroyer escort | 1,050 | 18 October 1941 | November 1945 |
| Explorer | United States Coast and Geodetic Survey | | survey ship | 1,800 | Spring 1940 | decommissioned 1968 |
| Express | Royal Navy; Royal Canadian Navy | E | destroyer | 1,405 | 29 May 1934 | Transferred to RCN June 1943 as Gatineau, paid off 1955 |
| Eyebright | Royal Navy; Royal Canadian Navy | Flower | corvette | 925 | 26 November 1940 | to Canada 15 May 1941, paid off 17 June 1945 |
