= Lists of ships of World War II =

This list of ships of the Second World War contains major military vessels of the war, arranged alphabetically and by type. The list includes armed vessels that served during the war and in the immediate aftermath, inclusive of localized ongoing combat operations, garrison surrenders, post-surrender occupation, colony re-occupation, troop and prisoner repatriation, to the end of 1945. For smaller vessels, see also list of World War II ships of less than 1000 tons. Some uncompleted Axis ships are included, out of historic interest. Ships are designated to the country under which they operated for the longest period of the Second World War, regardless of where they were built or previous service history.

Naval warfare changed dramatically during the war, with the ascent of the aircraft carrier, and the impact of increasingly capable submarines. Destroyers saw dramatic improvements, as the Fubuki-class destroyer set a new standard not only for Japanese vessels, but for navies around the world, and are considered to be the world's first modern destroyer. Submarines were critical in the Pacific and Atlantic theatres. Advances in submarine technology included the snorkel, though advanced German submarine types came into service too late to impact the war effort. The German Kriegsmarine also introduced the pocket battleship, to get around constraints imposed by the Treaty of Versailles.

Naval innovations included the use of diesel engines and welded rather than riveted hulls. But the most important naval advances were in the field of anti-submarine warfare. Driven by the desperate necessity of keeping Britain and Japan supplied by sea, technologies for the detection and destruction of submarines were a high priority. While Japanese efforts proved futile, the Allied use of ASDIC (SONAR) became widespread as did the installation of shipboard and airborne radar. The construction and launch of new ships during the war was limited due to protracted development and production timelines, but important developments were often retrofitted to older vessels.

== Alphabetical list of ships ==
This list is broken up alphabetically, and is sorted into several subpages:

- List of ships of World War II (A)
- List of ships of World War II (B)
- List of ships of World War II (C)
- List of ships of World War II (D)
- List of ships of World War II (E)
- List of ships of World War II (F)
- List of ships of World War II (G)
- List of ships of World War II (H)
- List of ships of World War II (I)
- List of ships of World War II (J)
- List of ships of World War II (K)
- List of ships of World War II (L)
- List of ships of World War II (M)
- List of ships of World War II (N)
- List of ships of World War II (O)
- List of ships of World War II (P)
- List of ships of World War II (Q)
- List of ships of World War II (R)
- List of ships of World War II (S)
- List of ships of World War II (T)
- List of ships of World War II (U)
- List of ships of World War II (V)
- List of ships of World War II (W)
- List of ships of World War II (X)
- List of ships of World War II (Y)
- List of ships of World War II (Z)

== List of ships by type ==
This list is also available by ship type, sorted into these subpages:

- List of aircraft carriers of World War II
- List of amphibious warfare vessels of World War II
- List of battleships of World War II
- List of destroyers of World War II
- List of mine warfare vessels of World War II
- List of corvettes of World War II
- List of auxiliary ships of World War II

This list is also condensed with ship classes only:

- List of ship classes of World War II

== Bibliography ==
- Ader, Clement (2003). Military Aviation, 1909. Edited and translated by Lee Kennett. Maxwell Air Force Base, Alabama: Air University Press. ISBN 978-1-58566-118-3.
- Colledge, J. J.; Warlow, Ben (2006) [1969]. Ships of the Royal Navy: The Complete Record of All Fighting Ships of the Royal Navy from the 15th Century to the Present (3rd Rev ed.). London: Chatham Publishing. ISBN 978-1-86176-281-8. OCLC 67375475.
- Collins, J.T.E. (1964). The Royal Indian Navy, 1939–1945. Official History of the Indian Armed Forces in the Second World War. New Delhi: Combined Inter-Services Historical Section (India & Pakistan).
- Francillon, René J. (1988). Tonkin Gulf Yacht Club: US Carrier Operations off Vietnam. Annapolis, Maryland: Naval Institute Press. ISBN 978-0-87021-696-1.
- Friedman, Norman (1983). U.S. Aircraft Carriers: An Illustrated Design History. Annapolis, Maryland: Naval Institute Press. ISBN 978-0-87021-739-5.
- Hone, Thomas C.; Friedman, Norman & Mandeles, Mark D. (2011). "Innovation in Carrier Aviation". Naval War College Newport Papers (37): 1–171.
- Mark, Chris (1997). Schepen van de Koninklijke Marine in W.O.II (in Dutch). Alkmaar: Uitgeverij De Alk B.V. ISBN 90-6013-522-9.
- Melhorn, Charles M. (1974). Two-Block Fox: The Rise of the Aircraft Carrier, 1911–1929. Annapolis, Maryland: Naval Institute Press.
- Nordeen, Lon O. (1985). Air Warfare in the Missile Age. Washington, D.C.: Smithsonian Institution Press. ISBN 978-1-58834-083-2.
- Polak, Christian (2005). Sabre et Pinceau: Par d'autres Français au Japon (1872–1960) (in French and Japanese). Hiroshi Ueki (植木 浩), Philippe Pons, foreword; 筆と刀・日本の中のもうひとつのフランス (1872–1960). éd. L'Harmattan.
- Sturtivant, Ray (1990). British Naval Aviation, The Fleet Air Arm, 1917–1990. London, UK: Arms & Armour Press. ISBN 0-85368-938-5.
- Till, Geoffrey (1996). "Adopting the Aircraft Carrier: The British, Japanese, and American Case Studies". In Murray, Williamson; Millet, Allan R. (eds.). Military Innovation in the Interwar Period. Cambridge, UK: Cambridge University Press. ISBN 978-0-5215-5241-7.
- Trimble, William F. (1994). Admiral William A. Moffett: Architect of Naval Aviation. Washington, D.C.: Smithsonian Institution Press. ISBN 978-1-5609-8320-0.
- Wadle, Ryan David (2005). United States Navy fleet problems and the development of carrier aviation, 1929–1933 (PDF) (PhD). Texas A&M University. Archived from the original (PDF) on 26 May 2015.
- Whitley, M. J. (2000). Destroyers of World War Two: An International Encyclopedia. London: Arms and Armour Press. ISBN 1-85409-521-8.
- Whitley, M. J. (1995). Cruisers of World War Two: An International Encyclopedia. London: Arms and Armour Press. ISBN 1-85409-225-1.
- Wise, James E. Jr. (1974). "Catapult Off – Parachute Back". Proceedings. Annapolis, Maryland: United States Naval Institute.
- Helgason, Guðmundur (1995–2007). "Allied Warships". Uboat.net.
- "Battleships-Cruisers.co.uk". Cranston Fine Arts. 2001–2007.
- "NavSource Naval History".
