= List of ships of World War II (L) =

The List of ships of the Second World War contains major military vessels of the war, arranged alphabetically and by type. The list includes armed vessels that served during the war and in the immediate aftermath, inclusive of localized ongoing combat operations, garrison surrenders, post-surrender occupation, colony re-occupation, troop and prisoner repatriation, to the end of 1945. For smaller vessels, see also list of World War II ships of less than 1000 tons. Some uncompleted Axis ships are included, out of historic interest. Ships are designated to the country under which they operated for the longest period of the Second World War, regardless of where they were built or previous service history. Submarines show submerged displacement.

Click on headers to sort column alphabetically.

List of ships of World War II (L)
Ship	Country or organization	Class	Type	Displacement (tons)	First commissioned	Fate
L23	Royal Navy	L	submarine	1,106	31 October 1924	paid off May 1946
L26	Royal Navy	L	submarine	1,106	11 October 1926	sunk as target 1 November 1946
L27	Royal Navy	L	training submarine	1,106		scrapped 1944
La Argentina	Argentine Navy		training light cruiser	6,500	April 1939	discarded 1974
La Bastiaise	French Navy	Flower	corvette	925	22 June 1940	sunk 22 June 1940
La Galissonnière	French Navy	La Galissonnière	light cruiser	7,600	1 January 1936	scuttled 27 November 1942
La Hulloise	Royal Canadian Navy	River	frigate	1,445	6 December 1945	paid off 16 July 1965
La Malbaie	Royal Canadian Navy	Flower	corvette	925	28 April 1942	paid off 28 June 1945
La Malouine	Royal Navy	Flower	corvette	925	29 July 1940	
La Rioja	Argentine Navy	Mendoza	destroyer	1,570	23 July 1929	30 April 1962
Lachute	Royal Canadian Navy	Flower modified	corvette	1,015	26 October 1944	10 July 1945
Laffey (I)	United States Navy	Benson	destroyer	1,620	31 March 1942	sunk 13 November 1942
Laffey (II)	United States Navy	Sumner	destroyer	2,200	8 February 1944	decommissioned 1975, memorial at Charleston, SC
Laforey	Royal Navy	L	destroyer	1,920	26 August 1941	sunk 30 March 1944 by U-223
Lagos	Royal Navy	Battle	destroyer	2,325	2 November 1945	paid off 1960, scrapped 1967
Lahore	Royal Indian Navy	Basset	minesweeper	529	1941–1944	1941–1944
Lake Champlain	United States Navy	Ticonderoga	aircraft carrier	27,100	3 June 1945	decommissioned 2 May 1966, scrapped 1972
Lamberton	United States Navy	Wickes	minesweeper destroyer	1,090	22 August 1918	scrapped 9 May 1947
Lambridge	Royal Navy		Special Service Ship	5,119		paid off March 1941
Lamerton	Royal Navy	Hunt	destroyer	1,000	16 August 1941	scrapped 1975
Lamotte-Piquet	French Navy	Duguay-Trouin	light cruiser	7,249	5 March 1927	sunk 12 January 1945
Lamson	United States Navy	Mahan	destroyer	1,450	21 October 1936	sunk in A-bomb test, 1946
Lanark	Royal Canadian Navy	River	frigate	1,445	6 July 1944	paid off 19 March 1965
Lance	Royal Navy	L	destroyer	1,920	13 May 1941	constructive loss and scrapped April 1942
Lang	United States Navy	Benham	destroyer	1,500	30 March 1939	scrapped 1947
Langley	United States Navy		Seaplane carrier	11,500	7 April 1913	sunk 27 February 1942
Langley	United States Navy	Independence	light aircraft carrier	11,000	31 August 1943	decommissioned 11 February 1947, scrapped 1964
Lansdale	United States Navy	Benson	destroyer	1,620	17 September 1940	sunk 20 April 1944
Lansdowne	United States Navy	Gleaves	destroyer	1,630	29 April 1942	to Turkey 1949, scrapped 1973
Lardner	United States Navy	Gleaves	destroyer	1,630	13 May 1942	to Turkey 1949, sunk as target 1982
Larkspur	Royal Navy; United States Navy	Flower	corvette	925	4 June 1940	to USA as Fury 17 March 1942, to UK on 22 August 1945
Lasalle	Royal Canadian Navy	River	frigate	1,445	29 June 1944	paid off 17 December 1945
Latona	Royal Navy	Abdiel	minelayer	2,650	4 May 1941	lost 25 October 1941
Laub	United States Navy	Benson	destroyer	1,620	24 October 1942	decommissioned 1946, scrapped 1975
Lauderdale	Royal Navy	Hunt	destroyer	1,050	August 1942	paid off 1946, scrapped 1960
Lauzon	Royal Canadian Navy	River	frigate	1,445	30 August 1944	paid off 24 May 1963
Lavender	Royal Navy	Flower	corvette	925	16 May 1941	
Lawford	Royal Navy	Captain	frigate	1,140	3 November 1943	sunk 8 June 1944
Lawrence	Royal Indian Navy		sloop	1,245	27 December 1919	1947
Leamington	Royal Navy; Royal Canadian Navy; Soviet Navy	Town	destroyer	1,327	23 October 1940	to Canada October 1942, to USSR 16 July 1944
Leander	Royal New Zealand Navy	Leander	light cruiser	6,985	23 July 1931	former HMS Leander, to NZ April 1937, returned to UK May 1944, scrapped 1950
Ledbury	Royal Navy	Hunt	destroyer	1,050		scrapped April 1958
Leeds	Royal Navy	Town	destroyer	1,125	12 January 1918	paid off April 1945
Legion	Royal Navy	L	destroyer	1,920	19 December 1940	sunk 26 March 1942
Leipzig	Kriegsmarine	Leipzig	light cruiser	6,515	8 October 1931	scuttled 11 July 1946
Leningrad	Soviet Navy	Leningrad	destroyer	2,150	December 1936	scrapped in 1960
Leon	Hellenic Navy	Aetos	destroyer	1,030	19 October 1912	sunk 15 May 1941
Leopard	Kriegsmarine	Raubtier	torpedo boat	1,320	1 June 1928	sunk on 30 April 1940
Léopard	Free French Naval Forces	Chacal	destroyer	2,126	31 August 1940	sunk 27 May 1943
Lethbridge	Royal Canadian Navy	Flower	corvette	925	25 June 1941	paid off 23 July 1945
Levis (I)	Royal Canadian Navy	Flower	corvette	925	16 May 1941	sunk 19 September 1941 by U-74
Levis (II)	Royal Canadian Navy	River	frigate	1,445	21 July 1944	paid off 21 February 1946
Lewes	Royal Navy	Town	destroyer	1,125	23 October 1940	scuttled 25 May 1946
Lexington (I)	United States Navy	Lexington	aircraft carrier	33,000	14 December 1927	sunk 8 May 1942
Lexington (II)	United States Navy	Essex	aircraft carrier	27,100	17 February 1943	decommissioned 8 November 1991; museum ship
ARA Libertad	Argentine Navy	Libertad	riverine battleship	2,336	26 November 1892	paid off 1947
Liddesdale	Royal Navy	Hunt	destroyer	1,000	28 February 1941	Scrapped 1948
Lightning	Royal Navy	L	destroyer	1,920	28 May 1941	sunk 12 March 1943
Limbourne	Royal Navy	Hunt	destroyer	1,050	24 October 1942	sunk 23 October 1943
Linaria	Royal Navy	Flower modified	corvette	1,015	19 June 1943	paid off 15 January 1948
Lincoln	Royal Navy; Royal Norwegian Navy; Royal Canadian Navy; Soviet Navy	Town	destroyer	1,190	20 October 1940	to Norway February 1942, Canada July 1942-December 1943, Soviet Union August 1944, scrapped 1952
Lindenwald	United States Navy	Ashland	Dock landing ship	7,930	5 January 1944	Stricken 31 October 1969
Lindsay	Royal Canadian Navy	Flower modified	corvette	1,015	15 November 1943	18 July 1945
Ling	Royal Navy	Flower	corvette	925		cancelled 23 January 1941
Liscome Bay	United States Navy	Casablanca	escort carrier	7,800	7 August 1943	lost in action 24 November 1943
Littorio	Regia Marina	Littorio	battleship	43,835	6 May 1940	renamed Italia, scrapped 1948
Lively	Royal Navy	L	destroyer	1,920	20 July 1941	sunk 11 May 1942
Livermore	United States Navy	Gleaves	destroyer	1,630	7 October 1940	Sold 3 March 1961 for scrapping
Lobelia	Free French Naval Forces	Flower	corvette	925	16 July 1941	April 1947
Loch Achanalt	Royal Canadian Navy	Loch	frigate	1,435	31 July 1944	paid off July 1945, transferred to the Royal New Zealand Navy in 1945, scrapped in 1965
Loch Alvie	Royal Canadian Navy	Loch	frigate	1,435	10 August 1944	paid off June 1945, transferred to the Royal Navy in 1945, scrapped in 1965
Loch Insh	Royal Navy	Loch	frigate	1,435	20 October 1944	scrapped in 1977
Loch Morlich	Royal Canadian Navy	Loch	frigate	1,435	17 July 1944	paid off June 1945, scrapped in 1966
London	Royal Navy	County	heavy cruiser	9,850	31 January 1929	scrapped 1950
Long Branch	Royal Canadian Navy	Flower modified	corvette	1,015	5 January 1944	17 June 1945
Long Island	United States Navy	Long Island	escort carrier	13,500	2 June 1941	decommissioned 26 March 1946
Longueuil	Royal Canadian Navy	River	frigate	1,445	18 May 1944	paid off 31 December 1946
Looe	Royal Navy		Special Service Ship	1,030		paid off March 1941
Lookout	Royal Navy	L	destroyer	1,920	30 January 1942	paid off 19 October 1945, scrapped February 1948
Loosestrife	Royal Navy	Flower	corvette	925	25 November 1941	Sold, 7 October 1946
Lorelei	Kriegsmarine		patrol boat	1,640	25 April 1943	former Artevelde (Belgium), later K4, scrapped 1954
Lorraine	French Navy; Free French Naval Forces	Bretagne	super dreadnought	22,200	27 July 1916	Decommissioned 17 February 1953
Los Angeles	United States Navy	Baltimore	heavy cruiser	17,200	22 July 1945	scrapped 1974
Lothringen	Kriegsmarine		minelayer	1,975	December 1941	sold to merchant service post-war
Lotus	Royal Navy	Flower	corvette	925	23 May 1942	
Louisburg (I)	Royal Canadian Navy	Flower	corvette	925	2 October 1941	sunk on 6 February 1943 by Luftwaffe aircraft
Louisburg (II)	Royal Canadian Navy	Flower modified	corvette	1,015	13 December 1943	25 June 1945
Louisville	United States Navy	Northampton	heavy cruiser	9,200	15 January 1931	scrapped 1959
Loyal	Royal Navy	L	destroyer	1,920	31 October 1942	constructive loss 12 October 1944, scrapped 1948
Luchs	Kriegsmarine	Raubtier	torpedo boat	1,320	15 April 1929	sunk 26 July 1940
Lucknow	Royal Indian Navy	Basset	minesweeper	529	1941–1944	1941–1944
Ludlow	United States Navy	Gleaves	destroyer	1,630	5 March 1941	to Greece 1951, scrapped 1972
Luigi Cadorna	Regia Marina	Condottieri	light cruiser	5,316	11 August 1933	scrapped 1951
Luigi Di Savoia Duca Degli Abruzzi	Regia Marina	Condottieri	light cruiser	9,952	1 December 1937	scrapped 1972
Lunenburg	Royal Canadian Navy	Flower	corvette	925	4 December 1941	paid off 23 July 1945
Lunga Point	United States Navy	Casablanca	escort carrier	7,800	14 May 1944	decommissioned 24 October 1946, scrapped 1960
Lützow	Kriegsmarine	enlarged Admiral Hipper	heavy cruiser	14,680	not completed	sold to USSR 1940 became Petropavlovsk, then Tallinn
