= List of ships of World War II (U) =

List of ships starting with the letter U (all countries)

The List of ships of the Second World War contains major military vessels of the war, arranged alphabetically and by type. The list includes armed vessels that served during the war and in the immediate aftermath, inclusive of localized ongoing combat operations, garrison surrenders, post-surrender occupation, colony re-occupation, troop and prisoner repatriation, to the end of 1945. For smaller vessels, see also list of World War II ships of less than 1000 tons. Some uncompleted Axis ships are included, out of historic interest. Ships are designated to the country under which they operated for the longest period of the Second World War, regardless of where they were built or previous service history. Submarines show submerged displacement.

Click on headers to sort column alphabetically.

List of ships of World War II (U)
Ship	Country or organization	Class	Type	Displacement (tons)	First commissioned	Fate
U-25	Kriegsmarine	Type IA	submarine	982	6 April 1936	Sunk 1 August 1940
U-37 – U-44	Kriegsmarine	Type IX	submarine	1,152		
U-65, U-66 U-103 – U-111 U-122 – U-124	Kriegsmarine	Type IXB	submarine	1,178		
U-66 – U-68 U-125 – U-131 U-153 – U-166 U-171 – U-176 U-501 – U-524	Kriegsmarine	Type IXC	submarine	1,232		
U-167 – U-170 U-183 – U-194 U-525 – U-550 U-801 – U-806 U-841 – U-846 U-853 – U-858 U-865 – U-870 U-877 – U-881 U-1221 – U-1235	Kriegsmarine	Type IXC/40	submarine	1,257		U-877 was sunk by HMCS St. Thomas on 27 December 1944. All 56 members of the crew were saved.
U-190	Kriegsmarine; Royal Canadian Navy	Type IXC/40	submarine	1,257	24 September 1942	Surrendered to RCN 11 May 1945, commissioned 19 May, paid off 24 July 1947, scuttled October 21, 1947
U-889	Kriegsmarine; Royal Canadian Navy	Type IXC/40	submarine	1,257	4 August 1944	Surrendered to RCN 10 May 1945, commissioned 14 May, paid off December 1945, scuttled 1947
U-177 – U-182 U-195 – U-200 U-847 – U-852 U-859 – U-864 U-871 – U-876	Kriegsmarine	Type IXD	submarine	1,799		
U-459 – U-464 U-487 – U-490	Kriegsmarine	Type XIV	submarine tender ("Milchkuh")	1,932		
U-459 – U-464 U-487 – U-490	Kriegsmarine	Type XXI	submarine ("Elektroboot")	1,819		
U-D1	Kriegsmarine	H	training submarine	441	1915	Sold to Netherlands 1917, scuttled and refloated by Germany 1939, paid off 23 November 1943
Uganda	Royal Navy; Royal Canadian Navy	Crown Colony	light cruiser	8,800	21 October 1944	Transferred to RCN as HMCS Uganda 21 October 1944, renamed HMCS Quebec 14 January 1952, scrapped 1961
Ulster	Royal Navy	U	destroyer	1,777	30 June 1943	Paid off 1977, scrapped 1980
Ulysses	Royal Navy	U	destroyer	1,777	23 December 1943	Paid off 1963, scrapped 1970
Undaunted	Royal Navy	U	destroyer	1,777	3 March 1944	Paid off 1974, sunk as target 1978
Underhill	United States Navy	Buckley	destroyer escort	1,673	15 November 1943	Sunk 24 July 1945
Undine	Royal Navy	U	destroyer	1,777	23 December 1943	Scrapped November 1965
Unicorn	Royal Navy		aircraft maintenance carrier	16,510	12 March 1943	Scrapped 1960
Unryū	Imperial Japanese Navy	Unryū	aircraft carrier	17,150	6 August 1944	Sunk 19 December 1944
Unyō	Imperial Japanese Navy	Taiyō	escort carrier	17,830	31 August 1942	Sunk 15 September 1944
Ursa	Royal Navy	U	destroyer	1,777	23 December 1943	Paid off November 1966
Urchin	Royal Navy	U	destroyer	1,777	24 September 1943	Paid off 1964, scrapped 1967
Urania	Royal Navy	U	destroyer	1,777	18 January 1944	Scrapped 1971
Utah	United States Navy		radio controlled target-ship and anti-aircraft training ship	21,825	31 August 1911	Former Florida-class battleship, recommissioned in 1932, sunk 7 December 1941
