= List of ships of World War II (X) =

The List of ships of the Second World War contains major military vessels of the war, arranged alphabetically and by type. The list includes armed vessels that served during the war and in the immediate aftermath, inclusive of localized ongoing combat operations, garrison surrenders, post-surrender occupation, colony re-occupation, troop and prisoner repatriation, to the end of 1945. For smaller vessels, see also list of World War II ships of less than 1000 tons. Some uncompleted Axis ships are included, out of historic interest. Ships are designated to the country under which they operated for the longest period of the Second World War, regardless of where they were built or previous service history. Submarines show submerged displacement.

Click on headers to sort column alphabetically.

List of ships of World War II (X)
Ship	Country or organization	Class	Type	Displacement (tons)	First commissioned	Fate
X2	Royal Navy	Archimede	submarine	1,230	19 March 1934	Former Italian Galileo Galilei, captured by RN on 18 June 1940; paid off January 1946
X3	Royal Navy	X	submarine	30	1942	paid off 1945
X4	Royal Navy	X	submarine	30	1942	paid off 1945
X5	Royal Navy	X	submarine	30	1943	sunk 22 September 1943
X6	Royal Navy	X	submarine	30	1943	scuttled 22 September 1943
X7	Royal Navy	X	submarine	30	1943	scuttled 22 September 1943
X8	Royal Navy	X	submarine	30	1943	scuttled 17 September 1943
X9	Royal Navy	X	submarine	30	1943	foundered under tow 16 September 1943
X10	Royal Navy	X	submarine	30	1943	scuttled 3 October 1943
X20	Royal Navy	X	submarine	30	1944	paid off
X21	Royal Navy	X	submarine	30	1944	
X22	Royal Navy	X	submarine	30	1944	sank in training 7 February 1944
X23	Royal Navy	X	submarine	30	1944	paid off 1945
X24	Royal Navy	X	submarine	30	1944	paid off 1945
X25	Royal Navy	X	submarine	30	1944	paid off 1945
Xanthus	United States Navy	Xanthus	repair ship	5,801	9 May 1945	built as repair ship, armed and served in various capacities; decommissioned 1946
XE1	Royal Navy	XE	submarine	33	1944	paid off 1945
XE2	Royal Navy	XE	submarine	33	1944	paid off 1945
XE3	Royal Navy	XE	submarine	33	1944	paid off 1945
XE4	Royal Navy	XE	submarine	33	1944	paid off 1945
XE5	Royal Navy	XE	submarine	33	1944	paid off 1945
XE6	Royal Navy	XE	submarine	33	1944	paid off 1945
XE7	Royal Navy	XE	submarine	33	1944	paid off 1952
XE8	Royal Navy	XE	submarine	33	1944	sunk as target 1952, recovered 1973; museum ship
XE9	Royal Navy	XE	submarine	33	1944	paid off 1952
XE10	Royal Navy	XE	submarine	33		cancelled incomplete 1945
XE11	Royal Navy	XE	submarine	33	1944	lost 6 March 1945
XE12	Royal Navy	XE	submarine	33	1944	paid off 1952
Xenia	United States Navy	Artemis	attack cargo ship	4,087	28 July 1945	armed combat transport, decommissioned 1962
XT1	Royal Navy	XT	training submarine	30	1944	paid off 1945
XT2	Royal Navy	XT	training submarine	30	1944	paid off 1945
XT3	Royal Navy	XT	training submarine	30	1944	paid off 1945
XT4	Royal Navy	XT	training submarine	30	1944	paid off 1945
XT5	Royal Navy	XT	training submarine	30	1944	paid off 1945
XT6	Royal Navy	XT	training submarine	30	1944	paid off 1945
