= List of ships of World War II (P) =

The List of ships of the Second World War contains major military vessels of the war, arranged alphabetically and by type. The list includes armed vessels that served during the war and in the immediate aftermath, inclusive of localized ongoing combat operations, garrison surrenders, post-surrender occupation, colony re-occupation, troop and prisoner repatriation, to the end of 1945. For smaller vessels, see also list of World War II ships of less than 1000 tons. Some uncompleted Axis ships are included, out of historic interest. Ships are designated to the country under which they operated for the longest period of the Second World War, regardless of where they were built or previous service history. Submarines show submerged displacement.

Click on headers to sort column alphabetically.

List of ships of World War II (P)
Ship	Country or organization	Class	Type	Displacement (tons)	First commissioned	Fate
P222	Royal Navy	S	submarine	814	4 March 1942	sunk 12 December 1942
Pakenham	Royal Navy	P	destroyer	1,690	4 February 1942	constructive loss, scuttled 16 April 1943
Paladin	Royal Navy	P	destroyer	1,690	December 1941	paid off June 1961, scrapped 1962
Pandora	Royal Navy	Parthian	submarine	2,070	30 June 1930	sunk 1 April 1942, scrapped 1955
Panthir	Hellenic Navy	Aetos	destroyer	1,030	19 October 1912	Decommissioned 1946
Panther	Royal Navy	P	destroyer	1,690	12 December 1941	sunk 9 October 1943
	Argentine Navy	Rosario	gunboat	1,055	1909	Sold 28 August 1958
Paris	French Navy; Royal Navy	Courbet	Battleship	23,475	5 June 1913	captured by Britain 3 July 1940 used as depot ship, scrapped 1956
Parker	United States Navy	Benson	destroyer	1,620	31 August 1942	decommissioned 1947, scrapped 1973
Parry Sound	Royal Canadian Navy	Flower modified	corvette	1,015	30 August 1944	10 July 1945
Parthian	Royal Navy	Parthian	submarine	2,070	30 June 1930	sunk August 1943
Partridge	Royal Navy	P	destroyer	1,690	5 July 1941	paid off 1 January 1946
Pasadena	United States Navy	Cleveland	light cruiser	11,800	8 June 1944	scrapped 1970
Pathan	Royal Indian Navy	P	sloop	623	5 August 1921	sunk 23 June 1940
Pathfinder	Royal Navy	P	destroyer	1,690	13 April 1942	paid off 1945, scrapped 1948
Patia	Royal Navy		fighter catapult ship	5,355	1940	sunk 27 April 1941
Patna	Royal Indian Navy	Basset	minesweeper	529	1941–1944	1941–1944
Patria	Cuba		gunboat	1,200		
Patroclus	Royal Navy		armed merchant cruiser	11,314	12 September 1939	sunk 4 November 1940
Patroller	Royal Navy	Ruler	escort carrier	11,400	22 October 1943	paid off 7 February 1947, scrapped February 1974
Patterson	United States Navy	Bagley	destroyer	1,500	22 September 1937	scrapped 1947
Peder Skram	Royal Danish Navy	Herluf Trolle	coastal defence ship	3,494		scuttled 29 August 1943
Pegasus	Royal Navy		fighter catapult ship	7,080	10 December 1914	HMS Ark Royal to 1934, paid off June 1946
Penetang	Royal Canadian Navy	River	frigate	1,445	19 October 1944	paid off 2 September 1955
Penn	Royal Navy	P	destroyer	1,690	10 February 1942	scrapped 30 October 1950
Pennsylvania	United States Navy	Pennsylvania	Battleship	33,000	12 June 1916	Decommissioned 29 August 1946, sunk as target 10 February 1948
Pennywort	Royal Navy	Flower	corvette	925	5 March 1942	
Pensacola	United States Navy	Pensacola	heavy cruiser	9,100	6 February 1930	sunk as target 1948
Pentstemon	Royal Navy	Flower	corvette	925	31 July 1941	
Penylan	Royal Navy	Hunt	destroyer	1,050	25 August 1942	sunk 3 December 1942
Peony	Royal Navy; Hellenic Navy	Flower	corvette	925	2 August 1940	to Greece as Sachtouris 1943, scrapped 1952
Perkins	United States Navy	Mahan	destroyer	1,450	18 September 1936	sunk 29 November 1942
Periwinkle	Royal Navy }United States Navy	Flower	corvette	925	8 April 1940	to USA as Restless 15 March 1942, to UK 26 August 1945
Perseus (I)	Royal Navy	Colossus	aircraft maintenance carrier	13,200	16 December 1944	transferred to France 6 August 1946, renamed Arromanches
Perseus (II)	Royal Navy	Parthian	submarine	2,070	15 April 1930	sunk 6 December 1941.
Pert	United States Navy	Flower modified	corvette	1,015	23 July 1943	3 October 1945
Perth	Royal Australian Navy	modified Leander	light cruiser	6,980	29 June 1939 (former HMS Amphion)	sunk 1 March 1942
Peshawar	Royal Indian Navy	Basset	minesweeper	529	1941–1944	1941–1944
Petard	Royal Navy	P	destroyer	1,690	15 June 1942	scrapped June 1967
Peterborough	Royal Canadian Navy	Flower modified	corvette	1,015	1 June 1944	19 July 1945
Petrof Bay	United States Navy	Casablanca	escort carrier	7,800	18 February 1944	decommissioned 31 July 1955, scrapped 1959
Petropavlovsk	Soviet Navy	Admiral Hipper	heavy cruiser	14,680		fought incomplete in siege of Leningrad, and as Tallinn
Petunia	Royal Navy	Flower	corvette	925	13 January 1941	
Phelps	United States Navy	Porter	destroyer	1,850	26 February 1936	scrapped 1947
Philadelphia	United States Navy	Brooklyn	light cruiser	10,200	23 September 1937	transferred to Brazil as Almirante Barroso 1951, scrapped 1973
Phlox	Royal Navy	Flower	corvette	925	May 1942	
Phoenix	United States Navy	Brooklyn	light cruiser	10,200	3 October 1938	transferred to Argentina as General Belgrano 1951, sunk by HMS Conqueror in Falklands War on 2 May 1982
Phoenix	Royal Navy	Parthian	submarine	2,070	3 February 1931	sunk 16 July 1940
Picotee	Royal Navy	Flower	corvette	925	5 September 1940	sunk on 12 August 1941 by U-568
Pictou	Royal Canadian Navy	Flower	corvette	925	29 April 1941	paid off 12 July 1945
Piet Hein	Royal Netherlands Navy	Admiralen	destroyer	1,337	25 January 1929	Sunk 19 February 1942
Pimpernel	Royal Navy	Flower	corvette	925	9 January 1941	
Pindos	Hellenic Navy	Hunt	destroyer	1,050	27 June 1942	paid off 1959, scrapped 1960
Ping Hai	Republic of China Navy		light cruiser	2,200	1936	became Yasoshima (Japan) 1944
Pinguin	Kriegsmarine		Auxiliary cruiser	17,600	6 February 1940	sunk 8 May 1941
Pink	Royal Navy	Flower	corvette	925	2 July 1942	declared total loss after 27 June 1944 in attack by U-988
Pioneer	Royal Navy	Colossus	aircraft maintenance carrier	13,200	8 February 1945	scrapped September 1954
Piorun	Polish Navy	N	destroyer	1,690	4 November 1940	to Poland October 1940, to UK August 1946, scrapped 1955
Pittsburgh	United States Navy	Baltimore	heavy cruiser	17,200	10 October 1944	decommissioned 1956, scrapped 1974
Plunkett	United States Navy	Gleaves	destroyer	1,630	17 July 1940	to Taiwan 1959, scrapped 1975
Pluton	French Navy		minelayer light cruiser	4,773	10 April 1931	lost 13 September 1939
Pola	Regia Marina	Zara	heavy cruiser	11,730	1932	sunk 28 March 1941
Polyanthus	Royal Navy	Flower	corvette	925	24 April 1941	sunk on 21 September 1943 by U-952
Pompeo Magno	Regia Marina	Capitani Romani	light cruiser	3,750	4 June 1943	scrapped in 1980
Poona	Royal Indian Navy	Basset	minesweeper	529	1941–1944	1941–1944
Poppy	Royal Navy	Flower	corvette	925	12 May 1942	
Porcupine	Royal Navy	P	destroyer	1,690	31 August 1942	Strangest vessel of the war? Torpedoed, split almost in half, declared constructive loss March 1943. Towed to harbour, cut into two, rebuilt, and each half was re-commissioned into the Royal Navy; as HMS Pork, and HMS Pine. Paid off 31 August 1946.
Port Arthur	Royal Canadian Navy	Flower	corvette	925	26 May 1942	paid off 11 July 1945
Port Colborne	Royal Canadian Navy	River	frigate	1,445	15 November 1943	paid off 7 November 1945
Porter	United States Navy	Porter	destroyer	1,850	25 August 1936	sunk 26 October 1942
Portland	United States Navy	Portland	heavy cruiser	9,950	23 February 1933	decommissioned 1946, scrapped 1959
Portsmouth	United States Navy	Cleveland	light cruiser	11,800	20 September 1944	scrapped 1974
Poseidon	Royal Navy	Parthian	submarine	2,070	5 May 1930	sunk in accidental collision with a merchant 9 June 1931
Potentilla	Royal Navy; Royal Norwegian Navy	Flower	corvette	925	16 January 1942	to Norway 16 January 1942, to RN 13 March 1944
Poundmaker	Royal Canadian Navy	River	frigate	1,445	17 September 1944	paid off 25 November 1945
Premier	Royal Navy	Ruler	escort carrier	11,400	3 November 1943	paid off 21 May 1946, scrapped 1976
Prescott	Royal Canadian Navy	Flower	corvette	925	26 June 1941	paid off 20 July 1945
Preston	United States Navy	Mahan	destroyer	1,450	27 October 1936	sunk 14 November 1942
Prestonian	Royal Canadian Navy	River	frigate	1,445	13 September 1944	paid off 24 April 1956
Pretoria Castle	Royal Navy		armed merchant cruiser	23,450	28 November 1939	training merchant aircraft carrier from July 1943, reconverted to passenger liner
Primauguet	French Navy	Duguay-Trouin	light cruiser	7,249	1 April 1927	scuttled 8 November 1942
Primrose	Royal Navy	Flower	corvette	925	15 July 1940	
Primula	Royal Navy	Flower	corvette	925	27 August 1940	
Prudent	United States Navy	Flower modified	corvette	1,015	16 August 1943	11 October 1945
Prince David	Royal Canadian Navy		armed merchant cruiser	5,736	28 December 1940	Broken up 1951
Prince Henry	Royal Canadian Navy		armed merchant cruiser	6,893	3 November 1940	paid off July 1946
Prince of Wales	Royal Navy	King George V	battleship	35,000	31 March 1941	sunk 10 December 1941
Prince Robert	Royal Canadian Navy		armed merchant cruiser	6,892	December 1940	paid off 10 December 1945
Prince Rupert	Royal Canadian Navy	River	frigate	1,445	30 August 1943	paid off 15 January 1946
Princeton	United States Navy	Independence	light aircraft carrier	11,000	25 February 1943	sunk 24 October 1944
Prins van Oranje	Royal Netherlands Navy	Prins van Oranje	minelayer	1,291	2 February 1932	sunk 12 January 1942
Prinz Eugen	Kriegsmarine	enlarged Admiral Hipper	heavy cruiser	14,680	1 August 1940	sunk after A-bomb test at Bikini in 1946
Proteus	Royal Navy	Parthian	submarine	2,070	5 May 1930	Scrapped in March 1946 at Troon
Provence	French Navy	Bretagne	Battleship	22,200	1 March 1916	scuttled 27 November 1942,
Providence	United States Navy	Cleveland	light cruiser	11,800	15 May 1945	converted to missile cruiser 1959, scrapped 1980
Prunella	Royal Navy		Special Service Ship	4,443		sunk 21 June 1940
Psara	Hellenic Navy	Kountouriotis	destroyer	1,350	1933	sunk 20 April 1941
Puckeridge	Royal Navy	Hunt	destroyer	1,000		sunk 6 September 1943 by U-617
Puget Sound	United States Navy	Commencement Bay	escort carrier	10,900	18 June 1945	scrapped January 1962
Puncher	Royal Navy; Royal Canadian Navy	Ruler	escort carrier	11,400	5 February 1944	Crewed by RCN, paid off 16 February 1946, scrapped 1973
Punjab	Royal Indian Navy	Bathurst	corvette	1,025	20 March 1942	Decommissioned 1949
Punjabi	Royal Navy	Tribal	destroyer	2,020	29 March 1939	sunk 1 May 1942
Pursuer	Royal Navy	Attacker	escort carrier	11,400	14 June 1943	Returned to USN 12 February 1946, sold for scrap May 1946
Pytchley	Royal Navy	Hunt	destroyer	1,050	23 October 1940	paid off 1946, scrapped 1956
