= List of ships of World War II (F) =

The List of ships of the Second World War contains major military vessels of the war, arranged alphabetically and by type. The list includes armed vessels that served during the war and in the immediate aftermath, inclusive of localized ongoing combat operations, garrison surrenders, post-surrender occupation, colony re-occupation, troop and prisoner repatriation, to the end of 1945. For smaller vessels, see also list of World War II ships of less than 1000 tons. Some uncompleted Axis ships are included, out of historic interest. Ships are designated to the country under which they operated for the longest period of the Second World War, regardless of where they were built or previous service history. Submarines show submerged displacement.

Click on headers to sort column alphabetically.

List of ships of World War II (F)
Ship	Country or organization	Class	Type	Displacement (tons)	First commissioned	Fate
Falke	Kriegsmarine	Raubvogel	torpedo boat	1,290	15 August 1927	sunk 15 June 1944
Fall River	United States Navy	Baltimore	heavy cruiser	17,200	1 July 1945	decommissioned 1947, scrapped 1972
Fanning	United States Navy	Mahan	destroyer	1,450	8 October 1937	scrapped 1948
Fanshaw Bay	United States Navy	Casablanca	escort carrier	7,800	9 December 1943	decommissioned 14 August 1946, scrapped 1959
Farenholt	United States Navy	Benson	destroyer	1,620	2 April 1942	decommissioned 1946, scrapped 1972
Farndale	Royal Navy	Hunt	destroyer escort	1,050	27 April 1941	scrapped 1962
Farragut	United States Navy	Farragut	destroyer	1,365	18 June 1934	scrapped 1947
Fencer	Royal Navy	Attacker	escort carrier	14,400	20 February 1943	paid off 21 December 1945, sold as a merchant ship; scrapped 1975
Fennel	Royal Navy; Royal Canadian Navy	Flower	corvette	925	16 January 1941	to Canada 15 May 1941, paid off 12 June 1945
Fergus	Royal Canadian Navy	Flower modified	corvette	1,015	18 November 1944	14 July 1945
Fernie	Royal Navy	Hunt	destroyer escort	1,000	29 May 1940	paid off 1947
Fidelity	Royal Navy		Special Service Ship	2,456	24 September 1940	sunk 30 December 1942
Fiji	Royal Navy	Fiji	light cruiser	8,000	5 May 1940	sunk 22 May 1941
Finisterre	Royal Navy	Battle	destroyer	2,325	11 September 1945	paid off 1965, scrapped 1967
Fitch	United States Navy	Gleaves	destroyer	1,630	3 February 1942	decommissioned 1956, sunk as target 1973
Fiume	Regia Marina	Zara	heavy cruiser	11,500	1931	sunk 29 March 1941
Fletcher	United States Navy	Fletcher	destroyer	2,100	30 June 1942	Decommissioned 1 August 1969, scrapped 1972
Fleur de Lys	Royal Navy	Flower	corvette	925	26 August 1940	14 October 1941
Flint	United States Navy	Atlanta	light cruiser	6,000	31 August 1944	decommissioned 1947, scrapped 1966
Flores	Royal Netherlands Navy	Flores	gunboat	1,457	25 March 1926	scrapped November 1968
Flusser	United States Navy	Mahan	destroyer	1,450	1 October 1936	scrapped 1948
Foch	French Navy	Suffren	heavy cruiser	10,000	15 August 1931	scuttled 27 November 1942
Folkestone	Royal Navy	Folkestone	sloop	1,045	25 June 1940	scrapped 22 May 1947
Formidable	Royal Navy	Illustrious	aircraft carrier	23,000	24 November 1940	scrapped 1953
Forrest	United States Navy	Gleaves	destroyer	1,630	13 January 1942	scrapped 1946
Forrest Hill	Royal Canadian Navy	Flower modified	corvette	1,015	1 December 1943	9 July 1945
Fort Erie	Royal Canadian Navy	River	frigate	1,445	27 October 1944	paid off 26 March 1965
Fort Mandan	United States Navy	Casa Grande	Dock landing ship	7,930	31 October 1945	Transferred to Greece 23 January 1971
Fort Marion	United States Navy	Casa Grande	Dock landing ship	7,930	29 January 1946	Transferred to Taiwan, 15 April 1977
Fortune	Royal Navy; Royal Canadian Navy	F	destroyer	1,405	27 April 1935	to Canada as Saskatchewan 31 May 1943, mined 21 June 1944
Foxhound	Royal Navy; Royal Canadian Navy	V	destroyer	1,405	6 June 1935	Transferred to RCN 8 February 1944 as Qu'Appelle, paid off 26 May 1946
Frankford	United States Navy	Gleaves	destroyer	1,630	31 March 1943	decommissioned 1946, sunk as target 1973
Franklin	United States Navy	Essex	aircraft carrier	30,800	31 January 1944	Decommissioned 17 February 1947, scrapped 1964
Fraser	Royal Canadian Navy	C	destroyer	1,375	17 February 1937	sunk in a collision 25 June 1940
Frazier	United States Navy	Benson	destroyer	1,620	30 July 1942	decommissioned 1946, scrapped 1972
Frederick C. Davis	United States Navy	Edsall	destroyer escort	1,200	14 July 1943	sunk 24 April 1945
Fredericton	Royal Canadian Navy	Flower	corvette	925	8 December 1941	paid off 14 July 1945
Freesia	Royal Navy	Flower	corvette	925	19 November 1940	
Fresia	Chilean Navy	H	submarine	441	1917	scrapped 1945
Fridtjof Nansen	Royal Norwegian Navy		patrol ship	1,575	29 May 1931	ran aground and sank 8 November 1940
Fritillary	Royal Navy	Flower	corvette	925	1 November 1941	
Frobisher	Royal Navy	Hawkins	heavy cruiser	9,750	20 September 1924	sold for scrap March 26, 1949
Frome	Royal Navy; Free French Naval Forces	River	frigate	1,370	3 March 1944	to Free French 3 March 1944 as Escarmouche, paid off 1960
Frontenac	Royal Canadian Navy	Flower modified	corvette	1,015	26 October 1943	22 July 1945
Fu An	Republic of China Navy		gunboat	1,900		
Fubuki	Imperial Japanese Navy	Fubuki	destroyer	1,750	10 August 1928	sunk 11 October 1942
Fujinami	Imperial Japanese Navy	Yūgumo	destroyer	2,520	31 July 1943	sunk 10 January 1945
Fumizuki	Imperial Japanese Navy	Mutsuki	destroyer	1,315	3 July 1926	sunk 18 February 1944
Furious	Royal Navy	Glorious	aircraft carrier	22,400	14 October 1917	scrapped 1948
Furutaka	Imperial Japanese Navy	Furutaka	heavy cruiser	9,150	31 March 1926	sunk 20 December 1942
Fury	Royal Navy	F	destroyer	1,405	10 September 1934	mined 21 June 1944, not repaired
Fusō	Imperial Japanese Navy	Fusō	dreadnought	34,700	18 November 1915	sunk 25 October 1944
Fuyutsuki	Imperial Japanese Navy	Akizuki	destroyer	2,700	30 April 1944	scrapped and converted to breakwater 1948
