= NMS Vedenia =

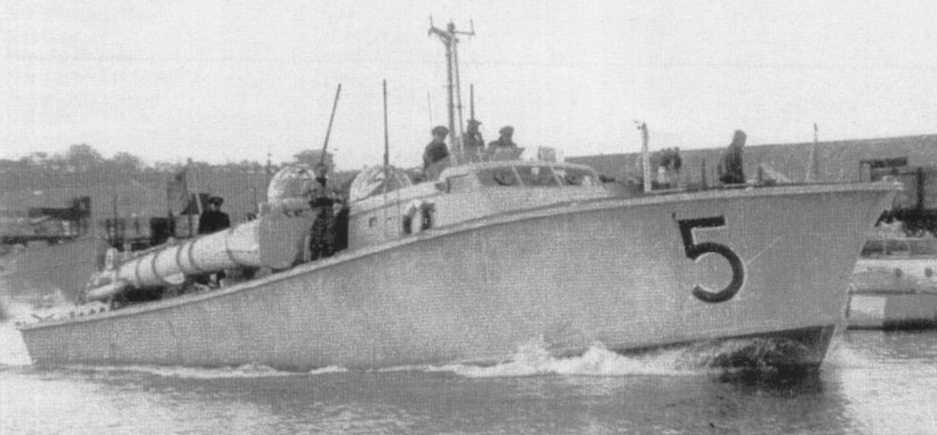
- Sister ship Vântul

Class overview
- Name: Vedenia-class motor torpedo boat
- Builders: Galați shipyard, Romania
- Operators: Romanian Naval Forces
- Built: 1939-1943
- In commission: 1943-1949?
- Completed: 6
- Retired: 6

History

Romania
- Name: Vedenia
- Launched: 1939
- Commissioned: 1943
- Fate: Unknown after 1949

Service record
- Commanders: Ion Zaharia
- Victories: Contribution to the sinking of 1 S-boat

General characteristics
- Type: MTB/Escort vessel
- Displacement: 30 tons
- Length: 21.33 meters
- Speed: 41 knots
- Armament: 2 × 20 mm Hispano-Suiza AA guns; 2 x 533 mm torpedo tubes

NMS Vedenia was a Second World War motor torpedo boat of the Romanian Navy. She was the lead ship of a class of six vessels and saw service during the second half of the war.

== Construction and specifications ==
In 1940, Romania acquired a class of three Vospers type motor torpedo boats, led by NMS Viscolul. During the Second World War, Romania built six Dutch-designed torpedo boats. Numbered 4 to 9, the six boats were launched in 1939 and were fitted out to largely emulate the Vospers boats, having the same length (70 feet/21.33 meters), the same displacement (30 tons), the same top speed (41 knots) and the same torpedo armament (two 21 inch/533 mm torpedo tubes). They differed in terms of artillery, each boat having two 20 mm Hispano-Suiza autocannons as opposed to eight machine guns. The names of the six boats, in order of their numbering, were: Vedenia, Vântul, Vijelia, Viforul, Vârtejul and Vulcanul. Built at the Galați shipyard, Vedenia and her sisters were commissioned in 1943.

== Service ==
Along with one surviving Vospers boat, Vedenia and her five sisters formed the Escadrila de vedete torpiloare (The motor torpedo boat squadron), part of the Grupul submarine și vedete torpiloare (The submarines and motor torpedo boats group). The captain of Vedenia, Ion Zaharia, was also the leader of the entire squadron.

Vedenia was the only boat of her class to be fitted for escort service. On 25–26 May 1944, Vedenia and the surviving Vospers boat, along with two Romanian torpedo boats and two destroyers, escorted the Romanian minelayers Amiral Murgescu and Dacia, as the two laid a barrage of mines off Sulina to reinforce the existing one. The mines laid off Sulina sank the German S-boat S-148 on 22 August 1944.

Vedenia and her sisters were last mentioned in 1949.
