= Najaden-class torpedo boat =

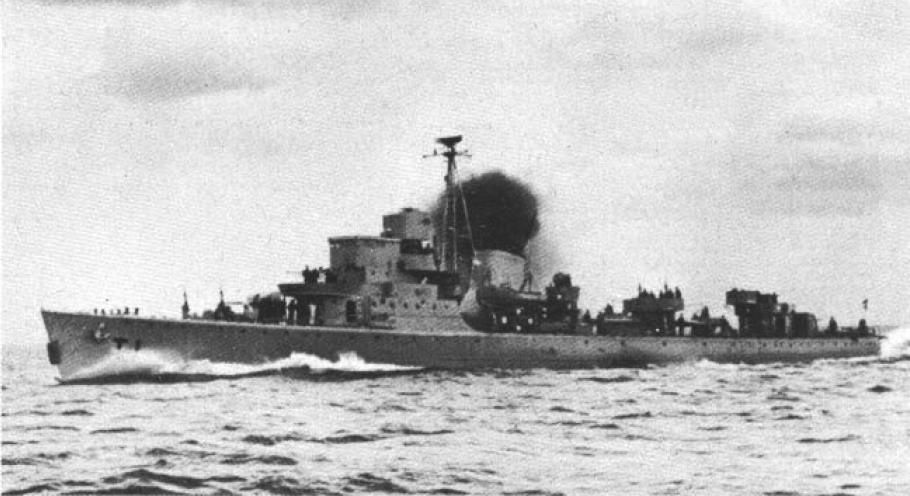
- HDMS Huitfeldt in 1947

Class overview
- Builders: Copenhagen Naval Dockyard
- Operators: Royal Danish Navy
- Built: 1942–1947
- In commission: 1947–1966
- Completed: 2
- Retired: 2
- Scrapped: 2

General characteristics
- Type: Torpedo boat
- Displacement: 782 long tons (795 t) standard, 890 long tons (900 t) full load
- Length: 86.3 m (283 ft) oa, 85.0 m (279 ft) pp
- Beam: 8.33 m (27 ft 4 in)
- Draught: 3.51 m (11 ft 6 in)
- Propulsion: Geared steam turbines, 2 shafts; 16,000 kW (21,000 shp)
- Speed: 35 kn (65 km/h; 40 mph)
- Complement: 92
- Armament: 2 × 105 mm guns; 3 × Bofors 40 mm gun; 6 × Madsen 20 mm anti-aircraft cannon; 6 × 530 mm (21 inch) torpedo tubes; Depth charge throwers; Up to 60 mines

The Najaden class, also known as the Huitfeldt class, was a class of two torpedo boats built for and operated by the Royal Danish Navy. Construction started in 1942, with the ships being completed in 1947, and continuing in service until 1966.

== Construction and design ==
In 1939, Denmark ordered two torpedo boats (originally to be named Aarhus and Aalborg) for the Royal Danish Navy. The new class were much larger and more capable than existing torpedo craft of the Danish Navy, where the most modern examples, the Dragen and Glenten classes, displaced 335 long tons (340 t) with a speed of 27.5 knots (51 km/h; 32 mph), compared with 890 long tons (900 t) and 35 knots (65 km/h; 40 mph) for the new ships.

Construction was delayed by the German invasion of Denmark in 1940, with the ships not being laid down until 3 July 1942. (Note: Although Denmark was occupied by Germany following the 1940 invasion, its government remained independent, retaining control of its partially disarmed armed forces and was nominally neutral.) They were launched in 1943, but when Germany dissolved the Danish government on 29 August 1943, it did not attempt to complete the half-built ships. Work restarted following the liberation of Denmark, and the two ships were completed in 1947.

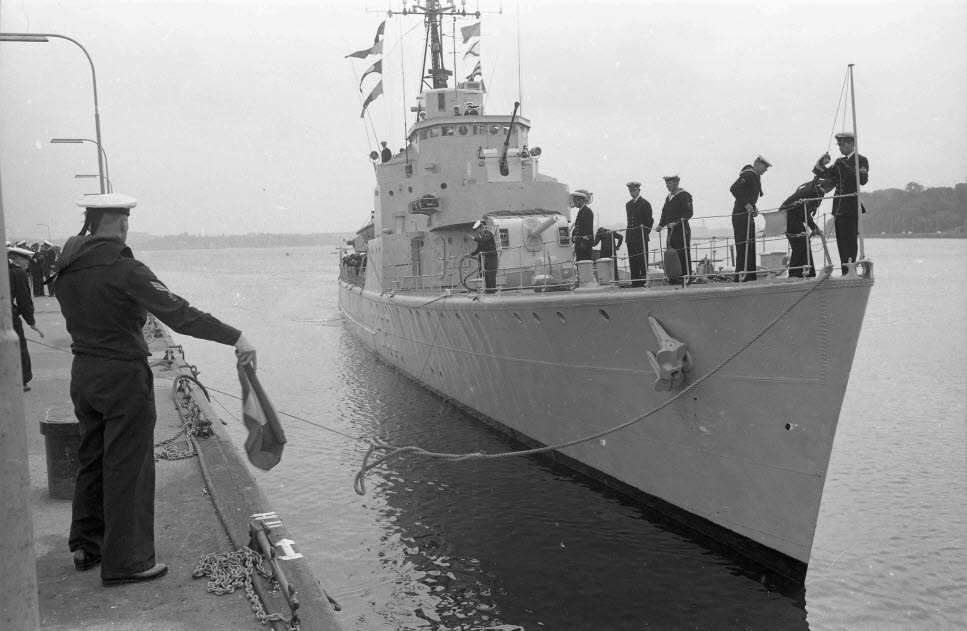
Huitfeldt at Kiel in 1963

As completed, they had an armament of two 105 mm M/40 guns, (Note: They may have originally been planned to be fitted with 120 mm guns.) with three Bofors 40 mm and six Madsen 20 mm anti-aircraft guns. Torpedo armament was six 450 mm torpedo tubes, which had been originally fitted to the Dragen- and Glenten-class torpedo boats, which were disarmed in 1941 when taken over by Germany. They were powered by geared steam turbines, giving 16,000 kilowatts (21,000 shp) and driving two shafts.

== Service ==
When they entered service, they were designated torpedo boats, but were re-designated Coastal Destroyers (Kystjager) in 1951 and Patrol Boats in 1958. The 450 mm torpedo tubes were replaced by 530 mm tubes in 1951, and the 20 mm cannon removed in 1961. Both ships were sold for scrap on 27 May 1966.

== Ships ==
Construction data
1942 name	1945 name	Ship's badge	Laid down	Launched	Completed	Fate
Najaden	Willemoes		3 July 1942	17 March 1943	30 June 1947	Sold for scrap 27 May 1966
Nymfen	Huitfeldt		3 July 1942	22 June 1943	31 July 1947	Sold for scrap 27 May 1966
