= USS Farenholt =

Two ships of United States Navy were named USS Farenholt for Admiral Oscar Farenholt.

- The first USS Farenholt (DD-332) was commissioned in 1921 and decommissioned in 1930.
- The second USS Farenholt (DD-491) was commissioned in 1942 and decommissioned in 1946.
