= USS Woodworth =

Benson-class destroyer

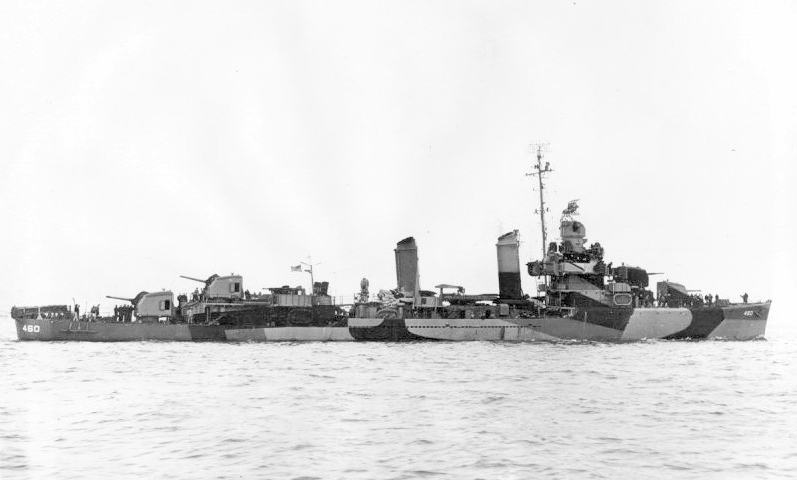
- USS Woodworth (DD-460) in 1944

History

United States
- Name: USS Woodworth
- Namesake: Selim E. Woodworth
- Builder: Bethlehem Shipbuilding Corporation, San Francisco, California
- Laid down: 30 April 1941
- Launched: 29 November 1941
- Commissioned: 30 April 1942
- Decommissioned: 14 January 1951
- Stricken: 22 January 1951
- Identification: DD-460
- Fate: Transferred to Italy, 1951

Italy
- Name: Artigliere
- Acquired: 1951
- Identification: D 553
- Fate: Scrapped, 1971

General characteristics
- Class & type: Benson-class destroyer; Artigliere-class destroyer
- Displacement: 1,620 long tons (1,646 t)
- Length: 347 ft 9 in (105.99 m)
- Beam: 36 ft 1 in (11.00 m)
- Draft: 17 ft 4 in (5.28 m)
- Speed: 37.6 knots (69.6 km/h; 43.3 mph)
- Complement: 276
- Armament: 4 × 5-inch 38 caliber dual purpose guns; 1 × quad 1.1 in (28 mm) gun; 5 × 20 mm guns; 2 × depth charge tracks; 6 × depth charge projectors; 5 × 21 inch (533 mm) torpedo tubes

USS Woodworth (DD-460) was a Benson-class destroyer in the United States Navy during World War II. She was named for Commander Selim E. Woodworth.

Woodworth was laid down on 30 April 1941 at San Francisco, California, by the Bethlehem Steel Company; launched on 29 November 1941; sponsored by Mrs. Selim E. Woodworth, niece and daughter-in-law of Commander Woodworth; and commissioned on 30 April 1942.

== Service history ==
=== World War II ===
After four months spent in fitting out and shakedown, Woodworth spent the remainder of 1942 performing escort duty in the Southwest Pacific area. She stopped at many ports between Australia and Guadalcanal. Woodworth was attached to Task Force (TF) 65 in January 1943, conducting patrols and exercises at the western entrance to Espiritu Santo, New Hebrides.

On 2 February, Woodworth passed to the control of Vice Admiral Richard P. Leary who commanded TF 69 from his flagship, New Mexico. Two days later, that formation was merged with TF 18 consisting of the cruiser Wichita, two aircraft carriers, three light cruisers, and four destroyers. An oiler and another destroyer also joined the force on 5 February. The month of February was devoted to patrolling and escorting transports in waters between the Solomon Islands and the New Hebrides. After escorting transports to the Fiji Islands on 1 March, Woodworth returned to Espiritu Santo on 13 March and joined TF 15 organized around the aircraft carrier Enterprise. Woodworth entered port at Espiritu Santo on 21 March and the following day commenced tender availability. On 3 April, she headed back to the Solomons, arriving at Tulagi on 5 April for entrance patrol. The next day, Woodworth escorted the oiler Tappahannock to Kukum and then resumed her patrol.

On 7 April, while escorting Tappahannock in the Solomons area, Woodworth came under enemy air attack by six planes north of Rua Sura Island. Four bombs dropped close aboard Tappahannock. Two struck the sea on the starboard side and threw considerable water over the ship. The attack, which lasted about four minutes, caused no personnel casualties and only minor material damage. Woodworth spent the remainder of April and early May in tactical training exercises, escort, and patrol in waters between the New Hebrides and New Caledonia. From 8 May to 29 June, Woodworth escorted transports carrying reinforcements to Guadalcanal and helped to screen TF 10—consisting of two carriers, three battleships, one cruiser, and several destroyers—to Nouméa. Woodworth continued on to Auckland, New Zealand, where she underwent restricted availability before escorting the oiler Tallulah to Nouméa. Woodworth then screened transports steaming from Espiritu Santo to Guadalcanal.

On 30 June, while escorting amphibious forces to Rendova Island, Solomon Islands, Woodworth came under air attack by 12 low-flying Japanese torpedo bombers. Woodworth's maneuvers enabled her to avoid the torpedoes, and she suffered only one personnel casualty and mere superficial damage from three machine gun hits.

On 2 July 1943, Woodworth and the destroyer Jenkins bombarded Japanese positions on Wickham Island, Vonguna, New Georgia, to assist the advance of troops ashore. The next day, Woodworth sailed for Tulagi, touched at Port Purvis on Florida Island and Rendova Harbor, and arrived off Rice Anchorage on 5 July 1943 to participate in the first landing operations there. Later that day, she headed for Port Purvis. On 11 July, Woodworth, along with the destroyers Kilty, Crosby, and Schley, took part in the second landing operations at Rice Anchorage. While returning to Guadalcanal the following morning, Taylor fired on, depth charged, but failed to sink the Japanese submarine I-25.

On 13 July, as part of Task Group (TG) 36.1, Woodworth took part in the Battle of Kolombangara, one of a series of naval engagements for control of waters between Vella La Vella and Kolombangara to the south and Choiseul to the north. The Japanese force consisted of one cruiser and five destroyers. Woodworth fired four torpedoes, and a fifth misfired. During the action, she was struck a glancing blow to the stern by Buchanan, causing some flooding and light damage, but she continued to screen the cruiser St. Louis which was hit by a torpedo. The destroyer Gwin was also hit and exploded. Nothing could be seen of that destroyer but a 300-foot (91 m)-high column of smoke. Damage control efforts for Gwin were futile, and she was scuttled. Woodworth suffered no personnel casualties.

Woodworth conducted patrol and escort operations between Espiritu Santo and Guadalcanal until 7 October when she joined TF 38. Following training exercises, she departed Espiritu Santo on 29 October with TF 38 organized around the carriers Saratoga and Princeton. They launched air attacks on Buka, Shortland Islands, on 1 and 2 November 1943 and conducted raids on Rabaul on 5 and again on 11 November before becoming detached from TF 38 on 14 November.

Woodworth sailed for Guadalcanal on 16 November in the escort of the transport Pinkney, then took part in patrol operations in the Solomon area until late December as part of TG 36.1. On 26 December, Woodworth departed Espiritu Santo to carry a deck cargo of 1,500 rounds of 5-inch (127 mm) projectiles and 1,500 rounds of 5-inch powder charges to Port Purvis near Tulagi.

On the evening of 8 January 1944, Woodworth took part in the bombardment of the Shortland Islands and encountered ineffective return fire from the shore. She conducted escort and patrol operations between the northern Solomons and the Bismarck Archipelago until 13 January when she joined Destroyer Squadron (Des Ron) 12 and, with the destroyers Farenholt, Lansdowne, and Buchanan, conducted a bombardment of shore installations, barge concentrations, and staging points on the northeast coast of Bougainville, Baniu Harbor, and Ruri Bay, Solomon Islands; but she encountered no return fire and no air or surface opposition. While transiting Bougainville Strait, Woodworth fired five salvoes at a Japanese tent camp on the northwest tip of Choiseul Island. She then spent the remainder of January through 13 February, in escort and training exercises to Torokina, barge-hunting off Bougainville, escort to Port Purvis, and escort and training exercises at Sydney, Australia.

On 13 February, Woodworth, in the company of TF 38, covered the advance of the assault on Green Island. The following day, the task force was attacked by a group of six enemy dive bombers. St. Louis was hit and suffered the loss of 23 men. Several snoopers later approached the task force and were taken under fire, Woodworth's guns accounted for one while she and her sister ships sustained no casualties or damage. On 14 and 15 February, Woodworth, with Farenholt, Buchanan, Lansdowne, and Lardner, conducted an antishipping sweep of St. George's Channel north of Rabaul, New Britain, but encountered no Japanese vessels. On 17 and 18 February, the same destroyers bombarded Rabaul and shore batteries on Praed Point. Woodworth fired torpedoes at two ships leaving Simpson Harbor and later at large groups of ships in Kervia Bay. She also fired her guns at targets near Timber Point and Cape Gazelle. On 24 February, while conducting an antishipping sweep along Truk-Kavieng, New Ireland, shipping lanes about 60 miles northwest of Kavieng, she made radar contact with a Japanese merchant vessel and a large, heavily laden tanker. Woodworth fired 38 rounds of 5-inch/38-caliber at the merchant vessel which was closed and sunk by DesDiv 24. Woodworth fishtailed at various times to avoid shells from the shore batteries. Two enemy ships were sunk in the harbor, and one other was damaged and left burning. The American warship also set numerous barges afire in Steffen Strait and engaged Japanese shore batteries. Woodworth arrived at Port Purvis, Florida Island, on 26 February.

From 1 through 21 March, Woodworth conducted training exercises, escort missions, antisubmarine searches, and barge-hunting operations throughout the Solomon Islands. She fired at enemy positions and encountered no opposition. Woodworth departed Port Purvis with Buchanan on 22 March, bound for Pearl Harbor. She joined TG 35.6 with a merchant convoy of five ships off Guadalcanal and proceeded to Hawaii with it. On 9 April, Woodworth cleared Pearl Harbor and steamed to San Francisco. She was drydocked at the Mare Island Navy Yard on 15 April 1944.

The destroyer underwent an overhaul and refresher training exercises until 21 July when she joined TG 12.1 and steamed to Hawaii on a presidential cruise with the destroyers Dunlap, Cummings, Fanning, and the cruiser Baltimore. Baltimore was carrying President Franklin D. Roosevelt to Pearl Harbor to discuss future strategy in the Pacific with Admiral Chester Nimitz and General Douglas MacArthur. Following the conference, the task force took the President north to Alaska and the Aleutian Islands. President Roosevelt left Baltimore at Kodiak, Alaska on 8 August, and proceeded to Bremerton, Washington, on Cummings. Woodworth arrived at San Francisco on 14 August 1944, but sailed the following day for Pearl Harbor, where she arrived on 20 August for more than one month of training exercises. On 30 September, she entered Ulithi Atoll for antisubmarine patrol; and, on 7 October, she joined TG 38.1.

In late 1944, while refueling at sea from the carrier Salamaua, Woodworth sustained numerous superficial damages as a result of a mid-refueling collision. First Class Quartermaster L. G. Chacona, while manning the wheel during the exercise, struggled against a port-ward drift until the ship veered off course enough to cause the hawser line, whose usage was discontinued as a result of the accident, connecting the two bows to snap. Soon after the fuel lines also snapped causing a fuel spill over the decks. As the boats collided, Woodworth sustained heavy damage along the port side bridge. Salamaua sustained only a hole from puncture of Woodworth's port anchor, resulting in Salamaua being nicknamed "The Can-Opener". Woodworth returned to the port of Salerno for repairs before returning to duty.

The carriers of Woodworth's task group launched an air strike on Okinawa on 10 October, and the planes later raided Japanese installations at Aparri, northern Luzon. On 12 October, the first strikes on Formosa were launched. Woodworth was on a picket station 12 miles (19 km) east of the formation when she was attacked by Japanese torpedo planes at 1815. She fired at several planes but failed to score any hits. The ship sustained heavy weather damage and expended 160 rounds of 5-inch ammunition, 100 rounds of 40 mm, and 320 rounds of 20 mm. The following day, five Japanese twin-engine, land-based planes attacked the formation. Woodworth shot down one plane which crashed in flames after passing over the fantail. During the action, the cruiser Canberra was hit by a torpedo and sustained heavy damage. A third day of strikes against Formosa on 14 October summoned three waves of air attacks by the Japanese. Friendly fighters intercepted and repelled the first two strikes. The third wave consisted of eight or nine enemy aircraft; Woodworth claimed to have shot down three: "Two planes were seen to burst into flames. It was a pretty sight." All the planes destroyed were credited to the use of Mk 32 projectiles of which Woodworth used 75 percent. In this action, the light cruiser Houston was torpedoed and heavily damaged.

On 15 October, TG 38.1 began preparations for attacks on Japanese installations in the Philippines. The first of these occurred on 18 October at Luzon, Philippine Islands. These attacks continued through the end of the month to support the first phase of Major General Douglas MacArthur's liberation of the Philippines. Woodworthwas then detached from TG 38.1 and steamed to Leyte Gulf to join TG 30.3 before it sailed for Ulithi.

Woodworth spent November in screening exercises, antisubmarine patrol at Eniwetok, and escorted a convoy to the Palau Islands. She spent December patrolling off Peleliu and Angaur Island in the Palau group; conducting independent antisubmarine patrol; and escorting a convoy to Leyte Gulf. Woodworth and the destroyer McCalla then screened a five-ship convoy to Ulithi on 2 January 1945. There, Woodworth underwent tender availability until 11 January. The next day, she assisted in the rescue of LCI(L)-600 and participated in hunter-killer operations with McCalla.

Woodworth got underway as TU 94.18.12 on 15 January for gunnery practice. She was boarded by Capt. W. P. Burford and staff and served as a station ship for gunnery practice off Kossol Roads, Palau, throughout February. On 12 March, Captain Burford relieved Commander D. E. Brown as CTU 94.6.21. Thus, Woodworth became the station ship for the Ulithi Surface Patrol and Escort Group and participated in search and rescue operations for the remainder of March. Woodworth next underwent tender availability and took patrol station off Mugai Channel at the entrance to Ulithi Harbor on 25 April. She took part in escort and gunnery exercises with Enterprise and Hubbard until 5 May.

Woodworth patrolled the transport anchorage area southwest of Okinawa on 9 May; the following day, she escorted the carrier Makin Island to Kerama Retto harbor and there joined a task unit consisting of six CVEs and nine escorts. From 10 May through 28 May, Woodworth took part in daily air strikes on Okinawa. On 28 May, she and Henley escorted the carrier Natoma Bay to Kerama Retto, Okinawa Shima, where Woodworth underwent repairs until 6 June. The following day, while conducting air strikes on Miyako Retto of Sakishimo Gunto, two undetected enemy planes closed the formation and made suicide dives on the escort carriers. One crashed into Natoma Bay and the other into the sea.

Woodworth supported air strikes on Okinawa; Kyūshū, Japan; and various islands of the Ryukyus from 8 June until 21 June when she rescued a crashed pilot from the carrier Steamer Bay. She spent 22 and 23 June on radar picket duty off Okinawa and departed the Ryukyus on 24 June, bound for Leyte Gulf. She underwent tender availability from 1 to 10 July when she turned her attention to screening the fueling and replenishing of TF 38 (Fast Carrier Force) and devoted the remainder of July to assisting logistic operations for the Fast Carrier Force during strikes on the main islands of Japan.

On 2 August, Woodworth escorted the oiler Neshanic via Guam to Ulithi. On 12 August, Woodworth joined in an attempt to rescue a downed pilot, but he was dead when help arrived. On 14 August, Woodworth was ordered to proceed independently to Iwo Jima to pick up mail and passengers for the Fast Carrier Force. She joined in the refueling and replenishment of the flattops on 18 August. On 22 August, she was then assigned to a task unit organized around Rear Admiral Thomas L. Sprague in the carrier Ticonderoga which was charged with providing air coverage for the first occupation force to go to the Japanese homeland. On 5 September, Woodworth took part in firing practices and replenishment until 10 September when she anchored in Tokyo Bay. But for brief training and escort periods at sea, she remained there through the end of the month.

On 1 October, Woodworth got underway for Okinawa and left that island on 6 October, bound for home with 50 men and eight officers embarked as passengers for the voyage. She arrived in Portland, Oregon, on 19 October and, 10 days later, headed south for San Pedro, California.

=== Post War and the Italian Navy ===
Woodworth was transferred to the Atlantic Fleet in November and proceeded through the Panama Canal to Charleston, South Carolina. After inactivation overhaul there, the destroyer was placed out of commission, in reserve, on 11 April 1946. She was placed in service on 30 January 1947 for Naval Reserve training duty. Placed in full commission on 21 November 1950, the ship was briefly assigned to the 3rd Naval District before she was decommissioned at the New York Naval Shipyard on 14 January 1951 and overhauled to prepare her for transfer to Italy. Her name was struck from the Navy list on 22 January 1951, and she was turned over to the Italian Navy on 11 June 1951.

== Artigliere (D 553) ==
She served Italy as Artigliere (D 553), operating as a fleet destroyer and for some time as command ship for motor torpedo boat flotillas until struck from the Italian Naval Vessel Register in January 1971. After 1971 she was used for turbine instruction for naval cadets, one of her propellers – with the name Woodworth inscribed – stands on a plinth in front of the naval school of Cala Chiesa, La Maddalena, Sardinia. After being used for sometime for educational purposes at La Maddalena, she was taken to the La Spezia Naval Base in 1981. On 27 May 1983, she was once again taken in tow out of the Gulf of La Spezia and sunk by an experimental torpedo by the submarine Nazario Sauro.
