= Fante-class destroyer =

Destroyers of the Italian Navy

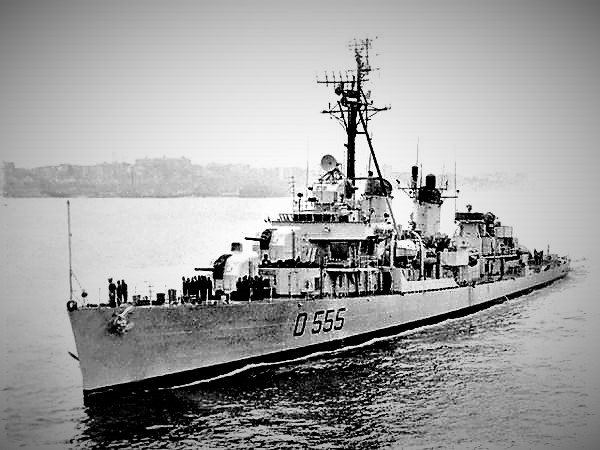
- Geniere

Class overview
- Name: Fante class
- Builders: Bath Iron Works; Tampa Shipbuilding Company
- Operators: Italian Navy
- Preceded by: Artigliere class
- Succeeded by: Audace class
- Subclasses: Fletcher class
- Built: 1941-1943
- In commission: 1969-1977
- Planned: 3
- Completed: 3
- Retired: 3

General characteristics
- Type: Destroyer
- Displacement: 2,050 long tons (2,083 t) standard; 2,500 long tons (2,540 t) full
- Length: 376.5 ft (114.8 m)
- Beam: 39.5 ft 10 in (12.29 m)
- Draft: 17.5 ft 8 in (5.54 m)
- Propulsion: 4 × GM Mod. 16-278A diesel engines with electric drive, 60,000 shp (45 MW); 2 × screws
- Speed: 36.5 knots (67.6 km/h; 42.0 mph)
- Range: 5,500 nmi (10,200 km) at 15 kn (28 km/h; 17 mph)
- Complement: 329
- Sensors & processing systems: 1 × AN/SPS-6 air-search radar; 1 × AN/SPS-10 surface-search radar; 1 × Mark 37 Director
- Armament: (Fante and Lanciere): 2 × single 5"/38 cal guns; 1 × RUR-4 Weapon Alpha; 3 × twin Mark 33 3"/50 cal guns; 2 × triple Mark 32 torpedo tubes; 2 × Mark 10 Hedgehog mortars; 1 × depth charge track; (Geniere): 4 × single 5"/38 cal guns; 3 × twin Mark 33 3"/50 cal guns; 2 × triple Mark 32 torpedo tubes; 2 × Mark 10 Hedgehog mortars; 1 × depth charge track

The Fante class was a class of 3 destroyers by the Italian Navy. They entered service in 1969, with the last one being decommissioned in 1977.

== History ==
The Fante class of destroyers of the Italian Navy consisted of three units belonging to the United States Navy of the Fletcher class that Italy bought from the United States in 1969–1970, in order to replace the destroyers of the Artigliere class. The ships underwent changes compared to their original armament, and being very worn ships, served only for five years, except the Lanciere which was immediately disarmed and cannibalized to provide spare parts for her two sisters.

The ships purchased were in fact initially two, the USS Walker (Fante) and USS Taylor (Lanciere) who joined the Navy in June 1969. The disastrous conditions of the second ship, however, led to purchase in January 1970 a third unit, the USS Prichett (Geniere). The Lanciere, therefore, was reused to supply spare parts to the two sister units.

== Ships in the class ==
Pennant	Name	Builders	Laid down	Launched	Commissioned	Decommissioned
D 561	Fante	Bath Iron Works	31 August 1942	31 January 1943	2 July 1969	1977
D 555	Geniere	Seattle-Tacoma Shipbuilding Corporation	20 July 1942	31 July 1943	17 January 1970	1975
D 560	Lanciere	Bath Iron Works	28 August 1941	7 June 1942	2 July 1969	January 1971

== See also ==
- List of destroyer classes

Equivalent destroyers of the same era

- Perth class
- Type 82
- Mod Kashin class
- Daegu class
- Minegumo class
