= Aldebaran-class frigate =

Frigates of the Italian Navy

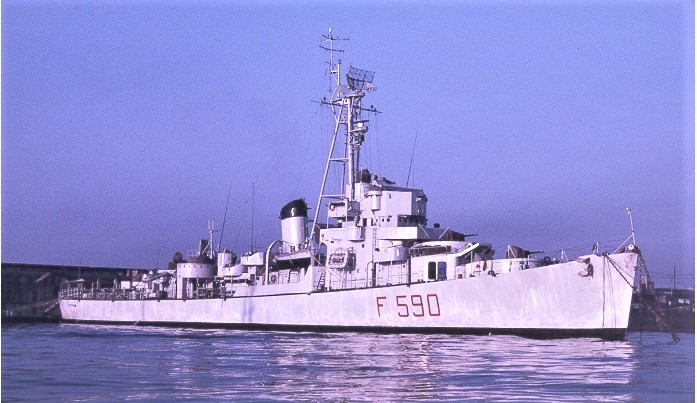
- Aldebaran

Class overview
- Name: Aldebaran
- Builders: Federal Shipbuilding and Drydock Company; Tampa Shipbuilding Company
- Operators: Italian Navy
- Preceded by: N/A
- Succeeded by: Centauro class
- Subclasses: Cannon class
- Built: 1943
- In commission: 1951-1976
- Planned: 3
- Completed: 3
- Retired: 3

General characteristics
- Type: Frigate; Corvette; Destroyer escort
- Displacement: 1,240 long tons (1,260 t) standard; 1,620 long tons (1,646 t) full
- Length: 306 ft (93 m) o/a; 300 ft (91 m) w/l
- Beam: 36 ft 10 in (11.23 m)
- Draft: 11 ft 8 in (3.56 m)
- Propulsion: 4 × GM Mod. 16-278A diesel engines with electric drive, 6,000 shp (4,474 kW), 2 screws
- Speed: 21 knots (39 km/h; 24 mph)
- Range: 10,800 nmi (20,000 km) at 12 kn (22 km/h; 14 mph)
- Complement: 15 officers and 201 enlisted
- Armament: 3 × single Mk.22 3"/50 caliber guns; 1 × twin 40 mm Mk.1 AA gun; 8 × 20 mm Mk.4 AA guns; 3 × 21 inch (533 mm) torpedo tubes; 1 × Hedgehog Mk.10 anti-submarine mortar (144 rounds); 8 × Mk.6 depth charge projectors; 2 × Mk.9 depth charge tracks

The Aldebaran class was a class of three frigates/corvettes/destroyer escorts operated by the Italian Navy. They entered service in 1951, with the last one being decommissioned in 1976.

== History ==
The Aldebaran class consisted of three former United States Navy ships: USS Thornhill (Aldebaran), USS Gandy (Altair) and USS Wesson (Andromeda) transferred to the Italian Navy in 1951. These ships in the United States Navy were classified as destroyer escorts and belonged to the Cannon class, built in large series during the Second World War and then supplied in several different marine units (Mutual Defense Assistance Program).

The three ships entered service in the Navy together with the Artigliere-class units as part of a naval upgrade program started in 1950; they were first used as escorts, from 1957 as frigates and from 1962 as corvettes, a role held until the moment of decommissioning.

Units of this class take their names from three Spica-class torpedo boats lost during World War II.

== Ships in the class ==
Pennant	Name	Builders	Laid down	Launched	Commissioned	Decommissioned
F 590	Aldebaran	Federal Shipbuilding and Drydock Company	7 October 1943	30 December 1943	10 January 1951	1976
F 591	Altair	Tampa Shipbuilding Company	1 March 1943	12 December 1943	10 January 1951	1971
F 592	Andromeda	Federal Shipbuilding and Drydock Company	29 July 1943	17 October 1943	10 January 1951	January 1972
