= Italian ship Andromeda =

Andromeda was the name of at least two ships of the Italian Navy and may refer to:

- Italian torpedo boat Andromeda, a Spica-class torpedo boat launched in 1936 and sunk in 1941.
- Italian frigate Andromeda (F 592), a Cannon-class destroyer escort launched in 1943 as USS Wesson. Transferred to Italy and renamed in 1951. Re-rated as a frigate in 1957 and scrapped in 1972.
