= USS Gillespie =

Benson-class destroyer

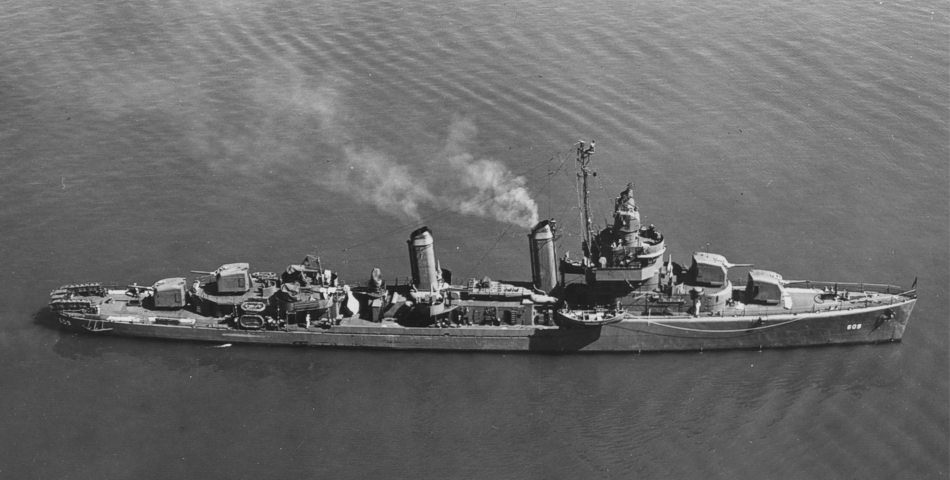
- USS Gillespie (DD-609) at anchor on 10 October 1942

History

United States
- Name: USS Gillespie (DD-609)
- Namesake: Archibald H. Gillespie
- Builder: Bethlehem Shipbuilding Corporation, San Francisco, California
- Launched: 8 May 1942
- Commissioned: 18 September 1942
- Decommissioned: 17 April 1946
- Stricken: 1 July 1971
- Fate: Sunk as a target in 1973

General characteristics
- Class & type: Benson-class destroyer
- Displacement: 1,620 tons
- Length: 348 ft 4 in (106.17 m)
- Beam: 36 ft 1 in (11.00 m)
- Draught: 11 ft 9 in (3.58 m)
- Speed: 35 knots (64.8 km/h)
- Complement: 261
- Armament: 4 x 5 in (130 mm)/38 guns, 7 x 20 mm, 5 x 21 inch (533 mm) tt., 6 dcp.

USS Gillespie (DD-609) was a Benson-class destroyer in the United States Navy during World War II. She was named for Major Archibald H. Gillespie.

== Construction and commissioning ==
Gillespie was launched 1 November 1942 by the Bethlehem Steel Corporation, San Francisco, California; sponsored by Mrs. Hugo W. Osterhaus, wife of Rear Admiral Hugo W. Osterhaus; and commissioned 18 September 1942.

== 1942 and 1943 ==
After shakedown, the destroyer sailed from San Francisco 28 December 1942 for the fog-shrouded Aleutian Islands and reached Sand Bay, Great Sitkin Island, 9 January 1943. After conducting escort, ASW, and patrolling duties among the scattered Aleutians, she saw her first action 18 February when, with Indianapolis and Richmond, she bombarded Attu Island, without return fire. The destroyer shot over 400 rounds of 5-inch into Japanese installations at Holtz Bay and Chichagof Harbor, and on the evening of the same day began an anti-shipping patrol southwest of Attu with Indianapolis and Coghlan. At 2225, Coglan's lookouts spotted smoke on the horizon and Gillespie responded. The smoking ship was Akagane Maru, a 3100-ton cargo ship bound for Attu with troops, munitions, and supplies, but she was not to close her port of call. She answered Indianapolis' challenge in Japanese Morse code; the American warships opened fire at 2316 and scored repeatedly. Within 3 minutes, the cargo ship was burning forward; a salvo by Indianapolis set her afire from stem to stern. Malfunctioning torpedoes failed to sink the gutted ship, but she finally slid under at 0126 20 February in 53-05 N, 171-22 E.

After further patrolling, Gillespie returned to San Francisco 4 March for overhaul and subsequently sailed via San Diego, California and the Panama Canal to moor at New York 11 April 1943. Through the spring, summer, and fall of 1943 the destroyer made four round-trip transatlantic escort voyages to Casablanca, French Morocco, and return, shepherding troop and cargo ships to the North African theater.

== 1944 ==
On 2 January 1944, she departed Norfolk, Virginia for the Pacific, reaching Funafuti atoll 20 days later, and escorting troop ships thence to Milne Bay, New Guinea, where she put in 7 February. As part of the 7th Fleet the destroyer supported the consolidation of Saidor in late February and escorted LSTs from Cape Sudest, New Guinea, to Cape Gloucester, New Britain, and Los Negros in the Admiralty Islands. On 6 March, the LSTs made landings in Hayne Bay, Los Negros, while Gillespie patrolled from five to fifteen miles off the northeast coast. While acting as a call fire ship for Army forces in Seeadler Harbor, Manus Island, she bombarded the eastern tip of Pityilu Island on 14 March and until the 16th continued to support the Manus assault by bombarding installations and gun emplacements on Manus. On 24–25 March, Gillespie bombarded targets on Pityilu, Manus, and Rambutyo Islands, returning to Oro Bay, New Guinea, 26 March.

Training exercises and patrolling occupied her until 27 May, when she lent fire support for the initial landings on Biak Island. From 31 May to 2 June 1944, she served as a fighter director and warning picket off Biak, and bombarded that island. Gillespie came under repeated air attacks, but escaped damage or casualties. Duties in New Guinean waters continued; 5–6 July she bombarded positions on the west coast of Noemfoor Island to speed the advance of the 6th Army toward the Namber Drone area, and 20 July her 5-inchers attacked Insomeken Point and Arimi Island on the east coast of Noemfoor following the initial landings.

Through the summer of 1944, the destroyer continued patrolling and training exercises off New Guinea and the Solomon Islands, and was on hand from 15 September to 14 October for screening activities during the amphibious assault on Peleliu in the Palau Islands. Gillespie sailed 14 October 1944 for overhaul at Bremerton, Washington, mooring there 5 November, and after refresher training, sailed from San Diego 3 January 1945. She conducted training exercises at Pearl Harbor and closed Ulithi 8 February, and subsequently as part of the Logistic Support Forces she escorted supply ships and units of the 5th Fleet during the seizure of Iwo Jima.

== 1945, end of World War II and fate ==
From 13 March to 28 May 1945, Gillespie participated in the landings and occupation of Okinawa and adjacent islands of the Nansei-Shoto group. 8 April the destroyer came under attack by two Japanese kamikazes, the first of which tried to hit her. At dawn, just before 0600, an enemy fighter swooped down and Gillespie's 5-inch battery opened fire at a range of 9,800 yards. As the plane closed the 2,500 yards, her automatic weapons took up the hail of fire and the destroyer turned hard to port to keep the batteries unmasked. The smoking plane passed low over the fantail and made an abrupt wingover in an attempt to crash the ship, but the plane spun off into the sea. Minutes later, another plane came in and was quickly downed. The destroyer put in at Ulithi 31 May, and from 1 July to 15 August 1945 she screened other warships during the pre-invasion bombardment of the Japanese home islands. From 16 August to 2 September she continued her escort and patrolling duties, and anchored in Tokyo Bay 10 September 1945. Underway once more 12 October, she sailed via Manila and Pearl Harbor to moor at San Diego 23 November, and steamed thence to close Boston, Massachusetts 11 December.

Following overhaul there, she reached Charleston, South Carolina, 14 January 1946 and she decommissioned at that port 17 April 1946. In reserve, she was assigned to the Texas Group, U.S. Atlantic Reserve Fleet, Orange, Texas. She was struck from the Naval Vessel Register on 1 July 1971 and sunk as a target in 1973.

== Awards ==
Gillespie earned nine battle stars during World War II.
