= Benson-class destroyer =

U.S. Navy ship class (built 1939–1943)

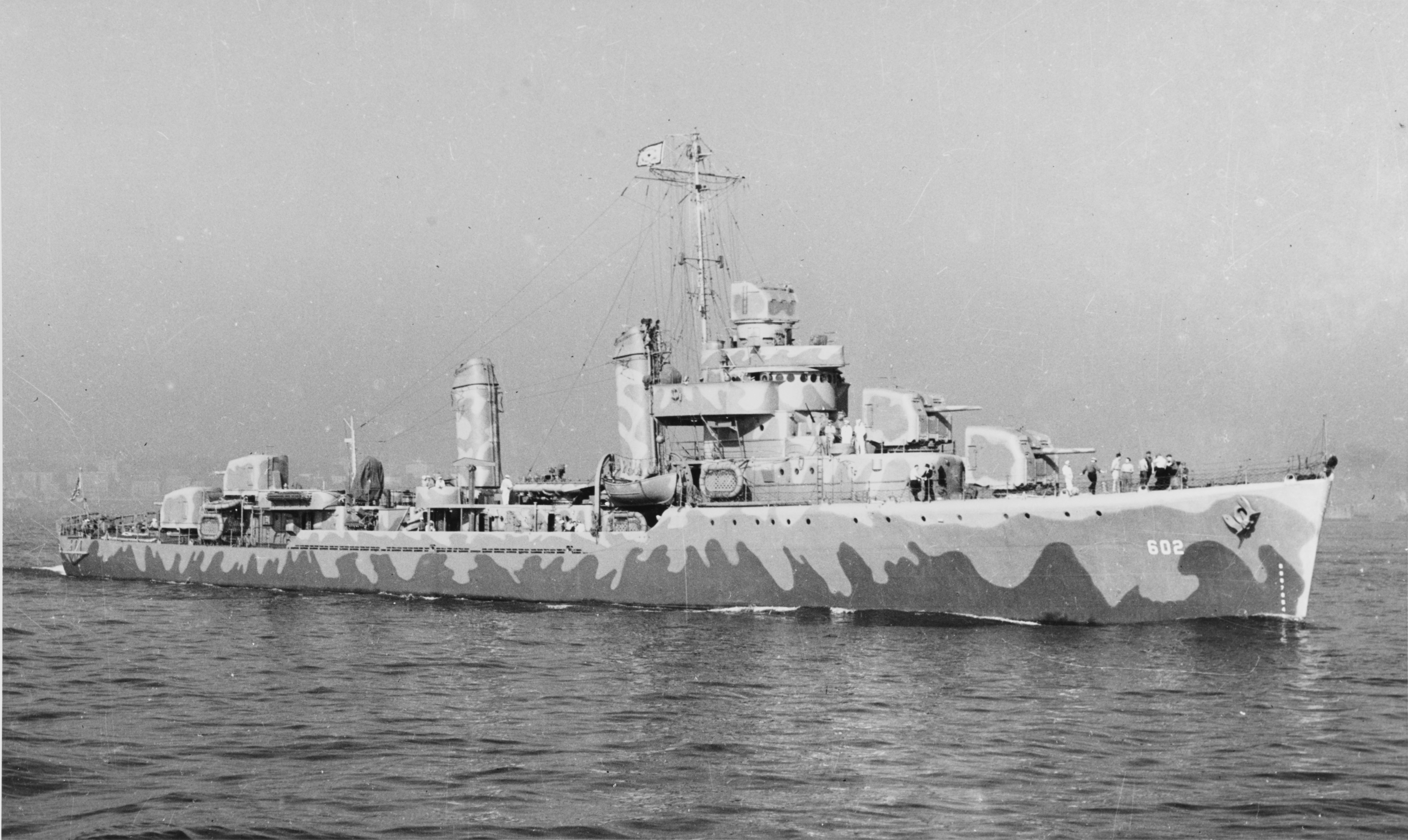
- USS Meade on 20 June 1942

Class overview
- Name: Benson class
- Builders: Bethlehem; Fore River, MA (8); Staten Island, NY (5); San Pedro, CA (4); San Francisco, CA (9); Boston Navy Yard, MA (2); Charleston Navy Yard, SC (1); Puget Sound Navy Yard, WA (1)
- Operators: United States Navy; Italian Navy; Republic of China Navy
- Preceded by: Sims class
- Succeeded by: Gleaves class
- Subclasses: Bristol class; Artigliere class
- Built: 1938–43
- In commission: 1940–51
- Completed: 30
- Lost: 4 (1 returned to service)
- Retired: 27

General characteristics
- Type: Destroyer
- Displacement: 1620 tons standard, 2474 tons full load
- Length: 341 ft (103.9 m) waterline, 348 ft 2 in (106.12 m) overall
- Beam: 36 ft 1 in (11.00 m)
- Draft: 11 ft 9 in (3.58 m) (normal), 17 ft 9 in (5.41 m) (full load)
- Installed power: 4 Babcock & Wilcox boilers, 2 Bethlehem Steel geared steam turbines; 50,000 shp (37,000 kW)
- Propulsion: 2 shafts
- Speed: 37.5 knots (69.5 km/h); 33 knots (61.1 km/h) full load
- Range: 6,500 nautical miles (12,000 km; 7,500 mi) at 12 kn (22 km/h; 14 mph)
- Complement: 208 (276 wartime)
- Sensors & processing systems: Mk37 GFCS; 1 × SC radar
- Armament: As designed: 5 × 5 in (127 mm) DP guns, 6 × 0.50 in. (12.7 mm) guns, 10 × 21-inch (533 mm) torpedo tubes (2 × 5), 10 torpedoes; 2 × depth charge tracks; DD-459 onward: 4 × 5 in (127 mm) DP guns, 4 × 40 mm Bofors guns (2 × 2), 7 × Oerlikon 20 mm cannons, 5 × 21 in (533 mm) torpedo tubes (1 × 5), 4–6 × K-gun depth charge throwers, 2 × depth charge tracks
- Notes: Ship data sources: Destroyers.org, Friedman, pp. 95–104, 470–471

The Benson class was a class of destroyers of the U.S. Navy built 1939–1943. The thirty 1,620-ton Benson-class destroyers were built in two groups. The first six were authorized in fiscal year 1938 (FY38) and laid down at Bethlehem Steel, Quincy, Massachusetts, and three naval shipyards. The remaining 24 "repeat Bensons" were authorized in 1940–42 and built at four Bethlehem Steel yards. They were laid down after the first group was commissioned. These plus the "repeat Livermores" (also known as "repeat Gleaveses") were also known at the time as the Bristol class. During World War II the Bensons were usually combined with the Livermores (more correctly the Gleaves class) as the Benson-Livermore class; this persisted in references until at least the 1960s. In some references both classes are combined and called the Benson class. The Benson- and Gleaves-class destroyers were the backbone of the pre-war Neutrality Patrols and participated in every major campaign of the war.

== Namesake ==
The lead ship of the class was named after William Shepherd Benson, a graduate of the Naval Academy in 1877. He commanded USS Albany, USS Missouri, USS Utah, and the Philadelphia Navy Yard. Benson was appointed first Chief of Naval Operations in 1915 and then served as CNO until he retired 25 September 1919. He died in Washington, D.C., 20 May 1932.

== Related classes ==
The Bensons were originally envisioned as a single class of 24 ships, the first eight of which were ordered in fiscal year 1938 (FY38). Six of these were designed by Bethlehem Shipbuilding, to be built at Bethlehem's Fore River and at several government yards (as mandated by Congress), and two were designed by Gibbs & Cox, to be built at Bath Iron Works. All were to have 600 psi (4,100 kPa) steam (references vary) superheated to 750 °F (399 °C), with cruising turbines and double-reduction gearing to maximize fuel efficiency. After contract award, Bethlehem requested that their design be modified to use less-complex single-reduction gears and no cruising turbines. Bethlehem claimed they could achieve comparable fuel efficiency with the simpler machinery. This request was granted, but FY39 and FY40 ships, beginning with Livermore, would use the more complex machinery. So the class was known through World War II as the Benson-Livermore class, and this name persisted in many references until at least the 1960s. In the spring of 1938 the Navy's Bureau of Steam Engineering requested that the FY39 and FY40 ships be modified for 850 °F (454 °C) superheat. It proved possible for Bath to build their two FY38 ships, Gleaves and Niblack, to the new design. Gleaves was completed prior to Livermore and had a lower hull number, thus the class name is more correctly the Benson-Gleaves class.

The only external difference between the Benson and Gleaves classes was the shape of the stacks; the Bensons' were flat-sided and the Gleaveses' were round.

After the Fall of France in 1940, and before the outcome of the looming Battle of Britain was certain, a rapid expansion of the Navy was envisioned. As not all facilities were equipped to produce the new Fletcher-class destroyers or because of other concerns, an additional 72 "repeat" Benson- and Gleaves-class ships were ordered in FY41. 24 repeat Bensons were built by several Bethlehem yards, while an additional 48 repeat Gleaveses were built by various other builders. These were initially called the Bristol class after Bristol, a repeat Gleaves and the first of these to be completed, although the machinery of the repeat Bensons was different from the repeat Gleaveses. The repeat ships were ordered with reduced torpedo and gun armament and increased anti-submarine and light anti-aircraft armament.

In some references the Benson and Gleaves classes are combined as the Benson class.

The Budget for the United States Government (as published) for fiscal year 41, starting on 1 July 1940 called for 8 destroyers to be built, and they were originally contemplated to be DD-445 ... DD-452, i.e. Fletchers. In June 1940, 8 Gleaves were ordered instead.

== Design ==
The Benson class was designed as an improved version of the Sims class with two stacks and a new "echeloned" machinery arrangement that featured alternating boiler and engine rooms, designed to give the ships a better chance at surviving torpedo damage. Loss of one compartment, or even two adjacent compartments, would no longer disable the entire propulsion system. They also introduced quintuple torpedo tube mounts. Their scantlings, or framing dimensions, were increased to carry the weight of the new machinery. This increased the ships' displacement by about sixty tons, to 1620 tons standard displacement.

=== Engineering ===
The Bensons were all completed with "M"-type boilers, 600 psi (4,100 kPa) steam (references vary) superheated to 750 °F (399 °C), single-reduction gearing, and no cruising turbines. The main steam turbines were designed and built by Bethlehem Steel.

== Armament ==
The class was completed with four or five 5-inch (127 mm) dual purpose guns (anti-surface and anti-aircraft (AA)), controlled by a Mark 37 Gun Fire Control System as in the previous Sims class. The introduction of two centerline quintuple torpedo tube mounts in this class was a significant improvement and was continued in subsequent World War II classes. This allowed a broadside of ten tubes with savings in space and weight compared to previous classes, which had twelve or sixteen tubes and an eight-tube broadside. However, most of the Bensons spent most of the war with only five torpedo tubes equipped in favor of greater light anti-aircraft armament. This varied considerably in different ships as the war went on; for example, the specified pair of twin 40 mm (1.6 in) guns were not widely available until mid-1942 and a quadruple 1.1 in (28 mm) machine cannon mount and a 20 mm (0.79 in) gun were temporarily substituted. In 1945 twelve ships (DD-600-601, 603–604, 608, 610, and DD-612-617) were modified for maximum light AA armament as an anti-kamikaze measure, with four 5-inch guns, no torpedo tubes, twelve 40 mm guns in two quad and two twin mounts and four 20 mm guns in two twin mounts. The first six ships landed a torpedo tube mount early in the war while on Atlantic service, but as they were transferred to the Pacific in early 1945 they were re-equipped with the torpedoes at the cost of a 5-inch gun. Photographs indicate that, as with most pre-1942 destroyers, the initial anti-submarine armament of two depth charge tracks was augmented with four or six K-gun depth charge throwers in 1941–42 on most ships.

== Service ==
The first six ships of the class began their careers on Neutrality Patrols, and after the attack on Pearl Harbor and the US entry into World War II continued to serve in the Atlantic and Mediterranean, supporting operations in North Africa, Italy, and southern France until transferred to the Pacific in early 1945. Several of the remaining ships spent the entire war in the Atlantic and Mediterranean. Others served entirely in the Pacific, at first in the Solomon Islands or Aleutians and later in other campaigns. Three were lost in the war; two in the Pacific and one in the Mediterranean. A fourth lost the bow section but was rebuilt and returned to service. After the war the survivors were decommissioned and placed in the Reserve Fleet in 1946–47; one was transferred to Italy and two were transferred to Taiwan in the 1950s. Modernization was considered in the 1950s but not implemented except on the transferred ships. The remainder were scrapped or otherwise disposed of in the late 60s and early 70s.

== Losses ==
USS Laffey and USS Barton were lost at the Naval Battle of Guadalcanal on 13 November 1942; USS Lansdale was lost to air attack in the Mediterranean Sea on 20 April 1944. Additionally, the bow section of USS Murphy was cut off in a collision with the tanker SS Bulkoil 75 nautical miles (139 km; 86 mi) from New York on 21 October 1943 and sank with the loss of 38 crew. The rest of the ship was saved and was rebuilt and returned to service; thus Murphy was not officially considered lost.

== Decorations ==
USS Laffey received a Presidential Unit Citation for her role in the Battle of Guadalcanal. USS Bailey received a Navy Unit Commendation for her service in the Battle of the Komandorski Islands, 26 March 1943. Also, USS Hilary P. Jones received a Navy Unit Commendation for her actions in the final operations in the Mediterranean Sea in September 1944.

== Ships in class ==
Ships of the Benson destroyer class
Name	Hull no.	Builder	Laid down	Launched	Commissioned	Decommissioned	Fate
Benson	DD-421	Bethlehem Steel Corporation, Fore River Shipyard, Quincy, Massachusetts	16 May 1938	15 November 1939	25 July 1940	18 March 1946	Transferred to Republic of China, 26 February 1954
Mayo	DD-422	Bethlehem Steel Corporation, Fore River Shipyard, Quincy, Massachusetts	16 May 1938	26 March 1940	18 September 1940	18 March 1946	Sold for scrap, 8 May 1972
Madison	DD-425	Boston Navy Yard	19 September 1938	20 October 1939	6 August 1940	13 March 1946	Sunk as target, 14 October 1969
Lansdale	DD-426	Boston Navy Yard	19 September 1938	30 October 1939	17 September 1940	—N/a	Sunk by the Luftwaffe, 20 April 1944
Hilary P. Jones	DD-427	Charleston Navy Yard	16 May 1938	14 December 1939	6 September 1940	6 February 1947	Loaned to Taiwan, 26 February 1954
Charles F. Hughes	DD-428	Puget Sound Naval Shipyard	3 January 1939	16 May 1940	6 September 1940	18 March 1946	Sunk as target, 26 March 1969
Laffey	DD-459	Bethlehem Shipbuilding Corporation, San Francisco, California	13 January 1941	30 October 1941	31 March 1942	—N/a	Sunk in First Naval Battle of Guadalcanal, 13 November 1942
Woodworth	DD-460	Bethlehem Shipbuilding Corporation, San Francisco, California	30 April 1941	29 November 1941	30 April 1942; 21 November 1950	11 April 1946; 14 January 1951	Transferred to Italy, 11 June 1951
Farenholt	DD-491	Bethlehem Staten Island, Staten Island, New York	11 December 1940	19 November 1941	2 April 1942	26 April 1946	Sold for scrap, 22 November 1972
Bailey	DD-492	Bethlehem Staten Island, Staten Island, New York	29 January 1941	19 December 1941	11 May 1942	2 May 1948	Sunk as target, 4 November 1969
Bancroft	DD-598	Bethlehem Steel Corporation, Fore River Shipyard, Quincy, Massachusetts	1 May 1941	31 December 1941	30 April 1942	1 February 1946	Sold for scrap, 16 March 1973
Barton	DD-599	Bethlehem Steel Corporation, Fore River Shipyard, Quincy, Massachusetts	20 May 1941	31 January 1942	29 May 1942	—N/a	Sunk by Amatsukaze, First Naval Battle of Guadalcanal, 13 November 1942
Boyle	DD-600	Bethlehem Steel Corporation, Fore River Shipyard, Quincy, Massachusetts	31 December 1941	15 June 1942	15 August 1942	29 March 1946	Sunk as target, 3 May 1973
Champlin	DD-601	Bethlehem Steel Corporation, Fore River Shipyard, Quincy, Massachusetts	31 January 1942	25 July 1942	12 September 1942	31 January 1947	Sold for scrap, 8 May 1972
Meade	DD-602	Bethlehem Staten Island, Staten Island, New York	25 March 1941	15 February 1942	22 June 1942	17 June 1946	Sunk as target, 18 February 1973
Murphy	DD-603	Bethlehem Staten Island, Staten Island, New York	19 May 1941	29 April 1942	23 July 1942	9 March 1946	Bow section sunk in collision with SS Bulkoil 75 miles (121 km) outside New York, 21 October 1943. Ship rebuilt and returned to service. Sold for scrap, 6 October 1972
Parker	DD-604	Bethlehem Staten Island, Staten Island, New York	9 June 1941	12 May 1942	31 August 1942	31 January 1947	Sold for scrap, 25 May 1973
Caldwell	DD-605	Bethlehem Shipbuilding Corporation, San Francisco, California	24 March 1941	15 January 1942	10 June 1942	24 April 1946	Sold for scrap, 4 November 1966
Coghlan	DD-606	Bethlehem Shipbuilding Corporation, San Francisco, California	28 March 1941	12 February 1942	10 July 1942	31 March 1947	Sold for scrap, 12 June 1974
Frazier	DD-607	Bethlehem Shipbuilding Corporation, San Francisco, California	5 July 1941	17 March 1942	30 July 1942	15 April 1946	Sold for scrap, 6 October 1972
Gansevoort	DD-608	Bethlehem Shipbuilding Corporation, San Francisco, California	16 June 1941	11 April 1942	25 August 1942	1 February 1946	Sunk as target, 23 March 1972
Gillespie	DD-609	Bethlehem Shipbuilding Corporation, San Francisco, California	16 June 1941	8 May 1942	18 September 1942	17 April 1946	Sunk as target, 16 July 1973
Hobby	DD-610	Bethlehem Shipbuilding Corporation, San Francisco, California	30 June 1941	4 June 1942	18 November 1942	1 February 1946	Sunk as target, 1 June 1972
Kalk	DD-611	Bethlehem Shipbuilding Corporation, San Francisco, California	30 June 1941	18 July 1942	17 October 1942	3 May 1946	Sunk as target, 20 March 1969
Kendrick	DD-612	Bethlehem Shipbuilding, San Pedro, California, Terminal Island	1 May 1941	2 April 1942	12 September 1942	31 March 1947	Sunk as target, 2 March 1968
Laub	DD-613	Bethlehem Shipbuilding, San Pedro, California, Terminal Island	1 May 1941	28 April 1942	24 October 1942	2 February 1946	Sold for scrap, 14 January 1975
MacKenzie	DD-614	Bethlehem Shipbuilding, San Pedro, California, Terminal Island	29 May 1941	27 June 1942	21 November 1942	4 February 1946	Sunk as target, 1 June 1974
McLanahan	DD-615	Bethlehem Shipbuilding, San Pedro, California, Terminal Island	29 May 1941	2 September 1942	19 December 1942	2 February 1946	Sold for scrap, 1 June 1974
Nields	DD-616	Bethlehem Steel Corporation, Fore River Shipyard, Quincy, Massachusetts	15 June 1942	1 October 1942	15 January 1943	25 March 1946	Sold for scrap, 8 May 1972
Ordronaux	DD-617	Bethlehem Steel Corporation, Fore River Shipyard, Quincy, Massachusetts	25 July 1942	9 November 1942	13 February 1943	27 March 1946	Sold for scrap, 16 March 1973

== Other Navies ==
=== Republic of China (Taiwan) ===
Pennant	Ship name	Former name	Acquired	Fate
DD-14	ROCS Lo Yang	USS Benson	26 February 1954	struck in 1975, scrapped
DD-15	ROCS Han Yang	USS Hilary P. Jones	26 February 1954	struck in 1974, scrapped

=== Italy ===
Pennant	Ship name	Former name	Acquired	Fate
D 553	Artigliere	USS Woodworth	1951	struck in 1971, scrapped

== See also ==
- Livermore class destroyer
- List of destroyers of the United States Navy
- List of destroyer classes of the United States Navy
- List of ship classes of World War II
