= Artigliere-class destroyer =

Destroyers of the Italian Navy

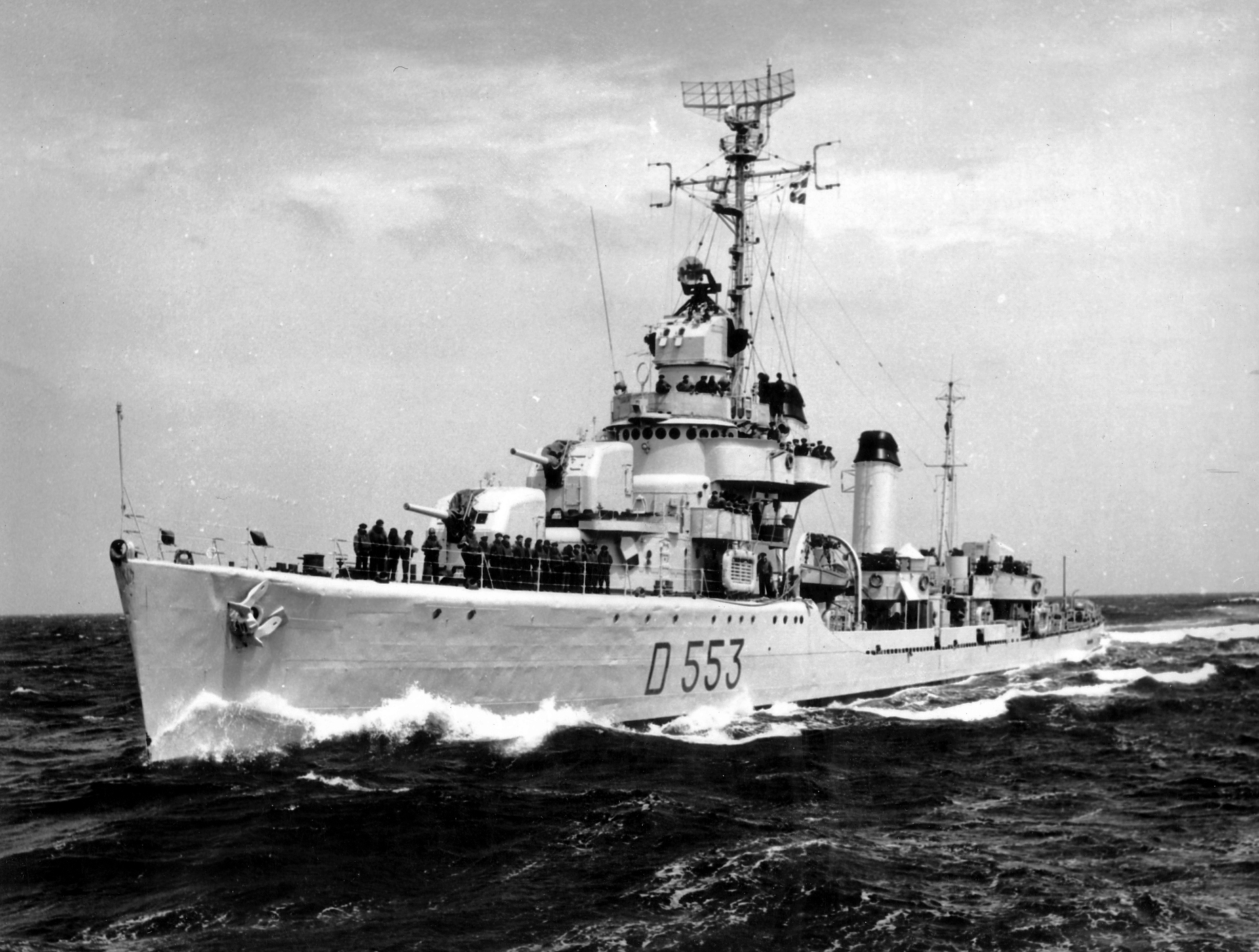
- Artigliere

Class overview
- Name: Artigliere class
- Builders: Union Iron Works; Boston Navy Yard
- Operators: Italian Navy
- Preceded by: Soldati class
- Succeeded by: Fante class
- Subclasses: Benson class; Gleaves class
- Built: 1939-1941
- In commission: 1951-1975
- Planned: 2
- Completed: 2
- Retired: 2

General characteristics
- Type: Destroyer
- Displacement: (Artigliere): 1,620 long tons (1,646 t); (Aviere): 2,500 long tons (2,540 t)
- Length: (Artigliere): 347 ft 9 in (105.99 m); (Aviere): 376.5 ft (114.8 m)
- Beam: 36 ft 1 in (11.00 m)
- Draft: (Artigliere): 17.4 ft 8 in (5.51 m); (Aviere): 13 ft 2 in (4.01 m)
- Propulsion: 4 × boilers, 50,000 shp (37 MW); 2 × screws
- Speed: (Artigliere): 37.6 knots (69.6 km/h; 43.3 mph); (Aviere): 35 knots (65 km/h; 40 mph)
- Range: 6,500 nmi (12,000 km) at 12 kn (22 km/h; 14 mph)
- Complement: 276
- Sensors & processing systems: 1 × AN/SPS-6 air-search radar; 1 × AN/SPS-10 surface-search radar; 1 × Mark 37 Director
- Armament: 4 × single 5"/38 cal guns; 4 × twin 40 mm bofors; 2 × single 40 mm bofors; 2 × Depth charge tracks

The Artigliere class was a class of two destroyers of the Italian Navy. They entered service in 1951, with the last one being decommissioned in 1975.

== History ==
The Artigliere-class destroyers consisted of two former United States Navy destroyers, purchased by the Italian Navy in 1951 as part of its post-war reconstruction phase. These were the Benson class USS Woodworth, which became Artigliere, and the Gleaves class USS Nicholson, which became Aviere. Although they were from two different US Navy classes, they had the same general characteristics, so much so that the class is often identified as the Livermore class.

The two ships of the class entered service together with the Aldebaran-class frigates as part of a naval upgrade program started in 1950, and although they dated back to the early 1940s, their four 127 mm/38 guns enhanced the artillery component of the Italian Navy. Surface naval vessels of the Italian Navy, at the same time were increasing their anti-aircraft capabilities. Along with weapons, the new electronic equipment for firing direction and air-naval surveillance also represented the starting point for personnel training on new generation systems that would later be adopted in a more widespread and generalized way.

== Ships in the class ==
| Pennant | Name | Builders | Laid down | Launched | Commissioned | Decommissioned |
|---|---|---|---|---|---|---|
| D 553 | Artigliere | Union Iron Works | 30 April 1941 | 29 November 1941 | 1951 | 1971 |
| D 554 | Aviere | Boston Navy Yard | 20 July 1942 | 31 July 1943 | 1951 | 1975 |

== See also ==
- List of destroyers of Italy

Equivalent destroyers of the same era

- Skory class
- Holland class
- Ayanami class
- Östergötland class
- Zerstörer 1 class
