= USS Prichett =

Fletcher-class destroyer

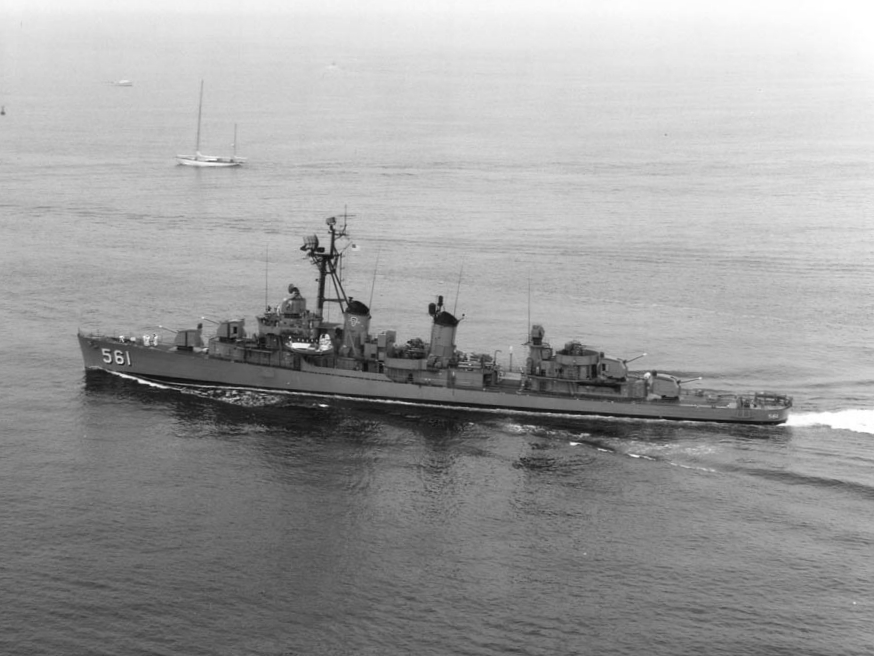
- USS Prichett (DD-561) underway in 1969

History

United States
- Name: Prichett
- Namesake: James M. Prichett
- Builder: Seattle-Tacoma Shipbuilding Corporation
- Laid down: 20 July 1942
- Launched: 31 July 1943
- Commissioned: 15 January 1944
- Decommissioned: 10 January 1970
- Stricken: 10 January 1970
- Identification: Hull number: DD-561
- Fate: Transferred to Italy, 17 January 1970

Italy
- Name: Geniere
- Acquired: 17 January 1970
- Stricken: 1975
- Identification: Pennant number: D 555
- Fate: Scrapped in 1975

General characteristics
- Class & type: Fletcher-class destroyer
- Displacement: 2,050 long tons (2,080 t)
- Length: 376 ft 6 in (114.76 m)
- Beam: 39 ft 8 in (12.09 m)
- Draft: 17 ft 9 in (5.41 m)
- Propulsion: 60,000 shp (45,000 kW); 2 propellers
- Speed: 35 knots (65 km/h; 40 mph)
- Range: 6,500 nmi (12,000 km; 7,500 mi) at 15 knots (28 km/h; 17 mph)
- Complement: 319
- Armament: 5 × 5 in (130 mm) guns; 4 × 40 mm AA guns; 4 × 20 mm AA guns; 10 × 21-inch (533 mm) torpedo tubes; 6 × depth charge projectors; 2 × depth charge tracks

USS Prichett (DD-561), was a Fletcher-class destroyer of the United States Navy.

== Namesake ==
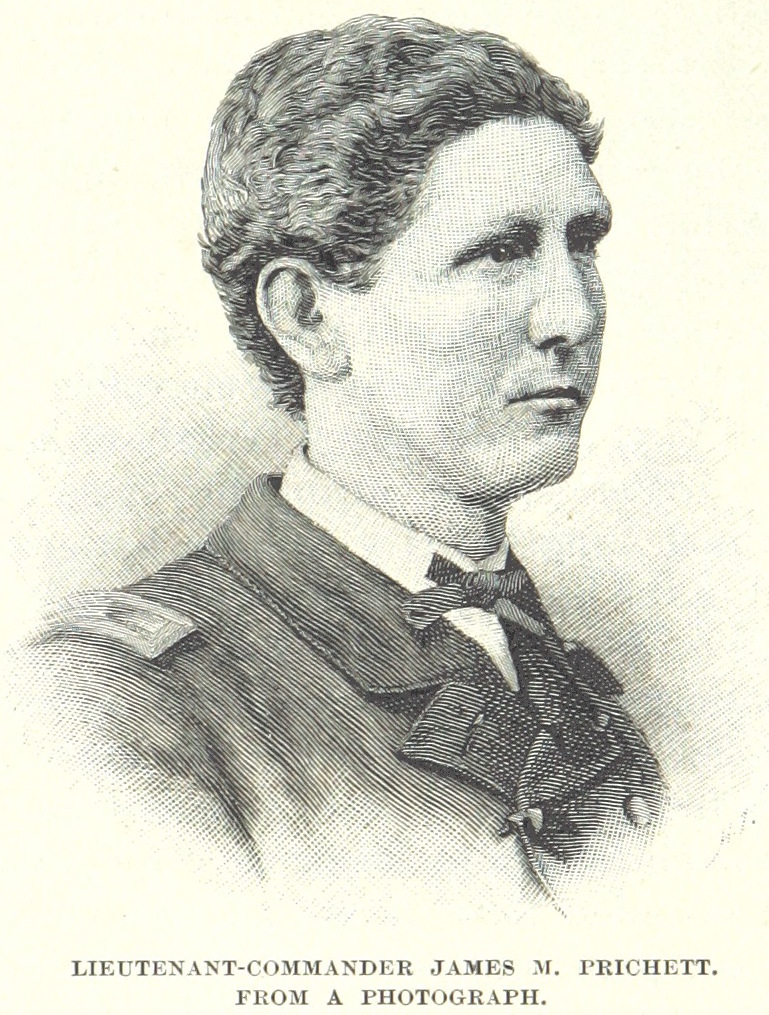
James M. Prichett

James M. Prichett was born in Centerville, Indiana in 1836. He graduated from the United States Naval Academy in 1857. Prior to the Civil War he served aboard the USS Mississippi on the China Station, and in USS Richmond on the Mediterranean Station.

Assigned to the Washington Navy Yard in 1861, Prichett joined the Naval forces on the Mississippi River in 1862. On 4 July 1863, while commanding the gunboat Tyler, he participated in, and won praise for, effective action in repulsing a superior Confederate force during the battle of Helena, Arkansas. He also commanded monitor USS Mahopac during the war. After the war he sailed with Admiral David Farragut's expedition to Russia and, in 1869, returned to the Pacific Squadron. Lieutenant Commander Prichett died in 1871 while attached to receiving ship USS Vermont at the Brooklyn Navy Yard.

== Construction and commissioning ==
Prichett was laid down 20 July 1942 by the Seattle-Tacoma Shipbuilding Co., Seattle, Washington; launched 31 July 1943, sponsored by Mrs. Orville A. Tucker; and commissioned 15 January 1944.

== Central Pacific campaigns ==
Following shakedown Prichett sailed, 1 April 1944, for Majuro, thence to Manus where she joined the battleships of Task Force 58 (TF 58). On the 28th, Task Group 58.3 (TG 58.3) sortied and, rendezvousing with the fast carriers, steamed northeast. On the 29th and 30th, they blasted Truk and, on 1 May, pounded Ponape. Then, the force retired to Majuro, whence Prichett returned to Pearl Harbor. There, fighter director equipment was installed and on 30 May she sailed west again, with TF 52 for the invasion of Saipan. Having screened the transports to the objective, she shifted her protective duties to the battleships as they bombarded the shore, then provided gunfire support to the troops landed on 15 June. During the Battle of the Philippine Sea she remained with the transports, then turned her guns on the neighboring Japanese-held island of Tinian. Remaining in the Marianas until mid-August, she alternated gunfire support duties, screening duties and radar picket duties off Saipan with bombardment of Tinian until that island was invaded 24 July, then provided support services for the troops fighting there. In August, she shifted to Guam to support mopping up operations and on the 17th got underway for Eniwetok to rejoin the fast carrier force, now designated TF 38.

Arriving on the 20th, she sortied with TG 38.3 on the 29th and for the next 28 days screened the carriers, and after 11 September, the battleships, as Japanese targets in the Palaus and the Philippines were pounded. Striking first at the Palaus to prepare for the mid-month invasion, the force then turned on Mindanao and the Central Philippines. Between the 15th and the 19th, they supported the Palau invasion, then struck at Luzon and the Visayas before retiring to Ulithi.

On 6 October, the force sortied again. The Nansei Shoto, Luzon and Formosa were the targets blasted in preparation for the return to the Philippines. Fired on, by mistake, by a unit of TG 38.4, while off Formosa, 12th–15th, Prichett retired to Manus for repairs and replenishment. From the Admiralties, she steamed to Ulithi and rejoined TG 38.3 for further strikes against Luzon and the Visayas. The force returned again to the same area at the end of November, to support fighting on Leyte, and in December, to support the Mindoro landings.

== Iwo Jima and Okinawa ==
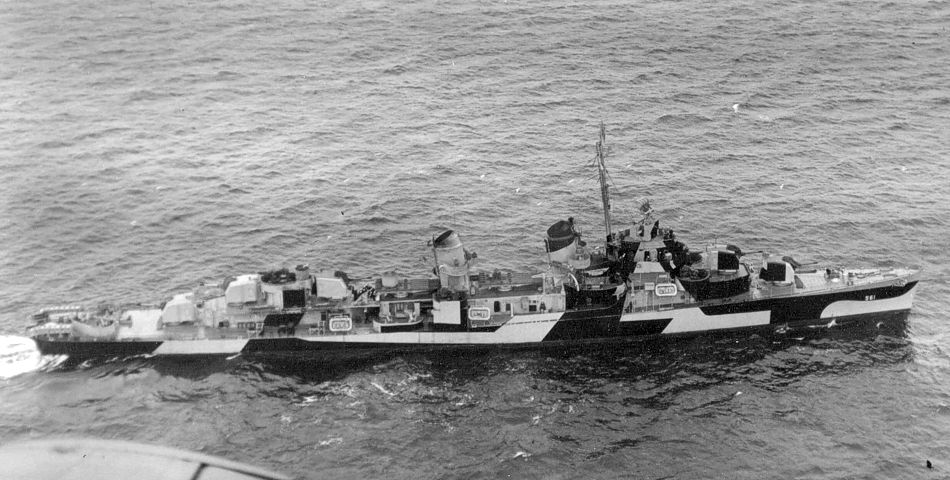
Prichett in 1944

On 30 December, the Ulithi logistics base was left behind again as the force steamed west to welcome the new year, 1945, with strikes against Luzon and Formosa. The ships then thrust into the South China Sea and hit enemy shipping and shore installations from Saigon to Formosa, and then struck at Okinawa. They then retired to Ulithi, replenished, rearmed, and, on 10 February, departed to raid the industrial complexes of Honshū. After striking Tokyo and Yokohama, the force turned back to cover the landings on Iwo Jima, 19 February. There Prichett was reassigned to Task Unit 52.2.5 (TU 52.2.5), with which she remained in the Iwo Jima–Chichi Jima area until 9 March.

By 12 March, the destroyer was back at Ulithi to prepare for the invasion of the last stepping stone to the enemy's home islands: Okinawa. Attached to Task Force 54 (TF 54), Prichett arrived off the objective 25 March to cover minesweeping and underwater demolition team operations. Preinvasion bombardment, harassment fire and fire support missions off Kerama Retto followed. On 1 April, she participated in the demonstration "feint" on southern Okinawa, then swung around to screen the transports off the Hagushi assault area.

Just after 01:00, 3 April, the Japanese commenced a long day of aerial resistance. At 01:42, Prichett, having beaten off several attacks, was closed by two bogies. The first veered off, but the second pressed on and dropped a 500-pound bomb on the fantail. Exploding close under the counter, it holed the destroyer below the waterline, causing flooding aft and a fire in the 20 mm. clipping room. The crippled destroyer, maintaining a speed in excess of 28 knots to minimize flooding and bringing the fire under control, remained in the area and continued to ward off enemy planes until relieved shortly before noon. She then retired to Kerama Retto for emergency repairs. On the 7th, she got underway for Guam where repairs were completed, and on 7 May she returned to Okinawa and radar picket duties. For almost 3 months she escaped further serious damage. However, on 29 July, while standing by Callaghan—a kamikaze victim—she became the target of a second suicide-minded Japanese pilot. Prichett took him under fire at 5,000 yards, but he bore on. Splashed into the sea approximately 6 feet off the destroyer's port side, his mission was partially accomplished as his lethal cargo exploded on impact, bowing in the ship's hull and causing extensive damage to her superstructure, port depth charge racks, and radio and power leads. Prichett, despite her damage, remained in the area and for another two hours continued to pick up survivors from Callaghan.

Awarded a Navy Unit Commendation for her actions off Okinawa, Prichett sailed for home 13 August. Arriving after the cessation of hostilities, she underwent deactivation overhaul at Puget Sound and on 14 March 1946 was decommissioned and berthed with the San Diego Group, Pacific Reserve Fleet.

== 1951–1954 ==
Reactivated after the invasion of the Republic of Korea by the North Korean People's Army, Prichett recommissioned 17 August 1951. Post activation shakedown off California followed and on 13 January 1952 she got underway for the Atlantic. Arriving at Norfolk, 2 February, she operated off the Mid-Atlantic seaboard until April, then underwent modernization at Boston. Emerging in November with the latest in anti-aircraft weaponry, fire control radar, sonar and communications gear, she became the flagship of Destroyer Division 282 (DesDiv 282). She completed further training in the Caribbean and departed Norfolk, 7 January 1953, for a tour in the Korean combat zone. Steaming via the Panama Canal, she arrived at Sasebo 11 February and on the 15th rendezvoused with TF 77. Between then and 23 June she performed plane guard and screening duties for the carriers of TF 77, screened battleships and cruisers during bombardment missions, and provided gunfire support, plane control, interdiction and harassment fire, and hospital ship services for United Nations Forces fighting in coastal areas, primarily near Wonsan, North Korea.

The Prichett returned to Norfolk via the Suez Canal, completing her round-the-world cruise 22 August. From 7 January to 11 March 1954 she deployed to the Mediterranean, then, after exercises in the Caribbean and shipyard availability, got underway, 5 January 1955, to return to the Pacific.

== 1955–1970 ==
Assigned to DesDiv 192, she reported to CinCPac 17 January 1955 and by May she was en route to Japan for her first West Pacific deployment since the Korean War. Homeported at Long Beach for the next nine years, she alternated 7th Fleet tours, ASW-HUK and carrier exercises and Taiwan Strait patrols, with training operations, including sonar and gunnery school ship assignments, off the west coast. In August 1964, however, her 7th Fleet deployment was extended and, for the third time, she joined in combat operations in the western Pacific.

On 30 August 1964 she joined TF 77 in the Tonkin Gulf and until 31 October operated in the South China Sea in support of South Vietnamese and American operations against North Vietnamese and Viet Cong forces.

Homeported at San Diego on her return, Prichett's tours in the West Pacific since that time were lengthened; most of her deployed time was spent off Vietnam. In the combat zone, she served as plane guard for carriers in the South China Sea and provided support fire for R.V.N., U.S., and R.O.K. forces operating along the 1000-mile coastline from the Gulf of Siam to the north of Huế. Illustrative of such support were her actions, 20 February–10 March 1968, off Phan Thiết. There her guns silenced an enemy mortar battery, damaged the enemy's command post, and delivered accurate call fire to break up enemy emplacements, and personnel and supply concentrations to contribute to the enemy's withdrawal. Prichett made the final westpac cruise 5 June 1969 through 18 November 1969 serving on the gunline in Vietnam for "call to fire" support for 17 days, subsequently returning to the Tonkin Gulf for plane guard duty with the USS Hancock until returning to San Diego to be decommissioned and was struck from the Navy List 10 January 1970.

== Geniere (D 555) ==
Prichett was transferred to Italy on 17 January 1970, and renamed Geniere (D 555). She was stricken and scrapped in 1975.

== Honors ==
Prichett earned eight battle stars during World War II, two during the Korean War, and six during the Vietnam War.
