= Oscar Walter Farenholt =

United States Navy admiral

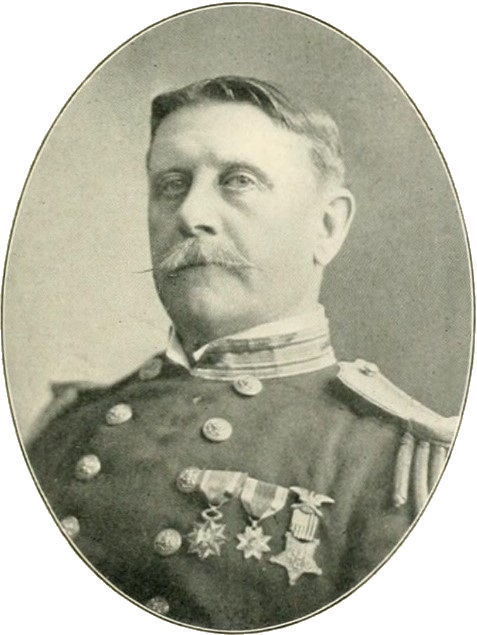
- Oscar Walter Farenholt
- Born: May 2, 1845; San Antonio, Texas
- Died: June 30, 1920 (aged 75); Mare Island, California
- Burial place: San Francisco National Cemetery, San Francisco, California
- Spouse: Ella Mortimer Ames (1848–1925)
- Military career
- Allegiance: United States of America
- Branch: United States Navy
- Service years: 1861–1901
- Rank: Rear Admiral
- Units: USS Wabash; USS Catskill
- Commands: USS Henry Janes; USS Pinta; USS Monocacy; USS Monadnock
- Conflicts: American Civil War; Spanish–American War

Rear Admiral Oscar Walter Farenholt (May 2, 1845 – June 30, 1920) was an officer in the United States Navy during the American Civil War, the Spanish–American War and is the first enlisted man in the Navy to reach flag rank.

== Early life ==
Farenholt was born to German immigrants in San Antonio, Texas, who had settled on a ranch on the Salado River 1842, not far from the famous Alamo Mission. Speaking only German until the age of eight, he was sent to New Orleans to a French school where he learned English for the first time. He continued his schooling until twelve years of age, entering a preparatory school, near Baton Rouge, Louisiana. Farenholt eventually broke off his studies believing dismissal from this institution to be in short order due to a boyish scrape, traveled to New Orleans, and shipped out to New York City aboard the American sailing ship Saint Charles. He continued sailing as a merchant sailor until the outbreak of the American Civil War.

== American Civil War ==
Farenholt entered the Navy as a seaman April 24, 1861, after 3 years in the merchant service. He participated in engagements and battles at Battle of Hatteras Inlet Batteries, Battle of Port Royal, Battle of Fort Pulaski, and numerous others. On October 22, 1862 while serving as a member of the howitzer gun crew aboard USS Wabash, ordinary seaman Farenholt was severely wounded at the Battle of Pocotaligo, South Carolina and was discharged from the Navy. He reentered the U.S. Navy in February, 1863 after recovering and was assigned to the monitor USS Catskill participating in almost daily engagements with defenses of Charleston, South Carolina from April 1863 to April 1864. He participated in the unsuccessful storming party of Fort Sumter in September, 1863. Distinguished service led to his appointment as Acting ensign on August 19, 1864, and he was in command of the mortar schooner USS Henry Janes attached to the squadron in the Sounds of North Carolina later that year. He also participated in the recapture of Plymouth, North Carolina, and several engagements on the Roanoke, Chowan, and Blackwater rivers as well as the capture of Fort Fisher, North Carolina.

== Post Civil War ==
Farenholt was assigned various duties and was promoted to ensign on March 12, 1868, master on December 18, 1868, lieutenant on March 21, 1870, lieutenant commander on May 11, 1882, and commander on June 19, 1892. In 1890 he was on sea duty attached to USS Pinta which was in port in Sitka Borough, Alaska.

== Spanish–American War ==
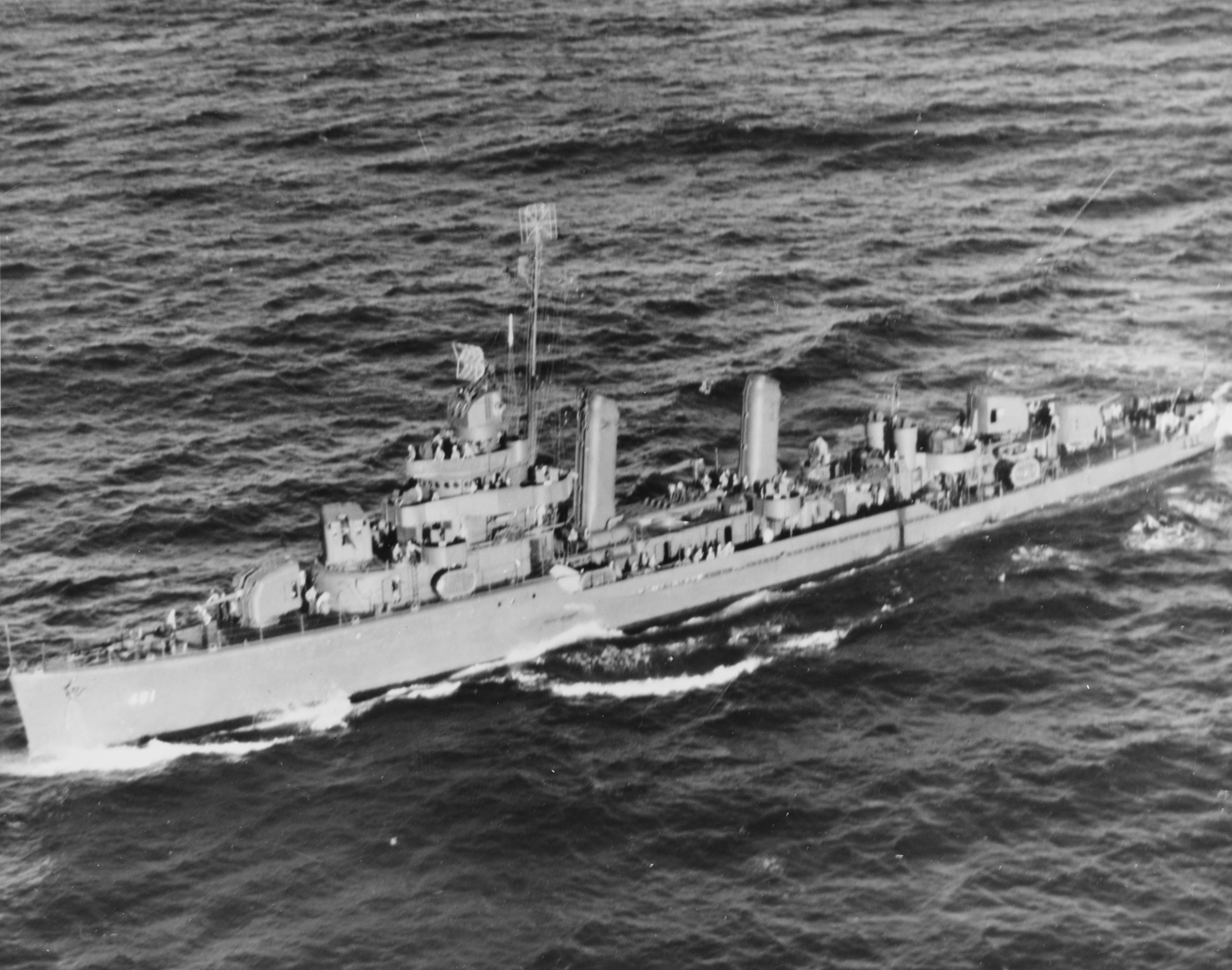
USS Farenholt (DD-491), commissioned in 1942

During the Spanish–American War, Farenholt was put in command of USS Monocacy. The ship was an old vessel with about 50 crew members. Monocacy was once said to be "only fit for a museum shelf." His ship was used as base of procurement at Shanghai for Dewey's fleet. Farenholt spent no time in the Caribbean during the war, even though that was where the majority of the fighting took place. He was given the task of obtaining a source for coal and supplies for the Asiatic Squadron through a Chinese intermediary. The efforts were kept secret, because this was against the neutrality laws.

== Post Spanish–American War ==
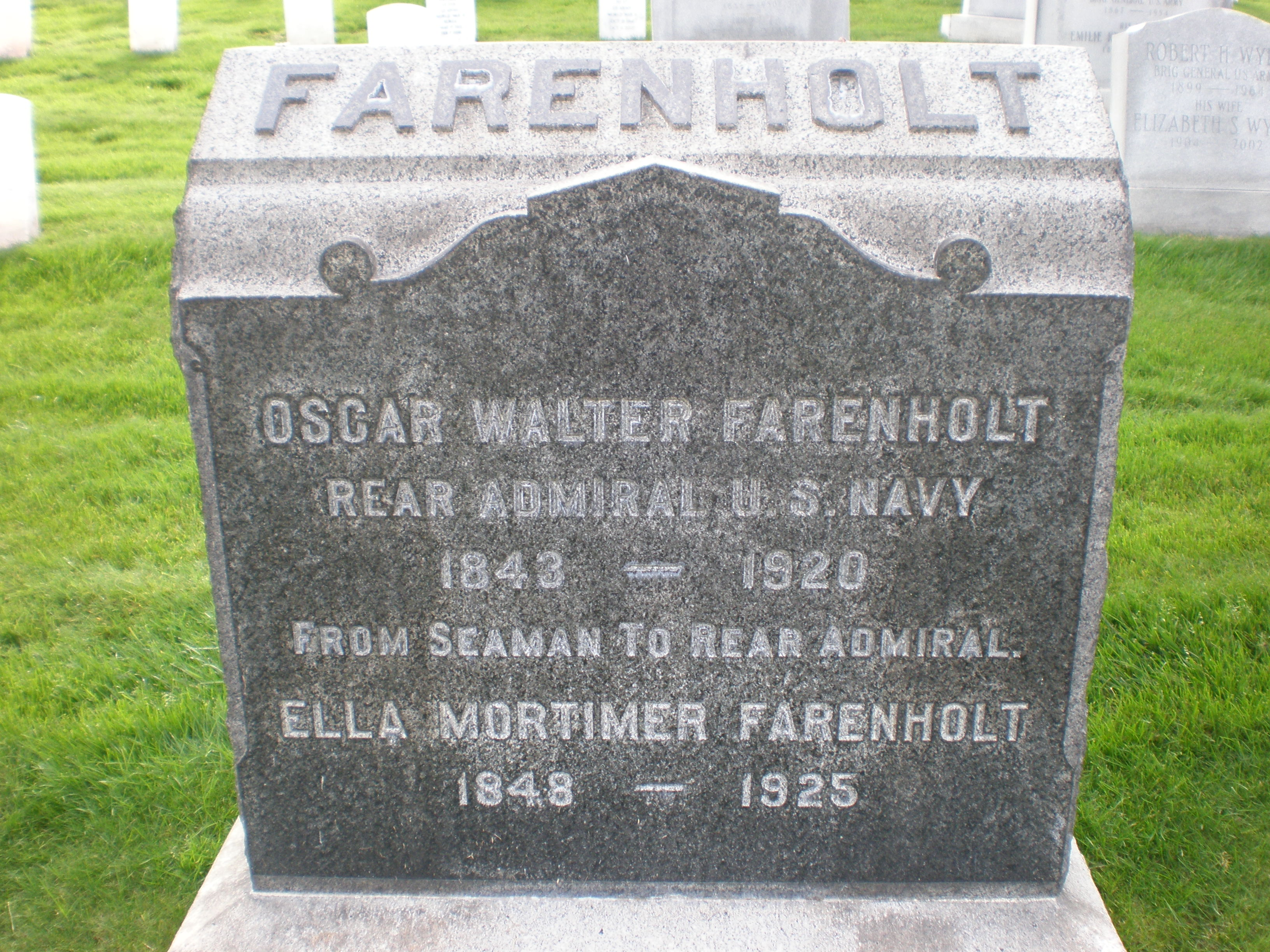
Farenholt's headstone at San Francisco National Cemetery.

He served at the Boston Navy Yard and at the Naval War College in February, 1899. He was promoted captain in September, 1900, served as Commandant of the Navy Yard at Cavite in the Philippine Islands in 1901, was Commander of the monitor USS Monadnock in the Asiatic station during 1901, and was promoted rear admiral on September 1, 1901. He was the first enlisted man in the Navy to reach flag rank, and voluntarily retired after giving 40 years of active service.

Farenholt married Miss Ella Mortimer Ames (born 1848 in Massachusetts) in 1870. Their son Ammen Farenholt (born 1871 in Norfolk, Virginia) earned his medical degree from Harvard in 1893, became a U.S. Navy medical officer and retired as a rear admiral. Oscar Farenholt retired September 1, 1901, and died from heart disease on June 30, 1920, at the Mare Island Naval Hospital in Vallejo, California, which was under the command of his son at the time. Ella died March 21, 1925, in California and both are buried at the San Francisco National Cemetery in San Francisco, California. Two ships have been named for Farenholt, USS Farenholt (DD-332) and USS Farenholt (DD-491).
