= USS Farenholt (DD-332) =

Clemson-class destroyer

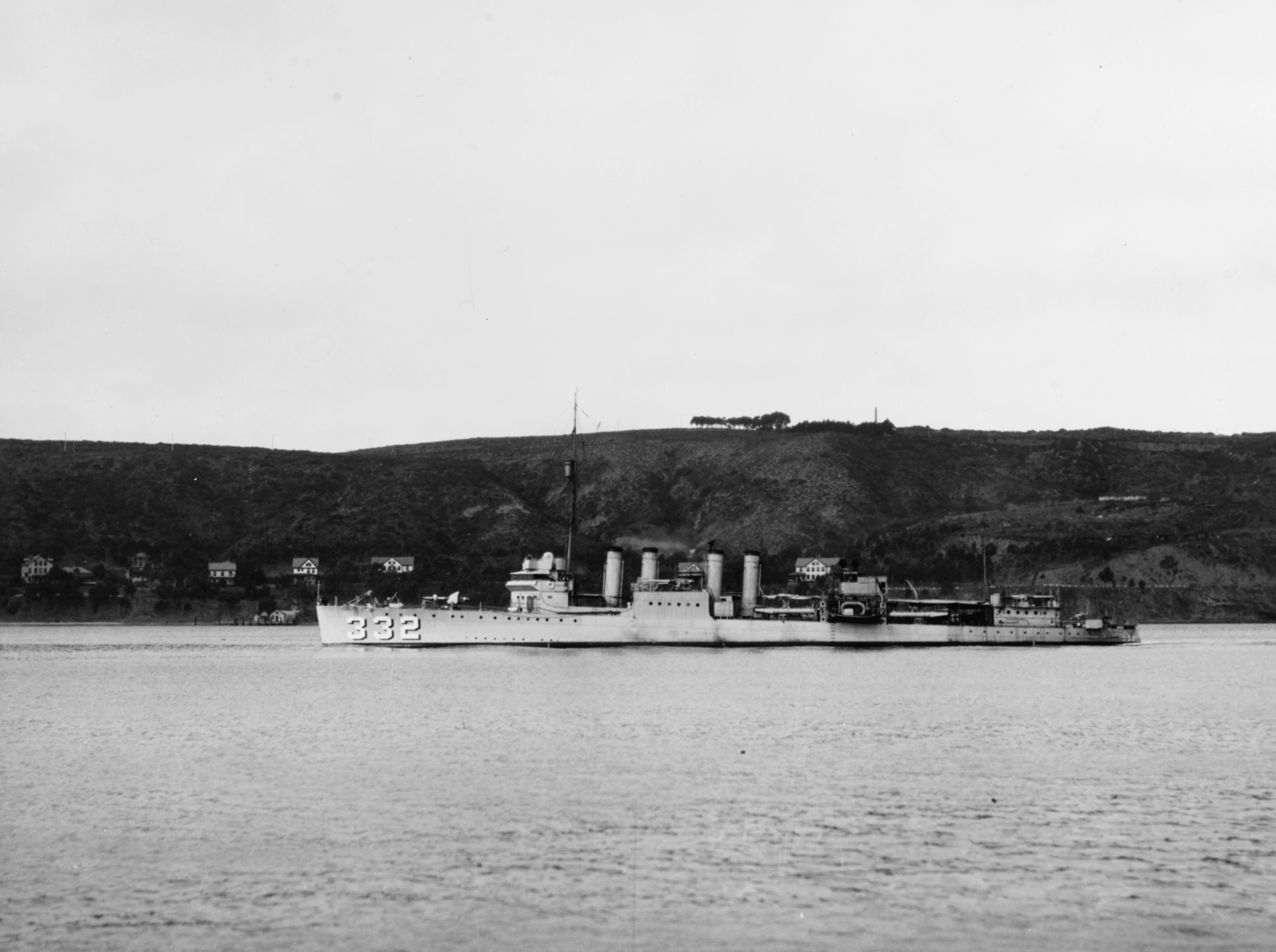

History

United States
- Namesake: Oscar Farenholt
- Builder: Bethlehem Shipbuilding Corporation, Union Iron Works, San Francisco
- Laid down: 13 September 1920
- Launched: 9 March 1921
- Sponsored by: Mrs. Richard H. Fairweather
- Commissioned: 10 May 1921
- Decommissioned: 20 February 1930
- Stricken: 12 July 1930
- Fate: Sold for scrap, 10 June 1931

General characteristics
- Class & type: Clemson-class destroyer
- Displacement: 1,190 tons
- Length: 314 feet 5 inches (95.83 m)
- Beam: 31 feet 8 inches (9.65 m)
- Draft: 9 feet 4 inches (2.84 m)
- Propulsion: 26,500 shp (20 MW); geared turbines, 2 screws
- Speed: 35 knots (65 km/h)
- Range: 4,900 nmi (9,100 km); @ 15 kt
- Complement: 122 officers and enlisted
- Armament: 4 × 4 in (102 mm)/50 guns, 12 × 21 inch (533 mm) torpedo tubes

The first USS Farenholt (DD-332) was a Clemson-class destroyer in the United States Navy following World War I. She was named for Oscar Farenholt.

== History ==
Farenholt was laid down on 13 September 1920 by Bethlehem Shipbuilding Corporation, Union Iron Works, San Francisco, California. She was launched on 9 March 1921, sponsored by Mrs. Richard H. Fairweather, and commissioned on 10 May 1921.

Farenholt first arrived at San Diego, California, her home port, 28 May 1921, and joined the Pacific Fleet in its yearly schedule of exercises and maneuvers along the west coast from the Pacific Northwest to the Panama Canal Zone. Gunnery drills, proving torpedoes, acting as plane guard for seaplane-carrying battleships and cruisers, fleet problems, and practice war maneuvers with the Army kept Farenholt almost constantly at sea.

In 1924 and 1927, Farenholt passed through the Panama Canal for fleet concentrations in the Caribbean, and during the second cruise, sailed north to visit Norfolk, Virginia, and Newport before returning to San Diego. Between May and August 1925, the destroyer sailed to the Hawaiian Islands for a fleet problem and joint exercises, then sailed on with the Battle Fleet to visit Pago Pago, Samoa, and ports in Australia and New Zealand, returning to the west coast by way of Honolulu. Again in 1928 she sailed to Pearl Harbor for large scale exercises in Hawaiian waters.

During the summer of 1929, in her last year of service, Farenholt cruised along the west coast with Naval Reserve members embarked for training, visiting Victoria, British Columbia, as well as United States ports.

== Fate ==
She was decommissioned 20 February 1930 and stricken from the Navy List on 12 July 1930. After partial scrapping, she was sold as a hulk on 10 June 1931 in accordance with the terms of the London Naval Treaty.
