= USS Wesson =

Cannon-class destroyer escort

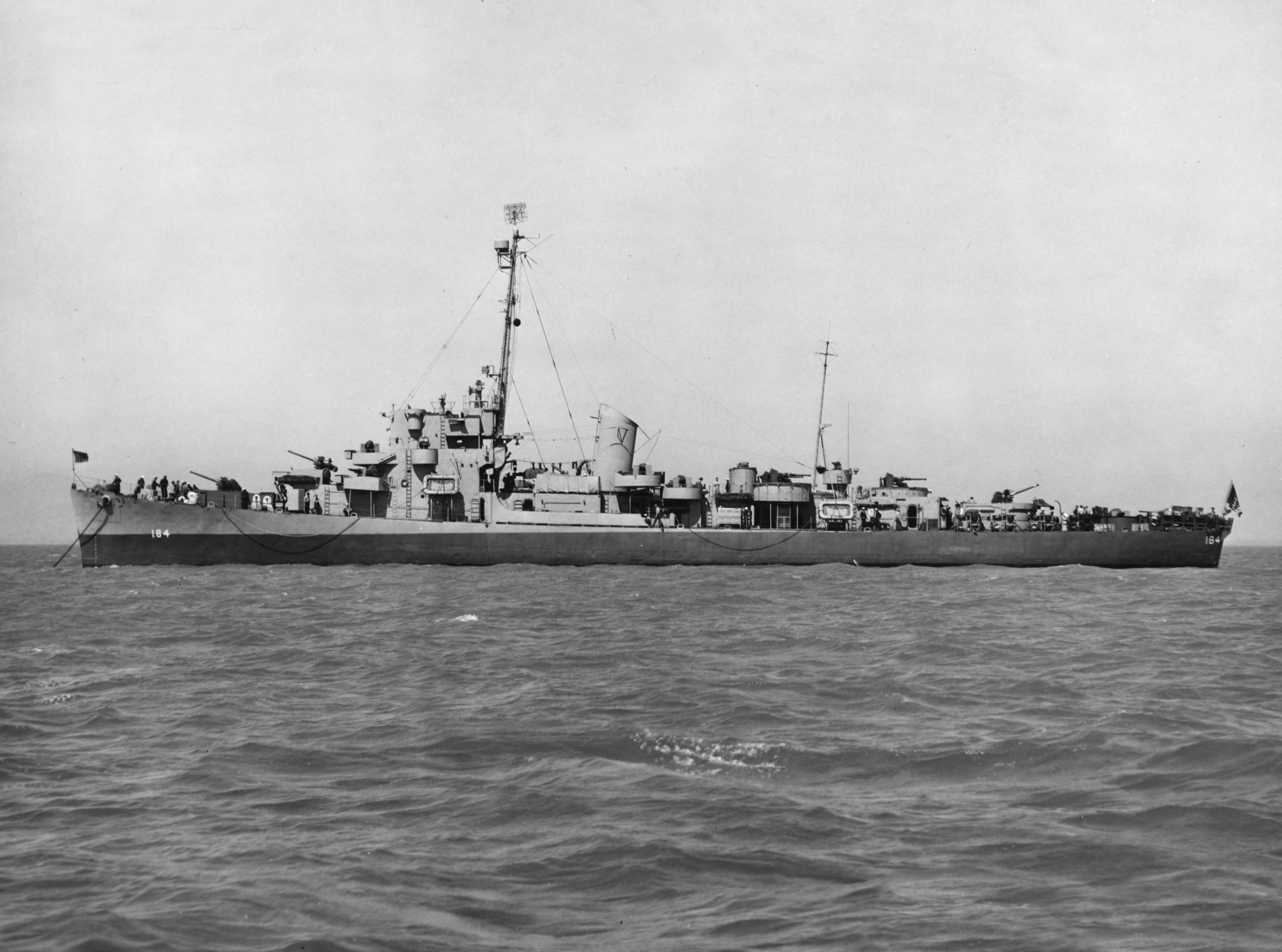

History

United States
- Name: USS Wesson
- Builder: Federal Shipbuilding and Drydock Company, Newark, New Jersey
- Laid down: 29 July 1943
- Launched: 17 October 1943
- Commissioned: 11 November 1943
- Decommissioned: 25 July 1946
- Stricken: 26 March 1951
- Honors and awards: 7 battle stars (World War II)
- Fate: Transferred to Italy, 10 January 1951

History

Italy
- Name: Andromeda (F 592)
- Acquired: 10 January 1951
- Stricken: January 1972
- Fate: Scrapped

General characteristics
- Class & type: Cannon-class destroyer escort
- Displacement: 1,240 long tons (1,260 t) standard; 1,620 long tons (1,646 t) full
- Length: 306 ft (93 m) o/a; 300 ft (91 m) w/l
- Beam: 36 ft 10 in (11.23 m)
- Draft: 11 ft 8 in (3.56 m)
- Propulsion: 4 × GM Mod. 16-278A diesel engines with electric drive, 6,000 shp (4,474 kW), 2 screws
- Speed: 21 knots (39 km/h; 24 mph)
- Range: 10,800 nmi (20,000 km) at 12 kn (22 km/h; 14 mph)
- Complement: 15 officers and 201 enlisted
- Armament: 3 × single Mk.22 3"/50 caliber guns; 1 × twin 40 mm Mk.1 AA gun; 8 × 20 mm Mk.4 AA guns; 3 × 21-inch (533 mm) torpedo tubes; 1 × Hedgehog Mk.10 anti-submarine mortar (144 rounds); 8 × Mk.6 depth charge projectors; 2 × Mk.9 depth charge tracks

USS Wesson (DE-184) was a Cannon-class destroyer escort built for the United States Navy during World War II. She served in the Pacific Ocean and provided escort service against submarine and air attack for Navy vessels and convoys. She returned home at war's end with a very respectable seven battle stars to her credit.

She was laid down on 29 July 1943 at Newark, New Jersey, by the Federal Shipbuilding and Drydock Co.; launched on 17 October 1943; sponsored by Mrs. Eleanor Wesson; and commissioned on 11 November 1943.

== World War II Pacific Theatre operations ==
Wesson departed New York on 28 November for shakedown off Bermuda. She returned to New York on 28 December 1943 for post-shakedown availability which lasted until 9 January 1944 when she sailed for the Panama Canal Zone. After transiting the Panama Canal, Wesson departed Balboa on the 19th, bound for Hawaii in company with Riddle (DE-185), and arrived at Pearl Harbor on 1 February. Following minor repairs and training exercises, the destroyer escort joined the screen of a westward-bound convoy. On 18 February, the convoy split; and Wesson headed for Kwajalein Atoll in the Marshall Islands.

=== Captures Japanese cutter ===
She arrived at Roi Namur the following day and began patrolling the entrance to the harbor. On 22 February, Wesson sighted and fired upon a Japanese cutter, killing six of the enemy and bringing five prisoners on board. She later turned them over to the island commander at Roi.

The destroyer escort set course for Majuro, also in the Marshalls, on 4 March 1944 and, in company with Steele (DE-8), sailed for Oahu three days later, screening Cambria (APA-36). Wesson arrived at Pearl Harbor on 13 March and spent a week there undergoing minor repairs and receiving fuel, stores, and provisions. On 20 March, she got underway to escort SS Meteor to the Gilbert Islands and arrived at Tarawa on the 31st. After a one-day stop, Wesson again set her course for Hawaii as an escort for Pecos (AO-65). She arrived at Pearl Harbor on 10 April and conducted torpedo and anti-submarine exercises until 29 April when she received orders sending her to Majuro as an escort for Preble (DM-20).

=== Heavy convoy schedule ===
Wesson returned to Hawaii on 13 May and received repairs and conducted anti-submarine exercises before getting underway on 27 May to escort a convoy to Majuro. Having moored at Majuro harbor on 3 June, Wesson departed three days later for a rendezvous with Task Group (TG) 58.1 to conduct fueling operations. On 12 June, she made rendezvous with Copahee (CVE-12) and Evans (DD-552) ; and, two days later, the destroyer escort took position in the screen while fueling operations were in progress. She continued to support fueling operations until 16 June when she set her course for Eniwetok Atoll in the Marshall Islands. After a brief stop there, the ship received orders to make a round-trip voyage to the Marianas and back, escorting three oilers. She returned to Eniwetok on 11 July and, five days later, put to sea to support several fuelings and mail transfers. On 31 July, Wesson arrived off Saipan Island screening Patuxent (AO-44).

=== Drydocked at Eniwetok ===
On 1 August 1944, Wesson steamed for the Marshalls and arrived at Eniwetok on 5 August for upkeep and availability. From 29 to 30 August, the ship was drydocked to repaint her underwater hull. On 2 September, Wesson got underway to rendezvous with Sitkoh Bay (CVE-86) and Barnes (CVE-20) and proceed in company with the escort carriers to Manus in the Admiralty Islands. The force arrived at Seeadler Harbor, Manus, on 10 September and, four days later, sortied for a rendezvous off the Palau Islands in the Western Carolines. During flight operations, Wesson rescued three airmen who had crashed upon launching. The destroyer escort screened Sitkoh Bay as the escort carrier headed back to the Admiralty Islands for repairs to her catapult. On 22 September, she and Mitchell (DE-43) left Seeadler Harbor, Manus Island, escorting Guadalupe (AO-32) to a fueling area in the Palau Islands; but, on 29 September, Wesson received orders to return to Manus.

The first three days of October found Wesson anchored in Seeadler Harbor. On the 4th, she got underway as part of a task unit centered around Nehenta Bay (CVE-74), Steamer Bay (CVE-87), Sitkoh Bay (CVE-86), and Nassau (CVE-16). During fueling operations in the Philippine Sea, Wesson assumed plane guard duty. On 22 October – two days after American forces returned to the Philippine Islands with landings on Leyte – Wesson got underway to escort Sitkoh Bay to Manus, and they arrived back in Seeadler Harbor on 26 October. Wesson remained there undergoing availability for the remainder of the month.

On 1 November 1944, the ship left the Admiralties to escort Armadillo (IX-111) to Ulithi Atoll, where she arrived on 5 November. After conducting firing practice and fueling exercises, Wesson departed Ulithi on the 16th with a group of oilers to rendezvous with the Fast Carrier Task Force (TF) 38 for fueling in the western Philippine Sea. Following the successful conclusion of that operation, the destroyer escort returned to Ulithi on 29 November. On 10 December, Wesson, as part of a supply group, again made rendezvous with TF 38 for fueling and aircraft replacement. On 20 December, the destroyer escort received orders to escort Kwajalein (CVE-98) to Guam and, after completing that task, returned to Ulithi and spent the remainder of 1944 in drydock for repairs to her sonar gear.

=== Supporting Philippine Islands operations ===
During the first week of January 1945, Wesson underwent repairs and inspections. On the 7th, the ship got underway, with a task unit consisting of five oilers and three escorts, for a rendezvous east of the Philippines. On the 13th, Wesson proceeded to Leyte Gulf to procure charts and instructions. The next day, she received orders to escort Housatonic (AO-35) to Lingayen Gulf off Luzon. On 15 January, having been detached from the oiler, Wesson returned to San Pedro Bay, Leyte. On the 19th, she got underway to escort Housatonic to Ulithi. After screening the oiler's entrance into Mugai Channel on 26 January, the destroyer proceeded independently to Ulithi Atoll and remained there into February.

=== Supporting Iwo Jima invasion ===
On the 5th, Wesson – as part of Escort Division 44 – set her course for the Marianas and made stops at Apra Harbor, Guam; Saipan; and Tanapag. The ship then departed the Marianas for duty supporting the invasion of Iwo Jima. On 16 February, the carriers began air strikes against the island. The destroyer escort served in the screen protecting the carriers for 10 days.

=== Supporting Okinawa invasion ===
From Iwo Jima, Wesson returned to Ulithi Atoll, where she was assigned to Task Force 54 (TF 54) for the invasion of Okinawa. She arrived off Kerama Retto on 25 March and took station in a circular screen. The next day, Wesson and Barton (DD-599) helped to protect Tennessee (BB-43), Nevada (BB-36), Birmingham (CL-62), St. Louis (CL-49), and Wichita (CA-45) while they shelled southern Okinawa.

On 26 March, Wichita sighted a torpedo wake and a periscope. After Wesson maneuvered and dropped a 13 depth charge pattern, an anti-submarine patrol plane observed an oil slick. However, no other evidence appeared to confirm that an enemy submarine had been destroyed or damaged. The next day, the formation came under attack by Japanese planes. Wesson fired at three of the raiders; and one plane took several hits in the fuselage just above the wing before bursting into flame and crashing astern of the screen. Enemy air attacks continued for the next two days. On 30 March, Wesson proceeded on orders west of Zampa Misaki and destroyed four mines by gunfire en route. She then reported mines in an unswept area north and east of Zampa Misaki. Her formation came under air attack every day until 5 April. The next day at 0307, the enemy struck with a sizeable formation of planes, and the action continued incessantly until dawn. From 1400 to 1800, there were so many enemy planes darting in and put of clouds that the ship maneuvered continuously in tight turns of up to 180 degrees. Scattered clouds provided the enemy planes with extremely effective cover. All enemy planes were considered to be suiciders. One plane attacked Wesson but was turned back by repeated fire. It then attempted to crash into a destroyer on the port side but missed and splashed into the water.

As the Japanese air arm had been decimated by this point in the war, the lack of trained and experienced pilots led to its most extensive deployment of kamikaze attacks during this battle. On 7 April, Wesson relieved Sterett (DD-407) north of Ie Shima and the Motobu Peninsula and took station screening LCI(L)-U52 and LCI(L)-558. At 0340, the destroyer escort fought off a small enemy air attack which lasted until dawn. At 0917, Wesson opened fire on three enemy planes crossing her bow and then engaged a kamikaze diving from the clouds to starboard. The plane crashed into the destroyer escort's torpedo tubes amidships. Five men died instantly, one was missing, and 25 were wounded, two of whom died later. Wesson lost and regained power several times and suffered a fire on the boat deck, as well as flooding in the engineering spaces. All power was lost aft, propulsion was lost on the port shaft, and the rudder jammed full right. Lang (DD-399) came alongside and transferred a submersible pump and gasoline, then took Wesson under tow. The tow line parted at 1133, and Wesson steamed into Kerama Retto under her own power with Lang screening.

=== Emergency repairs Stateside ===
Despite enemy air attacks, the destroyer escort completed emergency repairs on 10 April. The next day, she got underway en route for the Marianas and arrived at Saipan on 17 April. A week later, Wesson sailed for San Francisco, California, where – from 17 May to 25 June – she received an overhaul while her battle damage was being repaired. On 3 July, the ship set course for San Diego, California, and 10 days of refresher training before returning to Pearl Harbor on 21 July.

=== Return to convoy duty ===
After conducting various exercises in Hawaiian waters through 14 August, the destroyer escort received orders to proceed, via Eniwetok, to the Philippines. She arrived at Eniwetok on 22 August; then escorted three attack transports to Ulithi and entered the lagoon of that atoll through Mugai Channel on the 28th. That same day, she pressed on for Leyte, escorting a convoy of eight ships. On 1 September, the convoy was dissolved; and Wesson proceeded independently into Leyte Gulf. Four days later, Wesson departed San Pedro Bay, Leyte, bound for Okinawa and entered Buckner Bay on 8 September. On 16 September, Wesson and Foreman (DE-633) sailed to waters west of Okinawa to avoid a typhoon and returned to Buckner Bay the following day. On 20 September, Wesson set course for Japan and arrived at Wakayama, Honshū, two days later.

On 24 September 1945, the ship – with Alvin C. Cockrell (DE-366) and Cecil J. Doyle (DE-368) – got underway to screen a unit of TF-51 built around Makin Island (CVE-93) and Santee (CVE-29). Wesson took station in the screen operating in Kii Suido. After supporting two days of flight operations and exploding several mines, the destroyer escort returned to Wakanoura Wan after the task unit had been dissolved.

=== End-of-War activity ===
October 1945 began with Wesson and McGinty (DE-365) escorting California (BB-44), Tennessee (BB-43), Makin Island (CVE-93), and Lunga Point (CVE-94) to Tokyo Bay. On 7 October, the ship left Tokyo Bay and stopped at Kii Suido, Bungo Suido, and Okino Shima before arriving at Yokosuka, Japan, on 26 October. She returned to Wakanoura Wan before setting her course for Okinawa on 31 October. On 3 November, Wesson got underway for Naha Ho, then proceeded to escort two merchant ships and an Army transport to Jinsen, Korea. She returned to Buckner Bay, Okinawa, on 10 November, embarked passengers for Guam and Pearl Harbor, then sailed the next day, escorting the former Stewart (DD-224). Wesson took Stewart in tow due to an engineering casualty and arrived at Apra Harbor, Guam, on 17 November. Three days later, Wesson headed for Hawaii and arrived at Pearl Harbor on 28 November. There, she took on board passengers, pushed on, and arrived at San Diego, California, on 6 December. Wesson transited the Panama Canal and reached Charleston, South Carolina, on 23 December where she spent the remaining days of 1945.

== Andromeda (F 592) ==
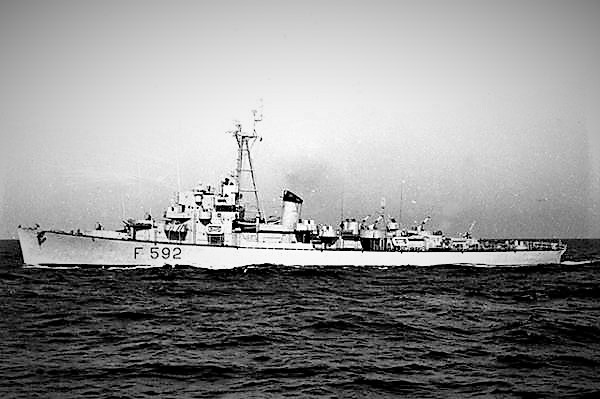
The frigate Andromeda (F 592) in Taranto

Wesson shifted to the inactive fleet berthing area at Green Cove Springs, Florida, to prepare for eventual inactivation. She was decommissioned there on 24 June 1946 and placed in reserve. Wesson was transferred to Italy on 10 January 1951 as Andromeda (F 592) and struck from the Navy List on 26 March 1951. In January 1972, she was struck from the Italian Naval Register and scrapped.

== Awards ==
Wesson earned seven battle stars for her World War II service.
