= USS Farenholt (DD-491) =

Benson-class destroyer

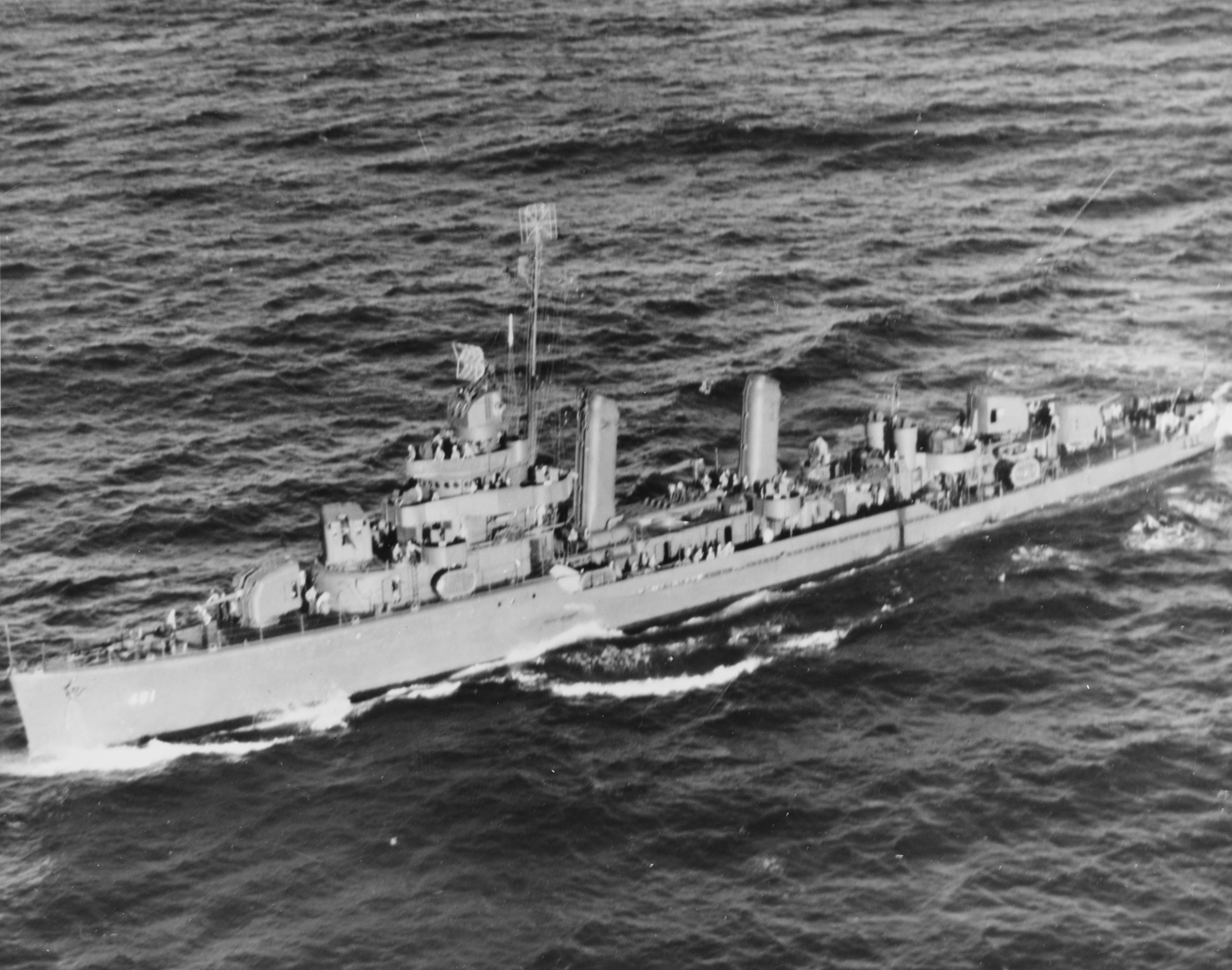
- Farenholt

History

United States
- Name: Farenholt
- Namesake: Oscar Farenholt
- Builder: Bethlehem Mariners Harbor, Staten Island
- Launched: 19 November 1941
- Commissioned: 2 April 1942
- Decommissioned: 26 April 1946
- Stricken: June 1971
- Identification: Hull number: DD-491
- Fate: Sold for scrap, November 1972

General characteristics
- Class & type: Benson-class destroyer
- Displacement: 1,620 long tons (1,650 t) (standard)
- Length: 348 ft 4 in (106.2 m)
- Beam: 36 ft 1 in (11 m)
- Draft: 11 ft 10 in (3.6 m)
- Speed: 38 knots (70 km/h; 44 mph)
- Complement: 208
- Armament: 4 × single 5 in (127 mm) guns; 1 × quintuple 21 in (533 mm) torpedo tubes; 6 × depth charge throwers, 2 × depth charge racks

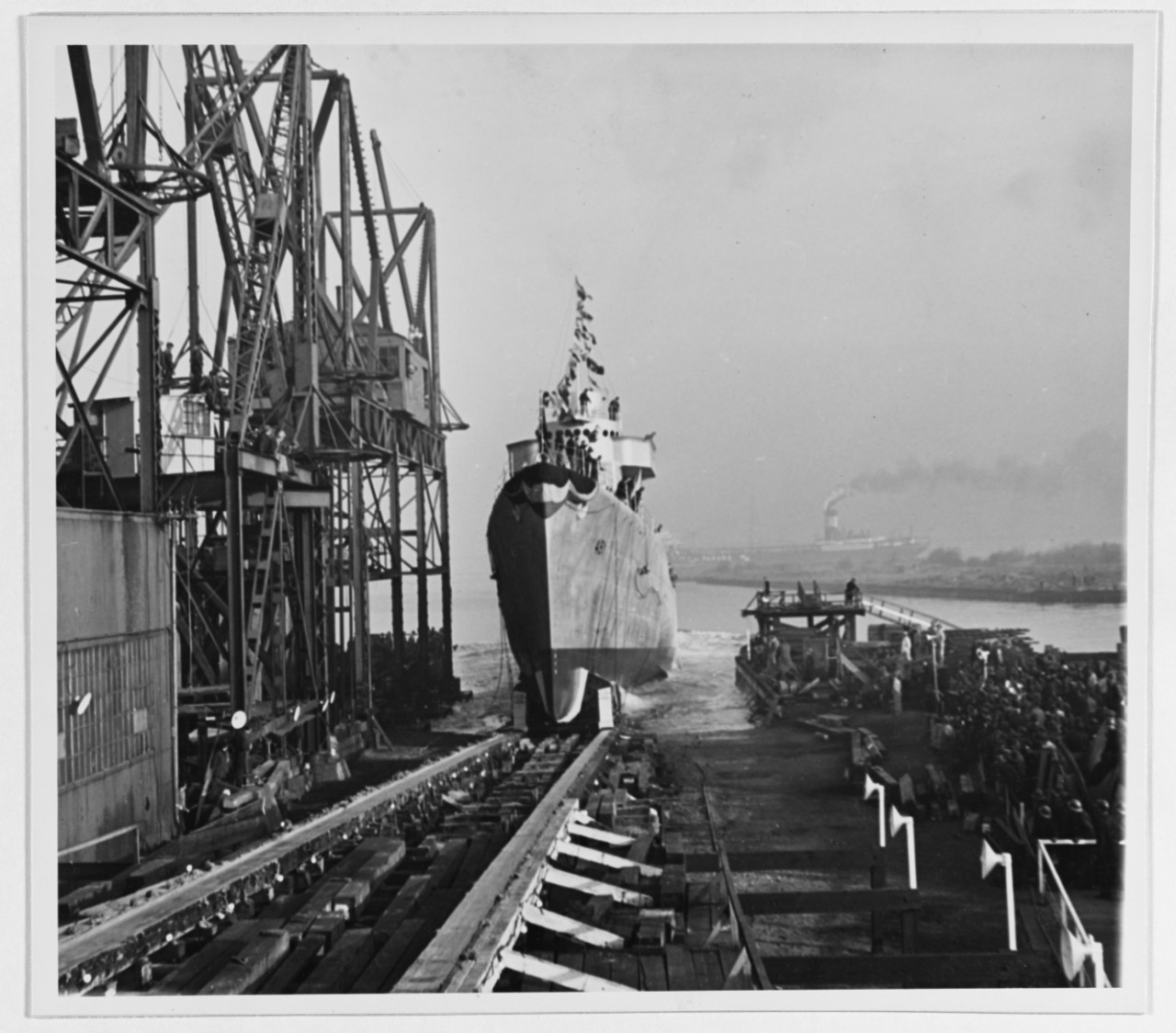
Farenholt slides down the building ways at Bethlehem Staten Island during her launching on 19 November 1941

USS Farenholt (DD-491) was a Benson-class destroyer in the United States Navy during World War II. She was the second ship named for Admiral Oscar Farenholt.

Farenholt was launched 19 November 1941 by Bethlehem Steel Company, Staten Island, New York; sponsored by Miss N. L. Garland, great-grandniece of Admiral Farenholt; and commissioned 2 April 1942.

== Service history ==
Farenholt sailed from San Diego, California, on 1 July 1942 for Tongatapu, Tonga Islands, where between 18 and 23 July, she joined in shore bombardment exercises. Sailing in the task force centered around Wasp, Farenholt took part in the invasion of Guadalcanal 7 August, the first American land offensive of the war. She screened Wasp as the aircraft carrier launched air strikes supporting the Marines in the initial days of this long and bitter struggle, and acted as flagship for Destroyer Squadron 12. After replenishing at Nouméa from 3 to 8 September, she returned to the Wasp group, covering the transportation of reinforcements from Espiritu Santo to Guadalcanal. When her force was attacked by two Japanese submarines 15 September, she rescued 143 survivors of torpedoed Wasp, including the task force commander and the commanding officer of the carrier.

Farenholt returned to Espiritu Santo with the survivors next day, then sailed to Nouméa to screen occupation troops to Funafuti. Back at Espiritu Santo on 6 October 1942, she joined a force whose mission was to intercept and destroy Japanese shipping and to prevent the reinforcement of Guadalcanal by the nightly Tokyo Express runs into the island. On the night of 11/12 October, her force contacted the Japanese in the Battle of Cape Esperance, sinking a Japanese destroyer. Three American ships, one of which later sank, were damaged in the action. One of these was Farenholt, which received three hits, including two from American light cruisers, and suffered 3 killed and 43 wounded. Although her torpedo tubes were inoperative, she continued to fire on the Japanese ships until the close of the action, scoring hits on a cruiser and a destroyer. Flooding through shell holes on her waterline, Farenholt was saved when oil, water, and topside weights were shifted to list the ship 9° to starboard, bringing the holes out of the water; she made Espiritu Santo 13 October under her own power.

Farenholt sailed to repair battle damage at Pearl Harbor, and returned to Espiritu Santo 3 March 1943. After a month of patrol duty and training exercises in the New Hebrides, she sailed 3 April for escort operations in the Solomon Islands. Off Lunga Point on the night of 6 April, she engaged enemy bombers, and the next day, escorting six ships eastward through Sealark Channel, was under attack by 14 torpedo bombers, at least one of which she shot down. One of her men was wounded by a near miss. Once more she replenished at Espiritu Santo, and then joined in training operations, resuming escort missions to and from the Solomons 30 April. On 13 May she drove off a bomber attack which wounded one of her men, and on 30 June engaged shore batteries on the coast of New Georgia at Munda to protect transports landing troops on the island of Rendova across the channel. As the assault shipping retired from Rendova late that day, guarded by Farenholt and six other destroyers, a flight of Japanese torpedo planes attacked. Farenholt joined in the general barrage which splashed many of the attackers, maneuvered to avoid two torpedoes, and was struck by a third which failed to explode. When McCawley was sunk, Farenholt took aboard the task force commander, Rear Admiral Richmond K. Turner.

As the New Georgia operation continued, with new landings at various points on the large island, Farenholt escorted support shipping north from the lower Solomons and fired shore bombardment until 16 July 1943. After a brief period alongside a tender at Espiritu Santo, she operated out of that port and Efate on escort and patrol duty between Nouméa and Guadalcanal, sweeping against Japanese shipping, and bringing troops and supplies to Vella Lavella. In October, she sailed for a 6-day visit at Sydney, Australia, returning to Purvis Bay 29 October, and 2 days later joining the screen of the carrier striking force operating northeast of Bougainville in the initial landings. Along with their direct support of the assault and the ensuing battle, the carriers launched air strikes on Buka and Rabaul. From November through February 1944, Farenholt continued her operations in support of the Bougainville and New Britain operations, escorting reinforcements and supplies to Empress Augusta Bay, searching for enemy shipping, and bombarding Choisoul, many points on Bougainville, and the Shortland Islands. She covered landings on Green Island 14 February, fighting off a dive bomber attack in which she downed at least one plane. On the night of 17/18 February, her squadron made a daring dash down St. George Channel to fire on shipping in Blanche Bay and bombard Rabaul, sinking two merchantmen and inflicting much damage on shore installations. A similar attack on Kavieng on 25 February provoked heavy counterfire from shore, and Farenholt was holed at the waterline on her starboard side. Once again, her crew saved their ship, controlling flooding with skill and determination.

Temporary repairs were made at Purvis Bay, and Farenholt sailed for a much needed West Coast overhaul. She sailed for action once more on 16 June 1944, and after training briefly at Pearl Harbor, arrived off Guam on 21 July to screen the transports landing assault troops. She patrolled off Guam until 10 August, then sailed back to Eniwetok to prepare for the Palaus operation, major in itself, as well as being the most important preliminary to the liberation of the Philippines. Through September, she screened carriers for preliminary strikes on the Palaus and the southern Philippines, bombarded a radar station on Cape San Augustine, Mindanao, supported the unopposed landings on Morotai and the bitterly contested assault of Angaur, and sailed with the carriers as they launched raids on Manila and photographic reconnaissance flights over Leyte and Samar.

Between 28 September 1944 and 13 October, she replenished at Manus, then met with the fleet carriers once more in time to screen during flights flown in support of the assault landings at Leyte 20 October. After fueling on the 21st, her group shaped course for Ulithi, to be called back on the 24th for its role in the decisive Battle for Leyte Gulf. Farenholt's squadron, however, was detached to meet with Canberra and Houston, damaged in the air battles off Taiwan earlier in the month and still making their retirement toward Ulithi. The group arrived at Ulithi 27 October.

With Commander, Destroyer Squadron 12 assigned to command the Western Carolines and Marianas Patrol and Escort Group, Farenholt served as station ship at Ulithi and Kossol Passage and escorted convoys between those points and to ocean rendezvous until 5 May 1945. Three days later she reached Okinawa, and for the next month, carried out the usual varied destroyer duties around the embattled island, screening and escorting shipping of all kinds, rescuing downed pilots and survivors of damaged and sunken ships, bombarding shore targets, and operating with carriers as they launched air strikes on Japanese positions and bases, especially those in the Sakishima Gunto from which kamikazes were flown. She sailed north to San Pedro Bay, arriving 19 June, to join the logistics group supporting the fast carriers in their air strikes against the Japanese home islands. On 28 July, Farenholt returned to Okinawa for screening duties until 22 September, when she sailed with an Army general aboard to accept the Japanese surrender of islands in the southern Ryukyus and in the Sakishima Gunto. From 20 to 31 October, she voyaged from Buckner Bay to Sasebo escorting a transport, then sailed for San Diego and Charleston, South Carolina, arriving 8 December. She was placed out of commission in reserve at Charleston 26 April 1946. After more than 25 years in the reserve fleet, Farenholt was stricken from the Naval Vessel Register in June 1971 and sold for scrapping in November 1972.

== Awards ==
Farenholt received 11 battle stars for World War II service.
