= USS Steamer Bay =

Casablanca-class escort carrier of the US Navy

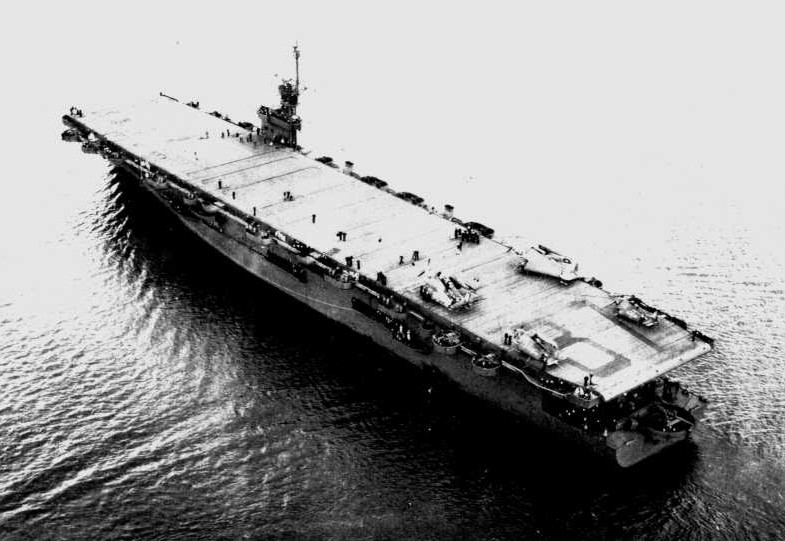
- USS Steamer Bay underway

History

United States
- Name: Steamer Bay
- Namesake: Steamer Bay, Etolin Island, Alaska
- Ordered: as a Type S4-S2-BB3 hull, MCE hull 1124
- Awarded: 18 June 1942
- Builder: Kaiser Shipyards
- Laid down: 4 December 1943
- Launched: 26 February 1944
- Commissioned: 4 April 1944
- Decommissioned: 4 February 1946
- Stricken: 1 March 1959
- Identification: Hull symbol: CVE-87
- Honors and awards: 6 Battle stars
- Fate: Sold for scrapping 29 August 1959

General characteristics
- Class & type: Casablanca-class escort carrier
- Displacement: 8,188 long tons (8,319 t) (standard); 10,902 long tons (11,077 t) (full load)
- Length: 512 ft 3 in (156.13 m) (oa); 490 ft (150 m) (wl); 474 ft (144 m) (fd)
- Beam: 65 ft 2 in (19.86 m); 108 ft (33 m) (extreme width)
- Draft: 20 ft 9 in (6.32 m) (max)
- Installed power: 4 × Babcock & Wilcox boilers; 9,000 shp (6,700 kW)
- Propulsion: 2 × Skinner Unaflow reciprocating steam engines; 2 × screws
- Speed: 19 knots (35 km/h; 22 mph)
- Range: 10,240 nmi (18,960 km; 11,780 mi) at 15 kn (28 km/h; 17 mph)
- Complement: Total: 910 – 916 officers and men; Embarked Squadron: 50 – 56; Ship's Crew: 860
- Armament: As designed: 1 × 5 in (127 mm)/38 cal dual-purpose gun; 4 × twin 40 mm (1.57 in) Bofors anti-aircraft guns; 12 × 20 mm (0.79 in) Oerlikon anti-aircraft cannons; Varied, ultimate armament: 1 × 5 in (127 mm)/38 cal dual-purpose gun; 8 × twin 40 mm (1.57 in) Bofors anti-aircraft guns; 20 × 20 mm (0.79 in) Oerlikon anti-aircraft cannons
- Aircraft carried: 27
- Aviation facilities: 1 × catapult; 2 × elevators

Service record
- Part of: United States Pacific Fleet (1943–1946); Pacific Reserve Fleet (1947–1959)
- Operations: Invasion of Lingayen Gulf; Invasion of Iwo Jima; Battle of Okinawa; Operation Magic Carpet

USS Steamer Bay (CVE-87) was a Casablanca-class escort carrier of the United States Navy. She was named after Steamer Bay, located within Etolin Island, Alaska. Launched in February 1944, and commissioned in April, she served in support of the Invasion of Lingayen Gulf, the Invasion of Iwo Jima, and the Battle of Okinawa. Postwar, she participated in Operation Magic Carpet. She was decommissioned in January 1947, when she was mothballed in the Pacific Reserve Fleet. Ultimately, she was sold for scrapping in August 1959.

== Design and description ==
A side profile of the design of Thetis Bay.

Steamer Bay was a Casablanca-class escort carrier, the most numerous type of aircraft carriers ever built. Built to stem heavy losses during the Battle of the Atlantic, they came into service in late 1943, by which time the U-boat threat was already in retreat. Although some did see service in the Atlantic, the majority were utilized in the Pacific, ferrying aircraft, providing logistics support, and conducting close air support for the island-hopping campaigns. The Casablanca-class carriers were built on the standardized Type S4-S2-BB3 hull, a lengthened variant of the Doyen-class hull, and specifically designed to be mass-produced using welded prefabricated sections. This allowed them to be produced at unprecedented speeds: the final ship of her class, Munda, was delivered to the Navy just 101 days after the laying of her keel.

Steamer Bay was 512 ft 3 in (156.13 m) long overall (490 ft (150 m) at the waterline), had a beam of 65 ft 2 in (19.86 m), and a draft of 20 ft 9 in (6.32 m). She displaced 8,188 long tons (8,319 t) standard, which increased to 10,902 long tons (11,077 t) with a full load. To carry out flight operations, the ship had a 257 ft (78 m) hangar deck and a 474 ft (144 m) flight deck. Her compact size necessitated the installation of an aircraft catapult at her bow, and there were two aircraft elevators to facilitate movement of aircraft between the flight and hangar deck: one each fore and aft.

She was powered by four Babcock & Wilcox Express D boilers that raised 285 psi (1,970 kPa) of steam at 577 °F (303 °C). The steam generated by these boilers fed two Skinner Unaflow reciprocating steam engines, delivering 9,000 hp (6,700 kW) to two propeller shafts. This allowed her to reach speeds of 19 kn (35 km/h; 22 mph), with a cruising range of 10,240 nmi (18,960 km; 11,780 mi) at 15 kn (28 km/h; 17 mph). For armament, one 5 in (127 mm)/38 caliber dual-purpose gun was mounted on the stern. Additional anti-aircraft defense was provided by eight Bofors 40 mm (1.57 in) anti-aircraft guns in single mounts and twelve Oerlikon 20 mm (0.79 in) cannons mounted around the perimeter of the deck. By 1945, Casablanca-class carriers had been modified to carry twenty Oerlikon cannons and sixteen Bofors guns; the doubling of the latter was accomplished by putting them into twin mounts. Sensors onboard consisted of a SG surface-search radar and a SK air-search radar.

Although Casablanca-class escort carriers were intended to function with a crew of 860 and an embarked squadron of 50 to 56, the exigencies of wartime often necessitated the inflation of the crew count. They were designed to operate with 27 aircraft, but the hangar deck could accommodate much more during transport or training missions.

During the Invasion of Lingayen Gulf, the Invasion of Iwo Jima, and the Battle of Okinawa, she carried 16 FM-2 Wildcat fighters, and 12 TBM-3 Avenger torpedo bombers, for a total of 28 aircraft.

== Construction ==
The escort carrier was laid down on 4 December 1943, under a Maritime Commission contract, MC hull 1124, by Kaiser Shipbuilding Company, Vancouver, Washington. She was named Steamer Bay, as part of a tradition which named escort carriers after bays or sounds in Alaska. She was launched on 26 February 1944; sponsored by Mrs. Henry S. Kendall; transferred to the United States Navy and commissioned on 4 April 1944, Captain Myron Steadman Teller in command.

== Service history ==
=== World War II ===
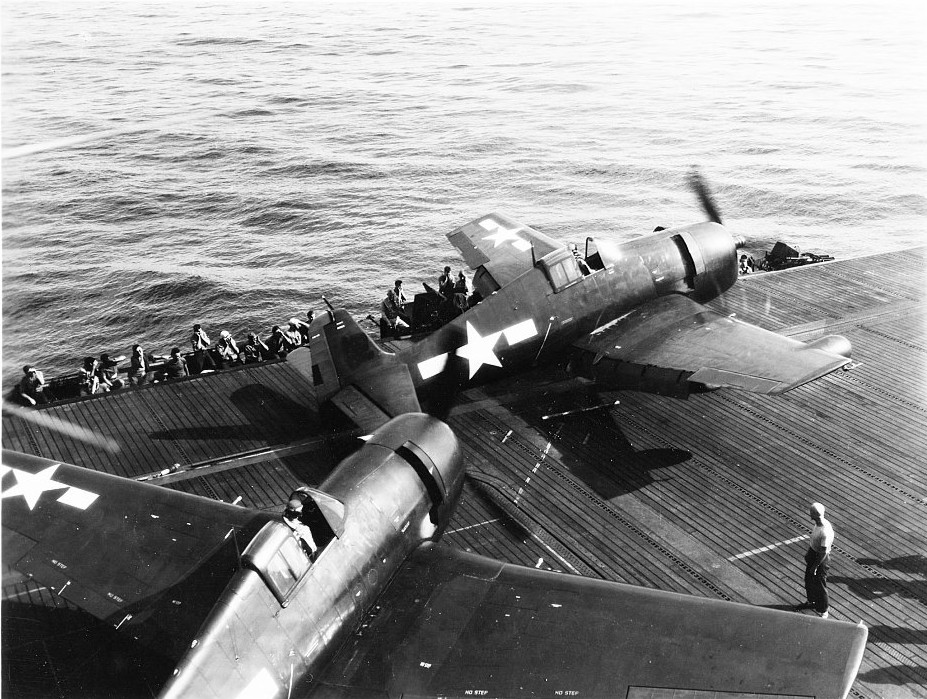
Two Grumman F6F Hellcats photographed on-board Steamer Bay. These aircraft were not part of her aircraft contingent, and are being transported, evident by the lack of squadron or carrier markings. The rightmost aircraft, positioned on the aircraft catapult, is a F6F-5N night-fighter variant.

After being commissioned, Steamer Bay conducted trials and went on a shakedown cruise down the West Coast, before arriving at San Diego. On 14 May, she sailed for the New Hebrides, transporting Marine Air Group (MAG) 61. She arrived at Espiritu Santo on 30 May, where her cargo was unloaded. She departed on 2 June, arriving at San Diego on 20 June. On 19 July, she loaded 298 marines and 72 aircraft, and proceeded westwards for the Marshall Islands. She hence arrived at Majuro on 1 August, where she discharged her cargo. She headed for Pearl Harbor, where she was attached to the United States Third Fleet to store replacement aircraft to support the ongoing Mariana and Palau Islands campaign and the Philippines campaign. Seventy-two planes were loaded onto Steamer Bay, and she sailed for Seeadler Harbor, Manus Island, arriving on 21 August. Throughout the next two and a half months, she remained on station, providing replacement aircraft and crew for Task Group 38. After completing her duties, she returned to Pearl Harbor, where she underwent repairs and training from 15 November to 5 December.

Steamer Bay departed back to Seeadler Harbor, arriving on 17 December. There, she was assigned to Task Group 77.4 (Taffy 2), commanded by Rear Admiral Felix Stump, which had previously participated in the Battle of Leyte Gulf. The task force consisted of six escort carriers and their escorts. On 1 January 1945, the task force sortied out of Seeadler Harbor, in support of the Invasion of Lingayen Gulf. En route, the escort carriers came under heavy aerial attacks. Of the six carriers within Taffy 2, Ommaney Bay was sunk by a kamikaze plane on 4 January, and Manila Bay and Savo Island were damaged by additional kamikazes on 5 January. Steamer Bay herself narrowly missed being hit, with a kamikaze once flying dangerously close to her stern. Throughout the landings, the escort carrier task groups anchored offshore launched over 1,400 aircraft sorties in support of the operation. In the middle of operations, Taffy 2 was reformed under Rear Admiral Felix Stump, partially because of the losses and damages suffered by the escort carriers. In anticipation for possible Japanese counterattacks on American positions on Mindoro and Luzon, the task group proceeded south to operate in the waters offshore Mindoro. Steamer Bay remained in the Philippine Islands with the rest of the 7th Fleet until 31 January, when she departed for Ulithi.

Steamer Bay was only anchored for five days, before she departed with the rest of the 5th Fleet, bound for Iwo Jima. She was incorporated into Carrier Division 26, under the command of Rear Admiral Clifton Sprague, alongside four other escort carriers. The task group began operations, 50 mi (80 km) west of Iwo Jima, on 16 February. The task group's mission was to neutralize Japanese bases and positions along the Nanpō Islands until 19 February (D-Day). The task group then provided close air support for the marines throughout the landings and the costly struggle throughout the island.

Steamer Bay, along with Anzio, was relieved on 7 March, and then proceeded to Leyte. They arrived at San Pedro Bay on 12 March, where she prepared for the upcoming invasion of Okinawa Island. She sailed for the Ryukyu Islands on 27 March, arriving in her operating area south of the island on the morning of 1 April. Operations were complicated by uncooperative weather and choppy seas. On 3 April, a sailor was cast overboard when a railing broke. His body was not recovered. She conducted operations until 26 May when she was relieved, and sailed to Apra Harbor, Guam, for repairs and rest. On 10 June, she was ordered to join the 3rd Fleet east of Miyako Jima assisted her task group in neutralizing Japanese airfields on Sakishima Gunto. She conducted air strikes against the airfields from 14 June to 22 June, before sailing for Ulithi.

Steamer Bay left Ulithi on 3 July, part of the Logistics Support Group, responsible for resupplying the fast carrier forces with aircraft during operations against the Japanese mainland. On 20 July, she was detached and sailed, making stops at Guam and Pearl Harbor, for the West Coast, arriving at San Diego on 10 August.

=== Post war ===
Steamer Bay was in dry dock when the Japanese surrender was announced. When repairs were finished, she became a part of the Operation Magic Carpet fleet, which repatriated U.S. servicemen from around the Pacific. To support her new role, bunk beds were installed within the hangar deck to accommodate veterans returning from overseas. On 28 September, she sailed for Pearl Harbor, on her first Magic Carpet run.

After completing her Magic Carpet duties, Steamer Bay was assigned to the Pacific Reserve Fleet on 4 February 1946, and berthed at Tacoma, Washington. In January 1947, she was placed in reserve, and decommissioned. Her designation was changed to CVHE-87 on 12 June 1955. She was struck from the Navy list on 1 March 1959, and sold to Hyman-Michaels Co., Chicago, Illinois, on 29 August 1959, for scrapping. She received six battle stars for her World War II service.

== Sources ==
=== Online sources ===
- "Steamer Bay (CVE-87)". Dictionary of American Naval Fighting Ships. Naval History and Heritage Command. 27 April 2016. Archived from the original on 3 March 2016.
- "Kaiser Vancouver, Vancouver WA". www.ShipbuildingHistory.com. 27 November 2010. Archived from the original on 16 June 2019.
- "World Aircraft Carriers List: US Escort Carriers, S4 Hulls". Hazegray.org. 14 December 1998. Archived from the original on 19 November 2021.

=== Bibliography ===
- Adcock, Al (1996), Escort Carriers in Action - Warships No. 9, Carrollton, Texas: Squadron/Signal Publications, ISBN 9780897473569
- Chesneau, Robert; Gardiner, Robert (1980), Conway's All the World's Fighting Ships 1922–1946, London, England: Naval Institute Press, ISBN 9780870219139
- Friedman, Norman (1983), U.S. Aircraft Carriers: An Illustrated Design History, Annapolis, Maryland: Naval Institute Press, ISBN 9780870217395
- Ross, Al (1993), The Escort Carrier Gambier Bay, Anatomy of the Ship, London, England: Conway Maritime Press, ISBN 9781557502353
- Y'Blood, William (2012), The Little Giants: U.S. Escort Carriers Against Japan, Annapolis, Maryland: Naval Institute Press, ISBN 9781612512471
