= ARA Buenos Aires =

Several ships of the Argentine Navy ((in Spanish) Armada de la República Argentina) have been named Buenos Aires, with or without the prefix "ARA", after the Argentine province of that name.

- ARA Buenos Aires (1895), a protected cruiser in service from 1896 to 1932.
- ARA Buenos Aires (D-6), a Buenos Aires-class destroyer in service from 1938 to 1971.
