= Operation Kikusui =

Japanese suicidal air attacks in WW2

- Part of the Battle of Okinawa, Pacific theater, World War II
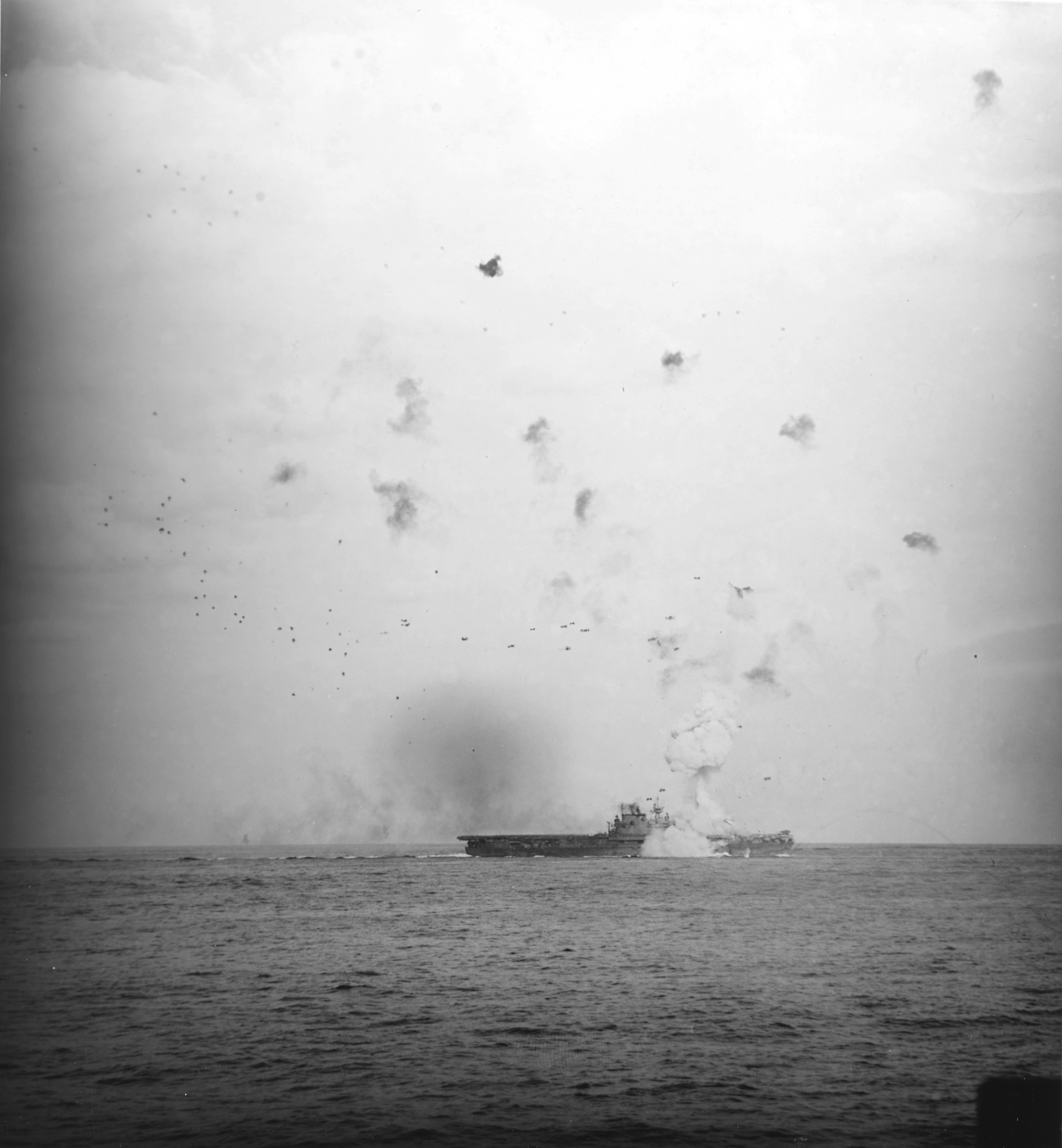
- US Navy aircraft carrier Enterprise struck by kamikaze aircraft
Date	6 April 1945 to 22 June 1945
Location	seas around Okinawa
Result	Allied victory

Belligerents
United States; United Kingdom	Japan

Commanders and leaders
Marc Mitscher	Matome Ugaki

Units involved
United States Pacific Fleet British Pacific Fleet	Imperial Japanese Navy: Carrier Division 5; 1st Air Fleet; 5th Air Fleet; Imperial Japanese Army: 6th Air Army; 8th Flying Division

Strength
	1,827 kamikaze aircraft (often accompanied by other aircraft）

Casualties and losses
Allied casualties attributed to Kikusui attacks and other sorties per Zaloga: 7,000+ sailors killed; 11 destroyers sunk; 6 other vessels sunk; 279 other vessels damaged; American casualties from kamikaze attacks (1944-1945) per Wolk and Hallion: 4,907 sailors killed; 4,824 sailors wounded; 218 ships damaged; 36 ships sunk; 763 carrier aircraft	Casualties from Kikusui attacks and additional sorties: 3,860 aircrew killed; ~2,500 aircraft destroyed

Operation Kikusui (菊水作戦, Kikusui sakusen) was a series of mass suicidal air attacks (kamikaze) by Imperial Japanese naval and army air forces during the Battle of Okinawa against Allied fleets in the waters around Okinawa.

== Background ==
Following the Battle of Leyte Gulf in October 1944, the remainder of the Imperial Japanese Navy was effectively crippled, and was no longer able to interdict Allied forces at sea, leaving both Okinawa and the Japanese home islands without naval protection against an Allied amphibious assault. Despite the evisceration of the Imperial Japanese Navy, the Japanese military still possessed land-based aircraft in significant numbers. However, most available planes were outdated, often piloted by untrained aircrew, and frequently grounded due to lack of fuel. In light of these factors, beginning in late 1944, the Japanese began to employ their remaining aircraft in suicidal kamikaze attacks against Allied ships, instead of as conventional fighters or bombers.

The naval engagements at Leyte saw the first widespread employment of kamikaze tactics. Kamikazes sunk the escort carriers USS St. Lo and USS Ommaney Bay during and immediately after the battle, and other kamikaze attacks sunk the escort carrier USS Bismarck Sea and damaged the fleet carrier USS Saratoga off of Iwo Jima in February 1945. The success of these strikes, along with the deteriorating numbers and quality of Japan's remaining aircraft and aircrew, convinced the Imperial General Headquarters that kamikaze strikes were an effective means to counter Allied amphibious operations.

After carrier aircraft from the U.S. Navy's Task Force 58 mounted a series of punishing air raids on Kyushu in March 1945, Japanese military planners concluded that contesting American airpower over the home islands with conventional tactics was fruitless. Instead, the Japanese began to stockpile planes to be used in large-scale kamikaze attacks against the next Allied amphibious landing, which occurred in early April 1945 on Okinawa.

On 7 April 1945, the Imperial General Headquarters commenced Operation Ten-Go, a sortie by the IJN's last remaining surface vessels, against Allied forces attacking Okinawa. Concurrent with this naval attack, the Japanese launched massed kamikaze strikes against the Allied fleet covering the amphibious landings. Air groups mobilized included Carrier Division 5, 1st Mobile Land-based Air Fleet (Kyushu, commanded by Vice Admiral Matome Ugaki), 5th Land-based Air Fleet (Formosa), and the Imperial Japanese Army 6th Aviation Army's 8th Flying Division (Formosa, commanded by Lieutenant General Kenji Yamamoto). These forces undertook preparations for Operation Kikusui (which was an Imperial Japanese Navy code name; the Imperial Japanese Army referred to it as the "total air assault"), and stationed over 3,000 various combat aircraft in Kyushu.

On 1 April 1945, the Imperial General Headquarters issued commands for "the conversion to special attack aircraft of all Army and Navy warplanes". From then on, the vast majority of Japanese warplanes were used as kamikaze aircraft. On that same day, the Allies commenced Operation Iceberg, the invasion of Okinawa. In an attempt to hold back the Allied advance, orders for the Imperial Japanese Navy's "Operation Kikusui I" and the Imperial Japanese Army's "1st total air assault" were issued on the morning of 6 April. Simultaneously, the Hibiscus Fleet, consisting of new attack planes (Tenzans, Gingas, Hiryuus and Suiseis) belonging to the Imperial Japanese Navy participated in night attacks against the Allied fleet.

The name of the operation, "Kikusui" (Japanese: 菊水, "Chrysanthemum Water"), comes from the hata-jirushi of the samurai Kusunoki Masashige.

== Battles ==
=== Operation Kikusui I ===
On 6 April 1945, the Japanese military commenced Operation Kikusui I (referred to by the Army as the "1st Total Air Assault"), with 391 Navy planes and 133 Army planes (of which 215 Navy planes and 82 Army planes were kamikazes) taking part. US Navy anti-air radar picket destroyers deployed in the waters off Okinawa bore the brunt of the attack. At 12:26 pm, the destroyer Haynsworth became the first warship struck. The destroyers Bush and Colhoun were sunk by kamikazes and the destroyers Newcomb and Leutze took heavy damage; the battleship Maryland and 10 other destroyers were targeted by kamikazes as well. The US Navy claimed the loss of 3 destroyers, 1 amphibious warfare ship and 2 munitions transports, along with over 10 other ships heavily damaged.

During Operation Kikusui I, the Surface Special Attack Force, consisting of the battleship Yamato, the light cruiser Yahagi, and 8 destroyers, under the command of Vice-Admiral Seiichi Itō, left for Okinawa to support ground defense operations there, but were repulsed by over 300 carrier aircraft belonging to Admiral Mitscher's Task Force 58 at Bou-no-Misaki, between Kyushu and the Ryukyu Islands, on 7 April; this came to be known in Japan as the Naval Battle of Bou-no-Misaki. The Imperial Japanese Navy lost the battleship Yamato, the light cruiser Yahagi, and 4 destroyers. The Japanese military continued air attacks between 8 and 11 April, and on 11 April the aircraft carrier Enterprise and the battleship Missouri were damaged by kamikaze aircraft, and the aircraft carrier Essex took hull damage below the waterline.

=== Operation Kikusui II ===
Operation Kikusui II commenced on 12 April, and consisted of 354 Navy planes and 124 Army planes (of which 103 Navy planes and 72 Army planes were kamikazes). Main achievements by the operation include hits on the battleships Tennessee and Idaho; and at least eight other U.S. Navy warships. The human-operated flying bomb Ohka first appeared in Operation Kikusui II; this flying bomb was carried by bombers and was more difficult for US forces to shoot down due to its small size, light weight and high speed. The destroyer Mannert L. Abele became the first and only US Navy ship to be sunk by this type of bomb.

=== Operation Kikusui III ===
Operation Kikusui III commenced on 16 April, and consisted of 415 Navy planes and 92 Army planes (of which 176 Navy planes and 52 Army planes were kamikazes). Main achievements by the operation include sinking the destroyer Pringle, as well as damaging the aircraft carrier Intrepid and destroyer Laffey, the latter taking six kamikaze and four bomb hits from 22 attackers, earning her the nickname "The Ship That Would Not Die".

=== Operation Kikusui IV ===
Operation Kikusui IV took place from 21 to 29 April, and consisted of 845 Navy planes (of which 126 were kamikazes) and 11 Army planes. Only 3 destroyers were damaged.

Due to Japanese kamikaze attacks in April 1945, US Navy losses in the seas around Okinawa began to climb. With the start of Operation Kikusui V, the US Navy carrier fleet began to receive attention by the kamikazes.

=== Operation Kikusui V ===
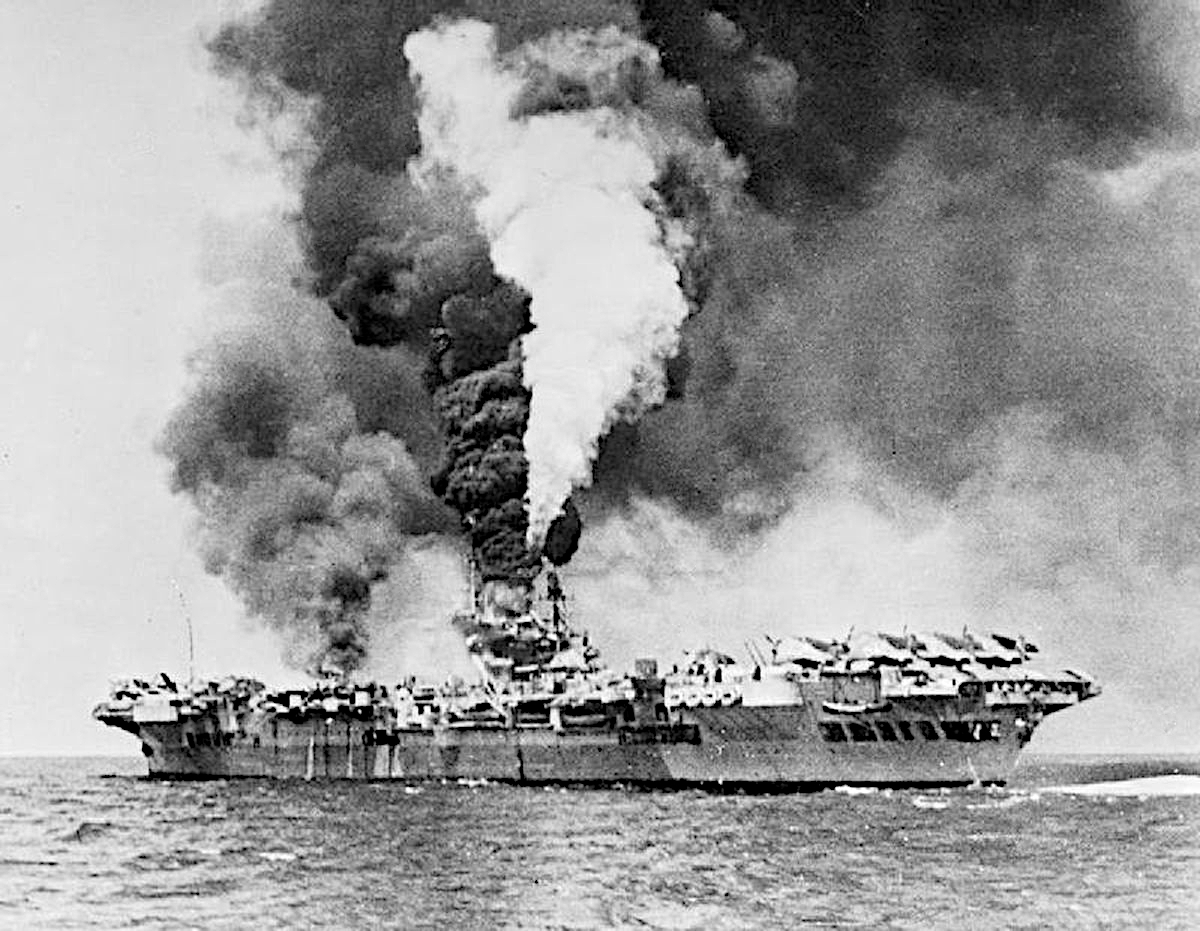
Royal Navy aircraft carrier Formidable set ablaze by kamikaze attacks

On 3 May, 449 planes of the Okinawa Aviation Fleet (including 160 kamikazes) commenced Operation Kikusui V. Main achievements include sinking 2 destroyers, damaging 1 escort aircraft carrier, and damaging the British aircraft carrier Formidable.

=== Operation Kikusui VI ===
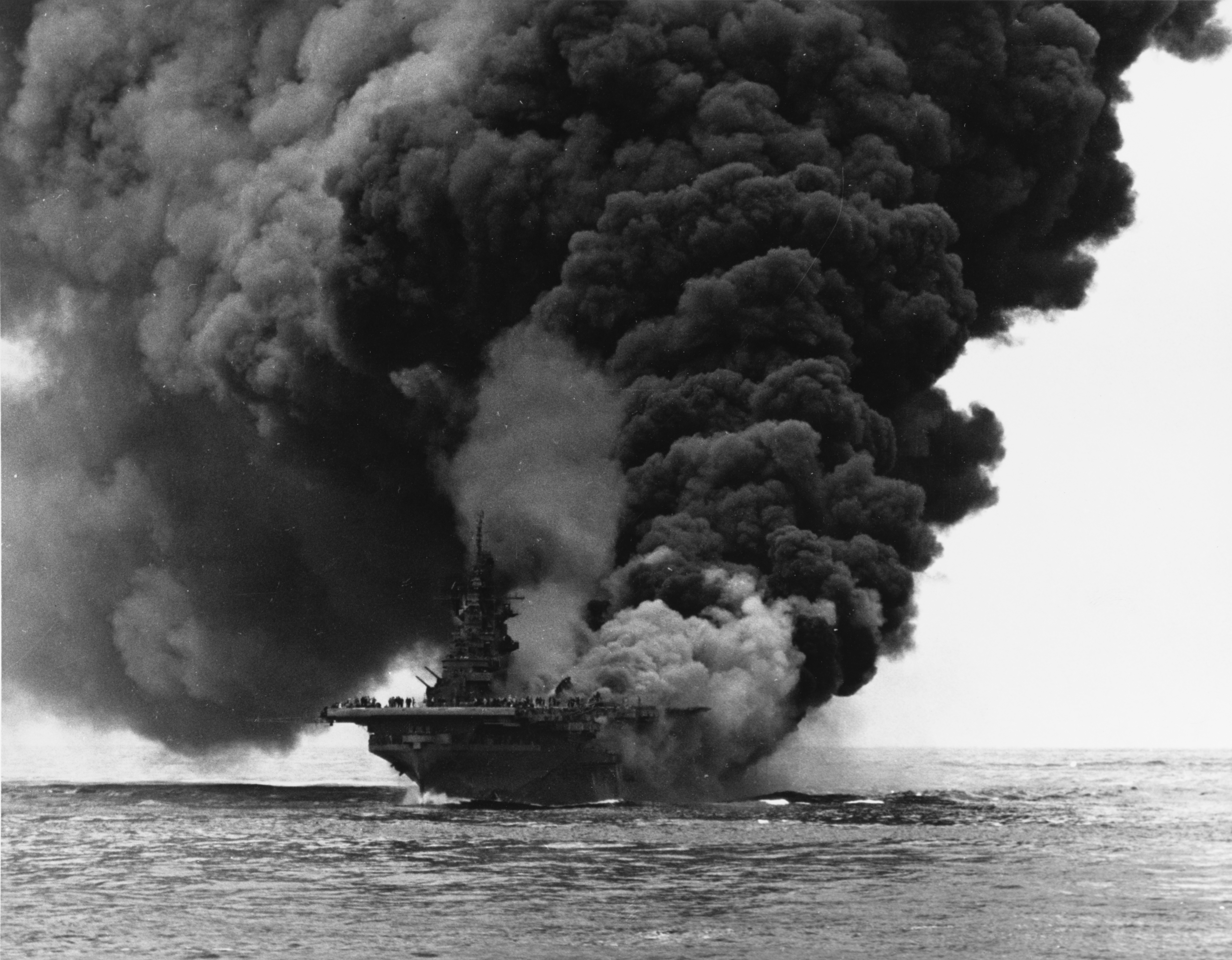
United States Navy aircraft carrier Bunker Hill set ablaze by kamikaze attacks

Operation Kikusui VI commenced on 11 May, and consisted of 345 planes (including 86 kamikazes); attacks from 12 to 15 May consisted of 237 planes (including 47 kamikazes). The most significant achievement in these attacks was major damage to Mitscher's flagship, the aircraft carrier Bunker Hill: 2 kamikaze aircraft; the first piloted by Sub Lieutenant Seizō Yasunori, the second by Ensign Kiyoshi Ogawa struck Bunker Hill and triggered large explosions, but did not sink her as a result of improved damage control capabilities on part of US Navy personnel; however, the damage was severe enough that Bunker Hill did not return to the battlefield before the end of the war. Mitscher transferred his flag to the aircraft carrier Enterprise after being evacuated off Bunker Hill. Among the crew, 352 sailors and pilots were killed, 41 disappeared and 264 were wounded.

On 14 May, Mitscher's flagship, Enterprise, was heavily damaged by one kamikaze pilot, Lt. Shunsuke Tomiyasu, resulting in 13 deaths and 68 people wounded. The ship withdrew from the battlefield. As a result, Mitscher transferred his flag to the carrier Randolph.

=== Operation Kikusui VII ===
Operation Kikusui VII took place between 23 and 25 May, and consisted of 387 Navy planes and 174 Army planes (of which 107 Navy planes and 61 Army planes were kamikazes). However, the achievements were quite small compared to the previous operation, with only 1 transport sunk and 1 escort aircraft carrier damaged.

=== Operation Kikusui VIII ===
Operation Kikusui VIII took place between 28 and 29 May, and consisted of 217 Navy planes and 71 Army planes (of which 51 Navy planes and 57 Army planes were kamikazes). Due to reduced airstrike capabilities on part of the Japanese military, achievements were small, only sinking 1 destroyer, the USS Drexler and damaging several ships.

=== Operation Kikusui IX ===
Operation Kikusui IX took place between 3 and 7 June, and consisted of 367 Navy planes and 71 Army planes (of which 23 Navy planes and 31 Army planes were kamikazes). Main achievements include damage to the battleship USS Mississippi on 5 June, one escort aircraft carrier and the heavy cruiser USS Louisville on 5 June. In the Okinawa land offensive, the United States had taken the prefectural capital, Naha, and the Japanese were forced into the southernmost tip of Okinawa Island.

=== Operation Kikusui X ===
Due to the Japanese defeat in the Okinawa land offensive, the Imperial General Headquarters launched one final Kikusui operation between 16 and 22 June, while making preparations for a final showdown on the Japanese home islands. Operation Kikusui X consisted of 271 Navy planes (of which 67 were kamikazes); it achieved only 1 destroyer sunk; and one escort carrier ship damaged.

== Aftermath ==
In total, the Imperial Japanese Navy deployed 940 aircraft and the Imperial Japanese Army deployed 887 aircraft, each of varying types, in Operation Kikusui. Of these, 133 planes scored hits, and 122 planes scored near misses. Casualties include 2,045 Navy aviators and 1,022 Army aviators killed (not including losses other than kamikazes). If non-kamikaze aircraft are included, 2,258 aircraft were lost. On the Allied side, 36 ships were sunk (but no cruisers or larger were sunk), 218 ships were damaged (including 8 aircraft carriers, 3 battleships, 2 cruisers and 33 destroyers), and 763 carrier aircraft were lost; US Navy kamikaze casualties throughout the war include over 4,900 sailors killed or missing, and 4,824 wounded. However, historian Steven Zaloga puts the total number of US, Australian, and British naval casualties at more than 7,000 killed.

Although the Kikusui kamikazes inflicted severe damage, no heavy Allied ships were sunk. One reason for this is the outstanding damage control capabilities on part of the Allies, successfully preventing many ships from sinking. Another reason is the poor training and discipline of the Japanese aircrews, which led them to attempt to sink whatever ship was in sight without effectively identifying their targets; as a result, the massive number of Allied destroyers effectively diluted the kamikaze attacks on large Allied ships, and led to the preservation of most of the Allied naval aviation firepower despite losses.

Vice Admiral Matome Ugaki, the officer in charge of Operation Kikusui, performed one "final kamikaze attack" after hearing of Japan's surrender, piloting a Suisei, and was shot down and killed in the seas around Okinawa.
