= Brown-class destroyer =

Class of destroyers of the Argentinian Navy

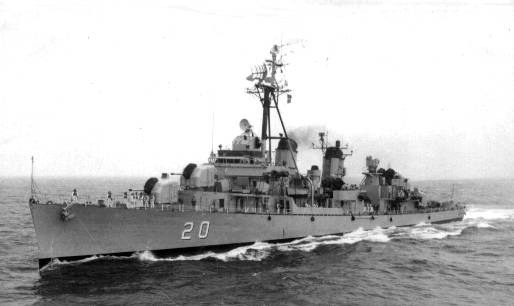
- ARA Almirante Brown

Class overview
- Name: Brown class
- Builders: Bath Iron Works; Bethlehem Steel; Federal Shipbuilding and Drydock Company
- Operators: Argentine Navy
- Preceded by: Buenos Aires class
- Succeeded by: Seguí class
- Subclasses: Almirante Domecq Garcia class
- Built: 1942-1943
- In commission: 1961-1982
- Planned: 5
- Completed: 5
- Retired: 5

General characteristics
- Type: Destroyer
- Displacement: 2,050 long tons (2,083 t)
- Length: 376 ft 6 in (114.76 m)
- Beam: 39 ft 8 in (12.09 m)
- Draft: 13 ft 9 in (4.19 m)
- Propulsion: 60,000 shp (45,000 kW); 2 × propellers
- Speed: 35 knots (65 km/h; 40 mph)
- Range: 6,500 nmi (12,000 km; 7,500 mi) at 15 knots (28 km/h; 17 mph)
- Complement: 300
- Sensors & processing systems: AN/SPS-6 air-search radar; AN/SPS-10 surface-search radar; Mark 37 fire-control system
- Armament: 4 × single 5 in (127 mm)/38 guns; 3 × twin 40 mm bofors; 1 × quin Mark 15 torpedo tubes; 2 Hedgehog anti-submarine mortar; 1 × Depth charge tracks

The Brown-class destroyer is a class of destroyers of the Argentine Navy. Five ships of the Fletcher class were lent by the United States Navy and were in commission from 1961 until 1982.

== Development ==
ARA Brown was commissioned as USS Heermann on 6 July 1943, ARA Espora was commissioned as USS Dortch on 7 August 1943, ARA Rosales was commissioned as USS Stembel on 16 July 1943, ARA Almirante Domecq Garcia was commissioned as USS Braine on 11 May 1943 and ARA Almirante Storni was commissioned as USS Cowell on 23 August 1943.

After World War II, they were in a mothball state, but in August 1961, they were handed over to Argentina based on the Argentina-US Ship Loan Agreement. All ships were decommissioned by the time of the Falklands War, to save resources for the war. ARA Almirante Storni fired warning shots and then live shots in the bow of the British oceanic research vessel Shackleton on 2 April 1976.

== Ships in the class ==
Almirante Brown class							
Hull no.	Name	Builder	Laid down	Launched	Acquired	Decommissioned	Fate
D-20	Brown	Bethlehem Steel	8 May 1942	5 December 1942	14 August 1961	1979	Scrapped, 1982
D-21	Espora	Federal Shipbuilding and Drydock Company	2 March 1943	20 June 1943	16 August 1961	1979	Scrapped, 1979
D-22	Rosales	Bethlehem Steel	21 December 1942	8 May 1943	7 August 1961	1981	Scrapped, 1981
Almirante Domecq Garcia class							
D-23	Almirante Domecq Garcia	Bath Iron Works	12 October 1942	7 March 1943	17 August 1971	1982	Sunk as target, 1983
D-24	Almirante Storni	Bethlehem Steel	7 September 1942	18 March 1943	17 August 1971	1981	Scrapped, 1982

== Bibliography ==
- Foster, Jeremiah D. (30 September 2019). "Heermann (DD-532)". Dictionary of American Naval Fighting Ships. Navy Department, Naval History and Heritage Command.
- Gardiner, Robert; Chumbley, Stephen & Budzbon, Przemysław, eds. (1995). Conway's All the World's Fighting Ships 1947–1995. Annapolis, Maryland: Naval Institute Press. ISBN 1-55750-132-7.
- Scheina, Robert L. & Smigelski, Adam (1995). "Argentina". In Chumbley, Stephen (ed.). Conway's All the World's Fighting Ships, 1947–1995 (revised ed.). Naval Institute Press. ISBN 1-55750-132-7.
