= ARA Rosales =

Three ships of the Argentine Navy have been named Rosales:

- ARA Rosales, an Espora-class torpedo boat launched in 1890 and wrecked in a storm in 1892
- ARA Rosales (D-22), the ex-American destroyer Stembel
- ARA Rosales (P-42), an Espora-class corvette (type MEKO 140) currently in service with the Argentine Navy
