= Mendoza-class destroyer =

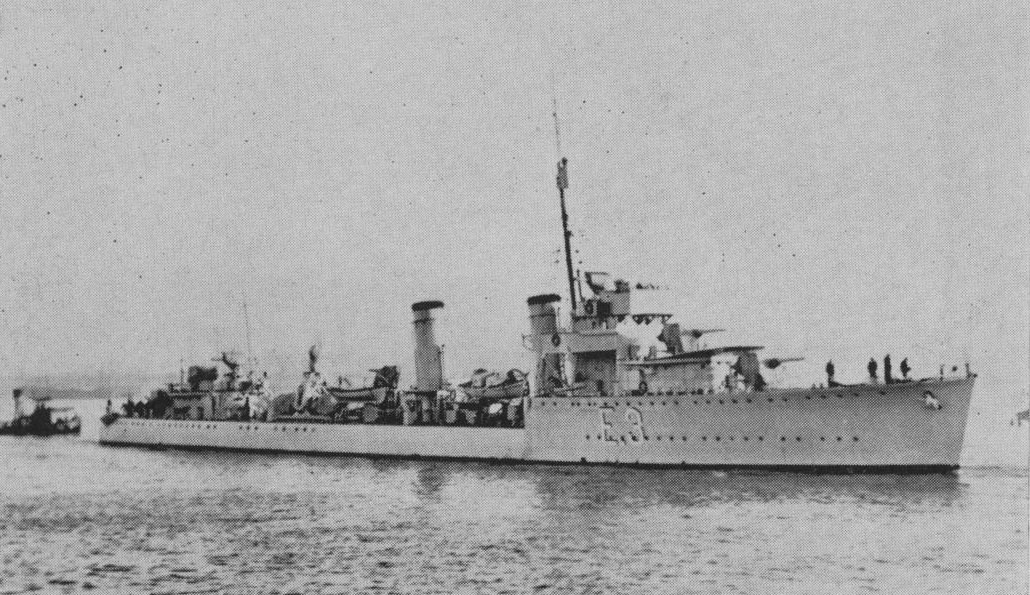
- Mendoza in 1932

Class overview
- Name: Mendoza class
- Builders: JS White, Cowes, England
- Operators: Argentine Navy
- Preceded by: Cervantes class
- Succeeded by: Buenos Aires class
- Built: 1927–1929
- In commission: 1929–1961
- Completed: 3
- Retired: 3

General characteristics as built
- Type: Destroyer
- Displacement: 1,595 t (1,570 long tons) (standard); 2,154 t (2,120 long tons) (full load)
- Length: 102.11 m (335 ft 0 in)
- Beam: 9.68 m (31 ft 9 in)
- Draught: 3.81 m (12 ft 6 in)
- Propulsion: 2 shaft Parsons geared steam turbines; 4 × 3-drum boilers, 42,000 hp (31,000 kW)
- Speed: 36 knots (67 km/h; 41 mph)
- Range: 4,500 nmi (8,300 km; 5,200 mi) at 14 kn (26 km/h; 16 mph)
- Complement: 160
- Armament: 5 × single 4.7 in (119 mm) QF Mark IX guns; 1 × 3 in (76 mm) AA gun; 2 × 2-pounder pom poms; 2 × triple 21 in (533 mm) torpedo tubes

The Mendoza class were a series of three destroyers built in the United Kingdom for the Argentine Navy in the 1920s. They were the first part of the Argentine re-armament programme of the 1920s. Construction began in 1927 and all three were commissioned in 1929. All three destroyers were converted to anti-aircraft escorts in 1958 and remained in service until 1962 when they were discarded.

== Design ==
The ships were based on the British Admiralty type flotilla leader (Note: Chesneau has the base design as the Scott class which is another name for the Admiralty type flotilla leader while Gardiner, Chumbley & Budzbon have the design basis as the Bruce class, which is another name for the Scott class.) design built at the end of World War I, with minor modifications. The Mendoza-class destroyers had a standard displacement of 1,595 tonnes (1,570 long tons) and were 2,154 tonnes (2,120 long tons) at full load. The vessels were 102.11 metres (335 ft 0 in) long overall and 101.2 metres (332 ft 0 in) long at the waterline. They had a beam of 9.68 metres (31 ft 9 in) and a mean draught of 3.81 m (12 ft 6 in).

The Mendoza class were equipped with Parsons single-reduction geared turbines powered by steam provided by four 250 psi (1,724 kPa) three-drum boilers. The turbines turned two shafts rated at 42,000 shaft horsepower (31,319 kW) giving the destroyers a maximum designed speed of 36 knots (67 km/h; 41 mph). The ships carried 549 tonnes (540 long tons) of fuel oil and had a range of 4,500 nautical miles (8,300 km; 5,200 mi) at 14 knots (26 km/h; 16 mph). The destroyers had a complement of 160 officers and ratings.

Ships of the Mendoza class were equipped with five 4.7-inch (119 mm) QF Mark IX guns located in single turrets along the centreline of the ship. The Mendoza-class destroyers were also given one 3-inch (76 mm) gun for anti-aircraft (AA) defence and two 2-pounder pom poms. They were also armed with six 21-inch (533 mm) torpedo tubes in two triple mounts. The 3-inch, both 2-pounder and "Q" gun were later swapped out for six 40 mm Bofors guns in 3 twin mountings for AA defense, arranged either side and abaft the second funnel.

== Ships in class ==
Construction data
Ship	Pennant number	Builder	Launched	Commissioned	Fate
Mendoza	E-3	J. Samuel White & Co, Cowes	18 July 1928	24 January 1929	Discarded, 30 April 1962
La Rioja	E-4	J. Samuel White & Co, Cowes	2 February 1929	23 July 1929	Discarded, 30 April 1962
Tucuman	E-5	J. Samuel White & Co, Cowes	16 October 1928	3 May 1929	Discarded, 30 April 1962

== Service history ==
Contracts were placed with J. Samuel White in 1927 as part of the Argentine Navy's modernisation programme. The three vessels took on the names of destroyers under construction during World War I that had been appropriated by France and Germany. All three ships exceeded their design speed during sea trials, with La Rioja reaching the fastest speed at 39.4 knots (73.0 km/h; 45.3 mph) without exceeding the limits of its engines. After all three ships had been accepted by the Argentine Navy, the three destroyers sailed for Argentina together from the United Kingdom, stopping only at Lisbon, Portugal en route. Argentina remained neutral during World War II.

In 1952, the Mendoza class' designation was changed from Exploradores (destroyer) to Torpederos (destroyer escort) in 1952 and their pennant numbers changed from "E" to "T" to reflect that. La Rioja and Tucuman were laid up that year and disarmed. The class were converted to anti-submarine escorts in 1958. Mendoza remained in service until 1961, when the last of the class was decommissioned. The class was discarded on 30 April 1962 and replaced with former United States Navy ships that were acquired cheaply.

== See also ==
- List of ships of the Argentine Navy
- Buenos Aires-class destroyer

== Bibliography ==
- Blackman, Raymond V. B., ed. (1953). Jane's Fighting Ships 1953–54. London: Sampson, Low and Marston. OCLC 913556389.
- Chesneau, Roger, ed. (1980). Conway's All the World's Fighting Ships 1922–1946. Greenwich, UK: Conway Maritime Press. ISBN 0-85177-146-7.
- Gardiner, Robert; Chumbley, Stephen & Budzbon, Przemysław, eds. (1995). Conway's All the World's Fighting Ships 1947–1995. Annapolis, Maryland: Naval Institute Press. ISBN 1-55750-132-7.
- Whitley, M. J. (2000) [1988]. Destroyers of World War Two: An International Encyclopedia. Annapolis, Maryland: Naval Institute Press. ISBN 0-87021-326-1.
