= Roger N. Stembel =

Roger Nelson Stembel
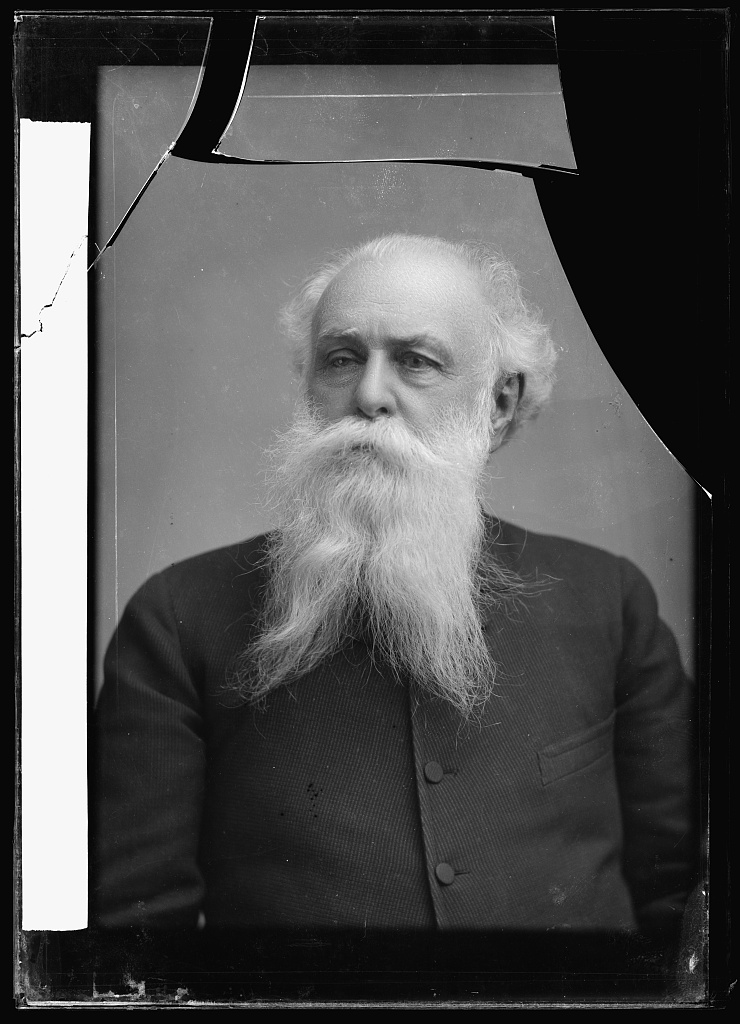
- Born: December 27, 1810; Middletown, Maryland
- Died: November 20, 1900 (aged 89); Manhattan, New York City
- Burial place: Arlington National Cemetery
- Military career
- Allegiance: United States of America
- Branch: United States Navy
- Service years: 1832–1872
- Rank: Rear Admiral
- Commands: Cincinnati; Canandaigua; Pacific Fleet
- Conflicts: Seminole Wars; American Civil War

Roger Nelson Stembel (December 27, 1810 – November 20, 1900) was an officer of the United States Navy during the Civil War.

== Early life ==
Stembel, born in Middletown, Maryland, was appointed midshipman in the United States Navy on March 27, 1832. He served in the West Indies, Mediterranean, Home, Brazil, China, and East India Squadrons and participated in the Seminole Wars prior to the Civil War.

== Civil War ==
During the Civil War, Stembel served in the Western Gunboat Flotilla during 1861 and 1862. He participated in the engagements of Lucas' Bend, September 9, 1861; Belmont, November 1861; Fort Henry, February 1862; and the bombardment and capture of Island No. 10 in March and April 1862. While commanding the Cincinnati, Stembel was seriously wounded in an engagement with Confederate rams near Fort Pillow on May 10, 1862, and invalided in 1863.

Stembel was assigned shore duty at Pittsburgh, Pennsylvania in 1864 and 1865. After being promoted to captain in 1866, he commanded Canandaigua in the European Squadron from 1865 to 1867. He was stationed at Boston, Massachusetts in 1869 and was promoted to Commodore in 1871. In that year, he assumed command of the North Squadron of the Pacific Fleet; and, in 1872, he assumed command of the Pacific Fleet as well. With the fall of Confederate Fort Henry he, along with Captain Seth Ledyard Phelps, were sent by flag officer Andrew Hull Foote to hoist the American flag over the captured fort, marking the turning point of the Civil War.

Stembel retired on December 27, 1872, and was promoted to rear admiral on June 5, 1874. After retirement, he lived in Washington, D.C. and spent his summers in Narragansett, Rhode Island. In October 1900, Admiral Stembel and his wife stopped at the Fifth Avenue Hotel in Manhattan on their way back to Washington from Rhode Island. His wife fractured her hip in a fall and, while waiting for her recovery, he contracted a cold and then pneumonia, dying at the hotel on November 20, 1900. His wife Laura also contracted pneumonia and died a month later. Stembel and his wife are buried in Arlington National Cemetery, Virginia.

The destroyer USS Stembel (DD-644) was named in his honor. Stembel was the son-in-law of James McBride of Hamilton, Ohio, and therefore connected with several prominent politicians related to the Lytle family.

== See also ==
- Ulysses S. Grant
- Bibliography of the American Civil War

== Sources ==
- Slagle, Jay (1996). Ironclad Captain: Seth Ledyard Phelps & the U.S. Navy, 1841-1864. Kent State University Press. ISBN 978-0-8733-8550-3.
