= Kiyoshi Ogawa =

Japanese kamikaze pilot (1922–1945)

- 小川 清
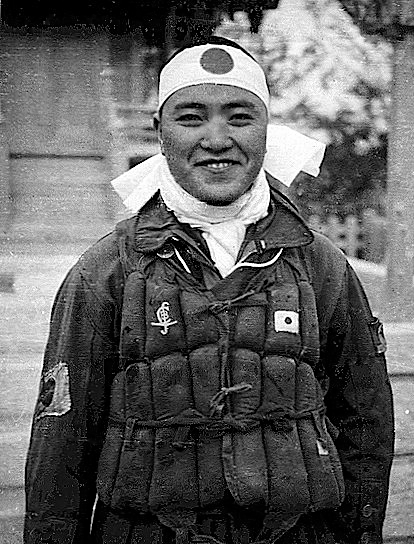
- Ogawa wearing a hachimaki
- Born: October 23, 1922; Usui District, Gunma Prefecture, Japan
- Died: May 11, 1945 (aged 22); USS Bunker Hill, near Okinawa, Ryukyu Islands
- Military career
- Allegiance: Empire of Japan
- Branch: Imperial Japanese Navy Air Service (IJN)
- Service years: 1944–1945
- Rank: Ensign
- Unit: 721st Kōkūtai
- Conflicts: World War II; Battle of Okinawa †
- Awards: Died in battle award

Kiyoshi Ogawa (小川 清, Ogawa Kiyoshi; October 23, 1922 – May 11, 1945) was a Japanese naval aviator ensign (少尉) of the Imperial Japanese Navy during World War II. As a kamikaze pilot, Ensign Ogawa's final action took place on May 11, 1945, during the Battle of Okinawa. Piloting a bomb-laden Mitsubishi Zero fighter during Operation Kikusui No. 6, Ogawa flew through American anti-aircraft fire and struck the aircraft carrier USS Bunker Hill, less than one minute after his flight leader, sub-lieutenant Seizō Yasunori, crashed into the ship. Ogawa dropped a 250-kilogram (551 lb) bomb, never pulled out of the dive, and crashed deliberately into the flight deck near the control tower of the aircraft carrier. The bomb penetrated Bunker Hill's flight deck and exploded. Gasoline fires flamed up and several explosions took place when re-armed and re-fueled planes on deck exploded and caught fire. 393 American sailors died with Yasunori and Ogawa, 264 were wounded, while the carrier was under repair for the remainder of the war.

== Early life and education ==
Ogawa was born on October 23, 1922, in Usui District (modern-day Takasaki City), Gunma Prefecture, as the youngest child of the Oshia family. Kiyoshi did well in school, and entered Waseda University (Shinjuku Ward), near Kagurazaka.

== Career ==
=== World War II ===
After graduating, Ogawa departed as a gakuto (student-soldier, a college student who became a soldier or officer during his academic years) and received his training as a 14th graduate of aviation reserve student training. Special flight officer probationary cadets (the graduates from college) tended to have more liberal ideas, not having been educated in military schools, and also were more aware of the world outside Japan. Although some officers were kind to student soldiers during training, many acted harshly toward them; once on the base, many reserve students were subjected to harsh corporal punishment on a daily basis, as any minor action that irritated a superior could be a cause for severe corporal punishment.

Ogawa graduated from aviation reserve student flight training, was appointed an ensign and was assigned to the 306th Fighter Squadron of the Imperial Japanese Navy's 721st Kōkūtai at Kanoya.

Ogawa then volunteered for Imperial Japanese Navy Kamikaze Special Attack Force (tokubetsu kōgeki tai) Dai 7 Showa-tai (No. 7 Showa-tai Force).

There were two methods to collect volunteers. One was an application for all pilots in general, and another was a survey for the special flight officer probationary cadets (college graduates like Kiyoshi Ogawa) only. The survey asked: "Do you desire earnestly/wish/do not wish to be involved in the Kamikaze attacks?" Kiyoshi Ogawa had to circle one of the three choices, or leave the paper blank. The reason that the special flight officer probationary cadet had to answer such a survey rather than send the applications at their own will was because the military had known that the students who had come from college had a wider vision, and would not easily apply for such a mission. Some college graduates, who did not volunteer willingly, were pressured to circle "desire earnestly" in the survey.

Many former students from Japan's elite colleges such as Tokyo, Kyoto, Keio and Waseda volunteered as kamikaze pilots in World War II.

==== Ogawa's kamikaze attack ====
On the morning of May 11, 1945, USS Bunker Hill, the flagship of Vice Admiral Marc Mitscher, participated as part of TG 58.3 in carrier operations 122 kilometres east of Okinawa, supporting the Okinawa invasion. Bunker Hill and the Fifth Fleet sortied from Ulithi in February 1945, for strikes against Okinawa and the Home Islands. Bunker Hill had provided aircraft for the massive effort to sink the Japanese battleship Yamato on April 7.

On May 11, the Imperial Japanese Navy carried out a massive kamikaze mission called Kikusui Rokugi Sakusen (Operation Kikusui "Floating Chrysanthemums" No. 6). On the early morning, pilots of the Tokkōtai suicide squadrons took off from their bases; among those pilots, there was Kiyoshi Ogawa, a member of the Dai-nana Showa-tai Squadron, flying a Zero, modified to carry a 250 kg (550 pound) bomb underneath the fuselage.

Off the coast of Okinawa, Ogawa, along with Seizō Yasunori, another Zero pilot, his squadron leader, sighted Bunker Hill. On May 11, 1945, Bunker Hill had been at sea and in continuous action for 58 days. With a slight lull that day, the ship was at condition One Easy, with ventilators open and the crew, including Vice-Admiral Marc Mitscher, commander of Task Force 58, trying to relax. At 1004, Marine Captain James E. Swett, flying his F4U-1C Corsair on combat air patrol, frantically radioed "Alert! Alert! Two planes diving on the Bunker Hill!"

Ogawa and his patrol leader had just swept down on Bunker Hill so quickly that her gunners barely had time to respond. At 10:04 hours Ogawa's patrol leader released a 550-lb bomb which smashed through the flight deck and out the side, exploding just above the water. The aircraft crashed into the flight deck and skidded over the side, destroying nearly all of the 34 fully armed and fueled planes parked on the flight deck. At the same time, Ogawa was completing his dive with his Zero through the AA fire, aiming for the flight deck near the bridge of the ship to cause the most damage, as kamikaze pilots were trained to do. At nearly a vertical dive, Ogawa dropped his 550-lb bomb just before impact with the flight deck, crashing near the island at about 10:05 hours.

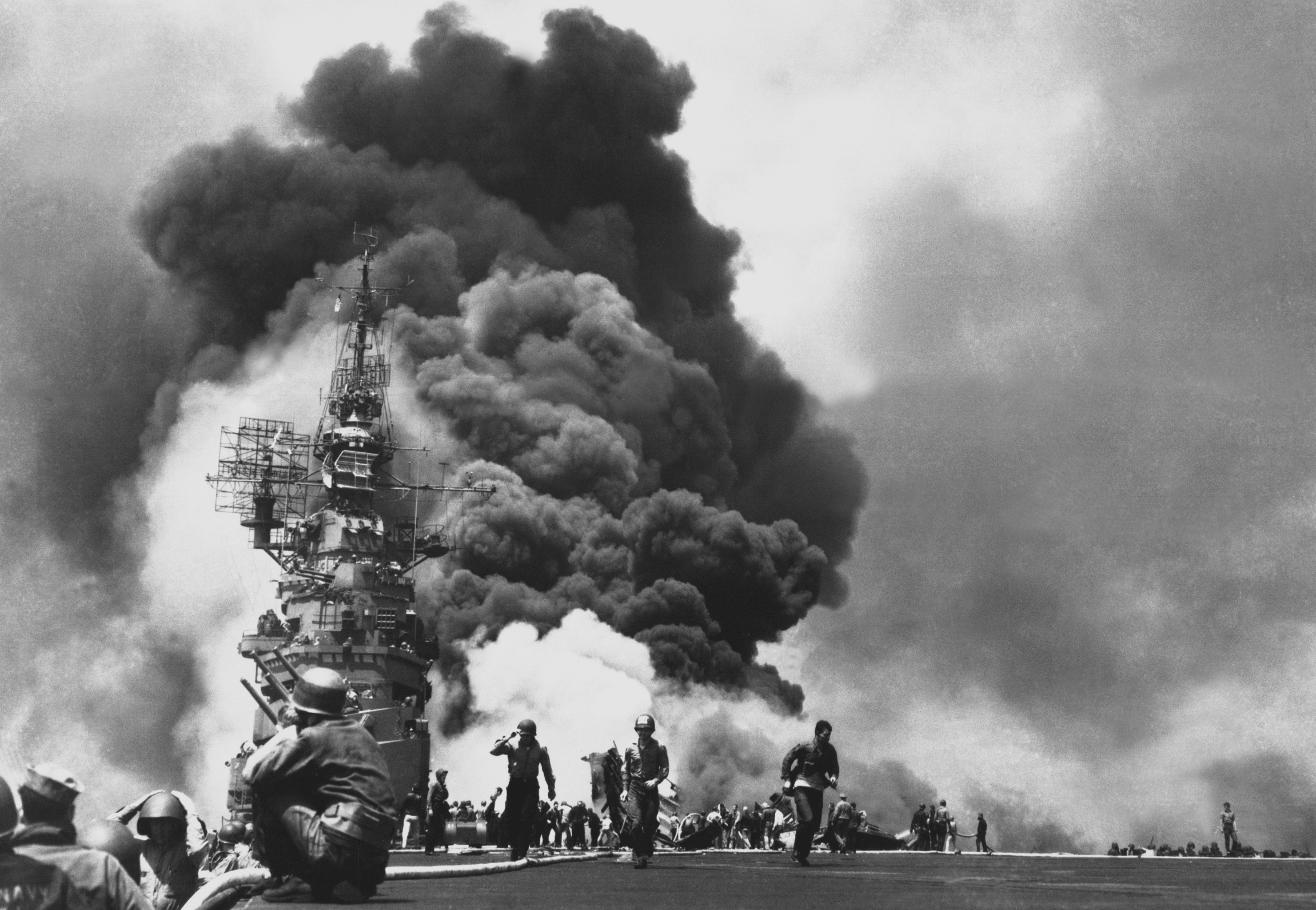
Ogawa's bomb devastated the Bunker Hill.

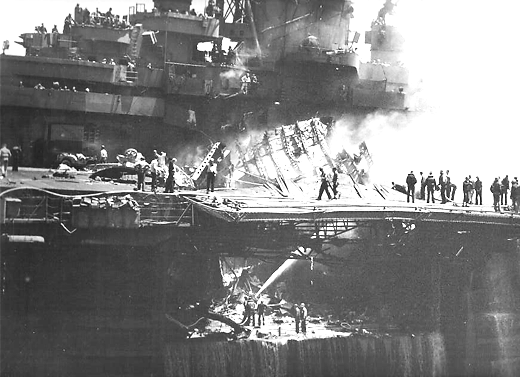
Ogawa hit the flight deck near the bridge.

The 250 kg (550 lb) bomb penetrated Bunker Hill's flight deck and exploded. Gasoline fires flared up and several explosions occurred. The bomb smashed through the flight deck, but did not make it through the hangar deck where it exploded. Bunker Hill's armor protecting the machinery spaces below had proven effective. A significant improvement of Essex-class ships like the Bunker Hill over the other US carriers at the time was that they were equipped with a more heavily armored deck, plus a second armored deck on the hangar level designed to detonate bombs before they reached the vital machinery and electronic spaces below.

Ogawa's bomb blew a large hole into the flight deck close to the bridge. On the flagbridge, Vice-Admiral Mitscher barely escaped, but lost twelve of his staff officers including his own medical officer.

Many of Bunker Hill's pilots died either in their planes or inside the skin of the ship during the attack. 22 fighter pilots of Bunker Hill's air group, CVG-84, were killed in the ready room by the explosion of the bomb which consumed all of the oxygen and asphyxiated the men.

His flagship in bad shape, Vice Admiral Mitscher decided to leave the ship while he still could. The destroyer USS English went alongside Bunker Hill, to help in the fighting of fires and to take off Vice Admiral Mitscher, transferring his flag to the newly repaired carrier Enterprise.

Of Bunker Hill's crew, 352 were killed, 264 were wounded and 41 were missing. Hundreds of crewmen had been either blown overboard or were forced to jump to escape the fires. Captain James E. Swett collected about 24 of the circling airplanes, mostly F4U Corsairs, and they dropped dye markers and Mae Wests for the crewmen swimming in the oily water around the stricken carrier. Bunker Hill finally was saved and the crippled carrier sailed the 11,000 kilometres (7,000 mi) to Puget Sound Navy Yard under her own steam. Upon arrival, she was called the "most extensively damaged ship" ever to enter the yard, and her repairs took the rest of the war.

According to Robert Schock, a U.S. Navy diver on board Bunker Hill, Ogawa's aircraft was not completely destroyed after penetrating the flight deck, but remained partially intact and did not catch fire. Instead, the wreckage rested on the hangar deck of Bunker Hill, half awash in water, with live wires sparking all around. Schock found Ogawa dead in the cockpit, and removed Ogawa's name tag from his flight suit, along with a letter Ogawa carried with him on his last mission, some photographs, a belt from Ogawa's parachute harness, and a large smashed aviator watch of the type that Japanese pilots wore around their necks.

== Legacy ==
On March 27, 2001, Yoko Ogawa, Ogawa's grandniece, her mother, and Masao Kunimine, an old college friend of Kiyoshi Ogawa, received these personal effects in San Francisco, nearly 56 years after Operation Kikusui No. 6.

In his last letter, Ensign Kiyoshi Ogawa wrote to his parents:

Dear Father and Mother,

It has been decided that I also will make a sortie as a proud Special Attack Corps member. Looking back, when I think of your raising me in your arms for more than twenty years, I am filled with a sense of gratitude. I truly believe that no one else has lived a happier life than me, and I am resolved to repay the Emperor and my Father for your kindness.

Beyond those boundless white clouds, I will make my attack with a calm feeling. Not even thoughts of life and death will come to mind. A person dies once. It will be an honorable day to live for an eternal cause.

Father and Mother, please be glad for me.

Above all, Mother, please take care of your health, and I wish for everyone's prosperity. As I will be at Yasukuni Shrine, Father and Mother, I always and forever will be living near you and will be praying for your happiness.

I will go smiling, both on the day of my sortie and forever.
