= Buenos Aires-class destroyer =

Type of Argentinian naval vessel

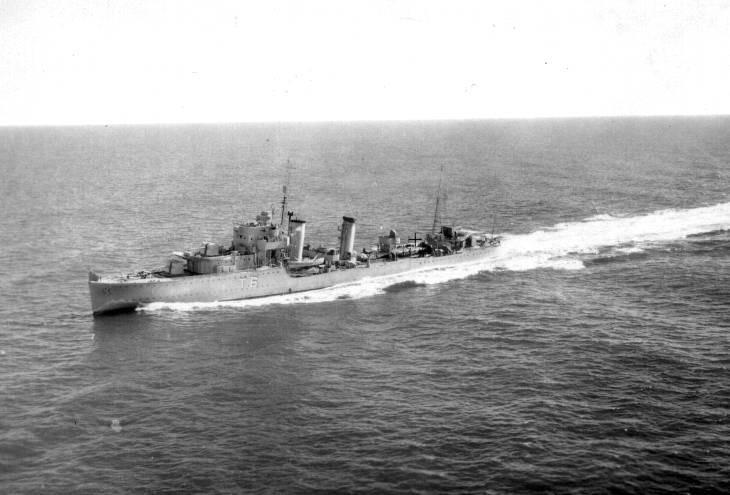
- ARA Buenos Aires

Class overview
- Name: Buenos Aires class
- Builders: Vickers Armstrong, John Brown, Cammell Laird, UK
- Operators: Argentine Navy
- Preceded by: Mendoza class
- Succeeded by: Brown class
- Built: 1936–1938
- In commission: 1938–73
- Completed: 7
- Lost: 1
- Retired: 6

General characteristics
- Type: Destroyer
- Displacement: 1,375 t (1,353 long tons) standard; 2,042 t (2,010 long tons) full load
- Length: 98.45 m (323 ft 0 in)
- Beam: 10.38 m (34 ft 1 in)
- Draught: 3.2 m (10 ft 6 in)
- Propulsion: 2 shaft geared Parsons steam turbines, three Admiralty boilers, 25,000 kW (34,000 hp)
- Speed: 35 knots (65 km/h; 40 mph)
- Range: 4,100 nmi (7,600 km) at 14 kn (26 km/h; 16 mph)
- Complement: 130
- Armament: 4 × 4.7 in (120 mm) QF Mark IX guns (4 × 1); 8 × 0.50 in (12.7 mm) machine guns; 8 × 533 mm (21 in) torpedo tubes (2 × 4)

The Buenos Aires-class destroyers were a group of destroyers built for the Argentine Navy in Britain in the 1930s.

== Design ==
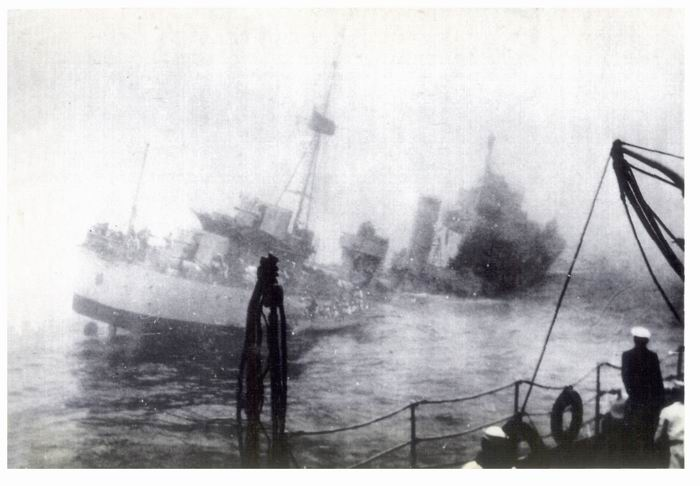
ARA Corrientes sinking off Mar del Plata after collision with cruiser Almirante Brown on 3 October 1941

The ships were based on the contemporary G-class destroyers building for the British Royal Navy, with some modifications to suit Argentine requirements.

After World War II these ships were modified by installing two single hand-worked 40 mm (1.6 in) Bofors guns between the funnels replacing the original anti-aircraft machine guns, and two twin air-cooled Bofors unique to the Argentine and Swedish navies (instead of the more common water-cooled mounts) replacing the after bank of torpedo tubes. Radar and sonar were also fitted at this time and Santa Cruz landed the "B" gun in favor of a pair of Hedgehog anti-submarine weapons. Anti-submarine weaponry was further improved with 4 throwers and 2 stern tracks.

== Ships ==
Ship	Builder	Launched	Commissioned	Fate
ARA Buenos Aires (T6 / D6)	Vickers-Armstrong, Barrow	21 September 1937	4 April 1938	Scrapped 1971
ARA Corrientes (T8)	Vickers-Armstrong, Barrow	21 September 1937	1 July 1938	Sunk in collision with cruiser ARA Almirante Brown, 3 October 1941
ARA Entre Rios (T7 / D7)	Vickers-Armstrong, Barrow	21 September 1937	15 May 1938	Scrapped 1973
ARA Misiones (T11 / D11)	Cammell Laird, Birkenhead	23 September 1937	5 September 1938	Scrapped 1971
ARA San Juan (T9 / D9)	John Brown & Company, Clydebank	24 June 1937	23 March 1938	Scrapped 1973
ARA San Luis (T10 / D10)	John Brown & Company, Clydebank	23 August 1937	23 March 1938	Scrapped 1971
ARA Santa Cruz (T12 / D12)	Cammell Laird	3 November 1937	26 September 1938	Scrapped 1973

== Operational history ==
ARA Corrientes collided with the heavy cruiser ARA Almirante Brown in the fog during naval exercises and sank on 3 October 1941, 54 nm northeast of Mar del Plata.

On 19 September 1955, Buenos Aires, San Luis, San Juan and Entre Rios supported the cruiser ARA Nueve de Julio when the latter shelled and destroyed fuel depots at the port of Mar del Plata, in the course of the Revolucion Libertadora. The destroyers' fire kept at bay a group of armed civilians and soldiers attempting to storm the local naval base. Some civilian property was damaged. The destroyer force also shelled the headquarters of the Army Antiaircraft School, north of the city, some hours later.

== See also ==
- List of ships of the Argentine Navy
- Mendoza-class destroyer
