= USS Stembel =

Fletcher-class destroyer

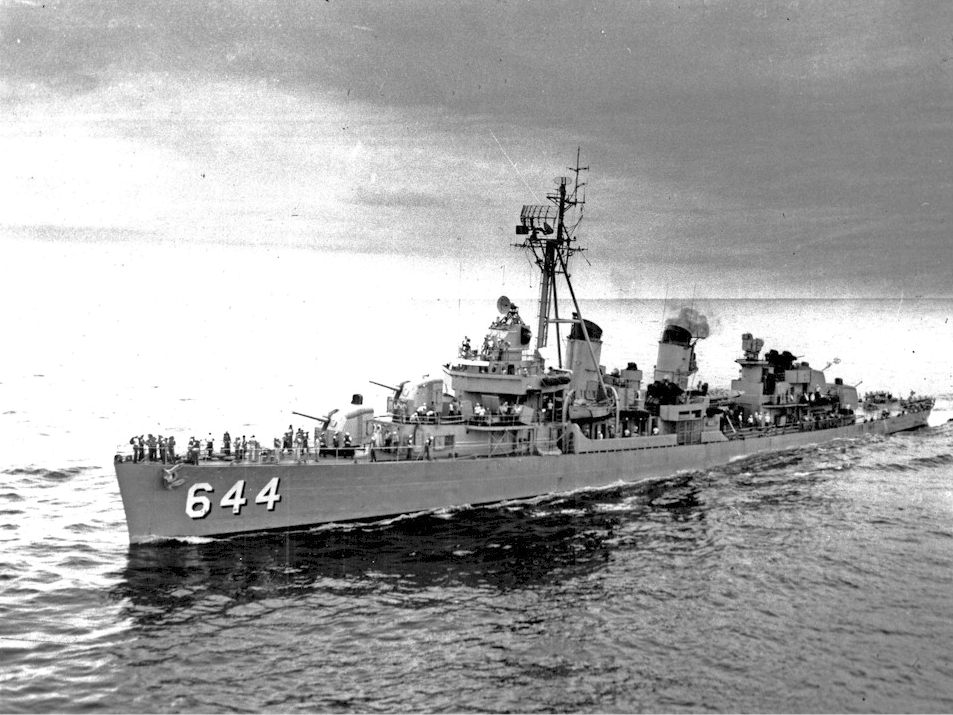

History

United States
- Namesake: Roger N. Stembel
- Builder: Bath Iron Works
- Laid down: 21 December 1942
- Launched: 8 May 1943
- Commissioned: 16 July 1943
- Decommissioned: 27 May 1958
- Stricken: 1 September 1975
- Fate: Loaned to Argentina, 7 August 1961

History

Argentina
- Name: ARA Rosales (D-22)
- Namesake: Leonardo Rosales
- Acquired: 7 August 1961
- Stricken: 1982
- Fate: Scrapped 1982

General characteristics
- Class & type: Fletcher-class destroyer
- Displacement: 2,050 tons
- Length: 376 ft 6 in (114.7 m)
- Beam: 39 ft 8 in (12.1 m)
- Draft: 17 ft 9 in (5.4 m)
- Propulsion: 60,000 shp (45 MW); 2 propellers
- Speed: 35 knots (65 km/h; 40 mph)
- Range: 6500 nmi. (12,000 km); at 15 kt
- Complement: 329
- Armament: 5 × 5 in (130 mm), 4 × 40 mm AA guns, 4 × 20 mm AA guns, 10 × 21 inch (533 mm) torpedo tubes, 6 × depth charge projectors, 2 × depth charge tracks

USS Stembel (DD-644) was a Fletcher-class destroyer in service with the United States Navy from 1942 to 1947 and from 1951 to 1958. In 1961, she was transferred to Argentina where she served as ARA Rosales (D-22). She was scrapped in 1982.

== History ==
=== United States Navy (1943-1961) ===
USS Stembel (DD-644) was named for Rear Admiral Roger N. Stembel (1810–1900), who served in the Civil War. She was laid down on 21 December 1942 by the Bath Iron Works, Bath, Maine; launched on 8 May 1943; sponsored by Miss Mary G. Helfenstein; and commissioned on 16 July 1943.

==== World War II ====
Stembel conducted sea trials in the Casco Bay area and held her shakedown cruise in Bermuda waters from 11 August to 25 August. After a post-shakedown overhaul, she got underway on 2 October for San Juan, Puerto Rico, via Norfolk. Upon her arrival, she was assigned to a group of warships which sailed for Morocco on the 8th and arrived at Casablanca on 15 October. Three days later, she began a long journey to Hawaii, via Trinidad, the Panama Canal Zone, and San Diego.

The destroyer arrived at Pearl Harbor on 11 November and was overhauled during December 1943. On 16 January 1944, she sortied with the Fast Carrier Task Force (then called TF 58, while it was part of 5th Fleet; at other times it was 3rd Fleet's TF 38) to support air strikes against the Marshall Islands which began on 29 January. On 17 February and 18 February, the carriers launched raids against Truk, the powerful Japanese base in the Caroline Islands, before the task force returned to Pearl Harbor. On 10 March, Stembel headed for the South Pacific. She joined a convoy of tank landing ships (LSTs) in the Solomon Islands and escorted it to Aitape, New Guinea. She bombarded the landing area there prior to the landing on 22 April and then supported the troops ashore until 25 April. The destroyer escorted empty LSTs to Cape Sudest and returned to Aitape with a resupply convoy.

In May, Stembel was attached to the 5th Fleet and designated flagship of LST Flotilla 16 for the invasion of Guam. The flotilla sortied from Eniwetok on 15 July and was standing off the Asan Beaches on the morning of 21 July. Stembel bombarded the shore until the assault waves headed for the beach, and then she acted as the communication and traffic control center for landing ships. She remained off Asan until 1 August when she sailed for Hawaii.

Stembel arrived at Pearl Harbor on 11 August for tender availability and amphibious training exercises. She sortied with Task Group 33.7 (TG 33.7) (Tractor Group "Able") for Manus via Eniwetok. The task group arrived at Seeadler Harbor on 4 October to make final preparations for the invasion of the Philippine Islands. It sortied on 11 October and entered Leyte Gulf on 19 October. The next morning, Stembel was 4,000 yards off the beaches at Dulag, Leyte, protecting the landing ships and smaller craft against aircraft and submarines. She sailed on 25 October for New Guinea, screening empty transports, and returned to Leyte with a resupply convoy on 18 November. Stembel next proceeded to Manus, joined the escort carrier group of TF 77, and sailed for the Palau Islands. On 10 December, she sortied with TG 77.12 for the western Philippines, entering the Sulu Sea on 13 December. Stembel provided antiaircraft and fire support for the assault on Mindoro until sailing for Leyte Gulf on 26 December 1944.

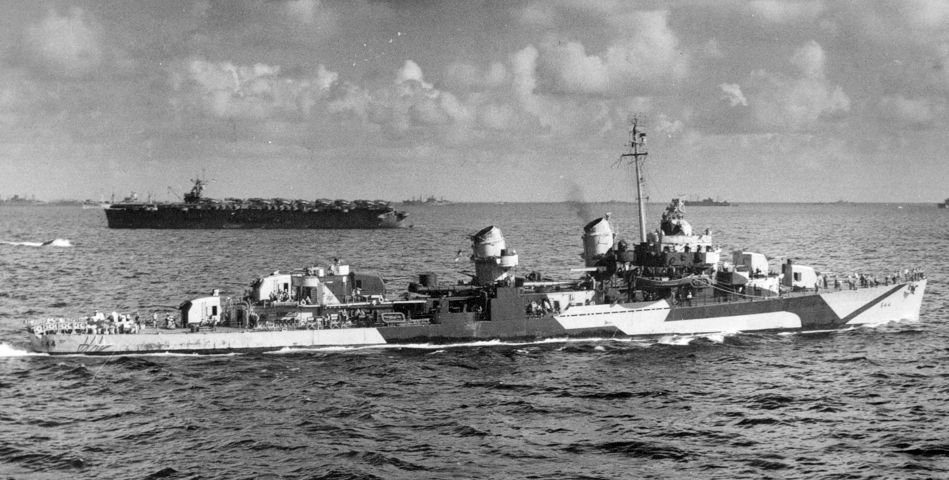
USS Stembel (DD-644) during World War II.

Stembel stood out of San Pedro Bay on 4 January 1945 in the Lingayen Attack Force. The next day, she was ordered to join the escort carrier group. On the 8th, the group was attacked by Japanese kamikaze planes and Kitkun Bay (CVE-71) was holed at the waterline. The destroyer went alongside and removed over 360 men from the disabled carrier. The men were returned to Kitkun Bay the next day as she was proceeding under her own steam, and Stembel began patrolling the entrance to Lingayen Gulf. On 11 January she and four other destroyers were ordered to destroy enemy shipping in San Fernando Harbor. After sinking a 50-foot tugger, an inter-island oiler, and damaging a cargo ship, she withdrew to bombard the town of Rosario the next day.

Stembel sailed for San Pedro on 21 January and thence proceeded to Ulithi. She sortied from there on 10 February in the screen of the Amphibious Support Force for the invasion of the Volcano Islands. After staging off Saipan, the DD arrived off Iwo Jima on 16 February where she screened minesweepers, conducted night harassment fire, bombarded the beaches for the troops as they landed, and then supported them with call fire until 7 March. After making voyage repairs at Ulithi Stembel joined the fast carriers and sortied, on 14 March, for an area east of Kyūshū. Air strikes were flown against that island on 18 March; and, on 19 March, against Kyūshū airfields as well as against shipping at Kure and Kobe, Honshū. Stembel rescued two men from a downed plane from Wasp (CV-18) on 18 March and splashed an enemy aircraft the next day.

Stembel saved a pilot from Hancock (CV-19) on 26 March and another three days later. Her task group was operating between 60 and 100 miles (100–160 km) east of Okinawa as they launched pre-invasion air strikes against that chain of islands. The ship was forced to return to Ulithi on 11 April for repairs and then rejoined the fast carriers southeast of Okinawa on 21 April. Bunker Hill (CV-17) was hit and severely damaged on the morning of 11 May, and Stembel moved close aboard to aid in extinguishing the carrier's fires. She sailed for San Pedro, P.I., via Guam, for a tender overhaul on 27 May.

Stembel sortied from San Pedro on 1 July with TF 38 and operated with the fast carriers in Japanese home waters until 1 September. The destroyer and other fleet surface ships bombarded Kamaishi, Honshū, on 14 July and again on 9 August. On 29 and 30 July, they shelled targets at Hamamatsu, Honshū. On 1 September, the destroyer was detached from the fast carriers and sailed for the United States, arriving at Port Angeles, Wash., on 13 September. She was given a preinactivation overhaul at Puget Sound Naval Shipyard in November and then steamed down the coast to San Diego. She was decommissioned on 31 May 1946 and attached to the Pacific Reserve Fleet.

==== Cold War ====
Stembel joined the active fleet again on 9 November 1951. After refitting, sea trials, and a shakedown cruise, the destroyer stood out of San Diego on 21 June 1952 en route to the Korean War Zone. From 26 July to 2 November, Stembel served with carrier TF 77 in support of United Nations Forces. She served as plane guard for Boxer (CVA-21), assisted Iowa (BB-61) in bombarding Kojo and Wonsan, and patrolled the Taiwan Strait. She returned to San Diego on 5 January 1953, and remained on the west coast until 16 May when she again deployed to Korean waters where she served until 8 December.

Stembel deployed to the western Pacific from 17 June to 24 October 1954, 17 May to 15 November 1955, 9 July to 19 December 1956, and from 8 July to 22 December 1957. On 3 February 1958, the ship reported to Long Beach for inactivation. She was decommissioned on 27 May 1958 and assigned to the Pacific Reserve Fleet. Stembel was stricken from the US Naval Vessel Register on 1 September 1975.

Contrary to what has appeared here before, the Stembel was not used in the 1959 Jerry Lewis film, Don't Give Up The Ship. The film ship was USS Vammen (DE-644).

=== Argentine Navy (1961-1982) ===
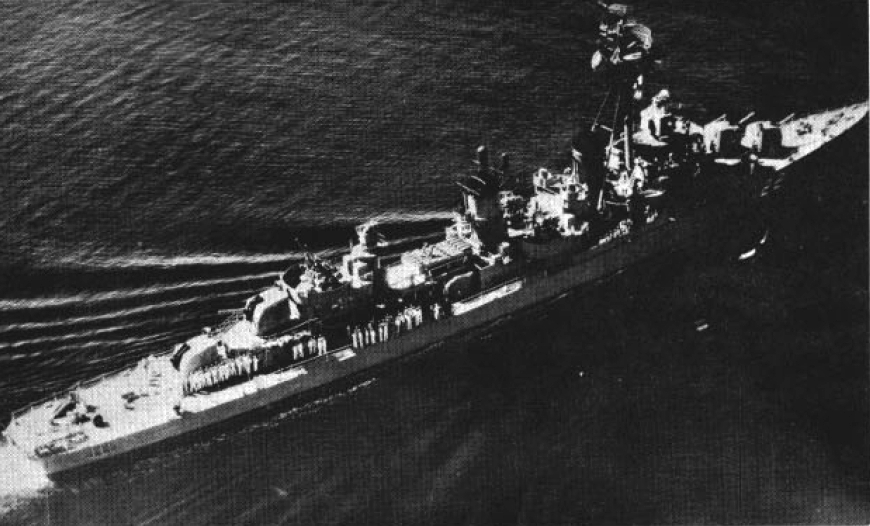
Stembel as ARA Rosales (D-22) in 1962.

Stembel was loaned to the Republic of Argentina on 7 August 1961 under the Military Assistance Program and served the Argentine Navy as ARA Rosales (D-22). Rosales was stricken and broken up for scrap in 1982.

== Awards ==
Stembel received nine battle stars for World War II service and three for service during the Korean War.

Asiatic Pacific Campaign Medal with nine battle star

29 Jan 44 - 8 Feb 44 P26-2; Occupation of Kwajalein and Majuro Atolls

16 Feb 44 - 17 Feb 44 P27-1; Truk attack

21 Apr 44 - 25 Apr 44 P40; Hollandia operation (Aitape Humbolt Bay-Tanahmerah Bay)

21 Jul 44- 1 Aug 44 P29-7; Capture and occupation of Guam

20 Oct 44 P31-1; Leyte landings

18 Nov 44 P31-1; Leyte landings

9 Jan 45 P32-2; Lingayen Gulf landing

16 Feb 45 - 7 Mar 45 P33-1; Assault and occupation of Iwo Jima

17 Mar 45 - 2 Jun 45 P34-2; 5th and 3d Fleet raids in support of Okinawa Gunto operation

10 Jul 45 - 15 Aug 45 P35 3d Fleet operations against Japan 5

China Service Medal 19-24 Jul 52

Navy Occupation with asia Clasp 2-3 Sep 45
