= ARA Buenos Aires (D-6) =

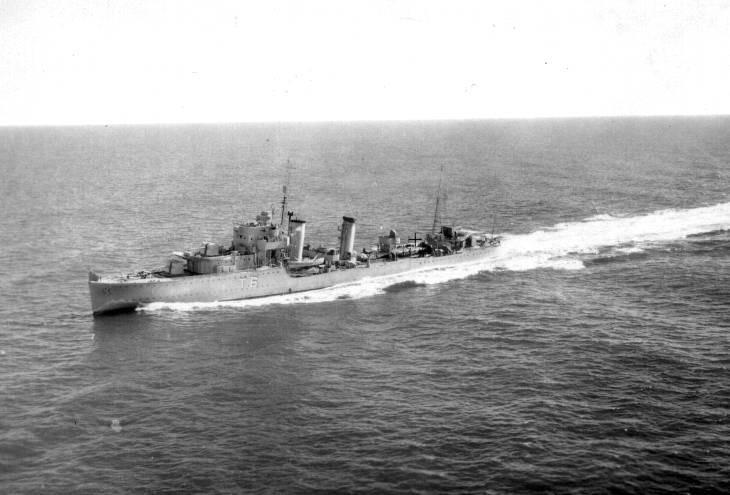
- ARA Buenos Aires

History

Argentina
- Name: Buenos Aires
- Namesake: Buenos Aires province
- Builder: Vickers-Armstrong, Barrow
- Launched: 21 September 1937
- Completed: 4 April 1938
- Stricken: 1971
- Fate: Scrapped, 1971

General characteristics
- Class & type: Buenos Aires-class destroyer
- Displacement: 1,375 t (1,353 long tons) standard; 2,042 t (2,010 long tons) full load
- Length: 98.45 m (323 ft 0 in)
- Beam: 10.38 m (34 ft 1 in)
- Draught: 3.2 m (10 ft 6 in)
- Propulsion: 2 shaft geared steam turbines, three boilers, 34,000 hp (25 MW)
- Speed: 35 knots (65 km/h; 40 mph)
- Range: 4,100 nmi (7,600 km) at 14 kn (26 km/h; 16 mph)
- Complement: 130
- Armament: 4 × 4.7 in (120 mm) QF Mark IX guns (4 × 1); 8 × 0.50 in (12.7 mm) machine guns; 8 × 533 mm (21 in) torpedo tubes (2 × 4)

ARA Buenos Aires was the lead ship of her class of destroyer built for the Argentine Navy, in service from 1938 until 1971.

== Design ==
The ship's design was based on the British Royal Navy's G class destroyer.

The Argentine Navy initially classified it as a "torpedo boat" ((in Spanish) torpedero), and in the 1950s as a "destroyer".

== History ==
Buenos Aires was laid down at the Vickers-Armstrong shipyard in Barrow-in-Furness, England, as part of a British-built destroyer program for the Argentine Navy. She was launched on 21 September 1937 and completed on 4 April 1938, when she was formally transferred to Argentina. The vessel was the lead ship of the Buenos Aires-class destroyers, a class based on the Royal Navy’s contemporary G-class destroyers, adapted to Argentine naval requirements.

Upon entering service in 1938, Buenos Aires joined the 1st Torpedo Squadron of the Argentine Navy. Initially classified as a torpedo boat (torpedero), she was later redesignated as a destroyer during postwar naval reorganization. During her career, the ship participated in fleet exercises, training operations, and patrol duties in Argentine waters. In the 1950s, she underwent modernization work that included the installation of improved anti-aircraft weaponry, radar, and sonar equipment.

The ship was the fifteenth vessel in Argentine naval history to bear the name Buenos Aires, honoring the province and city of Buenos Aires. After more than three decades of service, she was stricken from the naval register in 1971 and subsequently scrapped.

== See also ==
- List of ships of the Argentine Navy
