= Seizō Yasunori =

Japanese kamikaze pilot (1924–1945)

- 安則 盛三
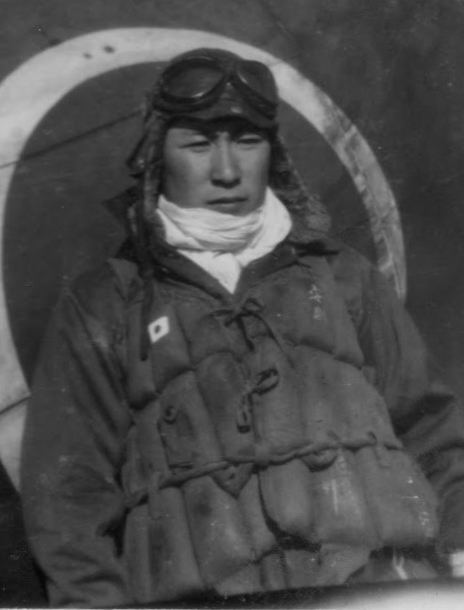
- Yasunori in 1945
- Born: March 28, 1924; Akō, Hyōgo Prefecture
- Died: May 11, 1945 (aged 21); USS Bunker Hill, near Okinawa, Ryukyu Islands
- Military career
- Allegiance: Empire of Japan
- Branch: Imperial Japanese Navy
- Rank: Lieutenant Junior Grade
- Conflicts: World War II; Battle of Okinawa †

Sub Lieutenant Seizō Yasunori (安則 盛三, Yasunori Seizō; March 28, 1924 – May 11, 1945) was a Japanese student who joined the Imperial Japanese Navy. On May 11, 1945, he flew a kamikaze suicide mission against USS Bunker Hill during the Battle of Okinawa near the end of World War II.

== Early life ==
Yasunori was born on a farm outside of Akō, Hyōgo Prefecture.

== Military career and death ==
Kamikaze pilots were generally 16–20 years old, poorly trained, and flew poorly maintained aircraft. As leader of the Navy's Kamikaze Corps 7th Showa Special Attack Squadron, he led a group of four young men to attack US Navy ships. Yasunori led a group of six planes which departed Kanoya Air Base between 0640 and 0653 on May 11, 1945. Yasunori dropped a 250-kilogram (551 lb) bomb and then crashed his A6M Zero into the aft portion of the flight deck of the USS Bunker Hill. The bomb tore a hole in the port side of the ship and his plane crashed onto the flight deck. The ensuing explosion destroyed many of the planes on the deck. His plane dragged another plane overboard. His wingman, Kiyoshi Ogawa, crashed into the ship a few seconds later. A third plane crashed into the sea before reaching the ship. The fate of the remaining three planes is unknown. He and his wingman killed 393 Americans and wounded an additional 264. It was the most devastating suicide attack in the Pacific War. Three hundred fifty-two of the dead were buried at sea the next day.
