= USS Bunker Hill (CV-17) =

Essex-class aircraft carrier of the US Navy

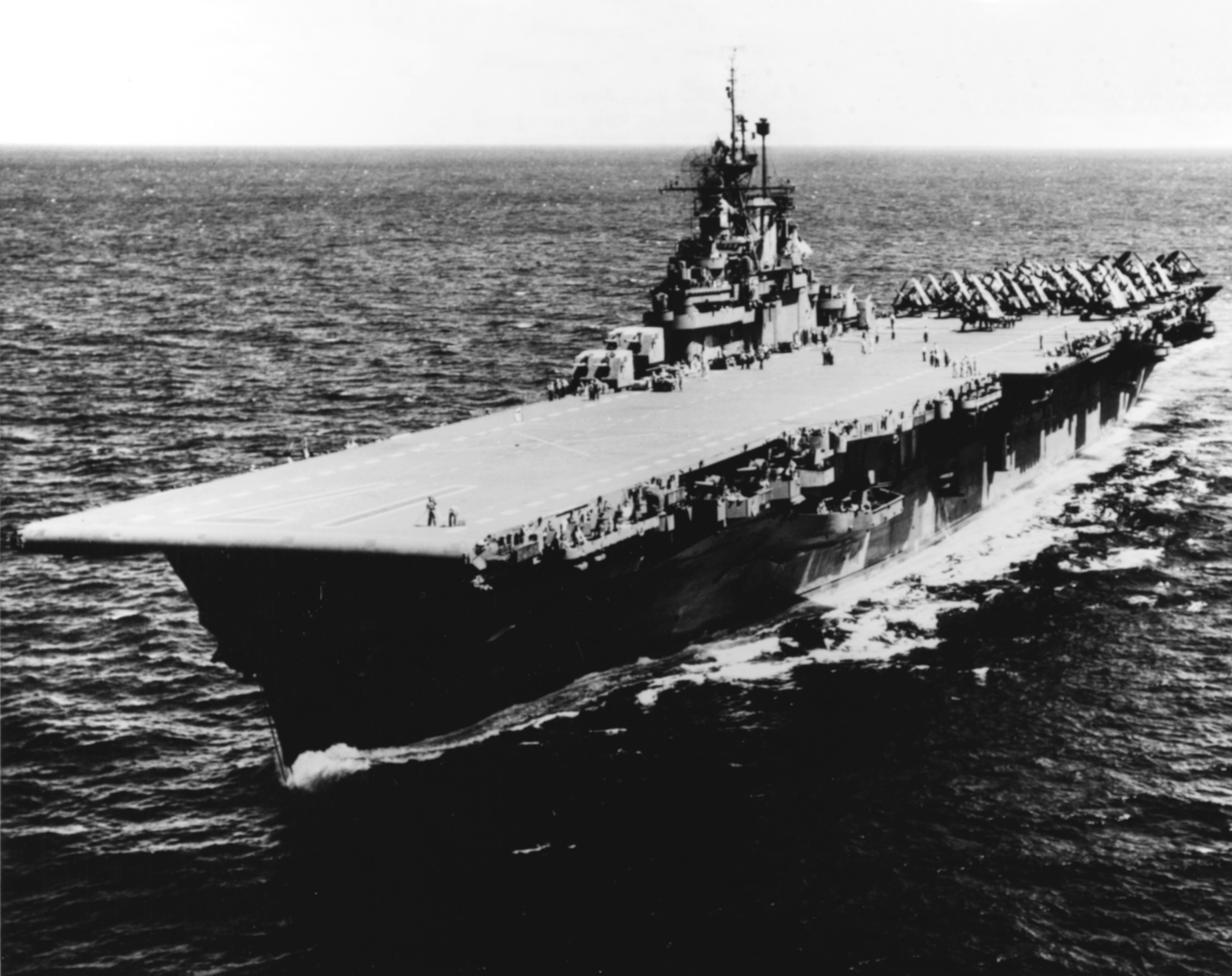
- USS Bunker Hill at sea in 1945

History

United States
- Name: Bunker Hill
- Namesake: Battle of Bunker Hill
- Builder: Fore River Shipyard
- Laid down: 15 September 1941
- Launched: 7 December 1942
- Commissioned: 25 May 1943
- Decommissioned: 9 January 1947
- Reclassified: CVA-17, 1 October 1952; CVS-17, 8 August 1953; AVT-9, May 1959
- Stricken: 2 November 1966
- Fate: Scrapped, 1973
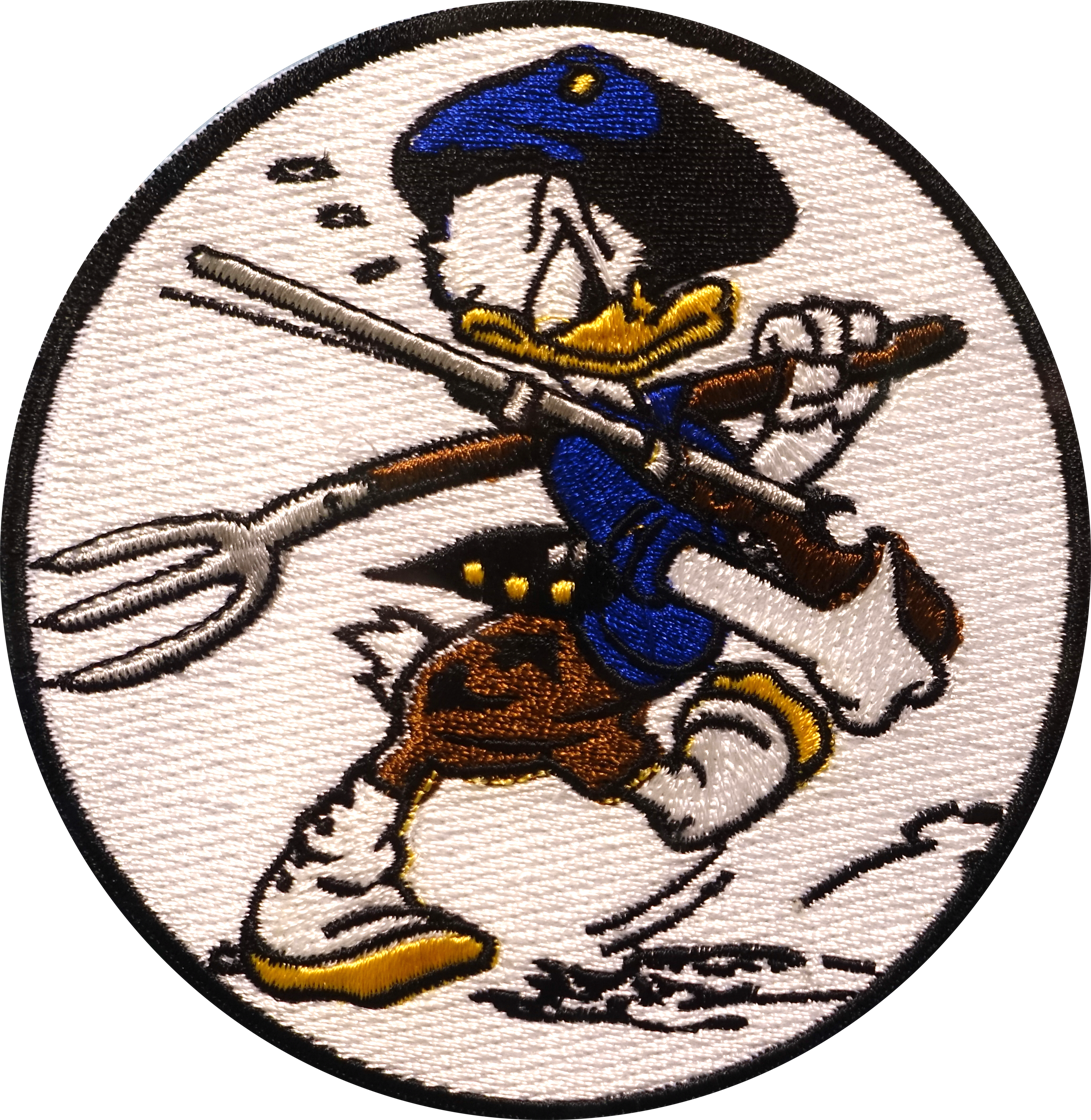
- Badge

General characteristics
- Class & type: Essex-class aircraft carrier
- Displacement: 27,100 long tons (27,500 t) (standard); 36,380 long tons (36,960 t) (full load)
- Length: 820 feet (249.9 m) (wl); 872 feet (265.8 m) (o/a)
- Beam: 93 ft (28.3 m)
- Draft: 34 ft 2 in (10.41 m)
- Installed power: 8 × Babcock & Wilcox boilers; 150,000 shp (110,000 kW)
- Propulsion: 4 × geared steam turbines; 4 × screw propellers
- Speed: 33 knots (61 km/h; 38 mph)
- Range: 14,100 nmi (26,100 km; 16,200 mi) at 20 knots (37 km/h; 23 mph)
- Complement: 2,600 officers and enlisted men
- Armament: 12 × 5 in (127 mm) DP guns; 32 × 40 mm (1.6 in) AA guns; 46 × 20 mm (0.8 in) AA guns
- Armor: Waterline belt: 2.5–4 in (64–102 mm); Deck: 1.5 in (38 mm); Hangar deck: 2.5 in (64 mm); Bulkheads: 4 in (102 mm)
- Aircraft carried: 36 × Grumman F4F Wildcat; 36 × Douglas SBD Dauntless; 18 × Grumman TBF Avenger

USS Bunker Hill (CV/CVA/CVS-17, AVT-9) was one of 24 Essex-class aircraft carriers built during World War II for the United States Navy. Commissioned in May 1943, Bunker Hill was the first U.S. Navy ship to have been named for the 1775 Battle of Bunker Hill, and received the Presidential Unit Citation in recognition of her distinguished service throughout the Pacific Theater.

From late 1943 through 1945, Bunker Hill took part in major operations including the Gilbert and Marshall Islands campaigns, the raid on Truk, the capture of the Mariana and Palau Islands, the Battle of the Philippine Sea, the air raids on Formosa and Japanese home islands, and the battles of Iwo Jima and Okinawa during the final drive toward the Japanese mainland.

On 11 May 1945, while conducting operations in support of the Okinawa campaign, Bunker Hill was struck by two kamikazes in quick succession setting the vessel on fire. Casualties exceeded 600, including 396 killed or missing, with 264 wounded. These were the second heaviest personnel losses suffered by any carrier to survive the war, after Franklin. After the attack, Bunker Hill returned to the U.S. mainland and was under repair when hostilities ended.

After the war, Bunker Hill was employed as a troop transport bringing American service members back from the Pacific, and was decommissioned in 1947. While in reserve the vessel was reclassified as an attack carrier (CVA), then an antisubmarine carrier (CVS), and finally an Auxiliary Aircraft Landing Training Ship (AVT), but was never modernized and never saw active service again. Bunker Hill and Franklin were the only Essex-class ships never recommissioned after World War II.

Stricken from the Naval Vessel Register in 1966, Bunker Hill served as an electronics test platform for many years in San Diego Bay. An effort to save her as a museum ship in 1972 was unsuccessful and she was sold for scrap in 1973.

== Construction and commissioning ==
Bunker Hill was laid down on 15 September 1941, as hull number 1509 at the Bethlehem Steel Company's Fore River Shipyard, Quincy, Massachusetts, and launched on 7 December 1942, sponsored by Mrs. Donald Boynton. The carrier was commissioned on 25 May 1943, with Captain J. J. Ballentine in command. The carrier took aboard her air group at Norfolk, Virginia, at the end of June, and on 15 July sailed south to Trinidad on her shakedown cruise. Three weeks later the ship returned to Norfolk, and on 4 September sailed south to the Panama Canal on the way to San Diego, Pearl Harbor, and the Pacific Theater.

== Service history during World War II ==
=== 1943–1944 ===
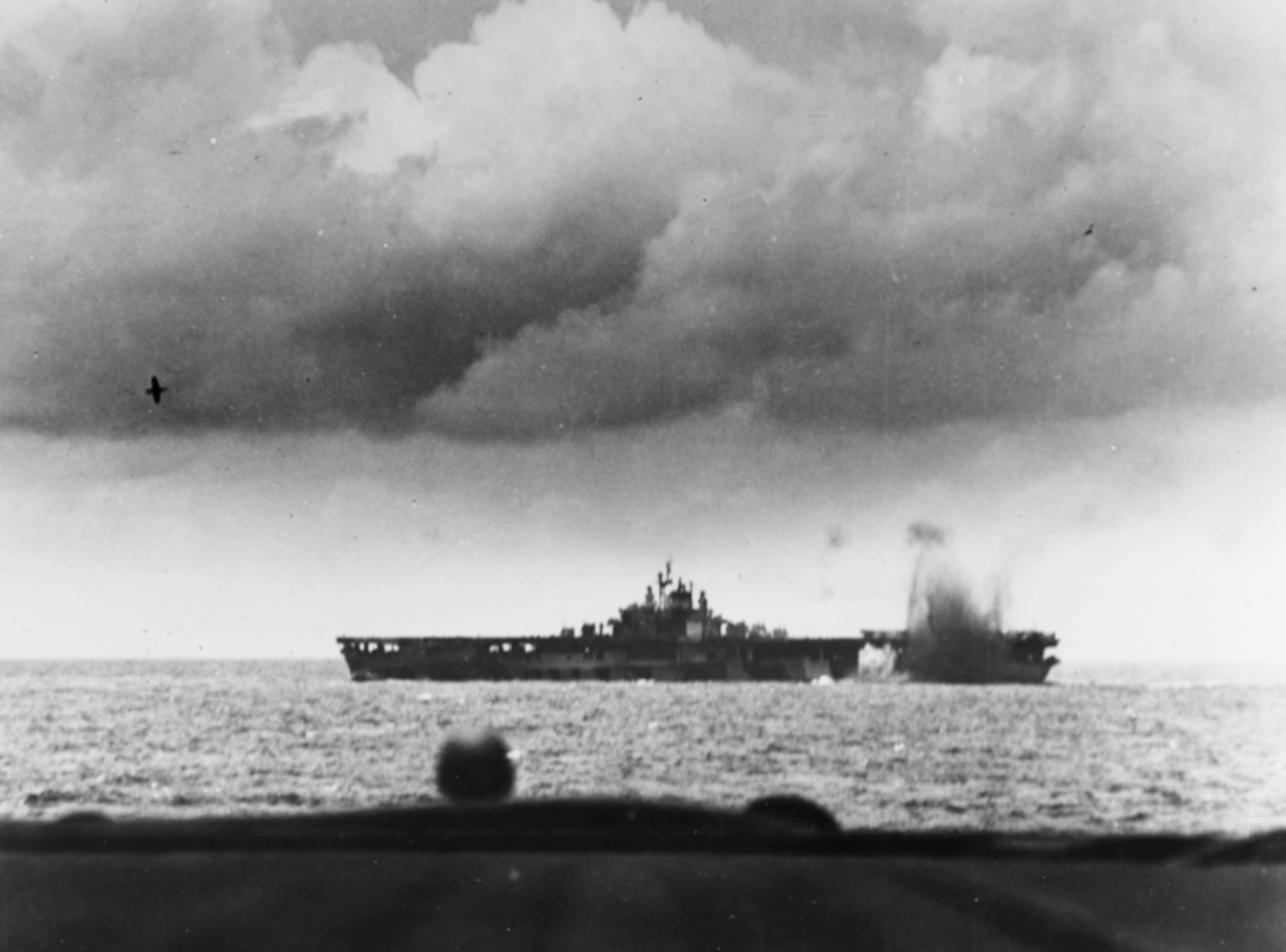
Bunker Hill under attack, 19 June 1944

Bunker Hill had worked up with VF-17, a new fighter squadron flying F4U Corsairs. The Corsair, a new airplane, had some difficulties in its development, and the Navy gave consideration to replacing VF-17's Corsairs with Grumman F6F Hellcats. The squadron argued for retention of its Corsairs, as they felt they were better combat aircraft. Bunker Hill had departed for the combat theater with VF-17 and its Corsairs aboard. While en route from San Diego to Pearl Harbor, the pilots found that the Navy had decided not to use Corsairs aboard carriers, to avoid carrying parts and supplies for two fighters (the Corsair and the Hellcat) and with the challenges the U.S. Navy was having in getting Corsairs approved for carrier use. (The Fleet Air Arm of the Royal Navy developed an appropriate landing technique for its shipboard Corsairs by very early 1944, using a curving approach that kept the LSO (landing signal officer) in view while coming aboard, and this was adopted by the U.S. Navy by late 1944.) VF-17 was ordered to the Southwest Pacific, where it was land-based. It was replaced aboard Bunker Hill by VF-18, whose men and Hellcats had also been ferried aboard the carrier from San Diego to Pearl Harbor.

Bunker Hill departed Pearl Harbor on 19 October en route to the Southwest Pacific. The carrier's air group participated in the air raid on the Imperial Japanese Navy base at Rabaul, along with USS Essex and USS Independence on 11 November 1943. During the mission the carriers' fighters (VF-18) escorted bombers to Rabaul, and CV-17 was reunited with VF-17, then land-based at Ondonga Airfield in the Solomon Islands. The tailhooks were reinstalled on the squadron's Corsairs, enabling them to land and refuel on their former ship while providing air cover to the task force as its own planes were escorting the raid on Rabaul. On 14 November the carrier set a course for the Gilbert Islands to cover the invasion and occupation of Tarawa.

Bunker Hill went on to air raids on Kavieng in support of the amphibious landings in the Bismarck Archipelago (25 December 1943, 1 January, and 4 January 1944); air raids in the Marshall Islands (29 January – 8 February); the large-scale carrier air raids on Truk Atoll (17–18 February), during which eight Japanese warships were sunk; and air raids on the Marianas Islands (Guam, Saipan, and Tinian) (23 February). Bunker Hill returned to Hawaii (28 February – 4 March 1944), and completed voyage repairs and upkeep while in dry dock at Pearl Harbor Navy Yard (6–9 March). At this time, CAG-17 detached from the carrier, which subsequently took on the newly formed CVG-8, along with four night fighting Hellcats of VF(N)-76. During 15–20 March, Bunker Hill steamed for Majuro, Marshall Islands. At this point, CVG-8 reported 41 F6F-3s of VF-8, 32 SB2C-1Cs of VB-8, 22 TBF-1Cs of VT-8, and a flag F6F-3 on board, along with the four F6F-3Ns.

Subsequent combat operations included air raids on Palau, Yap, Ulithi, and Woleai in the Palau Islands (30 March – 1 April); raids in support of the U.S. Army landings around Hollandia (21–28 April); air raids on Truk, Satawan, and Ponape in the Caroline Islands (29 April – 1 May), and combat operations in the Marianas in support of the amphibious landings on Saipan and Guam (12 June – 10 August), including the titanic Battle of the Philippine Sea, just west of the Marianas. On 19 June 1944, during the opening phases of the landings in the Marianas, Bunker Hill was damaged when the explosion of a Japanese aerial bomb scattered shrapnel fragments across the decks and the sides of the aircraft carrier. Two sailors were killed, and about 80 more were wounded. Bunker Hill continued to fight, with her antiaircraft fire shooting down a few IJN aircraft. During the Battle of the Philippine Sea, about 476 Japanese aircraft were destroyed, nearly all of them shot down by Navy F6F Hellcats, such as those carried by Bunker Hill. During September, Bunker Hill carried out air raids in the western Caroline Islands, and then she and her task force steamed north to launch air raids on Luzon, Formosa, and Okinawa, through early November.

On 6 November 1944, Bunker Hill steamed eastward from the forward area, and went to the Bremerton Naval Shipyard, for major overhaul/upkeep work and weaponry upgrades. The carrier departed from the Port of Bremerton on 24 January 1945 and returned to the combat area in the Western Pacific. Stopping at Pearl Harbor on the way, the carrier took aboard Carrier Air Group 84, which included VF-84, a new squadron built around a nucleus of veterans of VF-17, the carrier's original squadron.

=== 1945 ===
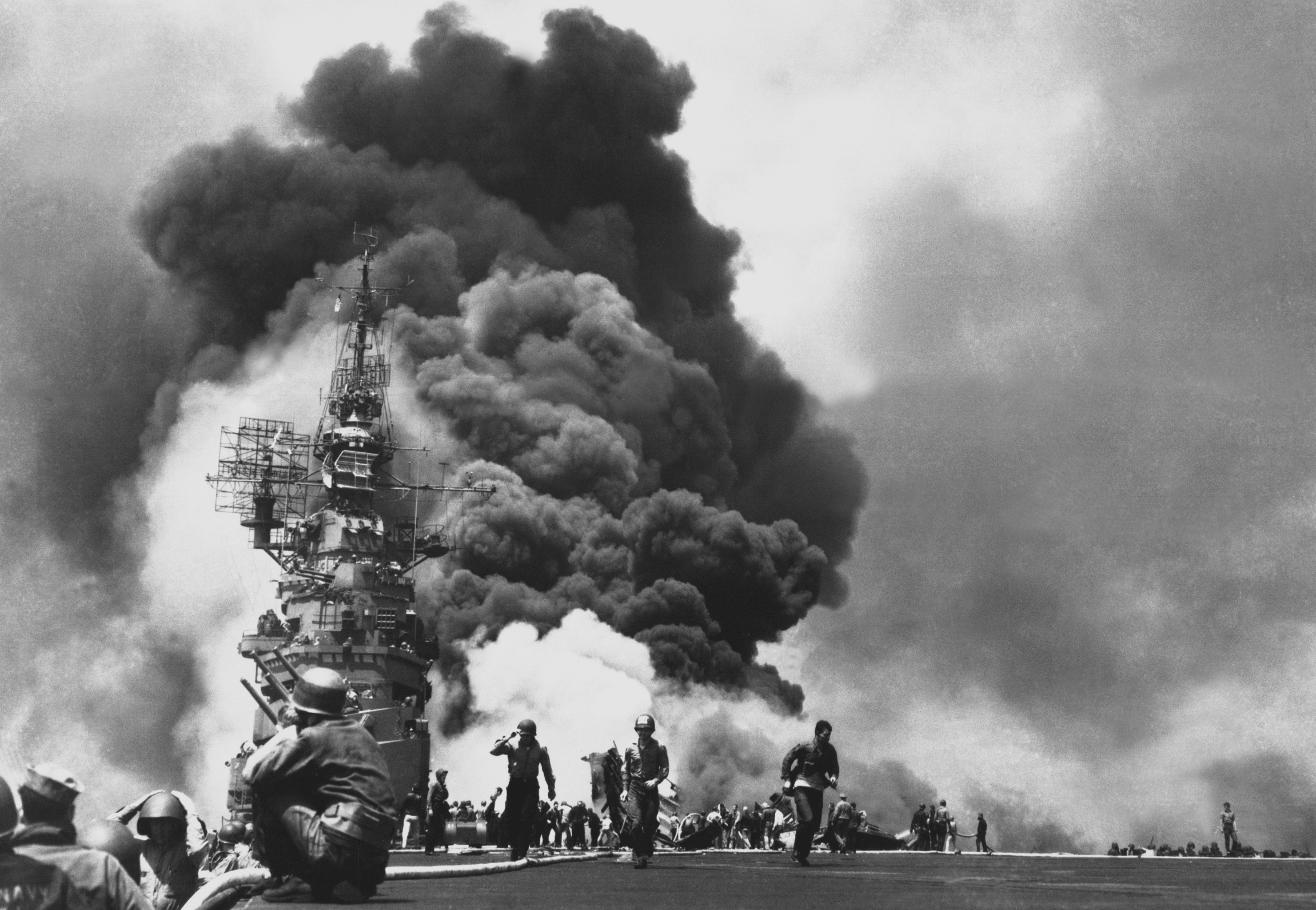
Bunker Hill's flight deck after the carrier was struck by two Kamikazes on 11 May 1945

In 1945, Bunker Hill was the flagship of Task Force 58, commanded by Vice-Admiral Marc A. Mitscher. Commodore Arleigh Burke was his chief of staff, and the admiral's staff all were accommodated aboard the carrier. In the task force's final drive across the central Pacific, Bunker Hill operated with the other fast carriers and their screening gunships in the Battle of Iwo Jima, the 5th Fleet raids against Honshū and the Nansei Shoto (15 February – 4 March), and the 5th Fleet's support of the Battle of Okinawa. On 7 April 1945, Bunker Hill's planes took part in an attack by the Fast Carrier Task Force of the Pacific Fleet on Imperial Japanese Navy forces in the East China Sea. The carrier's aircraft had located the Japanese battleship Yamato, the largest battleship in the world. In Operation Ten-Go the battleship, screened by one light cruiser and eight destroyers, steamed toward Okinawa to interfere with the Allied invasion of that island. The aircraft of the task force attacked and sank Yamato, the cruiser, and four of the destroyers.

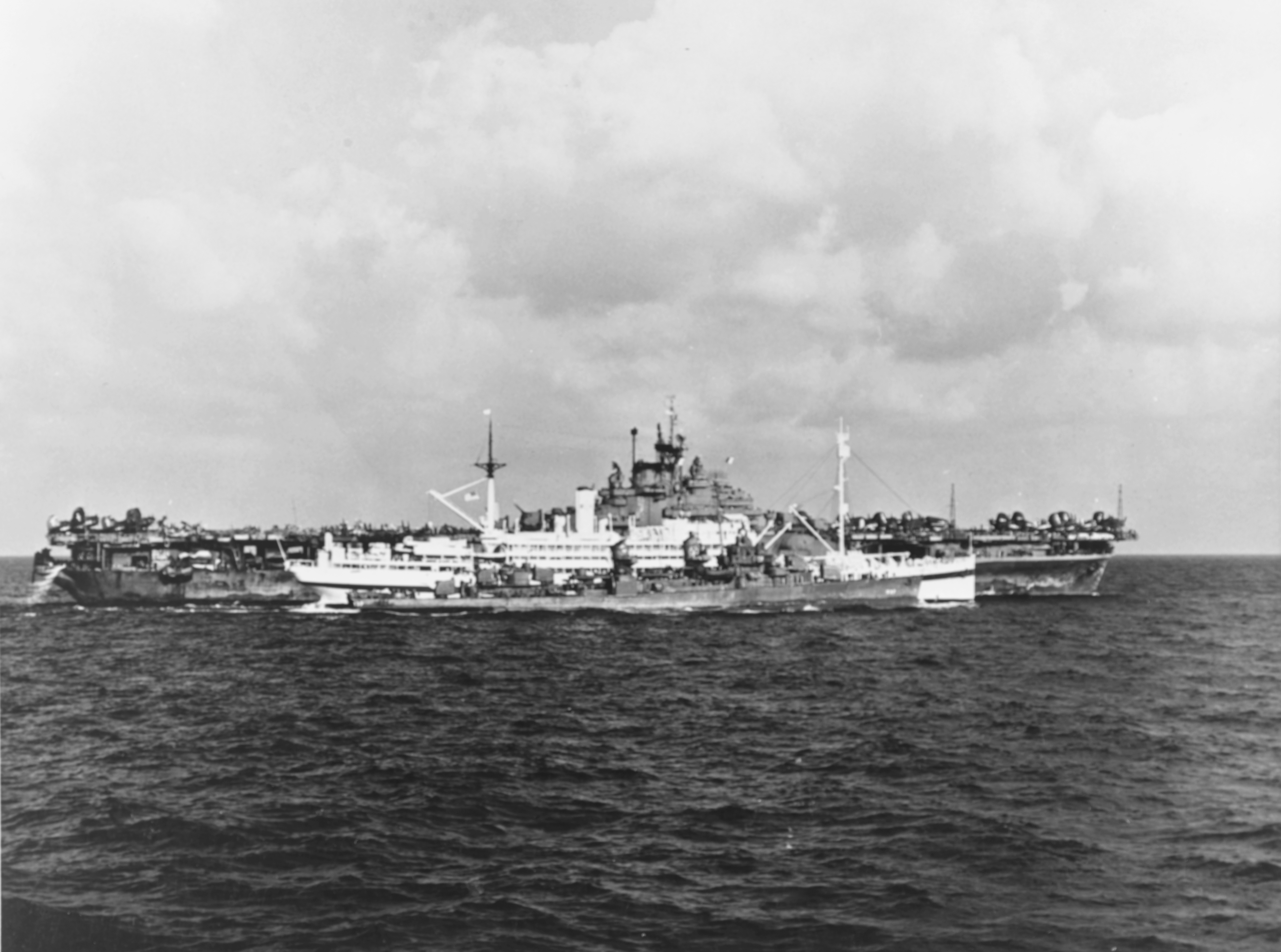
Bunker Hill transferring casualties to USS Bountiful after the kamikaze attacks, 12 May 1945

On the morning of 11 May 1945, while supporting the invasion of Okinawa, Bunker Hill was struck and severely damaged by two Japanese kamikaze planes. A Mitsubishi A6M Zero fighter plane piloted by Lieutenant Junior Grade Seizō Yasunori emerged from low cloud cover, dove toward the flight deck on the starboard quarter and dropped a 550-pound (250 kilogram) bomb that penetrated the flight deck and exited from the side of the ship at gallery deck level before exploding in the ocean. The Zero then crashed onto the carrier's flight deck, destroying parked aircraft full of fuel and ammunition, causing a large fire. The remains of the Zero went over the deck and dropped into the sea. Then 30 seconds later, a second Zero, piloted by Ensign Kiyoshi Ogawa, plunged into its suicide dive despite facing antiaircraft fire, dropped a 550-pound bomb, and then hit the flight deck near the carrier's "island", as kamikazes were trained to aim for the island superstructure. The bomb carried by the second kamikaze penetrated to the pilots' ready room, where 22 members of VF-84 lost their lives. Gasoline fires flamed up and several explosions took place. The two kamikaze killed 396 sailors and airmen, including 43 missing and never found, and wounded 264. Among the casualties were three officers and eleven enlisted men from Mitscher's staff. Mitscher's flag cabin was also destroyed, along with all of his uniforms, personal papers, and possessions. The admiral relinquished command by visual signal; he and his remaining staff were transferred by breeches buoy to destroyer English and then to the aircraft carrier Enterprise, which became the flagship. Despite the damage, Bunker Hill was able to steam at 20 knots to Ulithi, where the Marine pilots of VMF-221, who had been aloft during the kamikaze attack and were diverted to other carriers, rejoined their ship. The carrier returned home by way of Pearl Harbor, and was sent to the Bremerton Naval Shipyard for repairs. She was still in the shipyard when the war ended in mid-August 1945.

== Post-war ==
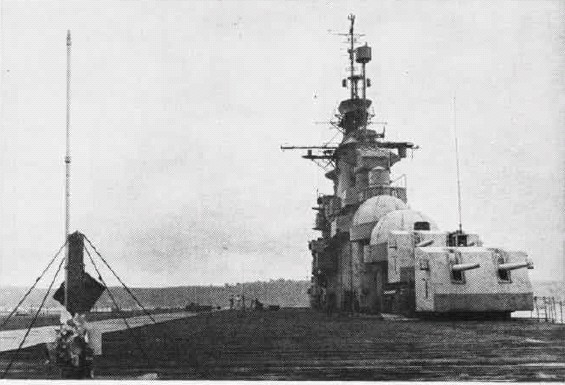
Bunker Hill as a stationary electronics test platform, 1967

On 27 September 1945, Bunker Hill sailed from Bremerton to report for duty with the Operation Magic Carpet fleet, returning veterans from the Pacific as a unit of TG 16.12. The vessel made return trips to the west coast from Pearl Harbor, the Philippines, and Guam and Saipan. The ship was opened for visitors on Navy Day 27 October 1945 while in port at Seattle, WA. In January 1946 the ship was ordered to Bremerton for deactivation, and was decommissioned into reserve on 9 January 1947.

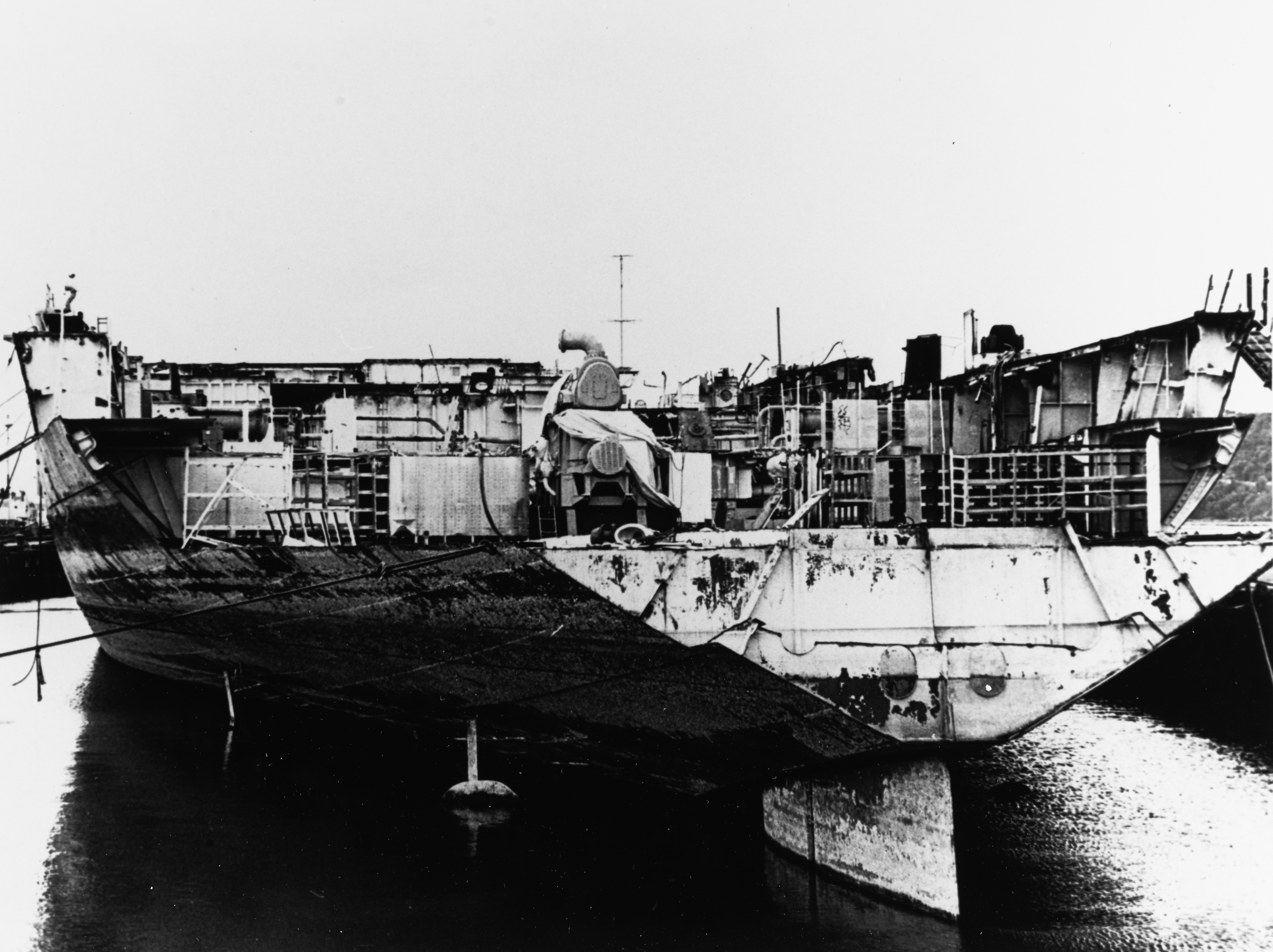
Bunker Hill being scrapped, 1973

While in reserve Bunker Hill was reclassified three times, becoming CVA-17 in October 1951, CVS-17 in August 1953, and AVT-9 in May 1959, with the latter designation indicating that any future commissioned operations would be as an "Auxiliary Aircraft Transport Carrier". As all Essex-class carriers survived the war, Bunker Hill was surplus to the needs of the navy. She and Franklin, which also had sustained severe damage from an aerial attack, were the only aircraft carriers in the Essex-class that did not have any active service after the end of World War II. Although their wartime damage had been successfully repaired, it was their resultant like-new condition which kept them out of commission, as the Navy for many years envisioned an "ultimate reconfiguration" for Bunker Hill and Franklin which never took place.

Stricken from the Naval Vessel Register in November 1966, Bunker Hill was used as a stationary electronics test platform at the Naval Air Station North Island, San Diego, during the 1960s and early 1970s. An effort to save her as a museum ship in 1972 was unsuccessful. On 2 July 1973 the vessel was sold for scrap to Zidell Explorations, Inc. of Oregon.

Some relics survive. Six hundred tons of steel armor plate, manufactured before the atomic age, are used by Fermilab as low-background steel to shield experiments from interference by ambient or background subatomic particles. Dome-shaped protective shrouds from the carrier's mothballing were incorporated in a residence in West Linn, Oregon. The ship's bell was purchased from the scrapper, displayed for a while at the San Diego Air and Space Museum, and in 1986 was provided to the guided missile cruiser which bears the name USS Bunker Hill.

== Awards ==
Bunker Hill received the Presidential Unit Citation for the 18 months between 11 November 1943 and 11 May 1945, from the first combat in the Solomon Islands to the day the ship was knocked out of the war by kamikazes. In addition, she received 11 battle stars for service in the following battles:

Navy Presidential Unit Citation	American Campaign Medal	Asiatic-Pacific Campaign Medal (11 battle stars)
World War II Victory Medal	Philippine Presidential Unit Citation	Philippine Liberation Medal

== Gallery ==
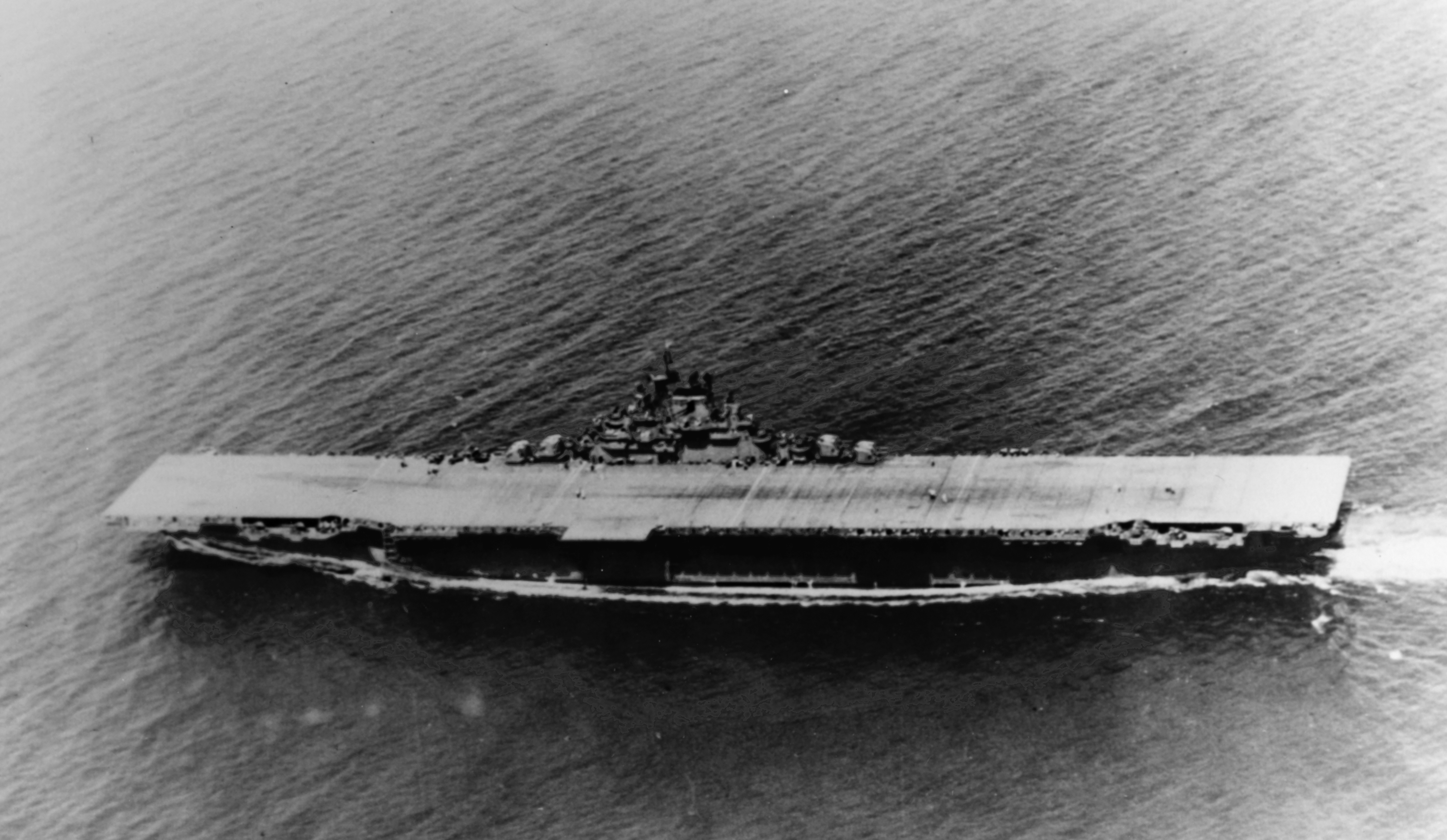
Bunker Hill underway at sea in 1943

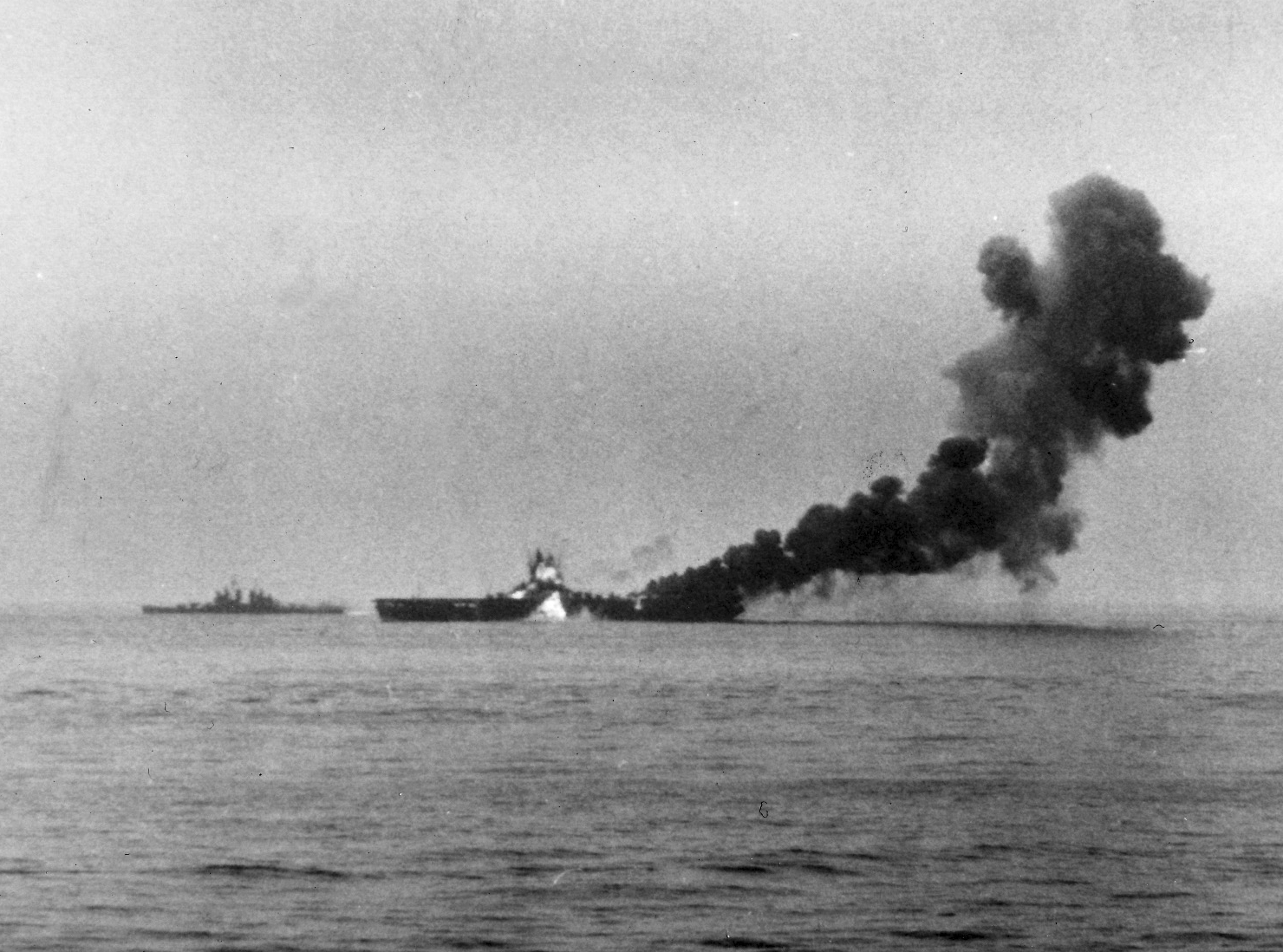
The second kamikaze strike amidships at the island, 30 seconds after the first strike aft, on 11 May 1945

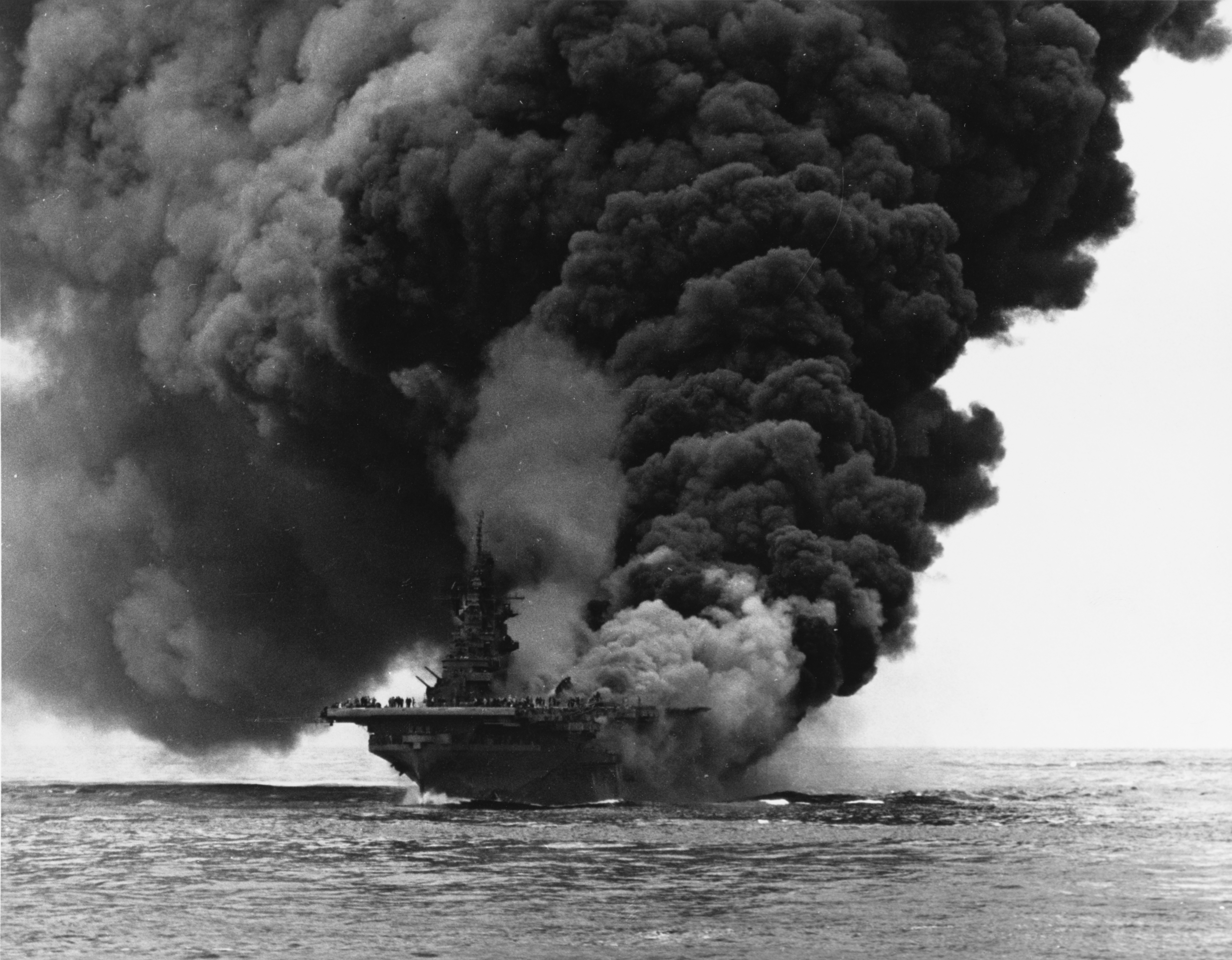
Smoke fills the sky as the fire rages on Bunker Hill on 11 May 1945

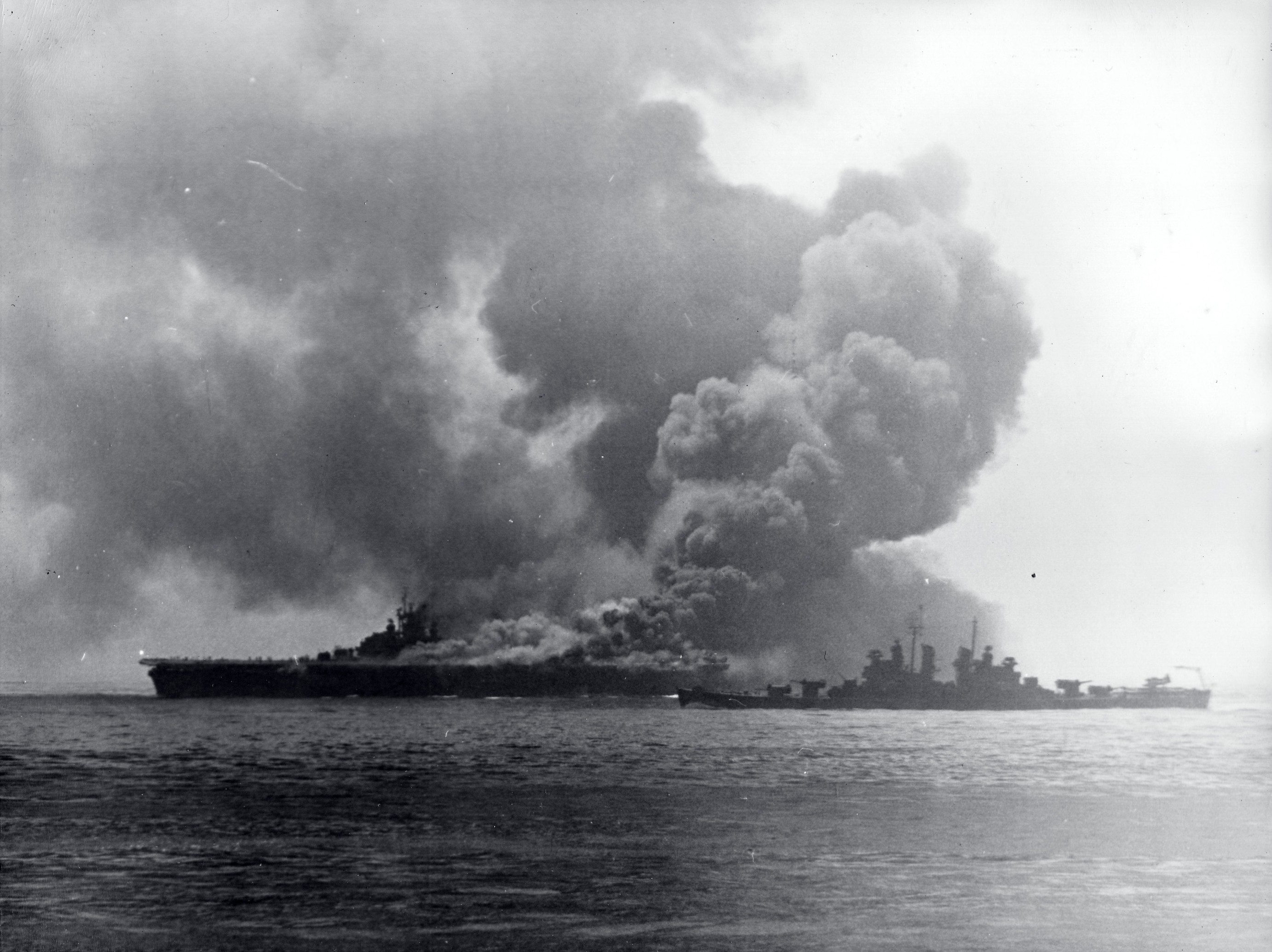
Bunker Hill burning, with Pasadena giving assistance on 11 May 1945

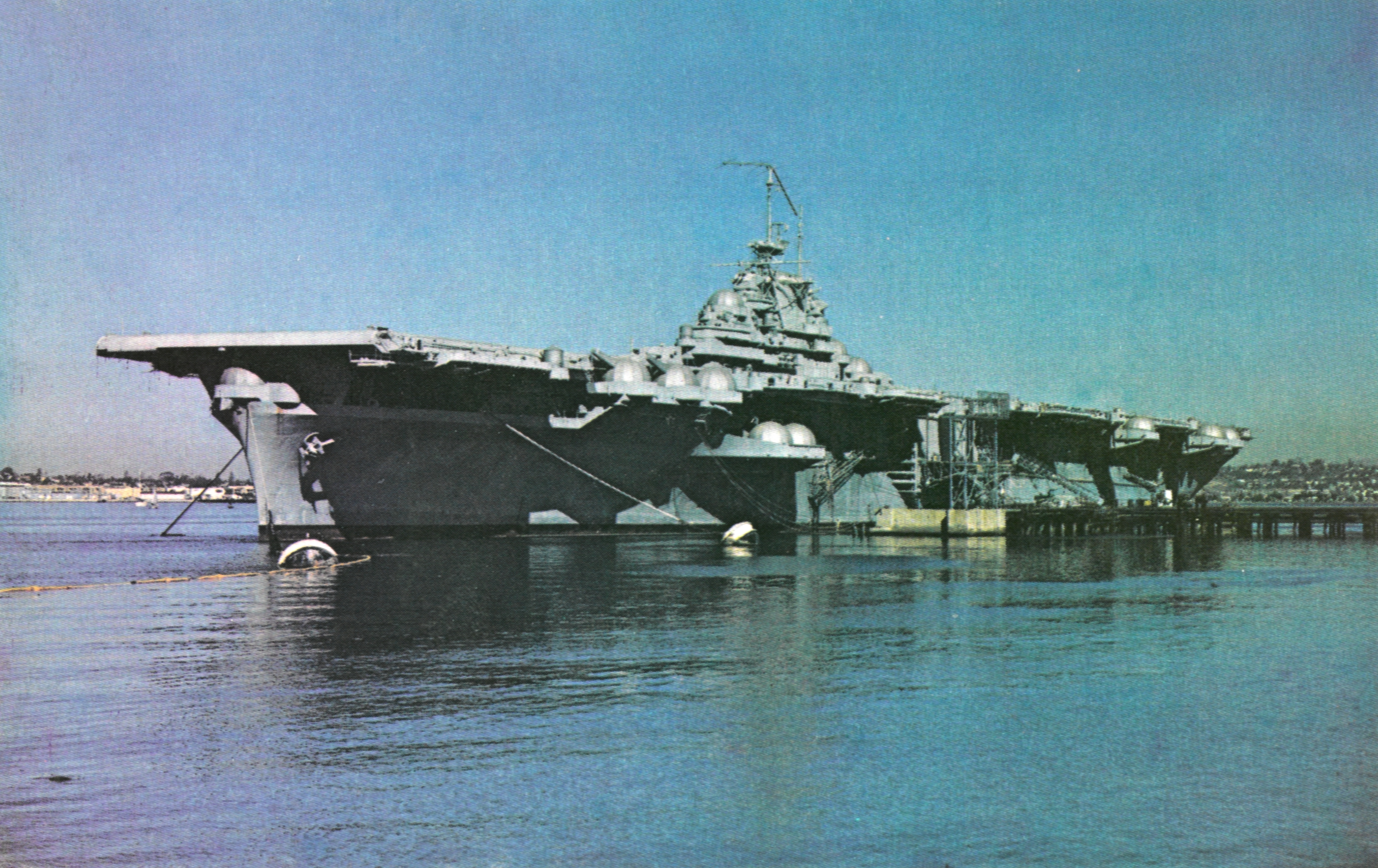
Bunker Hill moored at San Diego, California, in 1970

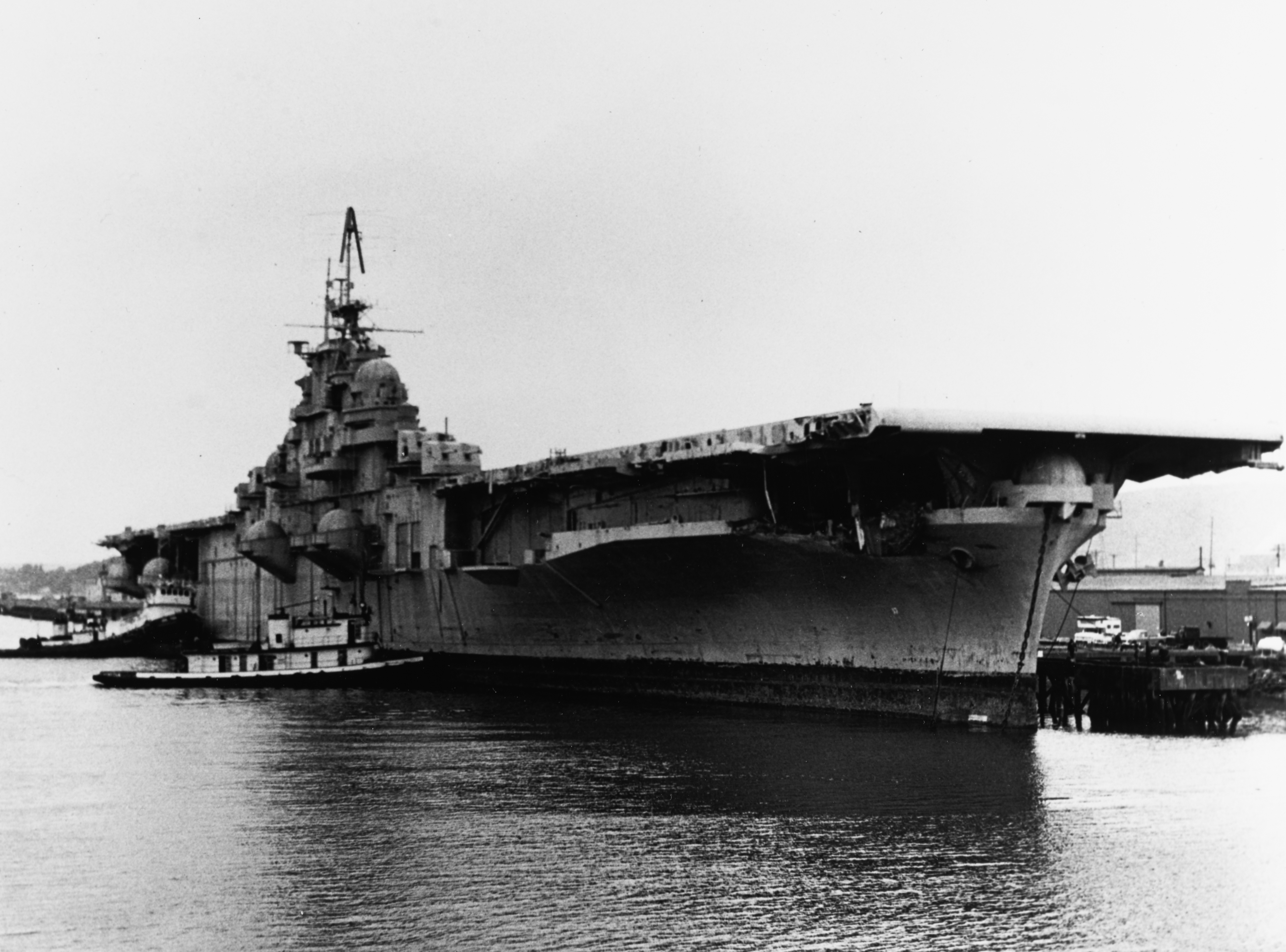
Bunker Hill arrives at Tacoma in April 1973.

== See also ==
- List of aircraft carriers
- Essex-class aircraft carrier

== External links and further reading ==
- USS Bunker Hill, Nav source.
- USS Bunker Hill pictures from the U.S. Naval History Center
- Barry, Dan, "Keeping Alive Memories That Bedevil Him", The New York Times, August 13, 2009. Story about the combat experiences of a sailor aboard ship during the kamikaze attack and their effects on his life.
