= Singapore Naval Base =

HMNB Singapore
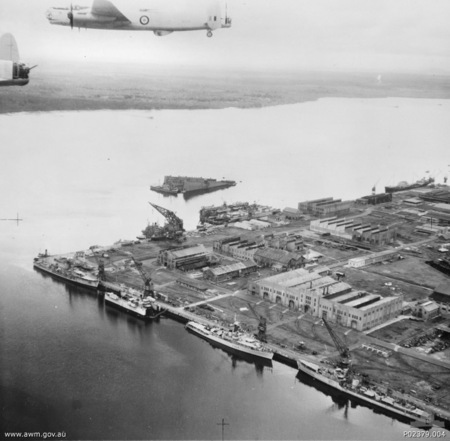
- An aerial view of the Singapore Naval Base in June 1953 from RAAF Avro Lincoln bombers.
- Active: 1938–1968
- Country: United Kingdom
- Branch: Royal Navy
- Type: Naval base
- Part of: Royal Navy

His Majesty's Naval Base, Singapore, also Her Majesty's Naval Base, Singapore (HMNB Singapore), alternatively known as the Singapore Naval Base, Sembawang Naval Base and HMS Sembawang, was situated in Sembawang at the northern tip of Singapore and was both a Royal Navy shore establishment and a cornerstone of British defence policy (the Singapore strategy) in the Far East between the World Wars. From 1921 to 1941 it was a China Station base, from 1941 to 1945 a repair facility for the Imperial Japanese Navy (IJN), and from 1945 to 1968 a Far East Fleet base. Today, it is a commercial dockyard but British military activity still exists at the British Defence Singapore Support Unit (BDSSU).

== History ==
Through the 19th century, the British Government relied on four Imperial fortress colonies as primary bases for the Royal Navy and British Army for control of the World's oceans. These were Bermuda and Halifax, Nova Scotia (military control of the latter was handed to the Canadian militia following Canadian Confederation in 1867, and naval control to the Royal Canadian Navy after 1905, along with Esquimalt Royal Naval Dockyard, which had been the main base of the Pacific Station), in the North Atlantic, and Gibraltar and Malta. As it was presumed that the only navies that could challenge the Royal Navy were those of European powers, no base equivalent to an Imperial fortress had been constructed outside of the Atlantic and its connected seas. This was despite the growing threats of the Pacific fleets of the Russian Empire and the United States during the late 19th Century. After the Great War, the British Government devoted significant resources into building a naval base on Singapore Island, where the capital of the Straits Settlements was located, as a deterrent to the increasingly ambitious Japanese Empire with its growing fleet. Britain lacked a naval 'Imperial fortress' in the broad region of Asia, the Indian Ocean, and the Pacific Ocean. Instead, the British Empire relied on the squadron of the Bermuda-based America and West Indies Station, utilising the Panama Canal after its 1914 completion, to patrol the western Atlantic and the eastern Pacific, while vessels based in Malta in the Mediterranean Sea could project naval and military force to the Indian and western Pacific oceans via the Suez Canal, which had been completed in 1869. In light of the rising threat of the Imperial Japanese Navy (IJN), this was no longer adequate.

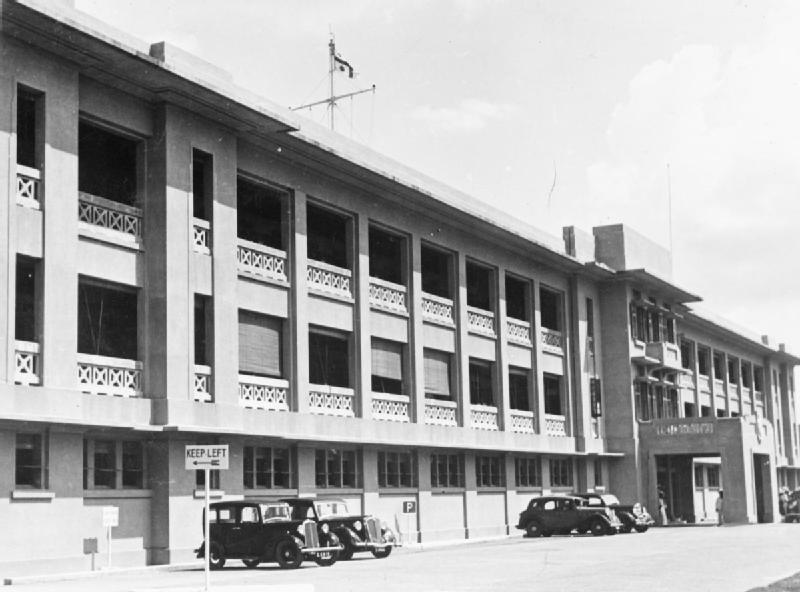
Singapore Naval Base, view of the Navy Office, which was the Headquarters of the Commander-in-Chief China Station and the Rear Admiral Malaya.

Originally announced in 1923, the construction of the base proceeded slowly at Sembawang until the Japanese invasion of Manchuria in 1931. It was completed in 1938, at a staggering cost of £60 million – equivalent to £2½ billion in 2006. The base covered 21 square miles (54 km^{2}) and had what was then the largest dry dock in the world, the third-largest floating dock, and enough fuel tanks to support the entire Royal Navy for six months.

It was defended by 15-inch naval guns stationed at Johore battery, Changi, and at Buona Vista Battery. Other important batteries of smaller calibre were located at Fort Siloso, Fort Canning, and Labrador. Air defence relied on the Royal Air Force (RAF) airfields at RAF Tengah and RAF Sembawang.

Winston Churchill touted it as the "Gibraltar of the East".

The base was renamed from HMS Terror to HMS Sultan on 1 January 1940 to acknowledge the proximity of the nine sultanates on the Malay Peninsula.

After the fall of Malaya on 31 January 1942, Singapore came within range of the artillery guns of the Twenty-Fifth Army of the Imperial Japanese Army (IJA), who were positioned in Johor within sight of the base. The IJA was poised to capture Singapore within a fortnight. The base was subsequently captured, largely intact, by units of the advancing IJA and became the IJN No. 101 Repair Facility through to the end of the Second World War, during which time it was used by all 3 Axis powers. It was used by Italian cargo-carrying submarines until the Italian Armistice, and by German cargo-carrying submarines until the German surrender.

External images
- Sembawang Naval Base
- Gate of HMS Sembawang, c. 1964
- Sembawang Naval Pier, c. 1990's

With the surrender of Japan in August 1945, control of the naval base and Singapore was reverted to British and Commonwealth Forces in September 1945, when allied units of South East Asia Command under Lord Louis Mountbatten started to arrive in Singapore.

In line with the Royal Navy's tradition of naming their respective naval base and dockyard, the accommodation barracks adjacent to the base became known as HMS Terror (from 1945 to 1971) in honour of HMS Terror, an Erebus-class monitor armed with twin 15-inch guns, which was based at one time in Singapore before the war. Since 1972, part of the compound is now occupied by the Republic of Singapore Navy's Naval Diving Unit (NDU). During the 1970s and 1980s, part of this former British naval base became the Singapore Armed Forces' Infantry Training Depot that served to provide a three-month-long basic military training (BMT) course to mostly national service recruits, and the premises continued the legacy of HMS Terror by being popularly referred to as "Terror Camp" .

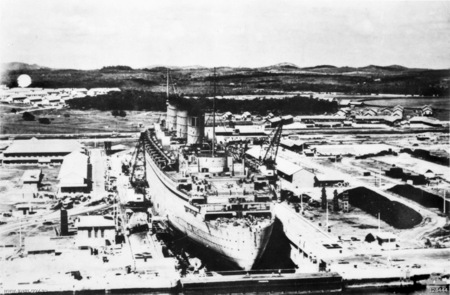
The troopship RMS Queen Mary in Singapore Graving Dock, August 1940.

=== Continued Commonwealth presence ===
With the complete withdrawal of British forces from Singapore in 1971, the Naval Base has since been handed over to the Singapore government, which in 1968 converted it into a commercial dockyard (as Sembawang Shipyard, now part of Singapore Exchange-listed SembCorp Marine).

After the short term ANZUK arrangement was terminated (started in 1971 and ended in 1974), New Zealand Force South East Asia (NZFORSEA) was created with the HQ being sited at the Stores Basin area adjacent to the current Sembawang Naval Basin. NZFORSEA consisted of 1 Royal New Zealand Infantry Regiment (RNZIR), which was based at Dieppe Barracks near Yishun New Town, No. 141 Flight of Royal New Zealand Air Force (RNZAF), with its Bell UH-1D/H Hueys based at Sembawang Air Base and frequent deployments of Royal New Zealand Navy (RNZN) frigates. This was the last major foreign military presence based in Singapore. Total military strength at the time stood at 850 with some 700 dependents. Under the auspices of the Five Power Defence Arrangements (FPDA), NZFORSEA took over the Royal Navy married quarters and billets, while the Installations Auxiliary Police Force (IAPF) was formed, the small police force was staffed by Singaporeans but commanded by an NZ officer to provide security to the whole area. This security blanket covered the British, UK and Australian facilities and personnel. When NZFORSEA withdrew from Singapore in 1989, it was replaced by the smaller NZ Defence Support Unit, the South East Asia (NZDSU SEA), with the IAPF still providing security to other nations including the US facilities and personnel.

The British Ministry of Defence (MoD) continues to maintain a small logistics base at Sembawang wharf to control most of the foreign military activities there, which includes repair, refuel and resupply for ships of the Australian, British and New Zealand navies as well as those from other Commonwealth countries under the auspices of FPDA.

=== American presence ===
As part of a 1990 agreement (concluded in 1992) between Singapore and the United States, American military forces (primarily naval and air force) have been making use of Sembawang's base facilities. The Commander, Logistics Group Western Pacific, has been headquartered in Sembawang since 1992, providing logistic support for the US 7th Fleet in its operations in the Pacific and Southeast Asia. The United States Coast Guard, Marine Inspection Detachment (MIDET) Singapore is also a tenant.

Apart from the US naval presence, the United States Air Force has its administration, logistics and support component for the 497th Combat Training Squadron being based there, while the squadron's flight operations are based at Paya Lebar Air Base.

=== Access to Indian Navy ships ===
Since 2002, Singapore has granted the Indian Navy in principle access to Sembawang Port and Indian patrol boats escorting American naval ships through the Straits of Malacca.

== Installations ==
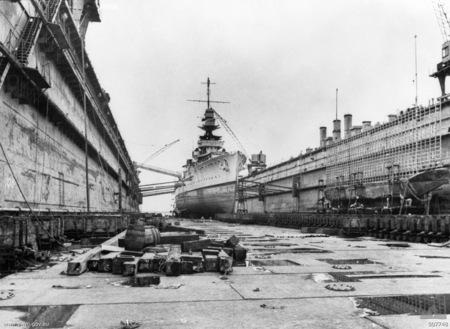
A Danae-class cruiser inside the Admiralty IX floating dry dock at Singapore Naval Base in September 1941

=== Admiralty IX Floating Dry Dock ===
Admiralty Floating Dock No.9, a large floating dry dock, the third-largest in the world at the time of its construction, was located at the base. It was used by the aircraft carrier HMS Eagle for a refit in 1939. At the time, the dry dock was described as having been floated from England to Singapore 10 years before.

=== King George VI Graving Dock ===
The graving dock was completed in February 1938 and was more than 300 m (980 ft) in length and was the largest dry dock in the world at the time. With the impending capture of Singapore by the Imperial Japanese Army in 1942, the dry dock gates were blown off and machinery destroyed. The dock was subsequently repaired and used throughout the war and was subjected to Allied air attacks to disable the dry dock in late 1944 and early 1945.

== Senior officer commanding ==
=== Captain-in-Charge, Singapore ===
Modern sources give the title "Captain-in-Charge" to the senior officer at Singapore Naval Base from 1921 to 1942, including flag officers. However, contemporary sources state that the official title wasn't granted until 1931, when Captain Birkett took on the role.

	Rank	Flag	Name	Term
Commanding officer, Singapore
1	Captain		Cloudesley V. Robinson	October 1921 – October 1923
2	Captain		Percy R. Stevens	October 1923 – December 1925
3	Captain		Hugh S. Shipway	December 1925 – October 1927
4	Captain		Geoffrey Mackworth	October 1927 – September 1929
5	Captain		C.O.Thomson	September 1929 – November 1931
Captain-in-Charge
6	Captain		Miles B. Birkett	November 1931 – November 1932
7	Captain		Malcolm R.J. Maxwell-Scott	November 1932 – September 1934
8	Commodore (Second-Class)		William P. Mark-Wardlaw	September 1934 – 11 September 1936
9	Commodore (Second-Class)		Marshall L. Clark	11 September 1936 – November 1938
10a	Commodore (First-Class)		Thomas Bernard Drew	November 1938 – August 1939
Rear Admiral, Malaya
10b	Rear-Admiral	Rear-Admiral - Royal Navy	Thomas Bernard Drew	August 1939 – 22 August 1941
11	Rear-Admiral	Rear-Admiral - Royal Navy	Ernest J. Spooner	23 August 1941 – February 1942

=== Flag Officer, Malaya and Forward Areas ===
Included:

	Rank	Flag	Name	Term
Flag Officer, Malaya and Forward Areas
1	Rear-Admiral	Rear-Admiral - Royal Navy	Sir J. Anthony V. Morse	September 1945 – April 1946
2	Rear-Admiral	Rear-Admiral - Royal Navy	H. Jack Egerton	April 1946 – December 1947
3	Vice-Admiral	Vice-Admiral - Royal Navy	Clifford Caslon	December 1947 – January 1950
4	Rear-Admiral	Rear-Admiral - Royal Navy	Hugh W. Faulkner	January 1950 – December 1951
5	Rear-Admiral	Rear-Admiral - Royal Navy	Anthony F. Pugsley	December 1951 – November 1953
6	Rear-Admiral	Rear-Admiral - Royal Navy	Ernest H. Shattock	November 1953 – April 1956

=== Flag Officer, Malayan Area ===
Included:

	Rank	Flag	Name	Term
Flag Officer, Malayan Area
1	Rear-Admiral	Rear-Admiral - Royal Navy	George A. Thring	May 1956 – 1958

== See also ==
- Japanese occupation of Singapore
- Bombing of Singapore (1944–1945)
- British military history
- British Far East Command
- Eastern Fleet
- Far East Strategic Reserve
- ANZUK
- New Zealand Force South East Asia
- SembCorp Marine
- 497th Combat Training Squadron
- Task Force 73/Commander, Logistics Group Western Pacific
