= Johore Battery =

Defunct artillery battery in Changi, Singapore

- Part of World War II-era Defence of Singapore
- Cosford Road in Changi, Singapore
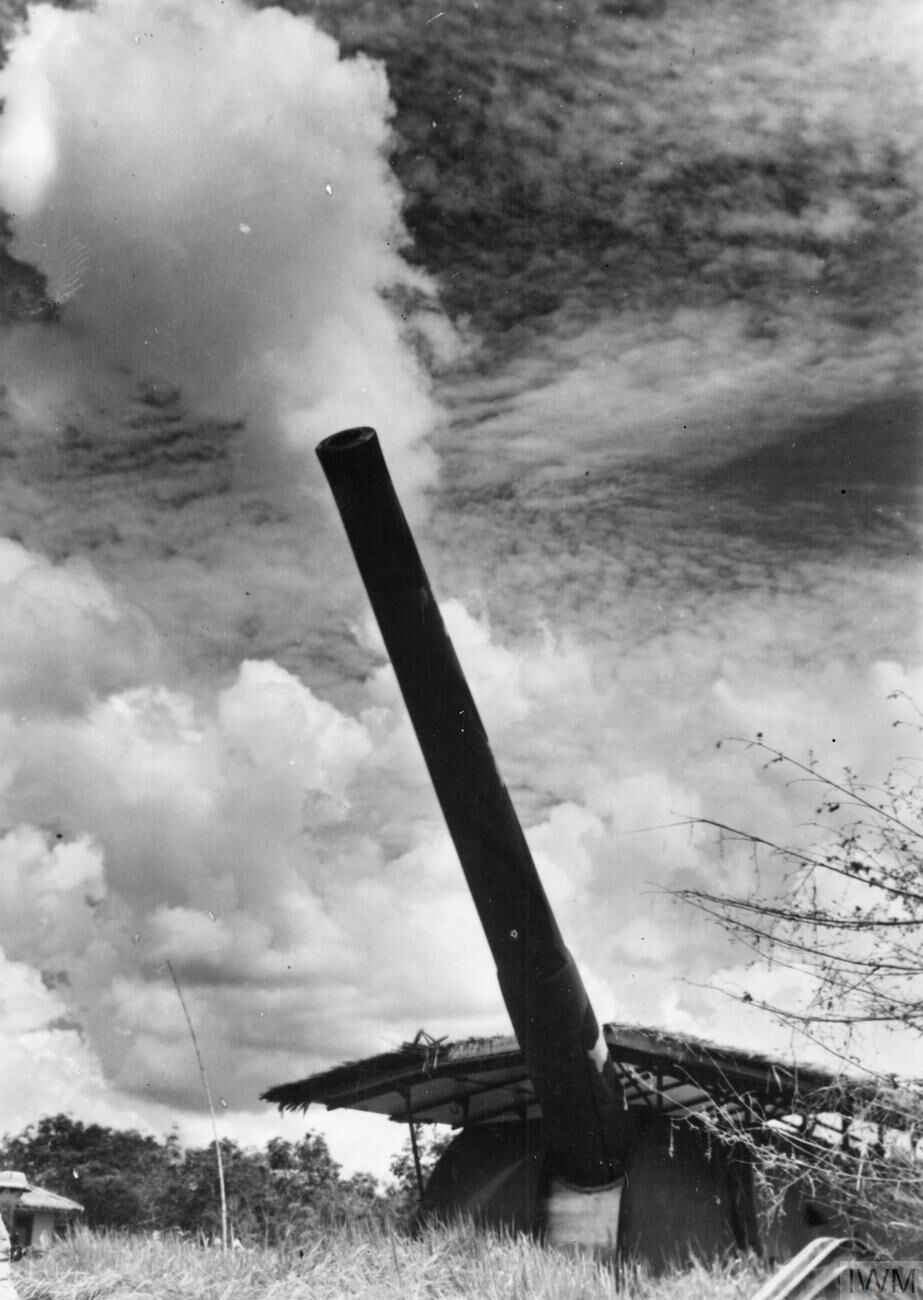
- One of Singapore's five 15-inch coastal-defence guns elevated for firing, probably some time in 1941 or 1942.

Site information
- Owner: Currently Singapore Government
- Controlled by: Formerly British military; now Singapore Government
- Open to the public: Yes
- Condition: Originals demolished and gone after WWII and now replaced with a single replica

Location
- Coordinates: 1.365167°N 103.979667°E

Site history
- Built: In 1939
- Built by: British Government
- In use: Early- to mid-February of 1942
- Materials: Concrete and steel
- Demolished: Mid-February of 1942
- Battles/wars: Battle of Singapore (WWII)
- Events: Shelling of southern Malaya (Johor) where invading Japanese forces were at in early 1942 during the war

Garrison information
- Current commander: None
- Past commanders: Unknown
- Garrison: Formerly controlled by British military; now none
- Occupants: Formerly British naval artillery troops; now vacated

The Johore Battery was a former British coastal artillery battery located in Changi on the easternmost side of mainland Singapore. It consisted of three large BL 15-inch Mk. I naval guns installed on land by the British government in the late 1930s to defend the approaching path to the east of the island to their large naval base located at Sembawang in the north (accessed via the Johor Straits) from an attacking enemy naval force.

== History ==
Five massive 15–inch naval guns were installed in Singapore by the British government before 1940, with three based in Changi to the east and two located in Buona Vista to the southwest. Collectively, the three naval guns in Changi formed the Johore Battery, named after the King of Johor, Sultan Ibrahim, who gave King George V of the UK a grand royal gift of £500,000 for his Silver Jubilee in 1935, of which £400,000 of the amount was used by the British government to fund the installation of the three large naval guns in Changi. In early 1942, the Johore Battery was employed in the Allied artillery bombardment of Johor Bahru, which at that time was under Japanese military occupation following the retreat of all Allied forces from British Malaya to Singapore.

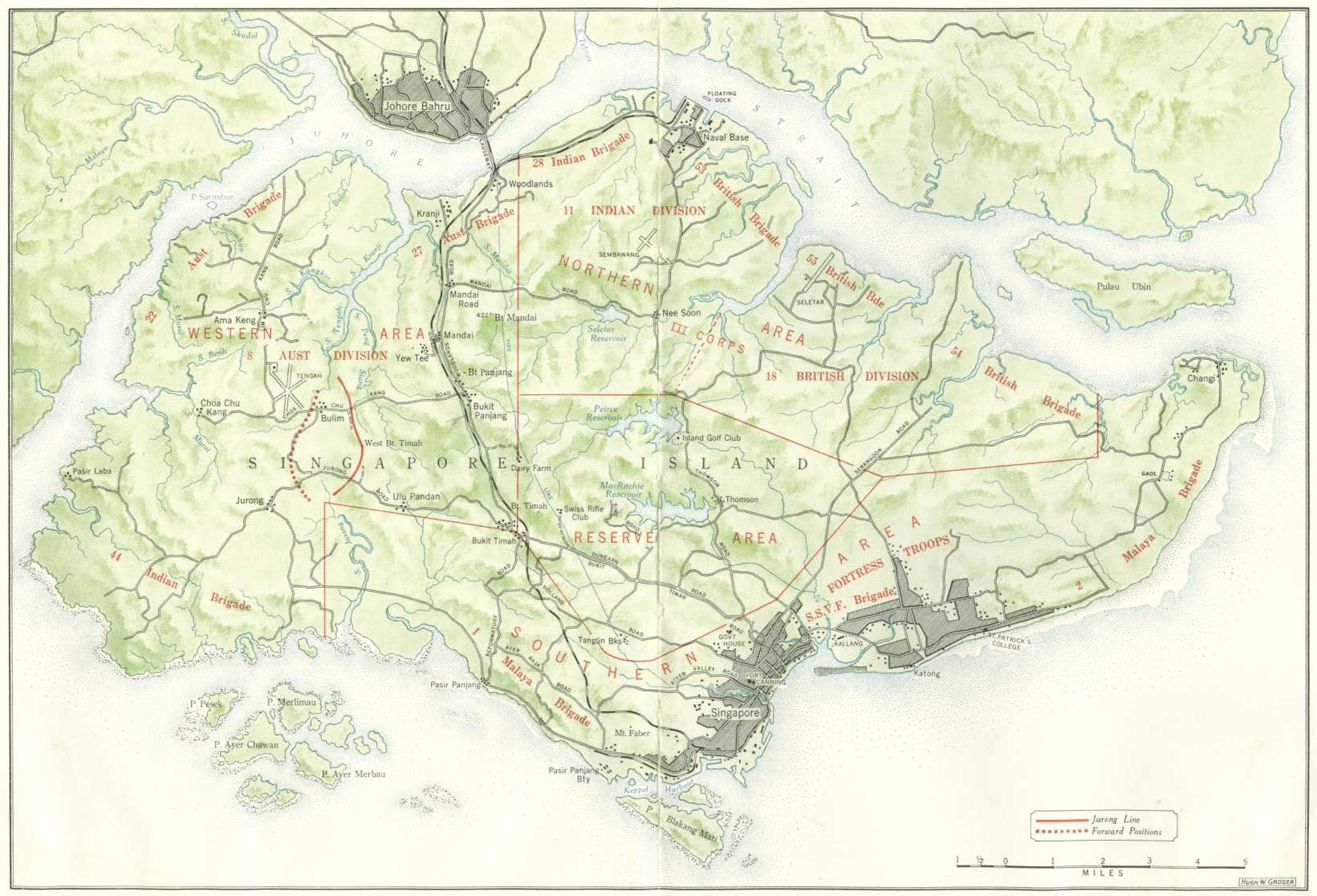
Singapore in early February 1942, with the disposition of Allied ground forces shown in red. The British naval base at Sembawang is on the northern tip of the island and Changi being on the small peninsula on the easternmost side.

Built by the British government in 1939 for the naval defence of Singapore (in particular, to defend Singapore from an aggressive Imperial Japan, which had possessed a strong and a powerful navy by the later part of the 1930s and was expanding deeper and deeper into China), the Johore Battery is a large gun emplacement site consisting of a labyrinth of tunnels. These tunnels were used to store quantities of ammunition for the three 15-inch guns (most of which were of the armour-piercing (AP) type rather than the high-explosive (HE) type as these naval guns were intended to be employed against heavily armoured enemy warships).

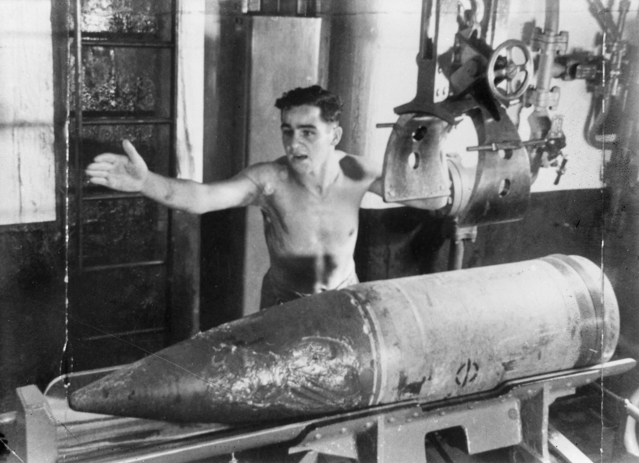
A 15-inch AP shell in the process of being hoisted up to the gun-breech in Singapore in 1940 (note the size of the shell in relation to the soldier standing beside).

These naval guns were the largest to be installed on land outside of Britain itself during World War II. They were all destroyed before the official surrender of the British Army on 15 February 1942 to the conquering Imperial Japanese military and the related tunnels (for the storage of the ammunition for the guns and gun-crew quarters) were sealed up and almost forgotten after the war in 1945.

In 1948 one of the guns was demolished and returned to England as scrap. In 1950 the Royal Army Ordnance Corps began an exercise to remove live gun shells that were buried at Changi during the British evacuation in 1942.

The location remained unknown until the Singapore Prisons Service discovered them by chance in April 1991.

== Conservation ==
The former site of the Johore battery now includes a replica of the large naval gun and a dummy 15-inch shell, placed upon a modern large lifting-lever; allowing visitors to have a feel of its 800kg weight by trying to hoist it up from the ground. The old, and still inaccessible, tunnels are marked out in a maze of above ground trails. A plaque detailing the history of the battery is present at the hut forming the entrance to the site.

Admission to the site of the battery is free with opening hours 09:00 to 17:00 Monday to Friday. The compound also includes a restaurant..

== See also ==
- Singapore strategy
