= R44 =

R44 may refer to:

- R44 (New York City Subway car)
- R44 (South Africa)
- HMS Lagos (R44), a destroyer of the Royal Navy
- R44: Risk of explosion if heated under confinement, a risk phrase
- Robinson R44, a helicopter
- CCITT R.44, a telex standard
