= HMS Hogue (D74) =

1944 Battle-class destroyer

- HMS Hogue (D74)

History

United Kingdom
- Name: HMS Hogue
- Builder: Cammell Laird, Birkenhead
- Laid down: 6 January 1943
- Launched: 21 April 1944
- Commissioned: 24 July 1945
- Identification: Pennant number D74
- Fate: Sold for scrap

General characteristics
- Class & type: Battle-class destroyer
- Displacement: 2,315 tons standard / 3,290 tons full load
- Length: 379 ft (116 m)
- Beam: 40 ft 3 in (12.27 m)
- Draught: 12.75 ft (3.89 m) standard; 15.3 ft (4.7 m) full load
- Propulsion: 2 Admiralty 3-drum boilers, 2 Parsons geared steam turbines, 2 shafts, 50,000 shp (37 MW)
- Speed: 34 knots (63 km/h)
- Range: 4,400 nmi (8,100 km) at 20 kn (37 km/h)
- Complement: 247 peace time, 308 war
- Armament: 2 × twin 4.5 in guns QF Mark III on mounting BD Mk. IV; 1 × single QF 4 inch naval gun Mk XXIII on mount Mk. III; 4 × twin 40 mm Bofors mounts "Hazemeyer" Mk. IV; 4-6 × single 40 mm Bofors mounts Mk. VII; 2 × quad tubes for 21 inch (533 mm) torpedoes Mk. IX; Two depth charge rails.; Four depth charge throwers.; Depth charges later replaced by 1 × Squid A/S mortar

HMS Hogue was a Battle-class destroyer of the Royal Navy that was commissioned during the Second World War. She was named after the Battle of La Hogue, fought between the British and French in 1692; the ship's badge a chess rook on a field blue, within a chaplet of laurel gold was derived from the arms of Admiral Sir George Rooke who distinguished himself at the battle.

Hogue was built at the Cammell Laird shipyard in Birkenhead during the Second World and launched on 21 April 1944.

== Design and construction ==
The Battle-class was developed as a result of operational experience in the early years of the Second World War, which had shown that the Royal Navy's existing destroyers had inadequate anti-aircraft protection, and in particular, lacked a modern dual-purpose main gun armament, capable of dealing with both surface targets and air attack, with guns lacking the high elevation mountings necessary to deal with dive bombers. The resulting design was armed with two twin 4.5 inch high-angle gun-turrets of a new design mounted forward and a heavy close-in anti-aircraft armament, with 16 Battle-class destroyers ordered under the 1942 construction programme. Four of these sixteen ships were to be built by Cammell Laird, with Hogue and Lagos ordered on 27 April 1942.

Hogue was 379 ft 0 in (115.52 m) long overall, 364 ft 0 in (110.95 m) at the waterline and 355 ft 0 in (108.20 m) between perpendiculars, with a beam of 40 ft 3 in (12.27 m) and a draught of 12 ft 9 in (3.89 m) normal and 15 ft 3 in (4.65 m) at full load. Displacement was 2,315 long tons (2,352 t) standard and 3,290 long tons (3,340 t) full load. Two oil-fired Admiralty 3-drum boilers supplied steam at 400 psi (2,800 kPa) and 700 °F (371 °C) to two sets of Parsons single-reduction geared steam turbines which drove two propeller shafts. The machinery was rated at 50,000 shp (37,000 kW), giving a speed of 34 kn (39 mph; 63 km/h) (31 kn (36 mph; 57 km/h) at full load). 766 long tons (778 t) of fuel oil was carried, giving an endurance of 4,400 nmi (5,100 mi; 8,100 km) at 20 kn (23 mph; 37 km/h).

Two twin 4.5 inch (113 mm) Mark IV gun mounts, capable of elevating to 85 degrees, were mounted forward, while a single 4-inch gun was fitted behind the funnel for firing starshell. Close-in anti aircraft consisted of eight Bofors 40 mm guns in four twin stabilised Hazemayer mounts, with two power-operated 2-pounder guns on the bridge wings. Two quadruple 21 inch (533 mm) torpedo-tubes were fitted, while four depth charge launchers and two racks were fitted, with 60 depth charges carried. The ship had a crew of 247 officers and other ranks.

== Service ==
Hogue, named after the 1692 Battle of La Hogue, and the third ship of that name to serve with the Royal Navy, was laid down at Cammel Laird's Birkenhead shipyard on 6 January 1943, launched on 21 April 1944 and completed on 24 July 1945.

Hogue was commissioned on 12 July 1945, The ship was assigned to the 19th Destroyer Flotilla of the British Pacific Fleet, but arrived in the Pacific too late to take part in the Second World War. She remained on station with this flotilla until early 1947, being refitted at Hong Kong in September–October 1946. Hogue was placed in reserve at Devonport on 22 May 1947.

Hogue was refitted and modernised at Devonport dockyard from March to December 1955. Hogue returned to service in 1957 with the 1st Destroyer Squadron in the Home and Mediterranean Fleets. In 1957, with sister ships Lagos and Solebay, Hogue patrolled off Cyprus, searching the fishing boats for arms and explosives. Hogue in 1958 patrolled the waters around Iceland. She operated against the Icelandic Coast Guard during the First Cod War. In September, it was claimed by Iceland that she had collided with the trawler Northern Foam while trying to prevent her being boarded by the Maria Julia.

In 1959, Hogue almost collided while refuelling with the aircraft carrier Centaur in the Bay of Biscay. She was used with the destroyer Cavalier to depict the destroyer night attacks in the film "Sink the Bismarck!".

While participating in a night-time exercise with other navies off Ceylon on 25 August, the Indian light cruiser INS Mysore, rammed into Hogue, effectively crushing the destroyer's bow and folding it level to the side of the ship, killing a sailor and injuring three others. So extensive was the damage that she remained in Singapore until broken up in 1962, having been deemed to be a "Constructive total loss".
