= Singapore strategy =

Defence policy of the British Empire (1919–1941)

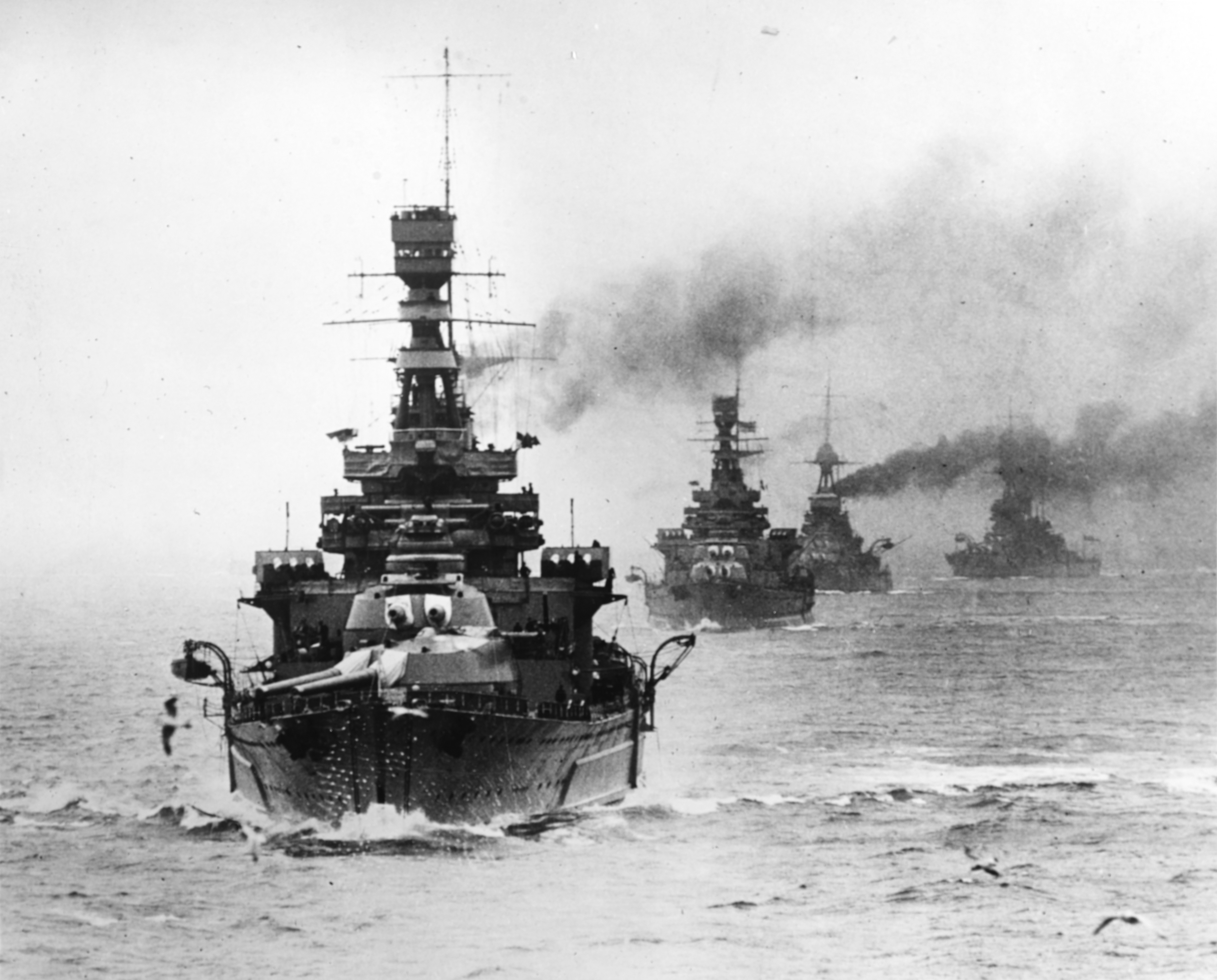
HMS Repulse leads her sister ship HMS Renown and other Royal Navy capital ships during manoeuvres in the 1920s

The Singapore strategy was a naval defence policy of the United Kingdom that evolved in a series of war plans from 1919 to 1941. It aimed to deter aggression by Japan by providing a base for a fleet of the Royal Navy in the Far East, able to intercept and defeat a Japanese force heading south towards India or Australia. To be effective it required a well-equipped base. Singapore, at the eastern end of the Strait of Malacca, was chosen in 1919 as the location of this base; work continued on this naval base and its defences over the next two decades.

The planners envisaged that a war with Japan would have three phases: while the garrison of Singapore defended the fortress, the fleet would make its way from home waters to Singapore, sally to relieve or recapture Hong Kong, and blockade the Japanese home islands to force Japan to accept terms. The idea of invading Japan was rejected as impractical, but British planners did not expect that the Japanese would willingly fight a decisive naval battle against the odds. Aware of the impact of a blockade on an island nation at the heart of a maritime empire, they felt that economic pressure would suffice.

The Singapore strategy was the cornerstone of British Imperial defence policy in the Far East during the 1920s and 1930s. By 1937, according to Stephen Roskill, "the concept of the 'Main Fleet to Singapore' had, perhaps through constant repetition, assumed something of the inviolability of Holy Writ". A combination of financial, political and practical difficulties ensured that it could not be successfully implemented. During the 1930s, the strategy came under sustained criticism in Britain and abroad, particularly in Australia where the Singapore strategy was used as an excuse for parsimonious defence policies. The strategy ultimately led to the despatch of Force Z to Singapore and the sinking of the Prince of Wales and Repulse by Japanese air attack on 10 December 1941. The subsequent ignominious fall of Singapore was described by Winston Churchill as "the worst disaster and largest capitulation in British history".

== Origins ==
After the First World War, the Imperial German Navy's High Seas Fleet that had challenged the Royal Navy for supremacy was scuttled in Scapa Flow. However, the Royal Navy was already facing serious challenges to its position as the world's most powerful fleet from the United States Navy and the Imperial Japanese Navy. The United States' determination to create what Admiral of the Navy George Dewey called "a navy second to none" presaged a new maritime arms race.

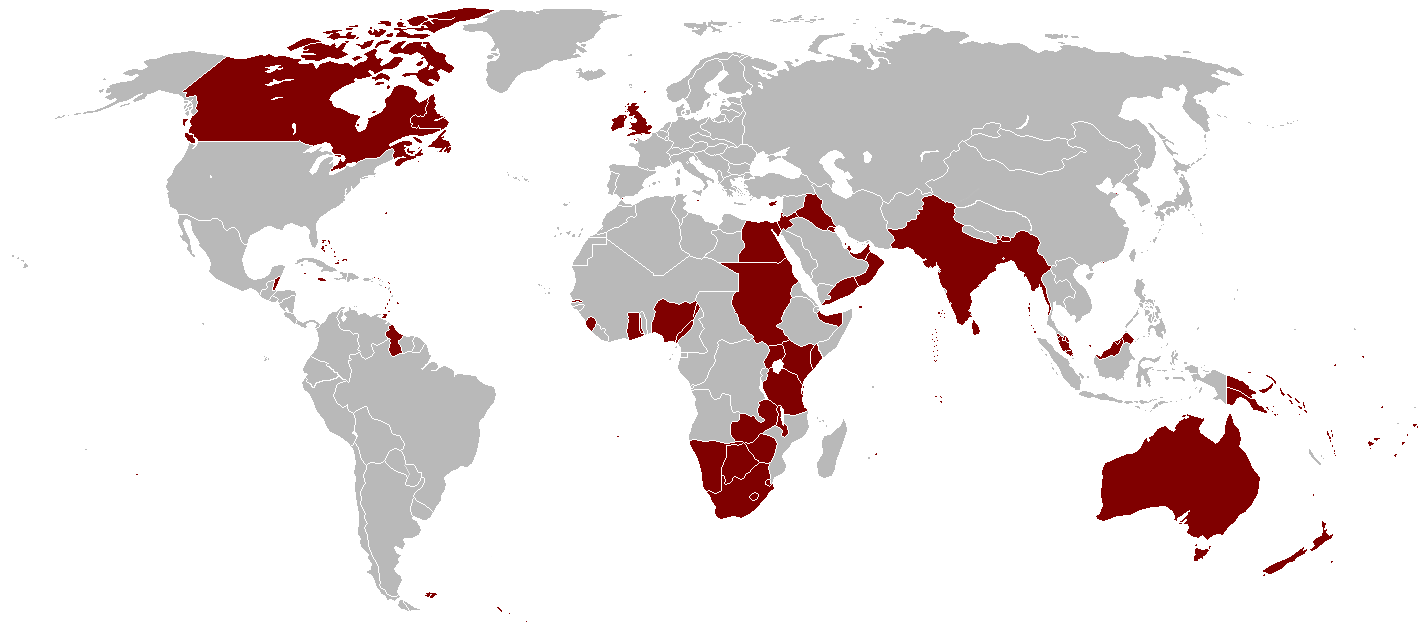
The British Empire in 1921. Australia, Canada, New Zealand, and South Africa were self-governing dominions.

The U.S. Navy was smaller than the Royal Navy in 1919 but ships laid down under its wartime construction programme were still being launched and their more recent construction gave the American ships a technological advantage. The two-power standard of 1889 called for a Royal Navy strong enough to take on any two other powers. In 1909, this was reduced to a 60% superiority in dreadnoughts.

Rising tensions over the U.S. Navy's building programme led to disputes between the First Sea Lord, Admiral Sir Rosslyn Wemyss and the Chief of Naval Operations Admiral William S. Benson in March and April 1919, although, as far back as 1909, the government directed that the United States was not to be regarded as a potential enemy. This decision was reaffirmed by Cabinet in August 1919 to preclude the U.S. Navy's building programme from becoming a justification for the Admiralty initiating one of its own. In 1920, the First Lord of the Admiralty Sir Walter Long announced a "one-power standard", under which the policy was to maintain a navy "not ... inferior in strength to the Navy of any other power". The one-power standard was promulgated at the 1921 Imperial Conference.

The Prime Ministers of the United Kingdom and the Dominions met at the 1921 Imperial Conference to determine a unified international policy, particularly the relationship with the United States and Japan. The most urgent issue was that of whether or not to renew the Anglo-Japanese Alliance, which was due to expire on 13 July 1921. The Prime Minister of Australia Billy Hughes and the Prime Minister of New Zealand Bill Massey, strongly favoured its renewal. Neither wanted their countries to be caught up in a war between the United States and Japan and contrasted the generous assistance that Japan rendered during the First World War with the United States' disengagement from international affairs in its aftermath. "The British Empire", declared Hughes, "must have a reliable friend in the Pacific". They were opposed by the Prime Minister of Canada, Arthur Meighen, on the grounds that the alliance would adversely affect the relationship with the United States, which Canada depended upon for its security. No decision to renew was reached, and the alliance was allowed to expire.

The Washington Naval Treaty in 1922 provided for a 5:5:3 ratio of capital ships of the British, United States and Japanese navies. Throughout the 1920s, the Royal Navy remained the world's largest navy, with a comfortable margin of superiority over Japan, which was regarded as the most likely adversary. The Washington Naval Treaty also prohibited the fortification of islands in the Pacific except for Singapore. The provisions of the London Naval Treaty of 1930 restricted naval construction, resulting in a serious decline in the British shipbuilding industry. German willingness to limit the size of its navy led to the Anglo-German Naval Agreement of 1935. This was seen as signalling a sincere desire to avoid conflict with Britain. In 1934, the First Sea Lord, Admiral Sir Ernle Chatfield, began to press for a new naval build-up sufficient to fight Japan and the strongest European power. He intended to accelerate construction to the maximum capacity of the shipyards but the Treasury soon became alarmed at the potential cost of the programme of £88 to £104 million. By 1938, the Treasury was losing its fight to stop rearmament; politicians and the public were more afraid of being caught unprepared for war with Germany and Japan than of a major financial crisis in the more distant future.

== Plans ==
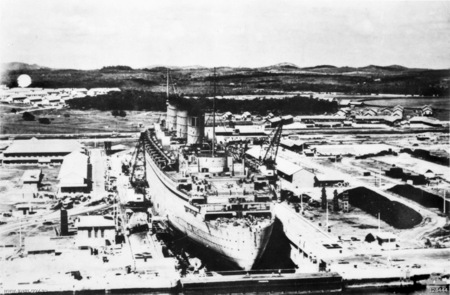
The troopship RMS Queen Mary in Singapore Graving Dock, August 1940

The Singapore strategy was a series of war plans that evolved between the wars in which the basing of a fleet at Singapore was a common but not a defining aspect. Some plans were designed to defeat Japan, while others were to deter aggression. In November 1918, the Australian Minister for the Navy, Sir Joseph Cook, had asked Admiral Lord Jellicoe to draw up a scheme for the Empire's naval defence. Jellicoe set out on a tour of the Empire in the battlecruiser HMS New Zealand in February 1919. He presented his report to the Australian government in August 1919. In a confidential section of the report, he advised that the interests of the British Empire and Japan would inevitably clash. He called for the creation of a British Pacific Fleet strong enough to counter the Imperial Japanese Navy, which he believed would require 8 battleships, 8 battlecruisers, 4 aircraft carriers, 10 cruisers, 40 destroyers, 36 submarines and supporting auxiliaries.

Although he did not specify a location, Jellicoe noted that the fleet would require a major dockyard somewhere in the Far East. A paper entitled "The Naval Situation in the Far East" was considered by the Committee of Imperial Defence in October 1919. In this paper the naval staff pointed out that maintaining the Anglo-Japanese Alliance might lead to war between the British Empire and the United States. In 1920, the Admiralty issued War Memorandum (Eastern) 1920, instructions in the event of a war with Japan. In it, the defence of Singapore was described as "absolutely essential". The strategy was presented to the Dominions at the 1923 Imperial Conference. The authors of the memorandum divided a war with Japan into three phases. In the first phase, the garrison of Singapore would defend the fortress while the fleet made its way from home waters to Singapore. The fleet would sail from Singapore and relieve or recapture Hong Kong. The final phase would see the fleet blockade Japan and force it to accept terms.

Most planning focused on the first phase, which involved the fortification of Singapore. For the second phase, a naval base capable of supporting a fleet was required. While the United States had constructed a graving dock capable of taking battleships at Pearl Harbor between 1909 and 1919, the Royal Navy had no such base east of Malta. In April 1919, the Plans Division of the Admiralty produced a paper which examined possible locations for a naval base in the Pacific in case of a war with the United States or Japan. Hong Kong was considered but regarded as too vulnerable, while Sydney was regarded as secure but too far from Japan. Singapore emerged as the best compromise location.

War Memorandum (Eastern), The Route to the East

Estimates of the time for the fleet to reach Singapore after the outbreak of hostilities varied. It had to include the assembly of the fleet, preparations for the voyage and transit to Singapore. The first estimate was 42 days, assuming reasonable warning. In 1938, it was increased to 70 days, with 14 more for provisioning. It was further increased in June 1939 to 90 days plus 15 for provisioning and in September 1939, to 180 days.

Oil storage facilities were constructed at Gibraltar, Malta, Port Said, Port Sudan, Aden, Colombo, Trincomalee, Rangoon, Singapore and Hong Kong. A complicating factor was that the battleships could not traverse the Suez Canal fully laden, so they would have to refuel on the other side. Singapore was to have storage for 1,250,000 long tons (1,270,000 t) of oil. Secret bases were established at Kamaran Bay, Addu Atoll and Nancowry. It was estimated that the fleet would require 110,000 long tons (110,000 t) of oil per month, which would be transported in sixty tankers. Oil would be shipped in from the refineries at Abadan and Rangoon, supplemented by buying the entire output of the Netherlands East Indies.

The third phase received the least consideration but naval planners were aware that Singapore was too far from Japan to provide an adequate base for operations near Japan. The further the fleet proceeded from Singapore, the weaker it would become. If American assistance was forthcoming, there was the prospect of Manila being used as a forward base. The idea of invading Japan and fighting its armies was rejected as impractical but the British planners did not expect that the Japanese would willingly fight a decisive naval battle against the odds. They were therefore drawn to the concept of a blockade; from experience they were aware of the impact it could have on an island nation at the heart of a maritime empire and felt that economic pressure would suffice.

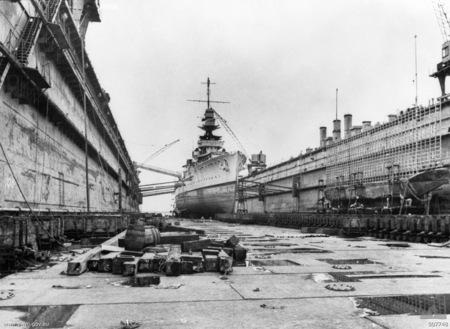
A British warship inside the Admiralty IX floating dry dock at Singapore Naval Base in September 1941

Japan's vulnerability to blockade was studied; with information from the Board of Trade and the naval attaché in Tokyo, the planners estimated that the British Empire accounted for around 27 per cent of Japan's imports. In most cases these imports could be replaced from sources in China and the United States. Some critical materials for which Japan relied heavily on imports were identified, including metals, machinery, chemicals, oil and rubber and many of the best sources were under British control. Japanese access to neutral shipping could be restricted by refusing insurance to ships trading with Japan and by chartering ships to reduce the number available.

Enforcement of a close naval blockade would make ships vulnerable to attack by aircraft and submarines. Blockading Japanese ports with small ships was a possibility but this would require the destruction or neutralisation of the Japanese fleet and it was far from certain that the Japanese fleet would place itself in a position where it could be destroyed. A plan was adopted for a more distant blockade, whereby ships bound for Japan would be intercepted as they passed through the East Indies or the Panama Canal. This would not cut off Japanese trade with China or Korea and probably not with the United States. The effectiveness of such a blockade was therefore questionable.

Rear Admiral Sir Herbert Richmond, the Commander in Chief, East Indies Station, noted that the logic was suspiciously circular:

- We are going to force Japan to surrender by cutting off her essential supplies.
- We cannot cut off her essential supplies until we defeat her fleet.
- We cannot defeat her fleet if it will not come out to fight.
- We shall force it to come out to fight by cutting off her essential supplies.

The 1919 plans incorporated a Mobile Naval Base Defence Organisation (MNBDO) which could build and defend a forward base. The MNBDO had a strength of 7,000 and included a brigade of anti-aircraft guns, a brigade of coastal artillery and a battalion of infantry, all drawn from the Royal Marines. In one paper exercise, the Royal Marines occupied Nakagusuku Bay unopposed and the MNBDO constructed base from which the fleet blockaded Japan. Fleet exercises were conducted in the Mediterranean in the 1920s to test the MNBDO concept. The Royal Marines were not greatly interested in amphibious warfare and lacking organisational backing, the techniques and tactics of amphibious warfare began to atrophy. By the 1930s the Admiralty was concerned that the United States and Japan were well ahead of Britain in this field and persuaded the Army and RAF to join with it in establishing the Inter-Service Training and Development Centre, which opened in July 1938. Under its first commandant, Captain Loben Maund, it began investigating the problems of amphibious warfare, including the design of landing craft.

In the 1920s, Colonel the Master of Sempill led the semi-official Sempill Mission to Japan to help the Imperial Japanese Navy establish an air arm. The Royal Navy was the world leader in naval aviation and the Sempill mission taught advanced techniques such as carrier deck landing, conducted training with modern aircraft and provided engines, ordnance and technical equipment. Within a decade, Japan had overtaken Britain. The Royal Navy pioneered the armoured flight deck, which enabled carriers to absorb damage but this limited the number of aircraft that a carrier could operate. The Royal Navy had great faith in the ability of ships' anti-aircraft batteries and saw little need for high performance fighters. To maximise the benefit of the small numbers of aircraft that could be carried, the Royal Navy developed multi-role aircraft such as the Blackburn Roc, Fairey Fulmar, Fairey Barracuda, Blackburn Skua and Fairey Swordfish. Fleet Air Arm aircraft were no match for their Japanese counterparts.

The possibility of Japan taking advantage of a war in Europe was foreseen. In June 1939, the Tientsin Incident showed that Germany might take advantage of a war in the Far East. In the event of war with Germany, Italy and Japan, two approaches were considered. The first was to reduce the war to one against Germany and Japan only by knocking Italy out of the conflict as quickly as possible. The former First Sea Lord, Sir Reginald Drax, who was brought out of retirement to advise on strategy, called for a "flying squadron" of four or five battleships, along with an aircraft carrier, some cruisers and destroyers, to be sent to Singapore. Such a force would be too small to fight the Japanese main fleet, but could protect British trade in the Indian Ocean against commerce raiders. Drax argued that a small, fast force would be better in this role than a large, slow one. When more ships became available, it could become the nucleus of a full-sized battle fleet. Chatfield, now Minister for Coordination of Defence, disagreed with this concept. He felt that the flying squadron would become nothing more than a target for the Japanese fleet. Instead, he proposed that the Mediterranean be abandoned and the fleet sent to Singapore.

== Base development ==
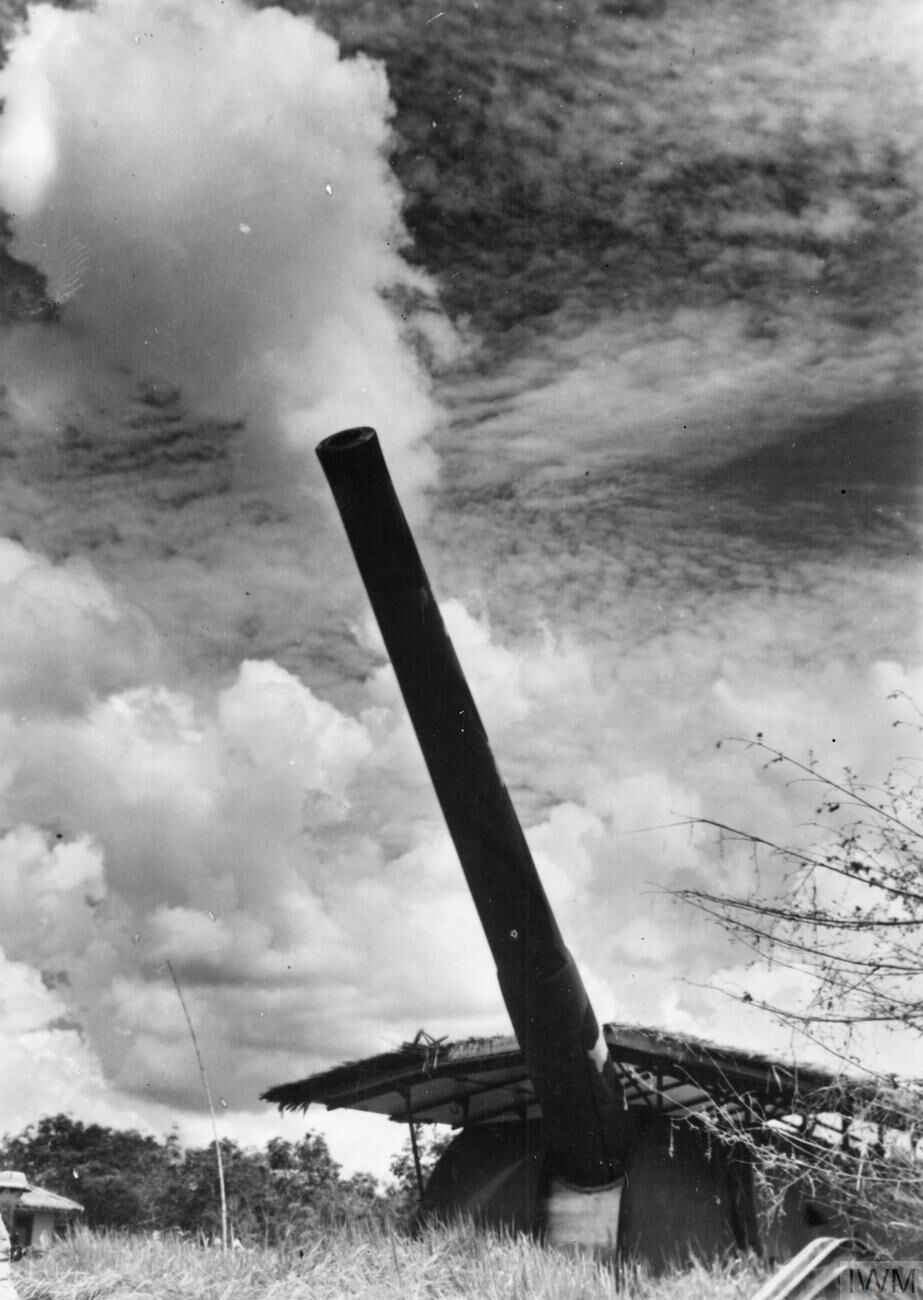
One of Singapore's 15-inch coastal defence guns elevated for firing

Following surveys, a site at Sembawang was chosen for a naval base. The Straits Settlements made a gift of 2,845 acres (1,151 ha) of land for the site and a sum of £250,000 for construction of the base was donated by Hong Kong in 1925. The money exceeded the British contribution that year of £204,000 towards the floating dock. Another £2,000,000 was paid by the Federated Malay States; New Zealand donated £1,000,000. The contract for construction of the naval dockyard was awarded to the lowest bidder, Sir John Jackson Limited, for £3,700,000. About 6,000,000 cu yd (4,600,000 m^{3}) of earth were moved to level the ground and 8,000,000 cu yd (6,100,000 m^{3}) of marsh was filled in. The floating dock was constructed in England and towed to Singapore by Dutch tugboats. It was 1,000 ft (300 m) long and 1,300 ft (400 m) wide, making it one of the largest in the world. There would be 5,000 ft (1,500 m) of deep water quays and infrastructure including warehouses, workshops and hospitals.

To defend the naval base, heavy 15-inch naval guns (381.0 mm) were emplaced at Johore battery, Changi and at Buona Vista to deal with battleships. Medium BL 9.2 inch guns (233.7 mm) were provided for dealing with smaller ships. Batteries of small-calibre anti-aircraft guns and guns for dealing with raids were located at Fort Siloso, Fort Canning and Labrador. The five 15-inch guns were surplus naval guns, manufactured between 1903 and 1919. Part of their cost was met from a gift of £500,000 from Sultan Ibrahim of Johor for the Silver Jubilee of the coronation King George V. Three of the guns were given an all-round (360°) traverse and subterranean magazines.

Plans called for an air force of 18 flying boats, 18 reconnaissance fighters, 18 torpedo bombers and 18 single-seat fighters to protect them. Royal Air Force airfields were established at RAF Tengah and RAF Sembawang. The Chief of the Air Staff, Air Marshal Lord Trenchard, argued that 30 torpedo bombers could replace the 15-inch guns. The First Sea Lord, Admiral of the Fleet Lord Beatty, did not agree. A compromise was reached whereby the guns would be installed but the issue was reconsidered when better torpedo planes became available. Test firings of 15-inch and 9.2-inch guns at Malta and Portsmouth in 1926 indicated that greatly improved shells were required if the guns were to have a chance of hitting a battleship.

The King George VI dry dock was formally opened by the Governor of the Straits Settlements, Sir Shenton Thomas, on 14 February 1938. Two squadrons of the Fleet Air Arm provided a flypast. The 42 vessels in attendance included three US Navy cruisers. The presence of this fleet gave an opportunity to conduct a series of naval, air and military exercises. The aircraft carrier HMS Eagle was able to sail undetected to within 135 miles (217 km) of Singapore and launch a series of surprise raids on the RAF airfields. The local air commander, Air Vice-Marshal Arthur Tedder, was greatly embarrassed. The local land commander, Major-General Sir William Dobbie, was no less disappointed by the performance of the anti-aircraft defences. Reports recommended the installation of radar on the island but this took until 1941. The naval defences worked better but a landing party from HMS Norfolk was still able to capture the Raffles Hotel. What most concerned Dobbie and Tedder was the possibility of the fleet being bypassed entirely by an invasion of Malaya from Thailand. Dobbie conducted an exercise in southern Malaya which demonstrated that the jungle was far from impassable. The Chiefs of Staff Committee concluded that the Japanese would most likely land on the east coast of Malaya and advance on Singapore from the north.

== Australia ==
In the 1920s, the conservative Nationalist Party government of Stanley Bruce favoured the Singapore strategy, which called for reliance on the Royal Navy, supported by a naval squadron as strong as Australia could afford. However, Bruce and his predecessor Billy Hughes had concerns over the logistics of the strategy, with Hughes' advisor Percy Grant drawing his attention to Singapore's strategic weakness and relative isolation from the UK and Australia as early as 1921. Between 1923 and 1929, £20,000,000 was spent on the Royal Australian Navy (RAN), while the Australian Army and the munitions industry received only £10,000,000 and the fledgling Royal Australian Air Force (RAAF) just £2,400,000. The policy had the advantage of pushing responsibility for Australian defence onto Britain. Unlike New Zealand, Australia declined to contribute to the cost of the base at Singapore. In petitioning a parsimonious government for more funds, the Australian Army had to rebut the Singapore strategy, "an apparently well-argued and well-founded strategic doctrine that had been endorsed at the highest levels of imperial decision-making".

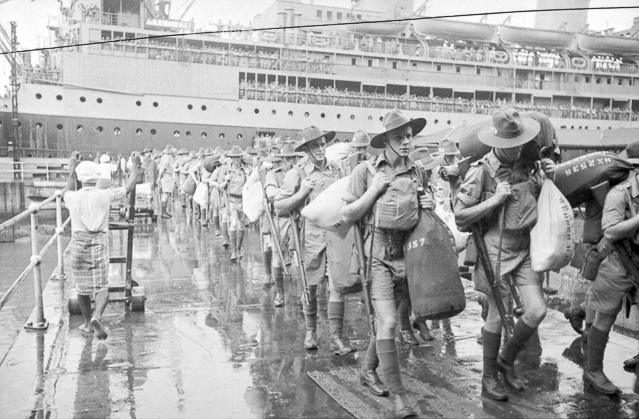
Troops of the ill-fated Australian 8th Division disembark at Singapore Harbour 15 August 1941.

An alternative policy was put forward in 1923 by the Australian Labor Party, which was in opposition for all but two years of the 1920s and 1930s. It called for Australia to rely on a powerful air force, supported by a well-equipped army that could be rapidly expanded to meet an invasion threat, which would need a big munitions industry. Labor politicians cited critics like Rear Admiral William Freeland Fullam, who drew attention to the vulnerability of warships to aircraft, naval mines and submarines. The Labor Party's Albert Green noted in 1923 that when a battleship of the day cost £7,000,000 and an aircraft cost £2,500, there was a genuine cause for concern as to whether the battleship was a better investment than hundreds of aircraft, if the aircraft could sink battleships. The Labor Party's policy became indistinguishable from the position of the Australian Army.

In September 1926, Lieutenant Colonel Henry Wynter gave a lecture to the United Services Institute of Victoria titled "The Strategical Inter-relationship of the Navy, the Army and the Air Force: An Australian View", which was published in the April 1927 edition of British Army Quarterly. Wynter argued that war was most likely to break out in the Pacific at a time when Britain was involved in a crisis in Europe, which would prevent Britain from sending sufficient resources to Singapore. He contended that Singapore was vulnerable, especially to attack from the land and the air and argued for a more balanced policy of building up the Army and RAAF rather than relying on the RAN. "Henceforward", wrote Australian official historian Lionel Wigmore, "the attitude of the leading thinkers in the Australian Army towards British assurances that an adequate fleet would be sent to Singapore at the critical time was (bluntly stated): 'We do not doubt that you are sincere in your beliefs but, frankly, we do not think you will be able to do it". In 1934, deputy prime minister John Latham visited Singapore as part of the Australian Eastern Mission. He was critical of the state of the naval base in a secret report to cabinet, describing it as "chaotic".

Frederick Shedden wrote a paper putting the case for the Singapore strategy as a means of defending Australia. He argued that since Australia was also an island nation, it followed that it would also be vulnerable to a naval blockade. If Australia could be defeated without an invasion, the defence of Australia had to be a naval one. Colonel John Lavarack, who had attended the Imperial Defence College class of 1928 with Shedden, disagreed. Lavarack responded that the vast coastline of Australia would make a naval blockade very difficult and its considerable internal resources meant that it could resist economic pressure. When Richmond attacked the Labor Party's position in an article in the British Army Quarterly in 1933, Lavarack wrote a rebuttal. In 1936, the leader of the opposition John Curtin read an article by Wynter in the House of Representatives. Wynter's outspoken criticism of the Singapore strategy led to his transfer to a junior post. Soon after the outbreak of war with Germany on 3 September 1939, the Prime Minister, Robert Menzies, appointed a British officer, Lieutenant General Ernest Squires, to replace Lavarack as Chief of the General Staff. Within months, the Chief of the Air Staff was replaced with a British officer as well.

By the late 1930s, the Lyons government had become increasingly skeptical of Britain's commitment to the Singapore strategy and Australian security in general. Prime Minister Joseph Lyons refused British requests for two RAAF squadrons to be stationed in Singapore. In 1938, Lyons told UK High Commissioner Geoffrey Whiskard that he had formed the view that "Britain would not, or could not, offer any substantial defence assistance to Australia". However, in public he continued to press for commitments from British officials. Lyons was influenced by the views of Hughes, now external affairs minister, who was a critic of the Singapore strategy and advocacy of air power over naval power. In April 1938, Lyons announced a significant expansion of his government's rearmament programme, with funding for the RAAF exceeding that of the army for the first time. In parliament he stated that "complementary to this conception of Empire collective security we should do all that we can to defend ourselves". In December 1938, further details of the government's "local defence" programme were presented by defence minister Geoffrey Street, including the construction of "mini-Singapore" naval bases at Darwin and Port Moresby which were a response to concerns over a possible Japanese invasion of Australia.

== New Zealand ==
The Reform Government of 1912–1928, United Government 1928–1931, United-Reform Coalition Government of 1931–1935 and the First Labour Government in 1935–1949 supported the Singapore Strategy. The New Zealand financial contribution was eight annual payments of £125,000, a million pounds in total, rather than the £225,000 annually proposed by the Admiralty. Expansion of the New Zealand Devonport Naval Base was also proposed and in 1926 the alternative of a third cruiser was considered. Labour, on coming to power in 1935, gave more importance to a local air force, though later Walter Nash accepted the need to keep sea lanes open. There was little liaison with Australia; in 1938 New Zealand Chiefs of Staff papers were sent to London but not Australia. By 1936 New Zealand military confidence in the Singapore Strategy was waning; with the possibility of Italy as well as Germany and Japan as enemies, in seemed likely that Britain would also be committed in the Mediterranean.

== Second World War ==
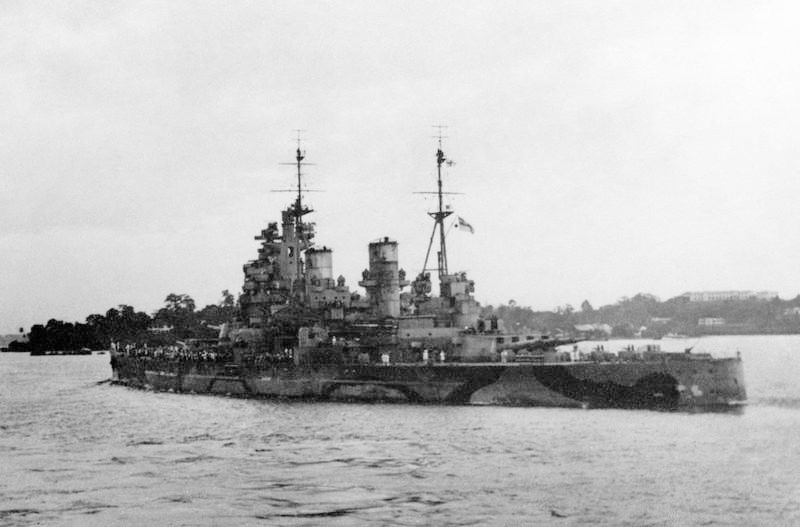
HMS Prince of Wales leaves Singapore on 8 December 1941

With war with Germany now a reality, Menzies sent Richard Casey to London to seek reassurances about the defence of Australia in the event that Australian forces were sent to Europe or the Middle East. In November 1939, Australia and New Zealand were given assurances that Singapore would not be allowed to fall and that in the event of war with Japan, the defence of the Far East would take priority over the Mediterranean. This seemed possible as the Kriegsmarine, the German navy, was relatively small and France was an ally. Bruce, now Australian High Commissioner to the United Kingdom and Casey met with British Cabinet ministers on 20 November and left with the impression that, despite the assurances, the Royal Navy was not strong enough to deal with simultaneous crises in Europe, the Mediterranean and the Far East.

In June 1940 Italy joined the war on Germany's side and France was defeated. The Chiefs of Staff Committee reported,

The security of our imperial interests in the Far East lies ultimately in our ability to control sea communications in the south-western Pacific, for which purpose adequate fleet must be based at Singapore. Since our previous assurances in this respect, however, the whole strategic situation has been radically altered by the French defeat. The result of this has been to alter the whole of the balance of naval strength in home waters. Formerly we were prepared to abandon the Eastern Mediterranean and dispatch a fleet to the Far East, relying on the French fleet in the Western Mediterranean to contain the Italian fleet. Now if we move the Mediterranean fleet to the Far East there is nothing to contain the Italian fleet, which will be free to operate in the Atlantic or reinforce the German fleet in home waters, using bases in north-west France. We must therefore retain in European waters sufficient naval forces to watch both the German and Italian fleets, and we cannot do this and send a fleet to the Far East. In the meantime the strategic importance to us of the Far East both for Empire security and to enable us to defeat the enemy by control of essential commodities at the source has been increased.

In secret talks in Washington, D.C., in June 1939, the Chief of Naval Operations, Admiral William D. Leahy, raised the possibility of an American fleet being sent to Singapore. In April 1940, the American naval attaché in London, Captain Alan Kirk, approached the Vice Chief of the Naval Staff, Vice-Admiral Sir Thomas Phillips, to ask if, in the event of the United States Fleet being sent to the Far East, the docking facilities at Singapore could be made available, as those at Subic Bay were inadequate. He received assurances that they would be. Hopes for American assistance were dashed at the staff conference in Washington, D.C., in February 1941. The U.S. Navy concentrated on the Atlantic and the American chiefs envisaged relieving British warships in the Atlantic and Mediterranean so a British fleet could be sent to the Far East.

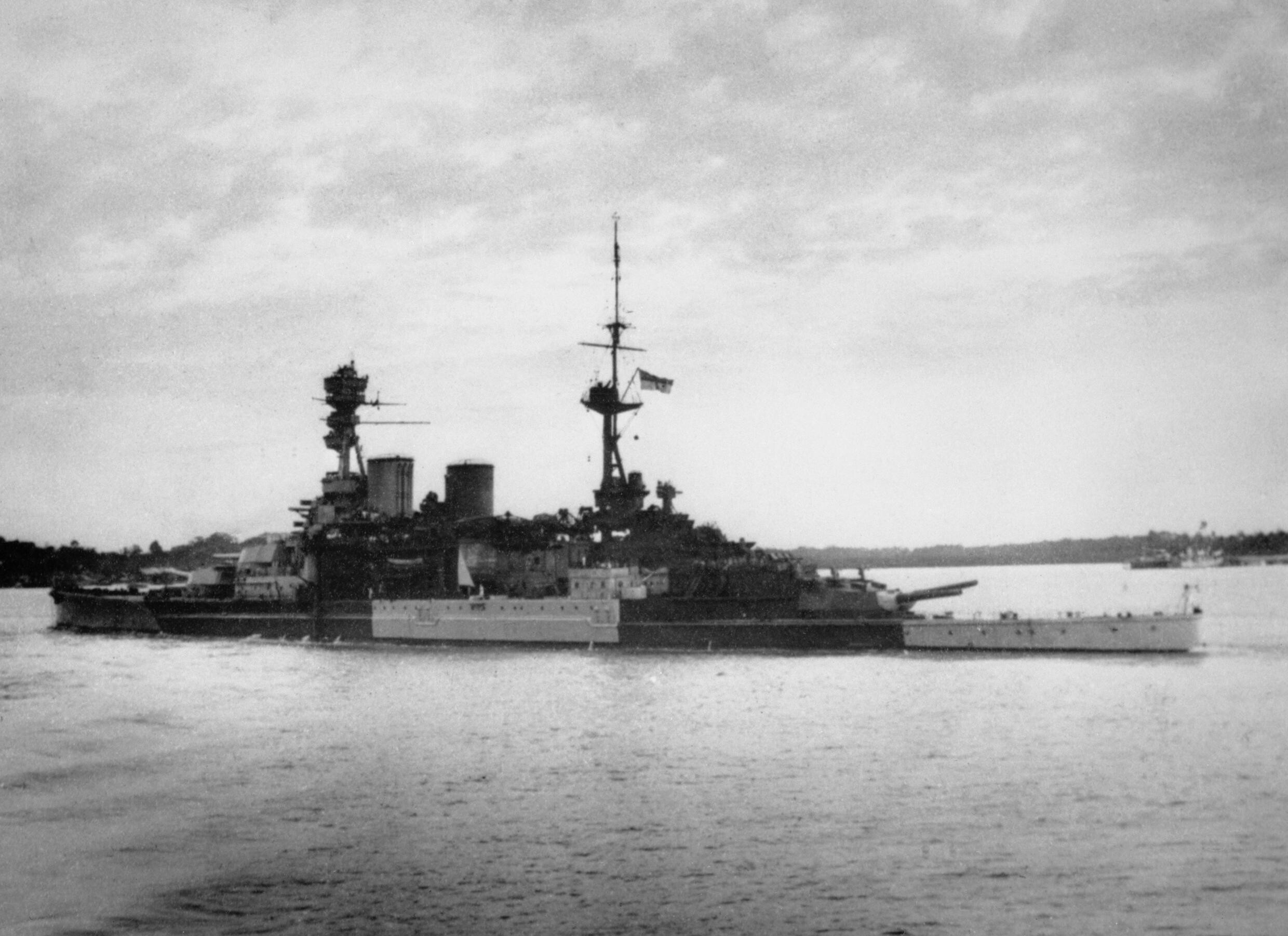
HMS Repulse leaves Singapore on 8 December 1941

In July 1941, the Japanese occupied Cam Ranh Bay in French Indochina, which the British fleet had hoped to use on its northward drive, which put the Japanese much closer to Singapore. As diplomatic relations with Japan worsened, in August 1941, the Admiralty and the Chiefs of Staff began considering what ships could be sent. The Chiefs of Staff decided to recommend HMS Barham be sent to the Far East from the Mediterranean, followed by four Revenge-class battleships that were refitting at home and in the United States; Barham was sunk by a German U-boat in November 1941. Three weeks later the remaining two battleships at Alexandria, HMS Queen Elizabeth and Valiant were seriously damaged by Italian human torpedoes. While no more destroyers or cruisers were available, the Admiralty decided that an aircraft carrier, the small HMS Eagle could be sent.

Winston Churchill, the Prime Minister, noted that since the German battleship Tirpitz was tying up a superior British fleet, a small British fleet at Singapore might have a similar disproportionate effect on the Japanese. The Foreign Office expressed the opinion that the presence of modern battleships at Singapore might deter Japan from entering the war. In October 1941, the Admiralty ordered HMS Prince of Wales to depart for Singapore, where it would be joined by HMS Repulse. The carrier HMS Indomitable was to join them but it ran aground off Jamaica on 3 November and no other carrier was available.

In August 1940, the Chiefs of Staff Committee reported that the force necessary to hold Malaya and Singapore in the absence of a fleet was 336 first-line aircraft and a garrison of nine brigades. Churchill assured the prime ministers of Australia and New Zealand that, if they were attacked, their defence would be a priority second only to that of the British Isles. A defence conference was held in Singapore in October 1940 with representatives from all three services, including Vice-Admiral Sir Geoffrey Layton (Commander in Chief, China Station), the General Officer Commanding Malaya Command, Lieutenant General Lionel Bond and Air Officer Commanding the RAF in the Far East, Air Marshal John Babington. Australia was represented by its three deputy service chiefs, Captain Joseph Burnett, Major General John Northcott and Air Commodore William Bostock. Over ten days, they discussed the situation in the Far East. They estimated that the air defence of Burma and Malaya would require a minimum of 582 aircraft. By 7 December 1941, there were only 164 first-line aircraft in Malaya and Singapore and the fighters were obsolete Brewster F2A Buffaloes. There were only 31 battalions of infantry of the 48 required and instead of two tank regiments, there were no tanks. Many of the units were poorly trained and equipped; during 1941 Britain had sent 676 aircraft and 446 tanks to the Soviet Union.

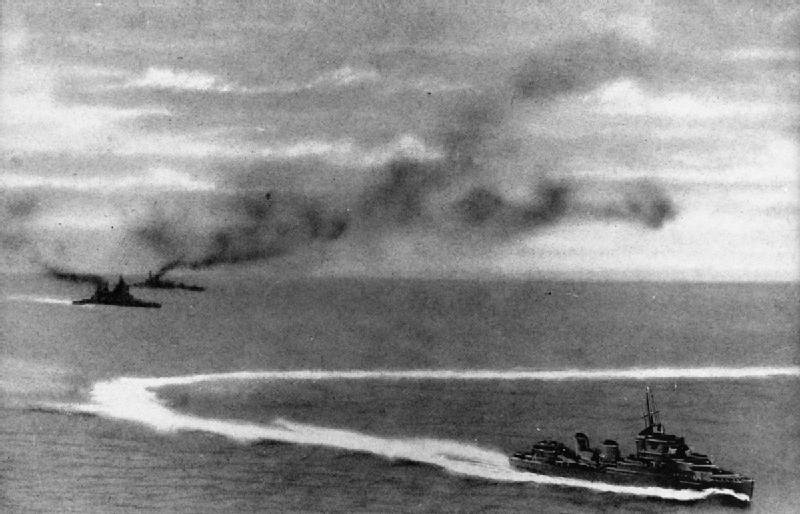
HMS Prince of Wales (left, front) and Repulse (left, behind) after being hit by torpedoes on 10 December 1941. A destroyer, HMS Express, is manoeuvring in the foreground.

The Japanese were aware of the state of the Singapore defences. There were spies in Singapore, such as Captain Patrick Heenan and a copy of the Chiefs of Staff's August 1940 appreciation was among the secret documents captured by the German surface raider Atlantis from the SS Automedon on 11 November 1940. The report was given to the Japanese and the detailed knowledge of Singapore's defences may have encouraged the Japanese to attack. On 8 December 1941, the Japanese occupied the Shanghai International Settlement. A couple of hours later, landings began at Kota Bharu in Malaya. An hour after that, the Imperial Japanese Navy began the Attack on Pearl Harbor. On 10 December, Prince of Wales and Repulse, sailing to meet the Malaya invasion force, were sunk by Japanese aircraft. After the disastrous Malayan Campaign, Singapore surrendered on 15 February 1942. During the final stages of the campaign, the 15-inch and 9.2-inch guns had bombarded targets at Johor Bahru, RAF Tengah and Bukit Timah.

== Aftermath ==
=== Fall of Singapore ===
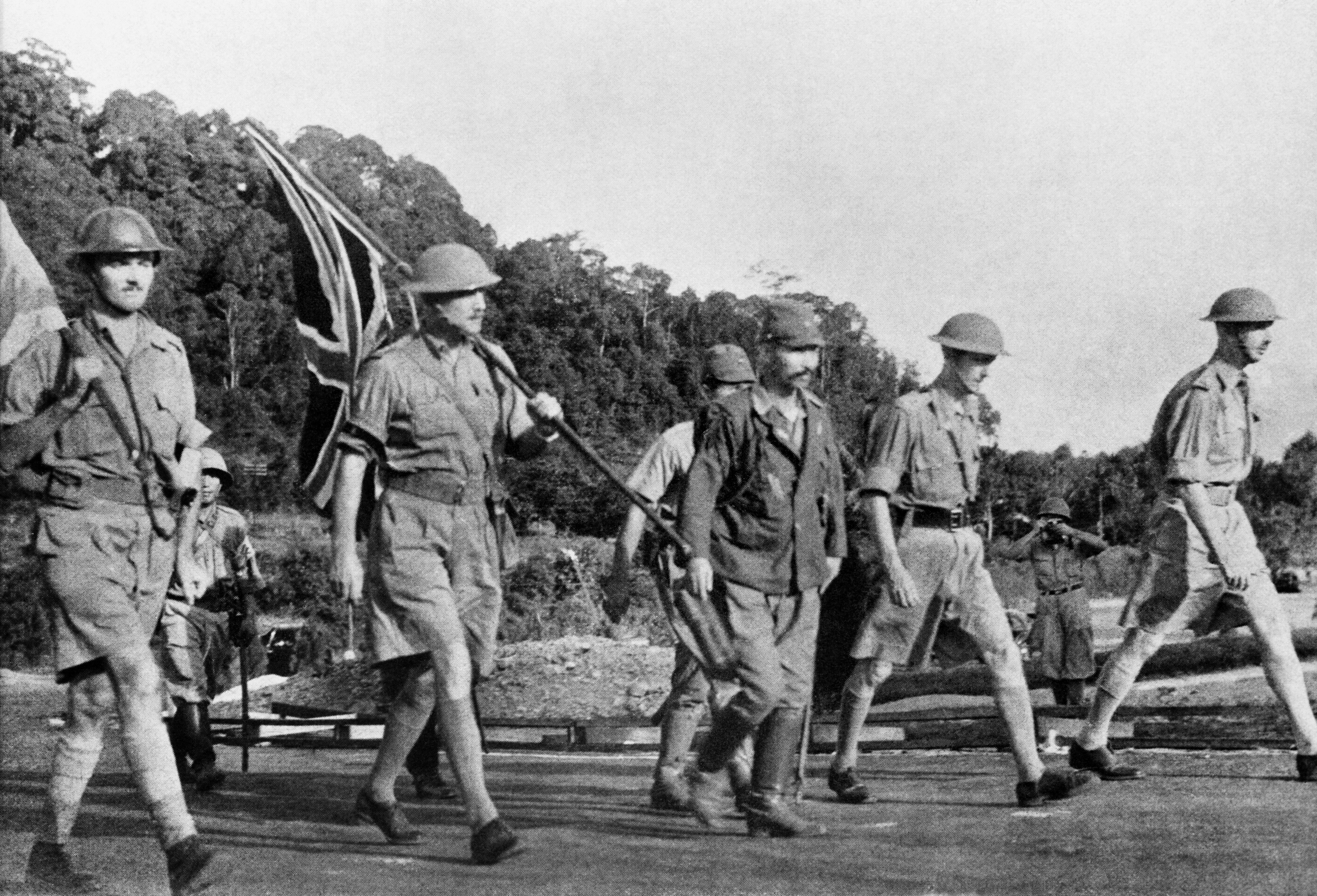
Lieutenant General Arthur Percival (right) goes to negotiate the capitulation of Allied forces in Singapore on 15 February 1942; the Japanese officer in the centre is Lieutenant Colonel Ichiji Sugita.

The fall of Singapore was described by Winston Churchill as "the worst disaster and largest capitulation in British history". It was a profound blow to the prestige and morale of the British Empire. The promised fleet had not been sent and the fortress that had been declared "impregnable" had been quickly captured. Nearly 139,000 troops were lost, of whom about 130,000 were captured. The 38,000 British casualties included most of the 18th Infantry Division, which had been ordered to Malaya in January. There were also 18,000 Australian casualties, including most of the 8th Australian Division, and 14,000 local troops. The majority of the defenders—some 67,000 of them—were from British India. About 40,000 of the Indian prisoners of war joined the Japanese-sponsored Indian National Army.

Richmond, in a 1942 article in The Fortnightly Review, charged that the loss of Singapore illustrated "the folly of not providing adequately for the command of the sea in a two-ocean war". He argued that the Singapore strategy had been unrealistic. Privately he blamed politicians who had allowed Britain's sea power to be run down. The resources provided for the defence of Malaya were inadequate to hold Singapore and the manner in which those resources were employed was frequently wasteful, inefficient and ineffective.

The disaster had political and military dimensions. In Parliament, Churchill suggested that an official inquiry into the disaster should be held after the war. When this wartime speech was published in 1946, the Australian government asked if the British government still intended to conduct the inquiry. The Joint Planning Staff considered the matter and recommended that no inquiry be held, as it would not be possible to restrict its focus to the events surrounding the fall of Singapore and it would inevitably have to examine the political, diplomatic and military circumstances of the Singapore strategy over a period of many years. The new Prime Minister Clement Attlee accepted this advice and no inquiry was ever held.

In Australia and New Zealand, after years of assurances, there was a sense of betrayal. The Singapore Strategy had permitted Australia to accept sending the Second Australian Imperial Force, its newest ships, and thousands of airmen to aid Britain. The loss of almost a quarter of Australia's overseas soldiers—the equivalent of 100,000 soldiers for Britain or 300,000 for the United States—stunned the country. According to one historian, "In the end, no matter how you cut it, the British let them down". The defeat affected politics for decades. In a speech in the Australian House of Representatives in 1992, Prime Minister Paul Keating cited the sense of betrayal,

I was told that I did not learn respect at school. I learned one thing: I learned about self-respect and self-regard for Australia—not about some cultural cringe to a country which decided not to defend the Malayan peninsula, not to worry about Singapore and not to give us our troops back to keep ourselves free from Japanese domination. This was the country that you people wedded yourself to, and even as it walked out on you and joined the Common Market, you were still looking for your MBEs and your knighthoods, and all the rest of the regalia that comes with it.

A fleet was necessary for the defeat of Japan and eventually a sizeable one, the British Pacific Fleet, did go to the Far East, where it fought alongside the United States Pacific Fleet. The closer relations that developed between the two navies prior to the outbreak of war with Japan and the alliance that developed from it afterwards, became the most positive and strategic legacy of the Singapore strategy.

The Singapore Naval Base suffered little damage in the fighting and became the most important Japanese naval base outside of the home islands. The 15-inch guns were sabotaged by the British before the fall of Singapore and four of them were deemed beyond repair and scrapped by the Japanese. The floating dry dock had been scuttled by the British but was refloated by the Japanese. It was damaged beyond repair by a raid by Boeing B-29 Superfortresses in February 1945 and ultimately towed out to sea and sunk in 1946. The Royal Navy retook possession of the Singapore base in 1945.

=== Operation Mastodon ===
In 1958, the Singapore strategy was revived in the form of Operation Mastodon, a plan to deploy V bombers of RAF Bomber Command equipped with nuclear weapons to Singapore as part of Britain's contribution to the defence of the region under Southeast Asia Treaty Organization (SEATO). As the V bombers could not fly all the way to Singapore, a new staging base was developed at RAF Gan in the Maldives. RAF Tengah's runway was too short for V bombers, so RAF Butterworth had to be used until it could be lengthened. The basing of nuclear armed aircraft and the storage of nuclear weapons without consultation with the local authorities soon ran into political complications.

Mastodon called for the deployment of two squadrons of eight Handley Page Victors to Tengah and one of eight Avro Vulcans to Butterworth. The British nuclear stockpile consisted of only 53 nuclear weapons in 1958, most of which were of the old Blue Danube type but plans called for 48 of the new, lighter Red Beard tactical nuclear weapons to be stored at Tengah when they became available, two for each V bomber. Up to 48 Red Beards were secretly stowed at RAF Tengah, between 1962 and 1971.

The Royal Navy deployed the aircraft carrier HMS Victorious with Red Beards and nuclear-capable Supermarine Scimitars to the Far East in 1960. As with the original Singapore strategy, there were doubts as to whether 24 V bombers could be spared in the event of a crisis dire enough to require them, especially after China's acquisition of nuclear weapons in 1964. During the Indonesia–Malaysia confrontation in 1963, Bomber Command sent detachments of Victors and Vulcans to the Far East. Over the next three years, four V bombers were permanently stationed there, with squadrons in the United Kingdom rotating detachments. In April 1965, 33 Squadron carried out a rapid deployment of its eight Vulcans to RAAF Butterworth and RAF Tengah. Air Chief Marshal Sir John Grandy reported that the V bombers "provided a valuable deterrent to confrontation being conducted on a large scale".

In 1965, racial, political and personal tensions led to Singapore seceding from Malaysia and becoming an independent country. With the end of the confrontation, the last V bombers were withdrawn in 1966. The following year, the British government announced its intention to withdraw its forces from East of Suez. The Singapore Naval Base was handed over to the government of Singapore on 8 December 1968 and Sembawang Shipyard became the basis of a ship repair industry. The Red Beards were returned to the UK via the US in 1971.

== See also ==
- Singapore Naval Base
- War Plan Orange
