= HMS Terror =

The most well-known HMS Terror (1813) took part in James Clark Ross's expedition to Antarctica from 1839 to 1843, and John Franklin's lost expedition in 1845, both with her sister ship HMS Erebus. She was originally a 10-gun bomb vessel launched in 1813 and converted to a discovery vessel in 1836. She was involved in the bombardment of Fort McHenry in the War of 1812. The two ships were converted to screw propulsion in 1844 in preparation for their second polar expedition, where they became trapped in ice near King William Island and were abandoned in 1848.

Eight other ships of the Royal Navy have borne the name HMS Terror:

- HMS Terror (1696) was a 4-gun bomb vessel launched in 1696, and captured and burnt by the French in 1704.
- HMS Terror (1741) was a 14-gun bomb vessel launched in 1741 and sold in 1754.
- HMS Terror (1759) was an 8-gun bomb ketch launched in 1759 for the British Royal Navy that it sold in 1774. New owners renamed her Union. She made two voyages as a Greenland whaler before becoming a London-based transport. She remained a transport until she was lost on 20 May 1782 off the Malabar coast of India.
- HMS Terror (1779) was an 8-gun bomb vessel launched in 1779 and sold in 1812.
- HMS Terror (1794) was a 4-gun gunboat, formerly a Dutch hoy. She was purchased in 1794 and sold in 1804.
- HMS Terror (1856) was a 16-gun iron screw floating battery launched in 1856. She became the base ship at Bermuda in 1857 and was sold in 1902.
- HMS Terror was previously the iron screw troopship HMS Malabar. She was launched in 1866, became a base ship in 1897 and was renamed Terror in 1901. She was put up for sale in 1914 and was sold in 1918.
- HMS Terror (I03) was an Erebus-class monitor launched in 1916. She was sunk in an air attack in 1941.

Shore establishment:

- HMS Terror (from 1945 to 1971) was also the name of the Royal Navy barracks next to Singapore Naval Base in Sembawang, Singapore.

== Other British military vessels named Terror ==
- Terror was a gunboat that the garrison at Gibraltar launched in June 1782 during the Great Siege of Gibraltar. She was one of 12. Each was armed with an 18-pounder gun, and received a crew of 21 men drawn from Royal Navy vessels stationed at Gibraltar. Porcupine provided Terror's crew.
