= HMS Trafalgar (D77) =

Battle-class destroyer

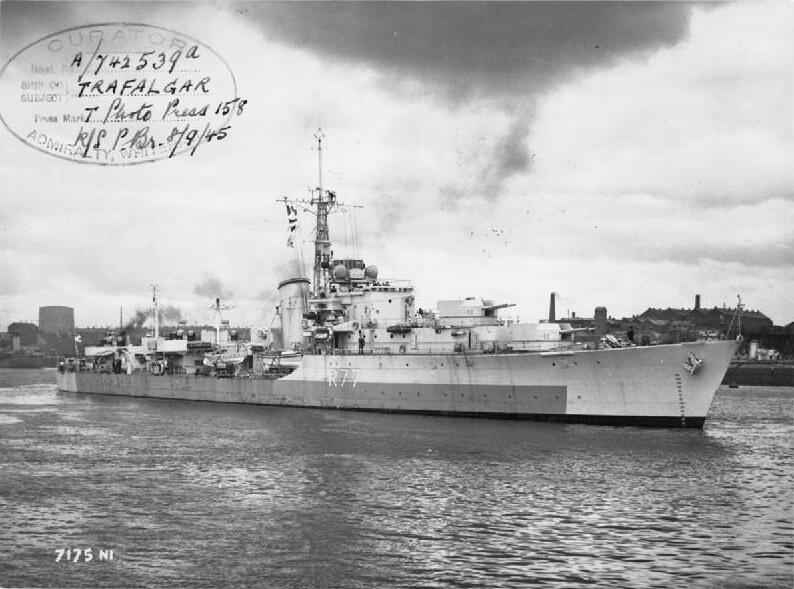

History

United Kingdom
- Name: HMS Trafalgar
- Builder: Swan Hunter
- Laid down: 1943
- Launched: 12 January 1944
- Commissioned: 23 July 1945
- Decommissioned: 1963
- Identification: Pennant number: D77
- Fate: Laid up in reserve at Portsmouth. Scrapped at Dalmuir in 1971

General characteristics
- Class & type: Battle-class destroyer
- Displacement: 2,325 tons
- Length: 379 ft (116 m)
- Beam: 40.25 ft (12.27 m)
- Armament: 2 × twin 4.5 in guns QF Mark III on mounting BD Mk. IV; 1 × single QF 4 inch naval gun Mk XXIII on mount Mk. III; 4 × twin 40 mm Bofors mounts "Hazemeyer" Mk. IV; 4-6 × single 40 mm Bofors mounts Mk. VII; 2 × quad tubes for 21 inch (533 mm) torpedoes Mk. IX; Two depth charge rails.; Four depth charge throwers.; depth charges later replaced by 1 × Squid A/S mortar]]

HMS Trafalgar was a Battle-class destroyer of the Royal Navy (RN). She was named after the Battle of Trafalgar, a decisive British victory over a Franco-Spanish Fleet in 1805. Trafalgar was built by Swan Hunter on the Tyne. She was launched on 12 January 1944 and commissioned on 23 July 1945.

== Royal Navy service ==
In August 1945, Trafalgar commanded by Captain Anthony F Pugsley deployed to the Far East via the Mediterranean as part of the 19th Destroyer Flotilla, which consisted of her sister ships, and which performed a variety of duties in that region while based there. It was a brief stay however, for just the following year, the destroyer, along with the rest of the 19th Flotilla, returned to the UK via the Mediterranean. Upon returning home to the UK, Trafalgar was placed in reserve, an occurrence quite familiar to her sister ships during the 1950s. In 1953, while still in reserve, she took part in the Fleet Review to celebrate the Coronation of Queen Elizabeth II.

In 1958, Trafalgar emerged from a refit, was commissioned and became the leader of the 7th Destroyer Squadron, having spells with the Home and Mediterranean Fleets. Just prior to her return to the UK in 1961 she was accidentally rammed by her sister-ship Solebay, Captain(D) 1st Destroyer Squadron, thus delaying her return to the UK. In 1962, Trafalgar along with ships of the squadron, sailed for the Mediterranean for the last time, performing a number of naval exercises, as well as fly-the-flag visits.

== Decommissioning and disposal ==
Trafalgar, with the rest of the 7th Destroyer Squadron, finally returned to the UK in 1963 where she was decommissioned, and subsequently placed in Reserve at HMNB Portsmouth Dockyard. She was eventually broken up for scrap at Dalmuir arriving there on 8 June 1970.

== Publications ==
- Colledge, J. J.; Warlow, Ben (2006) [1969]. Ships of the Royal Navy: The Complete Record of All Fighting Ships of the Royal Navy from the 15th Century to the Present (3rd Rev ed.). London: Chatham Publishing. ISBN 978-1-86176-281-8. OCLC 67375475.
- Hodges, Peter (1971). Battle Class Destroyers. London: Almark Publishing. ISBN 0-85524-012-1.
