= HMS Lagos =

Battle-class destroyer

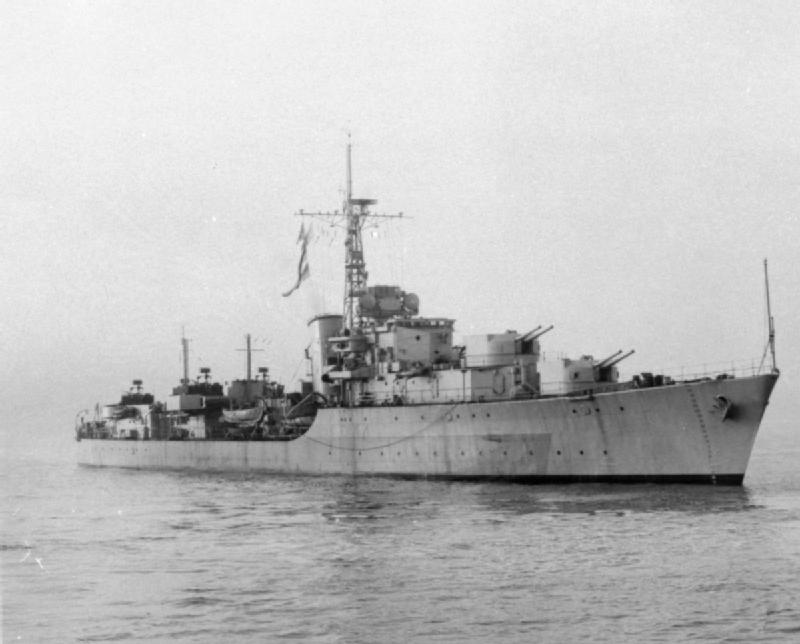

History

United Kingdom
- Name: Lagos
- Laid down: 8 April 1943
- Launched: 4 August 1944
- Commissioned: 2 November 1945
- Decommissioned: 1960
- Identification: Pennant number R44/D44
- Fate: Scrapped 1967

General characteristics
- Class & type: Battle-class destroyer
- Displacement: 2,325 tons standard; 3,430 tons full load
- Length: 379 ft (116 m)
- Beam: 40 ft (12 m)
- Draught: 5.3 ft (1.6 m)
- Propulsion: 2 steam turbines, 2 shafts, 2 boilers, 50,000 shp (37 MW)
- Speed: 35.75 knots (66.21 km/h)
- Range: 4,400 nautical miles (8,100 km) at 12 knots (22 km/h)
- Complement: 268
- Armament: 2 × dual 4.5-inch (114 mm) gun; 1 × single 4-inch (102 mm) gun; 14 × Bofors 40 mm gun; 10 × 21 inch (533 mm) torpedo tubes; 1 × Squid mortar

HMS Lagos was a Battle-class destroyer of the Royal Navy. She was named in honour of the Battle of Lagos which happened in 1759 off the coast of Portugal, between the Royal Navy and a French fleet, resulting in a British victory.

== History ==
Lagos was built by Cammell Laird of Birkenhead. She was one of ten Battle-class destroyers ordered under the 1942 naval estimates. She was launched on 4 August 1944 and commissioned on 2 November 1945. Her pennant number was originally 'R44', which was later (post-1948) changed to 'D44' when the Royal Navy rationalised the numbering system.

== Deployment ==
Lagos in 1946 with her original pennant number.

=== Post World War II ===
In 1946, after the end of hostilities, Lagos deployed to the Far East with the 19th Destroyer Flotilla to join the British Pacific Fleet. Her journey included stops at various ports, such as for example, Port Said (March), Colombo, Singapore, Hong Kong (May), Shanghai (June), before finally reaching Japan in July 1946.

After visiting Japan Lagos, along with the rest of the Flotilla, began the journey home to the UK, once again visiting many ports on fly-the-flag visits, mainly in Malaya. Upon returning to the UK in early 1947, Lagos was placed in Reserve.

In 1957, Lagos joined the 1st Destroyer Squadron, seeing service with the Home and Mediterranean Fleets. The following year, Lagos, with the rest of the squadron, joined the Far East Fleet. In 1959, following the collision between sister ship Hogue and the Indian cruiser Mysore, Lagos and the destroyer Solebay, towed Hogue to Singapore.

== Decommissioning ==
In 1960, Lagos was decommissioned, being scrapped at Bo'ness in 1967.

== Publications ==
- Colledge, J. J.; Warlow, Ben (2006) [1969]. Ships of the Royal Navy: The Complete Record of All Fighting Ships of the Royal Navy from the 15th Century to the Present (3rd Rev ed.). London: Chatham Publishing. ISBN 978-1-86176-281-8. OCLC 67375475.
