= Tony Pugsley =

Royal Navy Rear Admiral (1901-1990)

Rear-Admiral Tony Pugsley CB DSO**
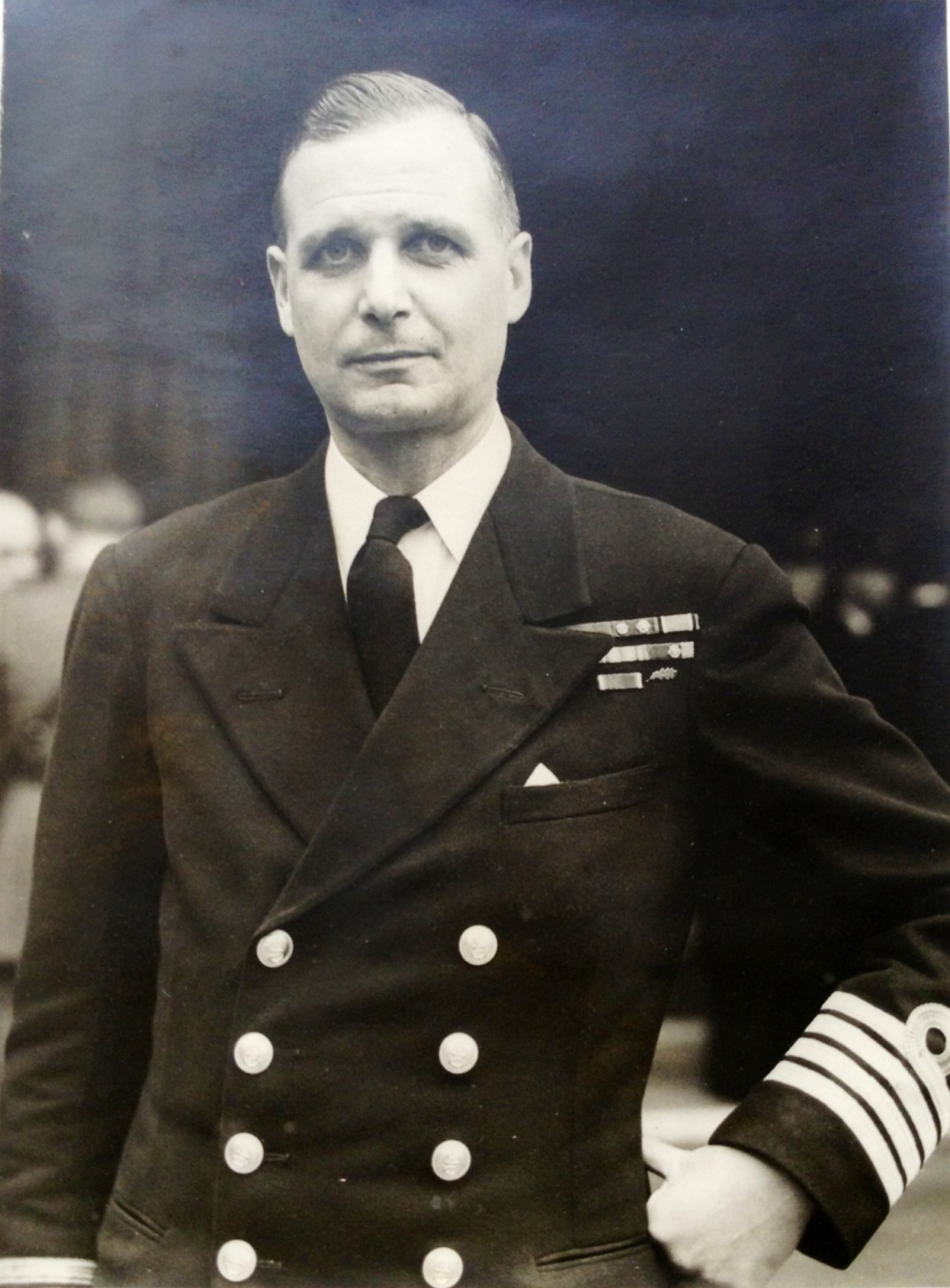
- Captain Anthony Pugsley c.1945
- Born: 7 December 1901
- Died: 17 July 1990 (aged 88)
- Military career
- Allegiance: United Kingdom
- Branch: Royal Navy
- Service years: 1915–1954
- Rank: Rear-Admiral
- Commands: Flag Officer Malayan Area; HMS Warrior; HMS Sea Eagle; 19th Destroyer Flotilla; HMS Trafalgar; 14th Destroyer Flotilla; HMS Jervis; HMS Paladin; HMS Fearless; HMS Javelin; HMS Westcott; HMS Antelope
- Conflicts: Second World War: Norwegian Campaign; Evacuation of Dunkirk; Battle of the Atlantic; Operation Grog; Operation Tiger; Malta Convoys; Operation Substance; Indian Ocean Raid; Operation Ironclad; Malta Convoys; Operation Vigorous; Battle of the Mediterranean; Normandy landings; Battle of the Scheldt; Operation Infatuate
- Awards: Companion of the Order of the Bath; Distinguished Service Order & Two Bars; Mentioned in Despatches (3); War Cross (Greece)

Rear-Admiral Anthony Follett Pugsley CB DSO** (7 December 1901 – 17 July 1990) was a British naval officer. During the Second World War he served as a successful destroyer captain, landed the 3rd Canadian Division on D-Day, and planned and executed the amphibious landings on Walcheren during a critically important phase in the Battle of the Scheldt in late 1944.

== Early life and family ==
Tony Pugsley was born on 7 December 1901, the son of a solicitor, John Follett Pugsley, and Lucy Melton Chorley Loveband. Both his parents came from Devonshire families; his grandfather, who had qualified but never practised as a doctor, lived at Wiveliscombe, and his mother’s family were gentry originally from Yarnscombe in north-west Devon. Pugsley was descended both from Josiah Follett, the non-conformist preacher of the 18th Century, and William Pugsley who as a midshipman survived the sinking of the Royal George when she capsized at Spithead in 1782.

Pugsley was educated for two terms at Blundell's School in Tiverton, the fifth successive generation of Pugsleys to go there, before joining the Navy as a cadet, aged 13, and going to the Royal Naval College, Osborne, and thence to the Royal Naval College Dartmouth. He joined HMS Warspite as a midshipman in time to witness the surrender of the German High-Seas Fleet to the British Grand Fleet in November 1918.

In 1931 Pugsley married Barbara Byam Shaw, the daughter of the pre-Raphaelite artist John Byam Liston Shaw (Byam Shaw) and Caroline Evelyn Eunice Pyke-Nott.

== Early career ==
His early experiences as second-in-command of the gunboat HMS Widgeon on the river Yangtze from 1925 to 1927 are recorded in Pugsley’s memoirs, Destroyer Man. At a particularly dangerous and lawless time in Chinese history, the upper Yangtze was ruled by warlords. An uneasy peace was kept by a British naval presence, and when one of the warlords held a number of British merchant seamen hostage, Pugsley received his first opportunity to distinguish himself in aiding in their rescue. On another occasion he prevented a Chinese mob from overrunning a British cantonment by leading a guard of four sailors with unloaded rifles, he himself armed only with a service cane, towards the mob which parted and melted away

== HMS Javelin ==
At the outbreak of the Second World War, Pugsley, by now a commander, was captain of the destroyer HMS Javelin, and was mentioned in despatches for his ship’s defence against enemy aircraft in the Norwegian Campaign.

Javelin was also at the Evacuation of Dunkirk, where she evacuated some 1,400 troops before being withdrawn to form part of a special anti-invasion force.

After Dunkirk, Javelin was ordered to join Captain Lord Louis Mountbatten’s Fifth Destroyer Flotilla at Immingham. The flotilla was a force of J- and K-class destroyers, commanded by Mountbatten from, variously, his ship HMS Kelly, and (when Kelly was under repair as she often was) the County Hotel at Immingham.

As Javelin was the sole possessor in the flotilla of a radar set, Mountbatten often selected Javelin to be his temporary flotilla leader. On the night of 24 November 1940, the flotilla was at sea sweeping off the South Devon and Cornish coast. Mountbatten was Captain D (as the officer commanding the flotilla), and was embarked on board Javelin. As the Daily Telegraph put it, "whatever Mountbatten’s attributes in other fields, at sea he was regarded by Pugsley and others as an accident-prone Jonah". This view was backed by much circumstantial evidence. The Kelly, Mountbatten’s famous ship, had an astonishing number of misfortunes under his command, not all of them through enemy action. Pugsley in his memoirs remarks that Mountbatten was otherwise an administrator of brilliant efficiency, and above all a man of great and sincere charm.

In a disastrous night-encounter with three German destroyers, Mountbatten over-ruled Pugsley’s advice which was typically forthright. When the destroyers were sighted, Pugsley said to Mountbatten "Straight on at ‘em, I presume, sir?". Mountbatten replied "No, no. We must turn [to port] to a parallel course at once or they will get away from us". Mountbatten wanted to ensure that the German destroyers, which had several knots extra at their disposal, did not escape. He accordingly wished to turn the British flotilla to a course that would not allow them to get away. Pugsley was keen to get into action and bring his forward guns to bear as quickly as possible, in order to smother the enemy. With ranges almost point-blank, the first few salvoes could have been decisive. The turn to port ordered by Mountbatten was disastrous, offering the Germans a ready target. Javelin was hit by two German torpedoes as she came onto a course parallel to that of the Germans’. Of the original 353 feet of Javelin, only 155 feet remained. Three officers (Surgeon-Lieutenant Sloan RNVR, Sub-Lieutenant Mitchell, and Midshipman Fitzgerald) and forty-three sailors (including Pugsley’s steward, Leading Steward Little whose loss Pugsley felt deeply) were killed.

The German flotilla made good its escape. Javelin meanwhile was towed by tug over the course of the next 36 hours to Plymouth. Pugsley was again mentioned in dispatches.

== HMS Fearless and HMS Paladin ==
Javelin being under heavy reconstruction, Pugsley shortly afterwards took command of HMS Fearless, at Troon, within a flotilla commanded by Captain Guy Grantham, and proceeded to Gibraltar on convoy duty. At Gibraltar, Fearless was ordered to join Force H, under Vice-Admiral Sir James Somerville, responsible for the Western half of the Mediterranean. Over the next few months HMS Fearless was in the Mediterranean, involved in convoy duties to re-supply Malta and the bombardment of Genoa, trying to avoid the Italian air-force’s (and on occasion the Luftwaffe’s) attentions. In June 1941 Fearless shared the credit for the sinking of the German submarine U-138. Fearless was sunk by aircraft attack on 23 July 1941 during Operation Substance. Pugsley, again mentioned in dispatches, returned home, and, in October 1941, was appointed to command HMS Paladin, a brand-new destroyer being built by John Brown & Company at their shipyard on the River Clyde. Paladin sailed on 7 December 1941, and Pugsley took her on her first deployment, escort duty to Ceylon. In April 1942, while in the Indian Ocean, Paladin rescued the captain, officers and ship's company of the heavy cruiser HMS Dorsetshire, and was involved in Operation Ironclad, the capture of Diego Suarez, Madagascar, from Vichy French forces (earning Paladin her first battle honours). Paladin then returned to the Mediterranean, via India and Mauritius, and joined Rear-Admiral Philip Vian’s force of some eight cruisers and twenty-six destroyers (plus the old battleship HMS Centurion, now a radio-controlled target-ship), in order to force passage through the infamous "bomb alley", the term given to the westward route from Alexandria to Malta. The attempt (known as Operation Vigorous) failed, in the face of determined and sustained attack by the Luftwaffe and Italian air-force, and Vian’s force retired to Alexandria with a number of ships sunk or put out of action. The relief of Malta by the British was as a result thwarted until after El Alamein. Pugsley was awarded the DSO for his exploits while in command of Paladin.

== HMS Jervis and 14th Destroyer Flotilla ==
On New Year’s Eve 1942, Pugsley was promoted to captain, and to command of the 14th Destroyer Flotilla in HMS Jervis. He subsequently was appointed to command all the fleet destroyers in the Eastern Mediterranean. Throughout the early part of 1943, his flotilla harried Axis shipping and engaged Italian naval surface ships. Following the highly successful destruction of an Axis convoy off Sicily, he was awarded a Bar to his DSO and the Greek War Cross.

== D-Day and Captain Patrols Channel ==
In mid-July 1943, after four years almost continuously at sea, Pugsley was recalled to join the Combined Operations planning for D-Day at Cowes under Commodore John Hughes-Hallett. Pugsley was appointed to command one of the assault groups. Each landing force (there were originally three, two British and one American, although this was later increased to three British and two American) had a commodore or rear-admiral as naval commander and was subdivided into three assault groups each with a captain in command. Pugsley was given the frigate HMS Lawford as his headquarters ship for assault group J1, responsible for the landing operations of the 3rd Canadian Division at Juno Beach. Lawford was sunk by enemy aircraft in the early stages of the landings. The landings completed, Pugsley was awarded a second Bar to his DSO. and was appointed deputy to Admiral Vian in the British landing areas in the Channel as Captain (Patrols).

After Vian's departure, Pugsley was promoted to the command of all British naval patrols in the Channel, responsible for preventing the enemy disrupting the Allied build-up.

== Walcheren and Operation Infatuate ==
In mid-September 1944, Pugsley was given a new appointment, involving finding a solution to dislodge the Germans from the island of Walcheren. The role quickly became one of planning and commanding an amphibious operation to clear the island.

=== Background to Infatuate ===
Walcheren was the key to opening up the Scheldt estuary which would open up the strategic port of Antwerp, critical to supply the Allied armies pursuing the Germans to the Rhine. The whole impetus of the Allied advance across North-Western Europe, and into Germany, was dependent on rapid and ample supply, particularly fuel and ammunition. If Antwerp were not soon made available, the advance would be in imminent and fatal danger of being halted in its tracks.

Antwerp had been captured on 4 September but, despite strenuous efforts by Admiral Sir Bertram Ramsay (Allied Naval Commander Expeditionary Force) to concentrate Field Marshal Montgomery's (commander 21st Army Group) mind on the opening of Antwerp as a top priority, Montgomery had failed to realize its strategic importance until after the Germans had, on 17 September, succeeded in heavily mining the West Scheldt. Following the failure of Operation Market Garden, the full strategic significance of Antwerp dawned upon the Allies, with the realization that a huge mine clearance operation was needed in the Scheldt estuary in order to open it up. This could only be undertaken when the enemy had been driven from both banks of the Scheldt estuary. The northern bank, consisting of the large island of Walcheren and its causeway to the mainland, remained heavily fortified and strongly garrisoned by the Germans, with batteries sweeping the Scheldt and preventing the essential mine clearance from proceeding.

=== Planning Infatuate ===
Pugsley represented Admiral Ramsay at the HQ of General Harry Crerar, whose First Canadian Army had been entrusted with clearing the Scheldt. Pugsley soon became convinced that two combined amphibious assaults of Walcheren with simultaneous crossings of the causeway was now the only feasible way of ensuring the capture of the island. He pressed this view on Brigadier Church Mann, Crerar’s Chief of Staff. Mann was sympathetic and confirmed that General Guy Simonds, the corps commander responsible for the area, held the same view. Pugsley contacted Admiral Ramsay, who also immediately supported the idea, and authorised the planning and operational resources that Pugsley needed.

While the crucial South bank of the Scheldt, around Breskens and South Beveland, was being cleared of Germans by the First Canadian Army in sustained and fierce fighting (this would allow Walcheren to be assaulted without fear of hostile action from the rear), Pugsley and his staff planned the amphibious elements of the operation. The assault was to be a three-pronged attack, two amphibious and one land-based. The major obstacle to a landing from the sea was the massive German defences, in the form of fourteen colossal batteries commanding the whole of the sea-approaches to the Scheldt and Antwerp; to attempt any form of landing at its foot would be tantamount to suicide.

The solution was found by General Simonds who persuaded the RAF to use bombing to breach the dyke. The Dutch Government had given agonised consent to this happening, and early in October 1944 four breaches of the dyke had been achieved by the RAF. A great part of the island was flooded by the incoming tides. The amphibious landings now became feasible, and the troops for the assault, the 4th Commando Brigade based at Bruges under Brigadier Leicester, became actively involved in the planning of the operation.

Pugsley, now with his HQ at Bruges, had already been appointed naval commander of "Assault-Group Force T" by Admiral Ramsay, with Commander Jonas as his deputy, and Commanders Masterman, Dathan, and Redvers M Prior M.P. on his staff as, respectively, Staff Officer (Operations), Staff Officer (Plans), and principal Beachmaster, while Captain Colin Maud was appointed Pugsley's deputy for the simultaneous Flushing assault (Maud subsequently took on the principal Beachmaster role for the Flushing operation). The final plan, known as Operation Infatuate, involved two amphibious assaults to be launched simultaneously, one to be launched from Breskens to Flushing by 4 Commando (the one Army unit in the 4th Commando Brigade), and the other assault to be directed by the main force of 4th Commando Brigade at the beach at Westkapelle, the westernmost point of Walcheren. Westkapelle was still heavily defended and the defences had not been greatly affected by the flooding of the island. Fourteen batteries with guns ranging from 75mm up to 200mm were sited, pointing seawards, within the defences. In the days immediately before the operation, the RAF and the battleship HMS Warspite (in the last shoot of her distinguished service since Jutland), as well as the monitors HMS Erebus and HMS Roberts bombarded the defences. The RAF alone dropped 4,871 tons of bombs, and a number of the batteries were put out of action.

=== Infatuate ===
The final assembly point was at Ostend, and the operation D-day was fixed as 1 November 1944. Pugsley moved his HQ to HMS Kingsmill where he was joined by Brigadier Leicester. Eleven heavy batteries at Westkapelle were known to be still operational. Further heavy bomber raids were planned for an hour before H-hour, which had been set at 9.45 a.m., although these failed to materialise. The fighter-bomber air support to be supplied by the RAF was also cancelled because of fog in Kent, although as the force went in, rocket-firing Typhoons were called in by the RAF liaison officer aboard Kingsmill, and these succeeded in hitting a number of the German batteries. Pugsley had made the decision to proceed with the landings despite the very heavy fire to which the force was being subjected, and he ordered in the operation’s naval Support Squadron, in order to draw the fire of the defending batteries from the landing craft making the primary assault. Part of the naval Support Squadron of 27 small craft, under Commander Kenneth Sellar and Lieutenant-Commander Leefe, accordingly closed to engage the German shore-based batteries. This they did with conspicuous gallantry, and with very heavy casualties.

Soon after 10 a.m., the landings had been effected. 41, and 48 Commandos were safely ashore and were clearing enemy positions. They were joined by 47 Commando and the beach-head was established albeit supplies could not be landed until some 48 hours later.

By 12.30pm, nine of the Support Squadron's craft had been sunk, eleven put out of action, and a high percentage of their crews killed or wounded. Ultimately the Support Squadron was to be rendered hors de combat and was recalled by Pugsley, so many of the craft had been damaged or destroyed. Meanwhile, the beachhead, to which essential supplies of ammunition and food had to be transported, came under very heavy fire from German shore batteries which were no longer under attack from the Support Squadron.

=== Aftermath ===
Following the battle, Pugsley in his subsequent reports was unstinting in his praise of the heroic sacrifices made by the Support Squadron. He maintained that the landings were successful largely because of those sacrifices. In a further tribute to the bravery of the Support Squadron, Major General Sir Robert Laycock, Chief of Combined Operations, wrote to Pugsley with the following words:

I understand that the success of the landings and the comparatively light casualties sustained by No. 4 Special Service Brigade at Walcheren was due largely to the heroic efforts of the Naval Support Craft who, at great cost to themselves, effectively silenced the coastal defences.

I should like to express the appreciation of all ranks, Special Service Group, and particularly that of General Sturges and Brigadier Leicester and all ranks of No. 4 Special Service Brigade for the self-sacrifice shown by all naval personnel during the landings, which had such splendid results.

The Special Service Group sincerely hopes that they may have the privilege of co-operating again with Force T in any future amphibious operations they may be required to carry out.

By 8 November 1944, Walcheren with all its batteries had been captured and neutralized and the seaborne way to Antwerp secured, although it took more than ten squadrons of minesweepers until 26 November to clear the 80 miles of estuary and river. The importance of this victory and the supremely gallant sacrifice of the allied mariners, soldiers, and commandos involved, was made plain by the order of the German 15th Army Commander, General Gustav-Adolf von Zangen, issued on 31 October 1944, the day before the attack.

"The defence of the approaches to Antwerp represents a task which is decisive for the further conduct of the war. After overrunning the Scheldt fortifications the English would finally be in a position to land great masses of material in a large and completely protected harbour. With this material they might deliver a death blow at the North German Plateau and be at Berlin before the onset of winter. For this reason we must hold the Scheldt Fortifications to the end. The German people is watching us. In this hour the fortifications along the Scheldt occupy a role which is decisive for the future of the our people".

Pugsley, was made, albeit still a junior captain, a Companion of the Order of the Bath for his and Force T's involvement in the Walcheren operations.

== Assault-Group Force T (continued) ==
Force T continued in existence until the end of the War, undertaking smaller operations and providing the seaward defence for the Allied armies operating in the Netherlands and Germany. More notable actions in which Force T was involved included the important transfer of the First Canadian Army across the Rhine into Germany in 1945, and launching numerous minor naval and amphibious commando raids against enemy units and strongpoints along the Dutch and East German coastlines. Force T was disbanded in May 1945.

== Post-war ==
In July 1945 Pugsley was appointed to command the 19th Destroyer Flotilla in HMS Trafalgar, but the War against Japan ended before the Flotilla reached the theatre of operations. Pugsley continued in command of the 19th Destroyer Flotilla for the year following the surrender of Japan. Following an appointment on the directing staff of the Senior Officers' War Course at Greenwich, he was appointed to command of HMS Sea Eagle and became the Director of the Joint Anti-Submarine School, and then commanded the light aircraft carrier HMS Warrior. He was promoted Rear-Admiral in 1951 and was Flag-Officer Malayan Area during the Malayan Emergency, responsible for naval support to the military operations and acting as naval adviser to General Sir Gerald Templer. Pugsley retired in 1954.

== Assessment ==
The Daily Telegraph obituary of 23 July 1990 described Pugsley as having "an insatiable appetite for battle and impressive stamina; after a night on the bridge he would return to harbour, have a few gins and some lunch, and then summon his staff to discuss flotilla affairs. Pugsley played as hard as he fought – as one of his officers put it, "you had to have your drinking boots on to go ashore with the Captain" – and was forever smoking or sucking a small pipe".
