= Buona Vista Battery =

Site of former naval guns in Singapore

Coordinates: 01°19′15.35″N 103°46′17.52″E

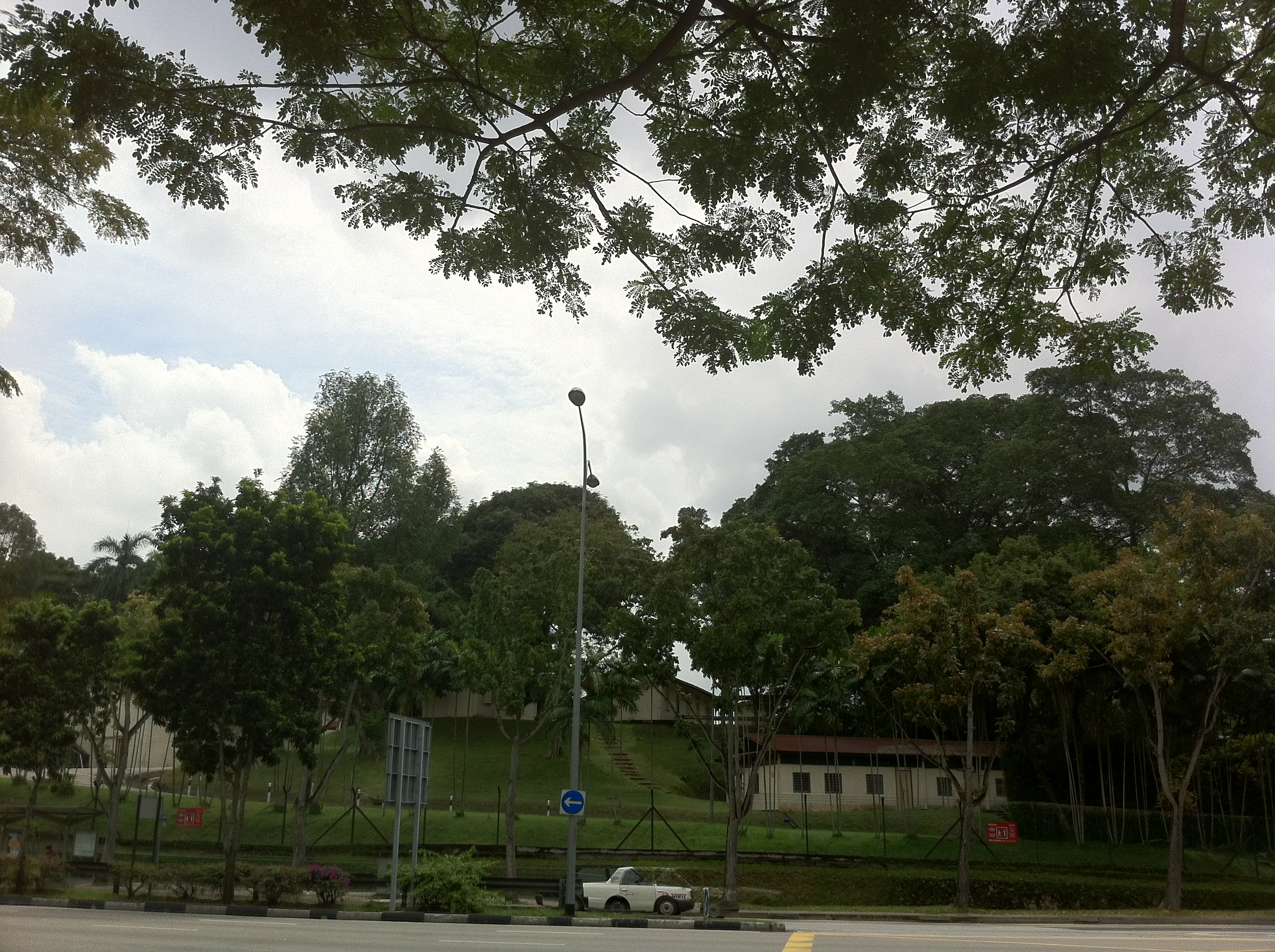
Site of the No. 1 gun

The Buona Vista Battery was the site of two 15" guns that were constructed during the late 1930s as part of the Singapore defenses.

== History ==
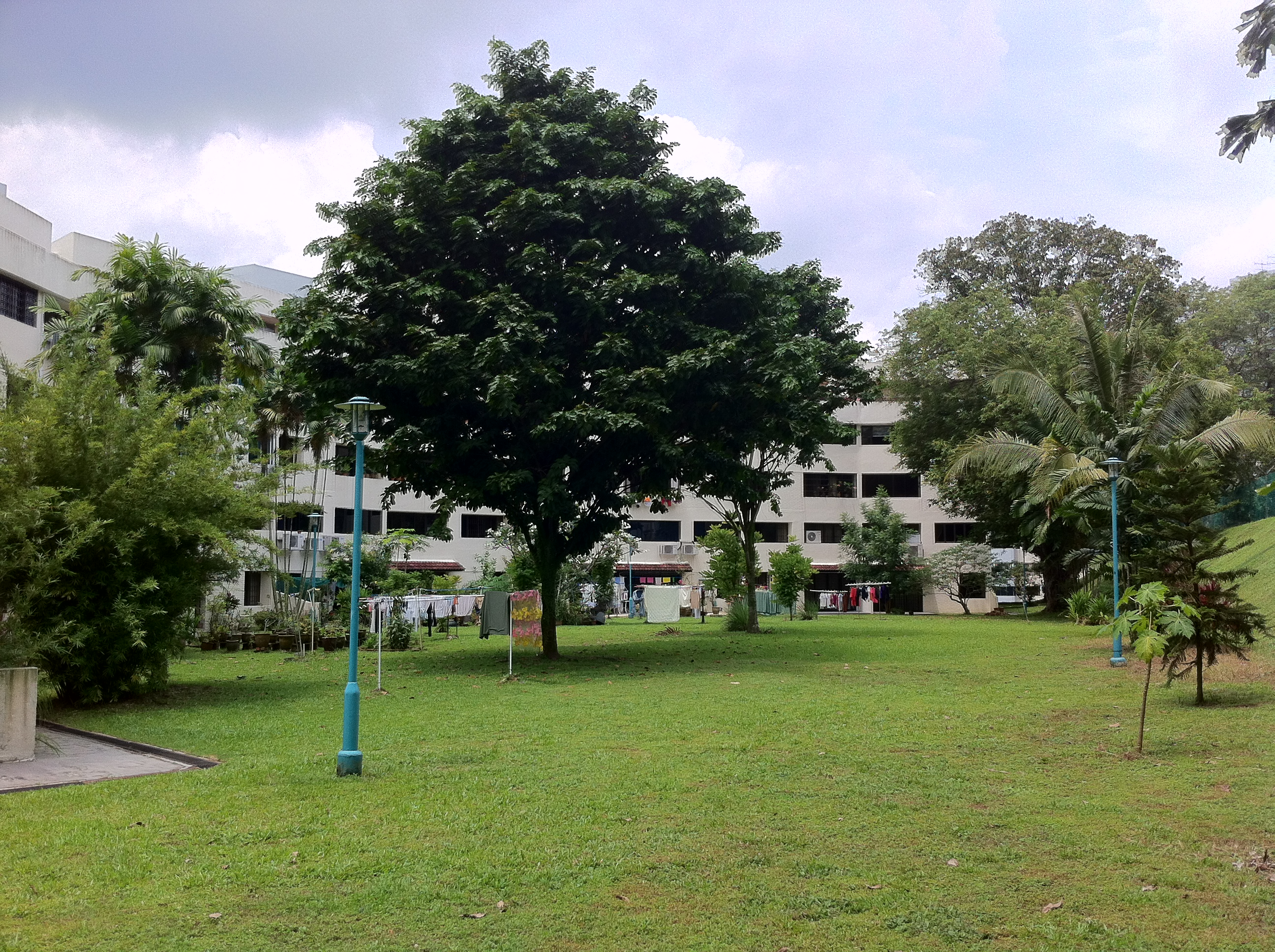
Site of the No. 2 gun

From the mid through late 1930s, the western Singapore defenses were enhanced by the addition of two 15" guns at Buona Vista, Singapore. Unlike most of the other large guns in Singapore which had a full 360 degree traverse for firing, the Buona Vista guns had a more limited angle. As a result, these guns saw no action during the Battle of Singapore and were partially destroyed by the retreating British in February 1942.

The Japanese repaired the Number 2 gun during their occupation of Singapore. Since the war, the gun sites have been completely replaced by modern construction and no visible remnants remain.
