= Toshio Kuroiwa =

Japanese World War II flying ace

- 黒岩 利雄
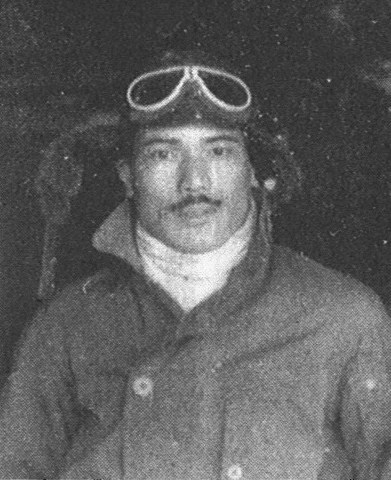
- Nanjing Air Base, 1938
- Born: December 25, 1908; Fukuoka Prefecture, Japan
- Disappeared: August 26, 1944 (aged 35); Off the Malay Peninsula
- Other name: Akudō
- Occupation: Pilot
- Military Career
- Allegiance: Japan
- Branch: Imperial Japanese Navy
- Service years: 1926–1939
- Rank: Warrant officer
- Conflicts: January 28 Incident; Second Sino-Japanese War

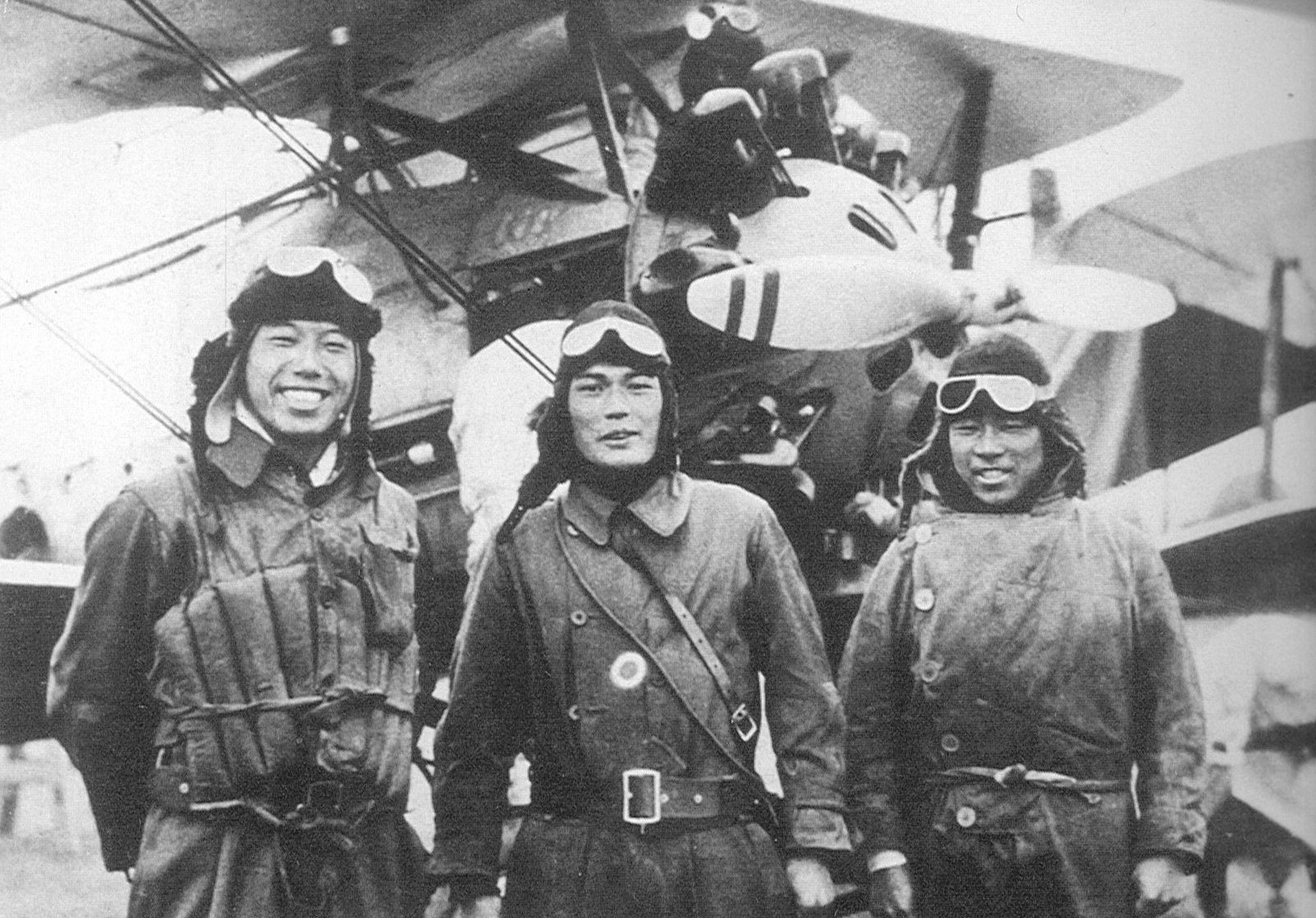
Toshio Kuroiwa (center), poses in front of a Nakajima A1N Type 3 fighter aircraft with the other two Kaga fighter pilots with which he shot down Robert Short's aircraft on 22 February 1932.

Toshio Kuroiwa (黒岩 利雄, Kuroiwa Toshio; born December 25, 1908 – disappeared August 26, 1944) was a warrant officer and ace fighter pilot in the Imperial Japanese Navy (IJN) during the January 28 Incident and the Second Sino-Japanese War. During the January 28 Incident on 22 February 1932, while assigned to the aircraft carrier Kaga's fighter group, Kuroiwa participated in the IJN's first official shootdown of an enemy aircraft in combat. In the shootdown, Kuroiwa and two other fighters from his unit destroyed a Chinese fighter aircraft piloted by American contract Pilot (Reserve) Lt Robert M. Short.

== Disappearance ==
During the Second Sino-Japanese War in 1938, assigned to the 12th Air Group, Kuroiwa saw considerable action against Chinese air opponents. During his combat career, Kuroiwa was officially credited with shooting down 13 enemy aircraft. In 1939 he was deemed too old to continue with combat duty so Kuroiwa left the IJN and became a civilian pilot for Imperial Japanese Airways. On 26 August 1944 the civilian transport aircraft he was flying disappeared off the Malay Peninsula and neither the aircraft nor Kuroiwa was ever found.

== See also ==
- List of people who disappeared
