= Robert McCawley Short =

American aviator and pilot

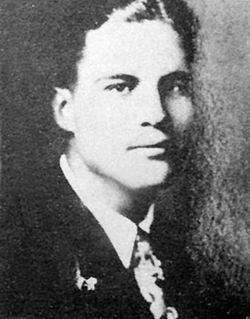
Portrait of Robert McCawley Short

Robert McCawley Short (October 4, 1904 in Steilacoom, Washington - February 22, 1932, in Suzhou, Jiangsu, China) was an American aviator, United States Army Air Forces pilot, and Republic of China Air Force Academy instructor.

== Biography ==
Born in Steilacoom, Washington, Short's family soon moved to Tacoma, Washington. After graduating from high school in 1928, Short enrolled in the United States Army Field Artillery School, where he was expelled for insubordination while in school. Afterwards, Short taught himself the remaining subjects and eventually joined the U.S. Army Air Corps, earning the rank of second lieutenant in the Air Force. Prior to coming to China, Short worked as a manager at the Pierce County Airport in Washington State, and in 1930, at the invitation of the Nationalist government, Short arrived in China to handle the Shanghai-Hangzhou mail. Upon arrival in China, however, Short turned down the job due to the poorly-equipped airplanes. Shortly afterward, he was hired by Boeing as a test pilot and instructor. In June 1931, the Chinese Aviation Department hired him as a flight instructor at the Central Aviation School.

In 1932, when the January 28 Incident broke out and the Japanese Air Force bombed Chinese civilians, Short asked to participate in the anti-Japanese military operations. On February 19, Short flew a Boeing 218 Destroyer, (an improved version of the U.S. Navy F4B-2) with US. registration X66W, from Hongqiao, Shanghai, to Nanjing. On February 20, Short flew his own Boeing to Wusongkou, where he flew into battle against three Japanese Air Force "Nakajima III" aircraft, and shot down one of them. After the battle, Short's plane was painted grass-green with Chinese Air Force graphics.

On February 22, 1932, when flying a Boeing 218 from Shanghai to Nanjing, Short was boxed by six Japanese fighters. He first shot down a Japanese fighter and killed a Japanese commander, Susumu Kotani, but later was shot down by a flight of Japanese planes led by Toshio Kuroiwa and crashed into a small lake (zh:镬底潭) of Wusong River, in Wu County, Jiangsu. He was the first foreign pilot killed in the Second Sino-Japanese War, and the first American casualty in operations against Japan, nine years before the attack on Pearl Harbor.

== Memorial ==
After the crash of the plane piloted by Short, the Chefang Township police force found the wreckage of the crashed Boeing and recovered Short's remains from the lake. The remains and wreckage of the plane were transported to Suzhou, where on February 25, 1932, the people of Suzhou laid Short's body in a cedarwood coffin, which was later converted into a bronze coffin and shipped to Shanghai. The National Government posthumously awarded Short the rank of Captain in the Air Force and telegraphed Short's family to come to China to attend Short's funeral. On April 19, Short's mother, Elizabeth Short, and brother, Edward Short, arrived in China. A total of 87 groups from the Ministry of Foreign Affairs of the National Government, the Shanghai Special Municipal Government, and the 19th Route Army were present to greet them. The funeral was held at the Universal Funeral Parlor. After the funeral meeting, four Chinese and American pilots carried the coffin, tens of thousands of Shanghai citizens came for Short's send-off. The hearse carrying Short's remains finally arrived at Hongqiao Airport's Lihong Park. On April 28, more than 10,000 people from all walks of life in Suzhou rallied at the Hangzhou Public Stadium to commemorate Short.

After Short's death, the town of Gaodian, Chefang Township, erected a 3-meter-high granite memorial column at the place of Short's martyrdom, on which the words "U.S. aviator Short's martyrdom" were engraved. Besides, Suzhou Park, built a "Short monument pavilion". After the outbreak of the War, the Japanese army destroyed all of Short's graves, memorial pillars and monument pavilions. After the victory of war in 1947, the national government brought Short's coffin from Shanghai to the Nanjing Aviation Martyrs' Cemetery for burial. The memorial column can also be rebuilt as current Short Martyrdom Monument (肖特纪念馆). In the United States, the Museum of Flight in Seattle has housed several relics and collections belonging to Short since 1932.

After the founding of the People's Republic China, the Aviation Martyrs' Cemetery was deserted for a while. In 1984, Wang Quchang (王蘧常), a professor at Fudan University, reissued a compilation of Short's deeds, which attracted the attention of Short's younger brother, Edward Short. In October of that year, Edward Short arrived in China and visited places including the monument to Short's martyrdom, and donated seven photos of Short's funeral from his collection to the office of the Wu County Political Consultative Conference. In 1985, the Aviation Martyrs' Cemetery was remodeled, and completed by 1987. In 1999, a statue of Robert Short was established in the same place. In October 2009, the Memorial moved to Jiangbin Park (江滨公园, River Shore Park) in Xietang Subdistrict of Suzhou Industrial Park.

On September 1, 2014, Ministry of Civil Affairs of the People's Republic of China listed Short as a Famous Hero Against Japanese Aggression (zh:著名抗日英烈和英雄群体名录). In 2018, Short was also honored at Stadium High School's annual Memorial Day Recognition, where he graduated from in 1925.

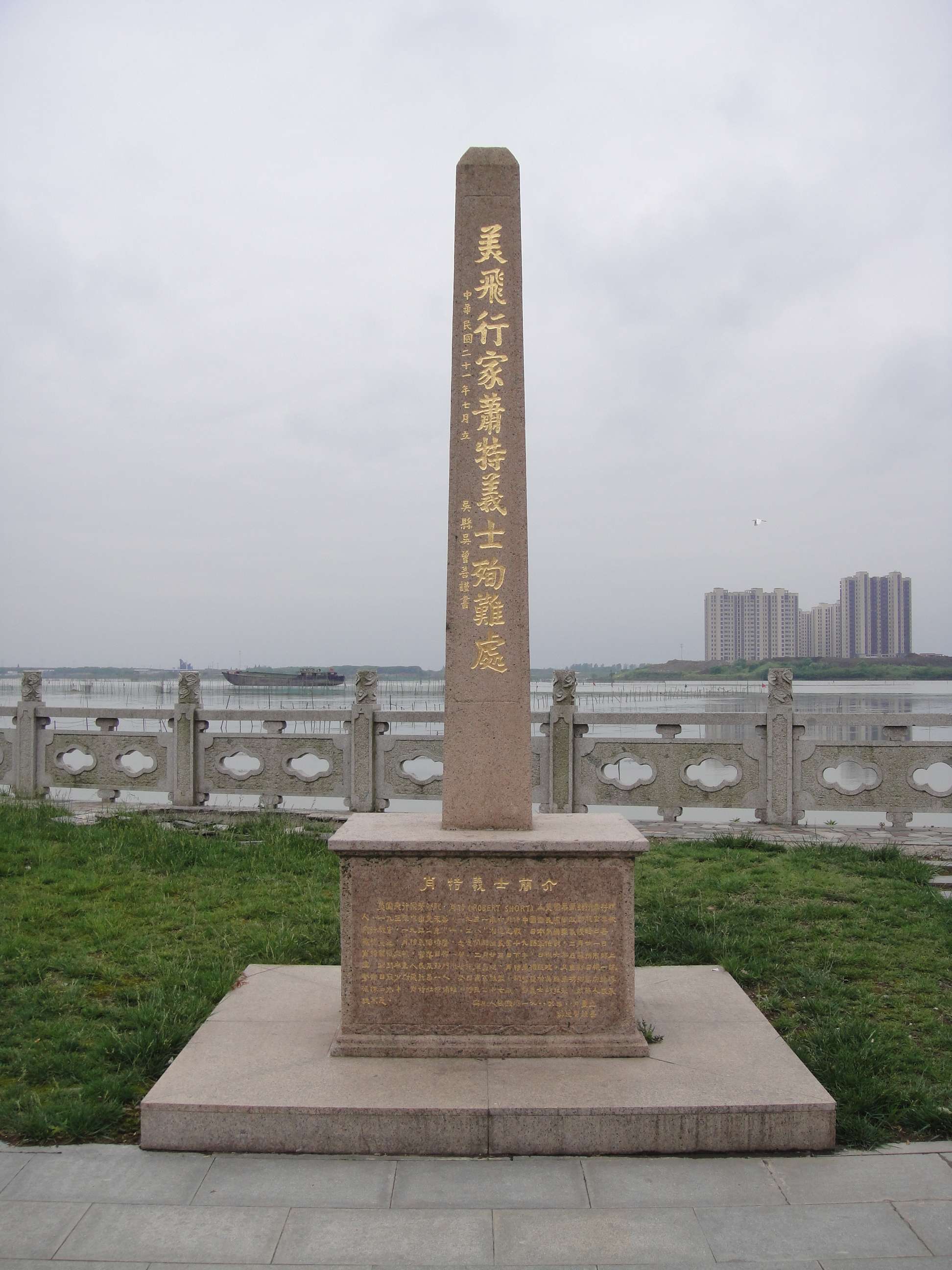
Obelisk

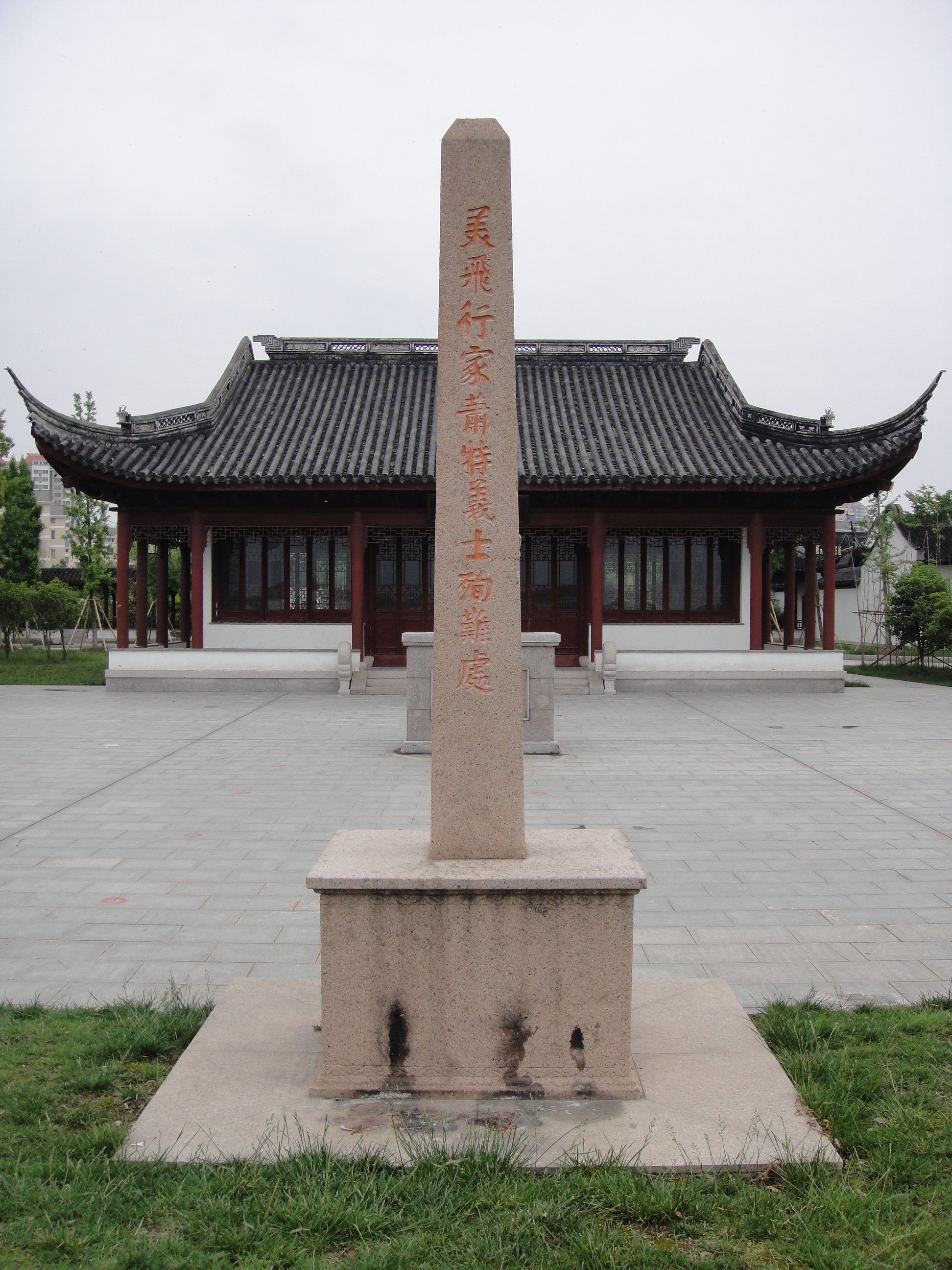
Obelisk

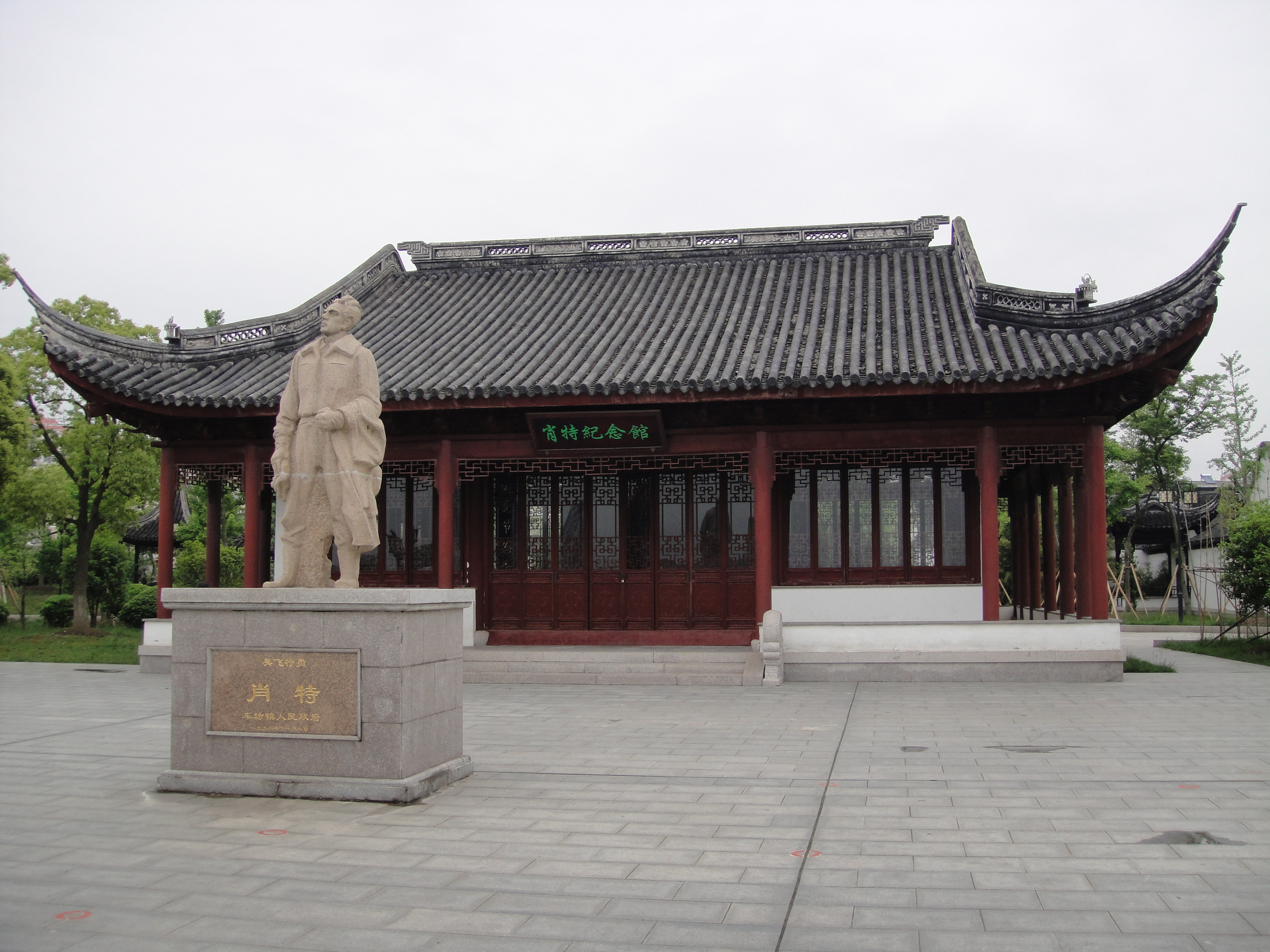
Short Memorial

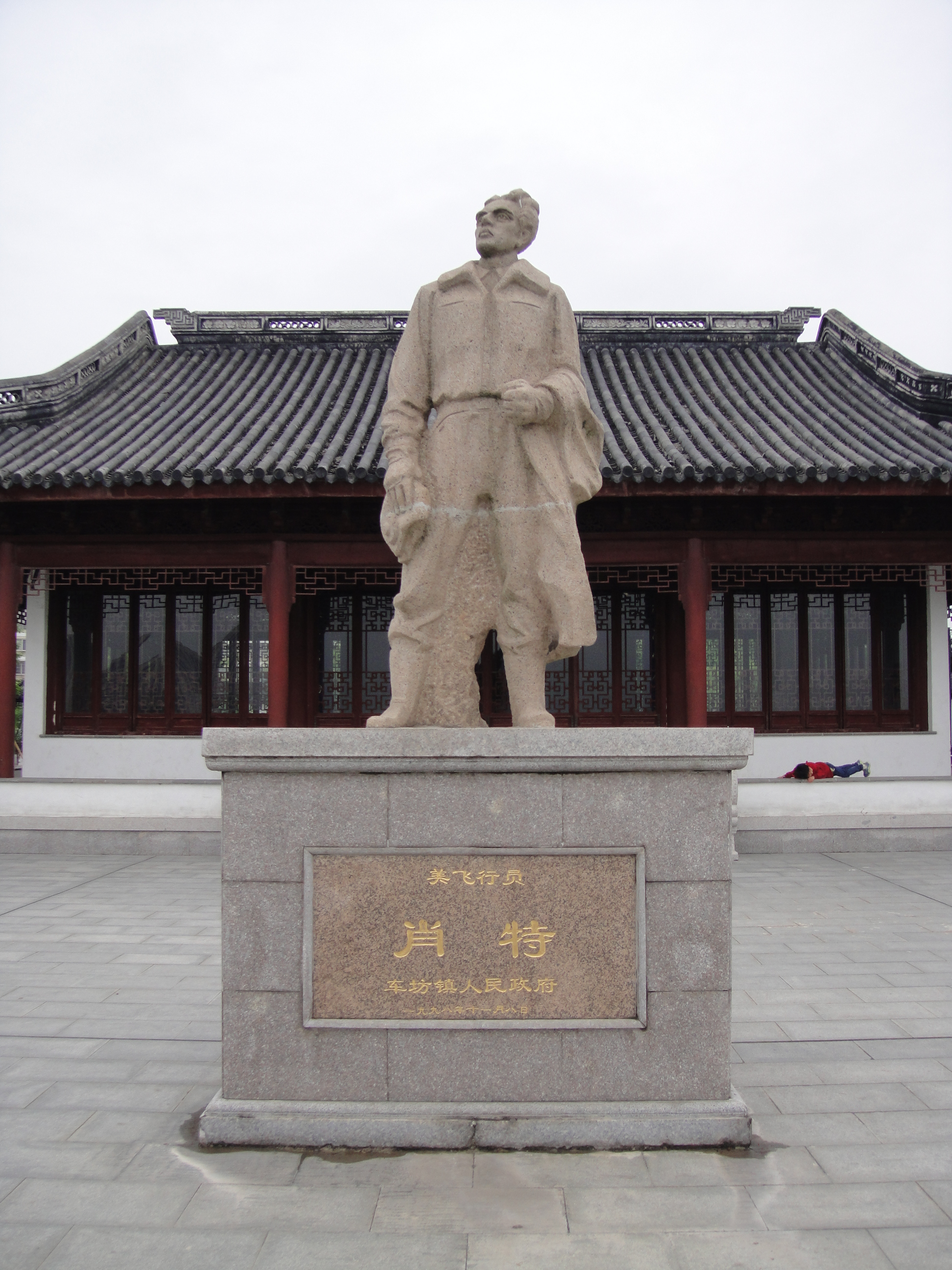
Statue

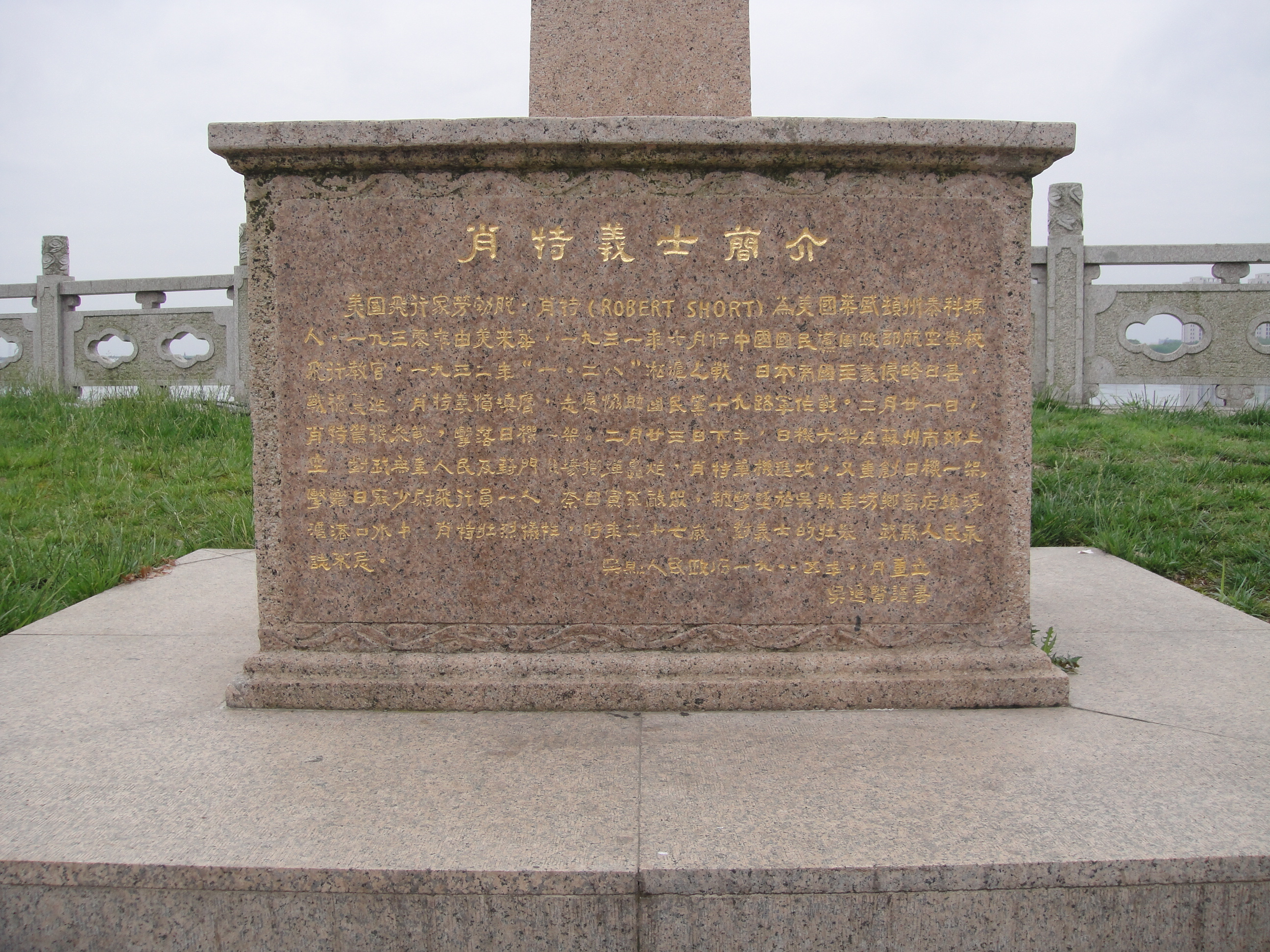
Biography

== See also ==
- Toshio Kuroiwa
- The First of the Flying Tigers; Bob Short, The Hero of Suzhou
- The Robert Short Collection/The Museum of Flight (Seattle, Wash.)
