= Japanese destroyer Asashimo =

Yūgumo-class destroyer

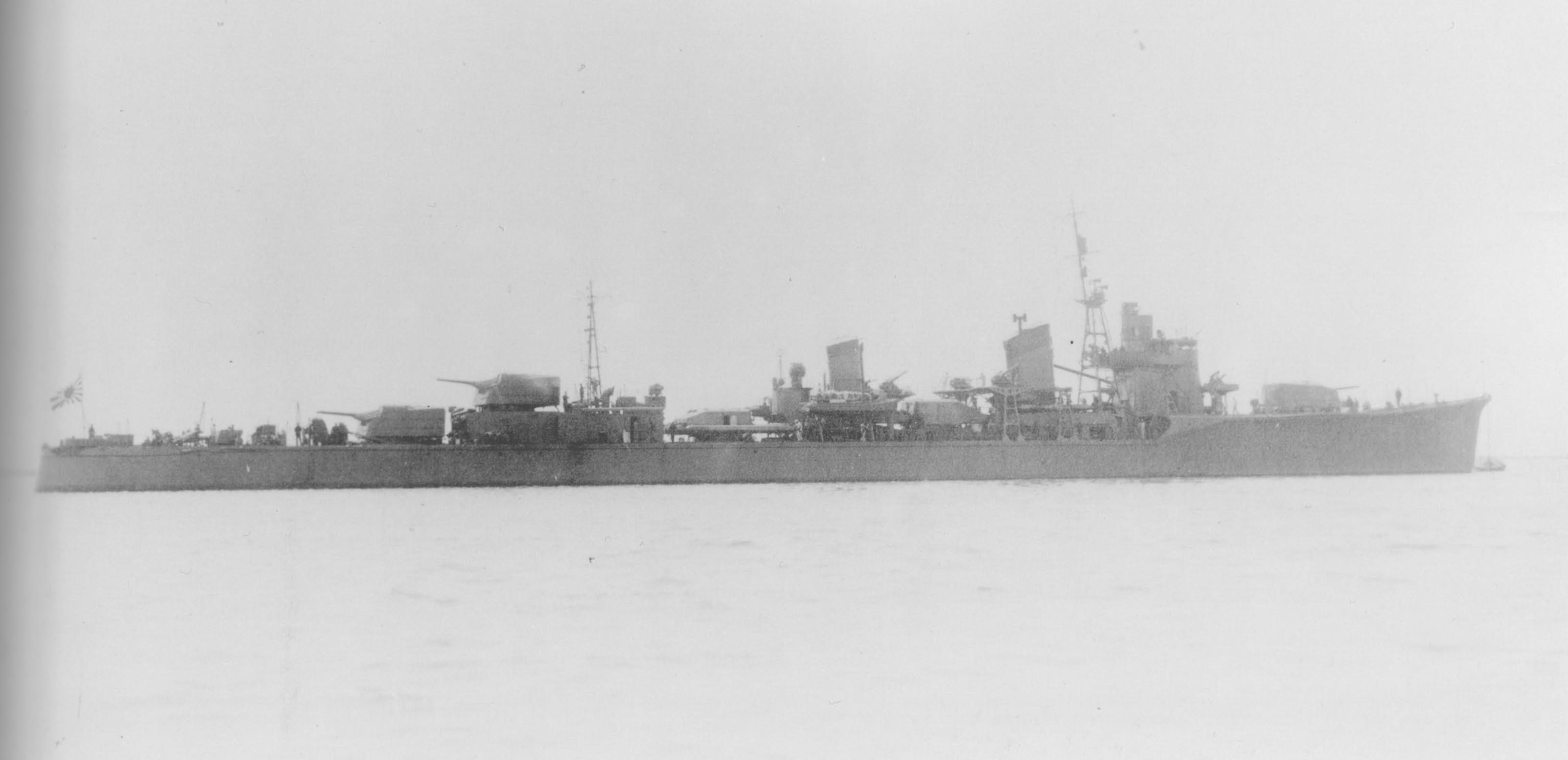
- Asashimo on 27 November 1943.

History

Empire of Japan
- Name: Asashimo
- Laid down: 21 January 1943
- Launched: 18 July 1943
- Completed: 27 November 1943
- Stricken: 10 May 1945
- Fate: Sunk in action, 7 April 1945

General characteristics
- Class & type: Yūgumo-class destroyer
- Displacement: 2520 tons
- Length: 119.15 m (390.9 ft)
- Beam: 10.8 m (35 ft)
- Draught: 3.75 m (12.3 ft)
- Speed: 35 kn (65 km/h; 40 mph)
- Complement: 228
- Armament: 6 × 127 mm (5.0 in)/50 caliber DP guns; up to 28 × Type 96 25 mm (0.98 in) AA guns; up to 4 × 13.2 mm (0.52 in) AA guns; 8 × 610 mm torpedo tubes for Type 93 torpedoes; 36 depth charges

Asashimo (朝霜; "Morning Frost") was a Yūgumo-class destroyer of the Imperial Japanese Navy. Asashimo sank the submarine USS Trout on 29 February 1944, survived the battles of Leyte Gulf and Ormoc Bay, and was finally among the several ships sunk during Operation Ten-Go by attacking US aircraft on 7 April 1945.

== Service career and fate ==
On 29 February 1944, while escorting a large convoy en route to Truk, Asashimo detected the submarine USS Rock making a night surface approach on the convoy. Rock fired a spread of four torpedoes from her stern tubes at the closing Asashimo without scoring a hit. Illuminated by the destroyer's searchlight, and under fire from the ship's 5-inch (130 mm) guns, Rock dived. For four hours Asashimo continued depth charge attacks, without success. That night Rock surfaced and found that her periscopes were excessively damaged and that her bridge had been riddled with shrapnel. The damage necessitated a return to Pearl Harbor for repairs. Later that night, the busy Asashimo sank the submarine USS Trout. Japanese records indicate that one of their convoys, Matsu No. 1, was attacked by a submarine on 29 February 1944 in the patrol area assigned to Trout. Carrying the 29th Infantry Division of the Kwantung Army from Manchuria to Guam, Matsu No. 1 consisted of four large transports escorted by three Yūgumo-class destroyers of Destroyer Division 31: Asashimo, Kishinami, and Okinami. The submarine badly damaged one large passenger-cargo ship and sank the 7,126-ton transport Sakito Maru. About 2,200 of the 3,500 men aboard the Sakito Maru died, which included a large portion of the 18th Infantry Regiment. Asashimo detected the submarine and dropped 19 depth charges. Oil and debris came to the surface and the destroyer dropped a final depth charge on that spot. All 81 hands on board Trout were lost at the position 22°40′N 131°45′E.

Asashimo participated in the Battle of the Philippine Sea. During the Battle of Leyte Gulf, she rescued survivors of the cruiser Atago on 23 October. At the Battle of Ormoc Bay, she was the only destroyer to survive the strike on the TA-4 transport convoy. On 26 December 1944, she assisted in scuttling the destroyer Kiyoshimo and rescued 167 crewmen including the other ship's commanding officer.

On 6 April 1945, Asashimo escorted the battleship Yamato from the Inland Sea on Operation Ten-Go towards Okinawa. She was sunk on 7 April by aircraft of Task Force 58, from the aircraft carrier USS San Jacinto after falling astern of the Yamato task force due to engine trouble, 150 miles (240 km) southwest of Nagasaki. All of her 326 crew members - as well as Commander Destroyer Division 21 (Captain Hisao Kotaki) - lost their lives. The others, including the destroyer Hamakaze, were sunk during the same attack, also by aircraft of San Jacinto, but several destroyers, such as Suzutsuki survived with heavy damage. Asashimo was sunk at 31°N 128°E.

== Gallery ==
Several photos were taken of Asashimo during her final battle, easily distinguishable due to her X turret.

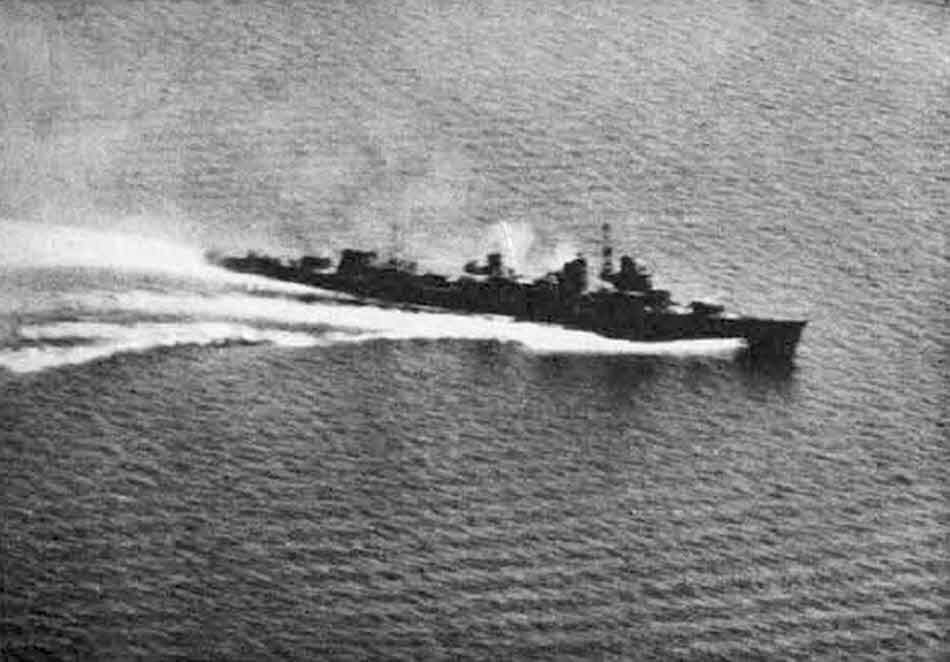

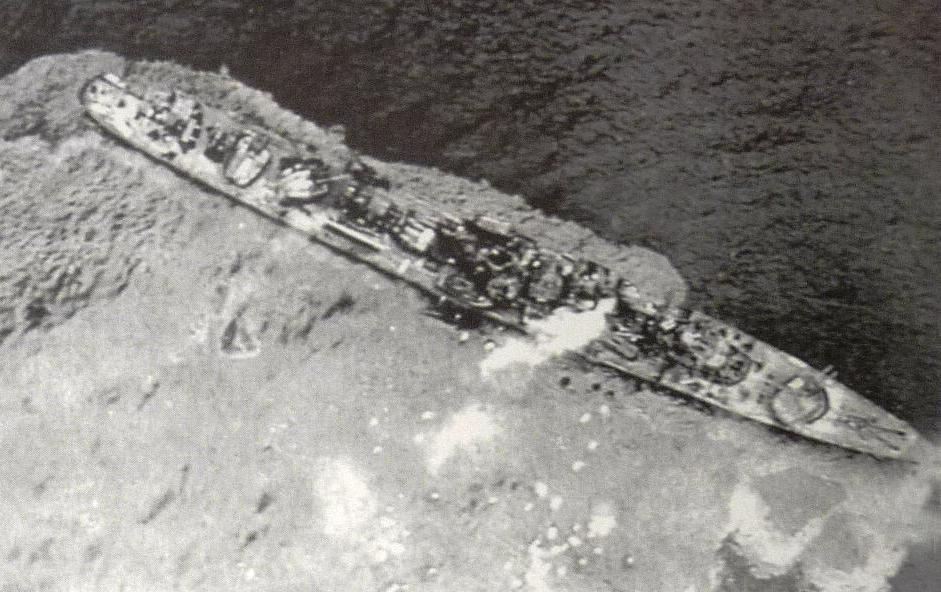

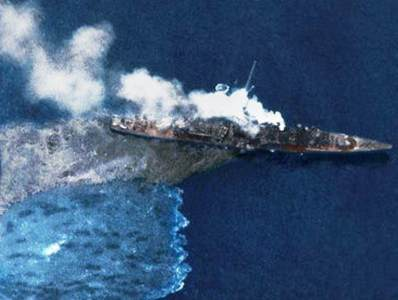

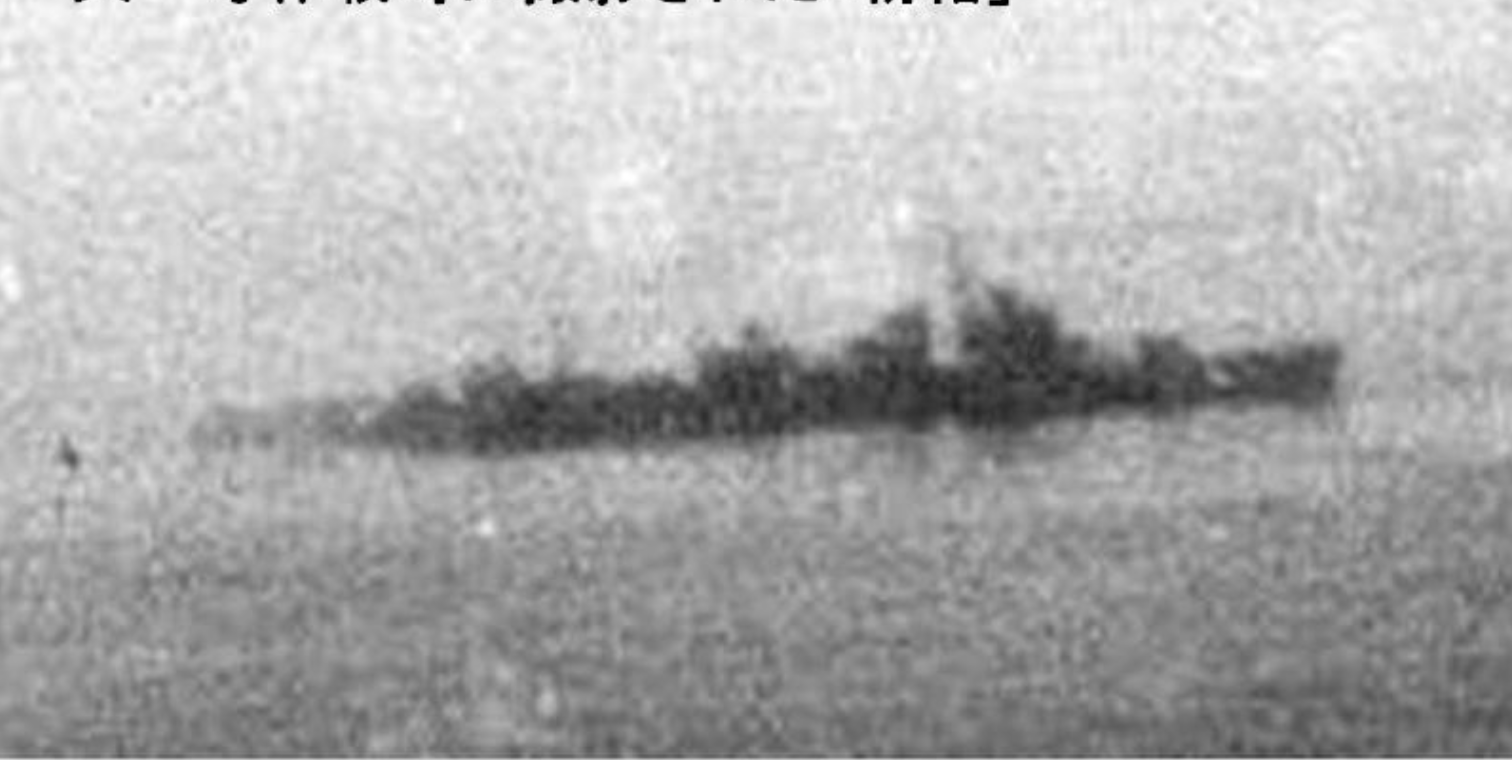

== See also ==
- Operation Kita
- Operation Ten-Go
- List of ships of the Imperial Japanese Navy

== Bibliography ==
- Sturton, Ian (1980). "Japan". In Chesneau, Roger (ed.). Conway's All the World's Fighting Ships 1922–1946. Greenwich, UK: Conway Maritime Press. pp. 167–217. ISBN 0-85177-146-7.
- Whitley, M. J. (2000). Destroyers of World War Two: An International Encyclopedia. London: Cassell & Co. ISBN 1-85409-521-8.
