= Sakito Maru =

Troop ship of the Imperial Japanese Navy

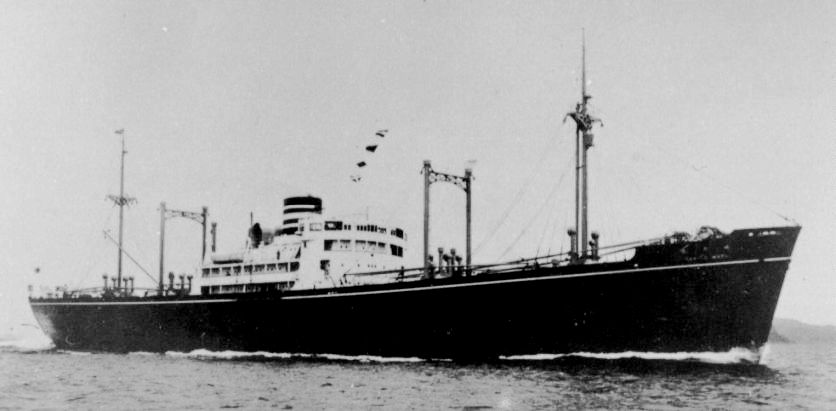
- Sakito Maru seen before World War II.

History

Japan
- Builder: Mitsubishi Zosen Kaisha (Nagasaki)
- Laid down: 16 April 1938
- Launched: 27 October 1938
- In service: 29 January 1939
- Fate: Sunk by USS Trout, 1 March 1944

General characteristics
- Class & type: Type S cargo ship
- Type: Troop transport
- Tonnage: 7,126 GRT
- Length: 145 metres (475 ft 9 in)
- Beam: 19 metres (62 ft 4 in)
- Draught: 12.5 metres (41 ft 0 in)
- Speed: 19.7 knots (36.5 km/h; 22.7 mph)

Sakito Maru (Japanese: 崎戸丸) was a 7,126-ton Japanese troop transport that operated during World War II. She was sunk on 1 March 1944 with great loss of life.

== Construction ==
Sakito Maru was built in 1939 by the Mitsubishi Zosen Kaisha in Nagasaki for the Nippon Yusen shipping company. She was the lead ship of seven ships of the Type S cargo ship (S型貨物船, S-gata kamotsusen) of high speed transports:

- Sakito Maru (崎戸丸),
- Sanuki Maru (讃岐丸),
- Sado Maru (佐渡丸),
- Sagami Maru (相模丸),
- Sagara Maru (相良丸),
- Sasako Maru (笹子丸),
- Sakura Maru (佐倉丸).

== Early service ==
On the foggy morning of 4 September 1940, Sakito Maru collided with the 1,514-gross register ton fishing barge Olympic II, which was anchored on the Horseshoe Kelp fishing bank at the entrance of Los Angeles Harbor off Los Angeles, California. Olympic II sank in 100 feet (30 m) of water with the loss of seven or eight lives.

On 24 September 1941, Sakito Maru took the Japanese cargo ship Arima Maru — which had been refloated after running aground on the coast of Peru 4 nautical miles (7.4 km; 4.6 mi) south of the harbor at Mollendo on 25 May 1941 — under tow to Callao, Peru. After temporary repairs to Arima Maru at Callao, Sakito Maru departed Callao with Arima Maru under tow on 9 October 1941 and proceeded to Yokohama, Japan. On 20 November 1941, the two vessels arrived at Yokohama, where Arima Maru underwent permanent repairs.

== Battle of the Komandorski Islands ==
After the beginning of World War II, Sakito Maru was converted into a troop transport. She and the merchant cruiser Asaka Maru were operating as transports, carrying reinforcements to the Japanese garrison of Attu in the Aleutian Islands during the Aleutian Islands campaign, when their convoy encountered the warships of United States Navy Task Group 16.6 in the North Pacific Ocean near the Komandorski Islands on 27 March 1943. Sakito Maru and Asaka Maru steamed away and avoided combat in the ensuing Battle of the Komandorski Islands. Two U.S. Navy PBY Catalina flying boats sighted the two transports during the afternoon, but land-based United States Army Air Forces airstrikes launched against them during the afternoon failed to find them. They returned safely to Paramushiro in the Kuril Islands, but failed to deliver the reinforcements to Attu.

== Loss ==
On 29 February 1944, Sakito Maru was carrying the Imperial Japanese Army′s 18th Infantry Regiment as part of Convoy Matsu-01, which was transporting the 29th Division of the Kwantung Army from Manchukuo to Guam. Matsu No. 1 consisted of four large transports escorted by three Yūgumo-class destroyers of Destroyer Division 31, namely Asashimo, Kishinami, and Okinami. The American submarine USS Trout (SS-202) attacked the convoy about 625 nautical miles (1,158 km; 719 mi) east of Formosa. The submarine badly damaged the large passenger-cargo ship Aki Maru. Two torpedoes also hit Sakito Maru around 17:56 and she caught fire.

Asashimo detected Trout and dropped 19 depth charges. Oil and debris came to the surface and the destroyer dropped a final depth charge on that spot, sinking the American submarine with the loss of all 81 hands at the position 22°40′N 131°45′E.

At 04:00 on 1 March 1944, the burning Sakito Maru sank. Of the 3,500 men on board, 2,358 soldiers, 65 ship's gunners, and 52 crewmen died. Also lost were several light tanks and most of the regiment's equipment. The men aboard Sakito Maru on that day included a subsequent Japanese holdout, Sakae Ōba.

== See also ==
- List by death toll of ships sunk by submarines
- List of maritime disasters in World War II
