= Okinami =

Okinami may refer to:

- okinami (沖波), a Japanese word translated as "offshore wave", a type of ocean surface wave
- Japanese destroyer Okinami of the Imperial Japanese Navy
- Kanagawa oki nami ura, the Japanese name for the woodblock print The Great Wave off Kanagawa
