= Japanese invasion of Thailand =

1941 brief attempt at invading Thailand by Japan

- Part of the Pacific War of World War II
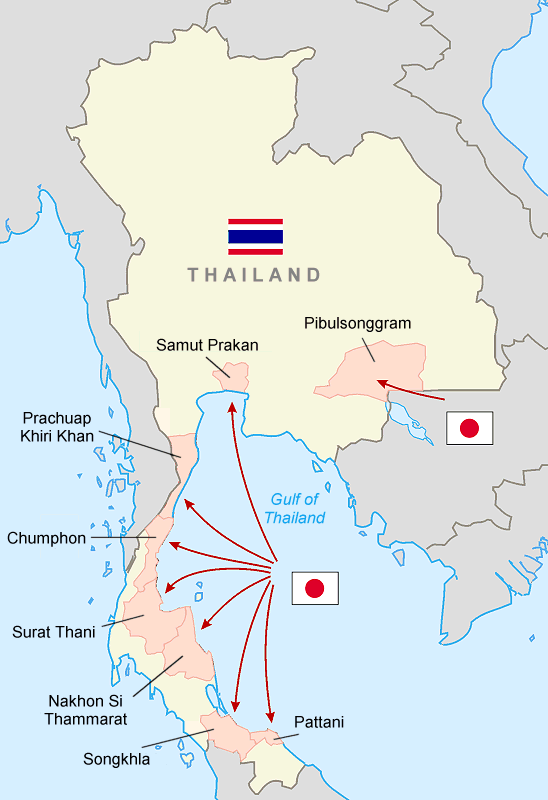
- Map of the Japanese invasion of Thailand, 8 December 1941
Date	8 December 1941 (5 hours)
Location	Thailand
Result	Ceasefire

Belligerents
Thailand	Japan

Commanders and leaders
Plaek Phibunsongkhram	Shōjirō Iida; Tomoyuki Yamashita; Nobutake Kondō

Units involved
Royal Thai Army; Royal Thai Air Force; Royal Thai Navy; Territorial Defense Student; Royal Thai Police	(Empire of Japan) 15th army (Empire of Japan) 25th army (Empire of Japan) 2nd Fleet

Strength
62,000 (123,500 reservists); 150 combat aircraft 1 cruiser 6 destroyers 4 battleship 3 submarines	100,000; 1 cruiser 7 destroyers 2 battleships 2 merchant seaplane carriers 18 transport ships

Casualties and losses
Thai Claim: 180 killed 27 Wounded	Japanese Claim: 115 killed 217 killed Thai Estimated: 300+ wounded

The Japanese invasion of Thailand (Thai: การบุกครองไทยของญี่ปุ่น, RTGS: Kan Buk Khrong Thai Khong Yipun; Japanese: 日本軍のタイ進駐, romanized: Nihongun no Tai shinchū) occurred on 8 December 1941. It was briefly fought between the Kingdom of Thailand and the Empire of Japan. Despite fierce fighting in southern Thailand, the fighting lasted only five hours before ending in a ceasefire. Thailand and Japan then formed an alliance making Thailand part of the Axis alliance until the end of World War II. It occurred roughly two hours before the Japanese attack on Pearl Harbor.

== Background ==
=== Hakkō Ichiu ===
The origin of Japanese invasion of Thailand can be traced to the principle of hakkō ichiu as espoused by Tanaka Chigaku in the mid- to late-1800s. Tanaka interpreted the principle as meaning that imperial rule had been divinely ordained to expand until it united the entire world. While Tanaka saw this outcome as resulting from the Emperor's moral leadership, Japanese nationalists used it in terms of freeing Asia from colonizing powers and establishing Japan as the leading influence in Asia. The concept became expressed in the New Order in East Asia (東亜新秩序, Tōa Shin Chitsujo).

In 1940, the concept was expanded by Prime Minister Fumimaro Konoe, who sought to create the Greater East Asia Co-Prosperity Sphere, including Japan, Manchukuo, China, and parts of Southeast Asia. This would, according to imperial propaganda, establish a new international order seeking "co-prosperity" for Asian countries which would share prosperity and peace, free from Western colonialism and domination under the umbrella of a benevolent Japan.The 30 man Number 82 Section (also known as the Taiwan Army Research Unit or Doro Nawa Unit) Strike South planning was formed in 1939 or 1940 to bring this about. In its final planning stages, the unit was commanded by Colonel Yoshihide Hayashi.

=== Prelude ===
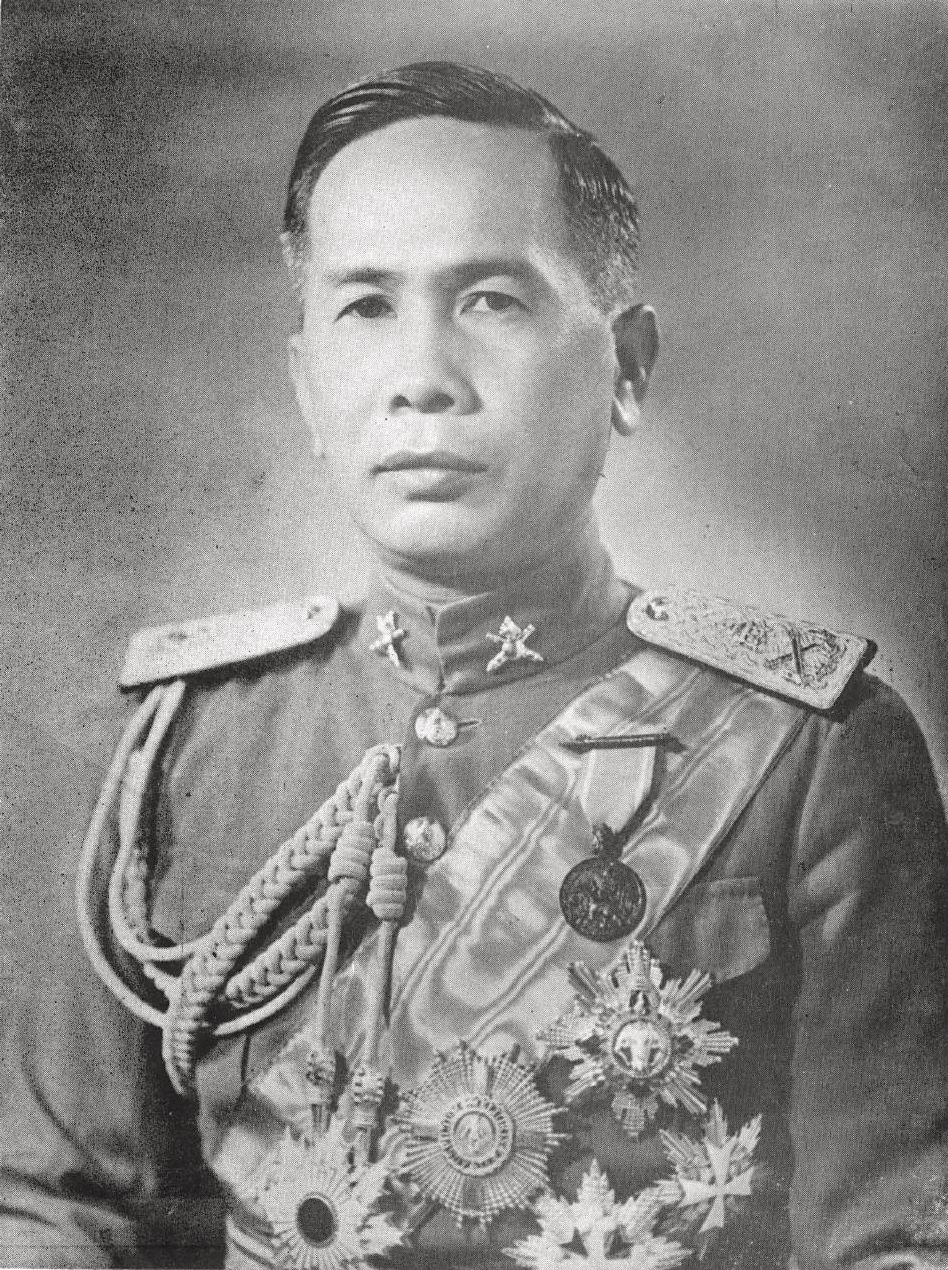
Plaek Phibunsongkhram, Prime Minister of Thailand

As part of conquering Southeast Asia, the Japanese military planned to invade Malaya and Burma. In order to do this, they needed to make use of Thai ports, railways, and airfields. They did not want conflict with the Thai military, as this would delay the invasion and significantly reduce the element of surprise. The Japanese plan was seen by the Nazi government of Germany as helpful in diverting the United Kingdom's military forces, and thus assisting Germany in its own conflict.

Thailand had a well-disciplined military, and after a series of border skirmishes in 1940 had invaded neighbouring French Indochina to recover provinces lost in the Franco-Siamese crisis of 1893. The Japanese, who wanted to use the Indo-Chinese ports and air-bases, acted as negotiators to bring about a settlement between the French and Thais on 31 January 1941. As part of the process, secret discussions were held with Thai Prime Minister Plaek Phibunsongkhram, in which the Japanese military sought free passage through Thailand. Phibun had responded positively, but his later actions showed he may have been very uncertain, as he had concluded the British–Thai Non-Aggression Pact on 12 June 1940. By February, the British were beginning to suspect the Japanese were planning to attack their possessions in Southeast Asia and were concerned Japan might set up bases in Thailand to that end.

The situation Phibun faced was that France had now been defeated by Germany, and Britain was heavily engaged in Europe; the United States had until then taken a neutral stance on both the European war and the Japanese war with China; and Japan was a superpower with a growing buildup of forces in French Indochina. Phibun may have decided he had little choice, as his own forces would have been unable to defeat the Japanese by themselves. Thailand's invasion of French Indochina in 1940 also made it difficult for the United States government to support Phibun.

Midway through 1941, Phibun sought British and American guarantees of effective support if Japan invaded Thailand. Neither the United Kingdom nor the United States could give them, although British Prime Minister Winston Churchill was in favour of a public warning to Japan that an invasion of the Southeast Asian kingdom would result in a British declaration of war. However, the United States was unwilling to agree to this, and Britain was not prepared to make it alone.

By August, the United Kingdom and the United States had placed sanctions against Japan. (For further information, see the Hull note and the McCollum memo.) The Japanese sought to have the sanctions lifted by promising not to encroach on Thailand and withdrawing their forces from Indochina, provided the United States withdrew its support for China. This was unacceptable to both Britain and the United States because of its impact on China.

=== Final days ===
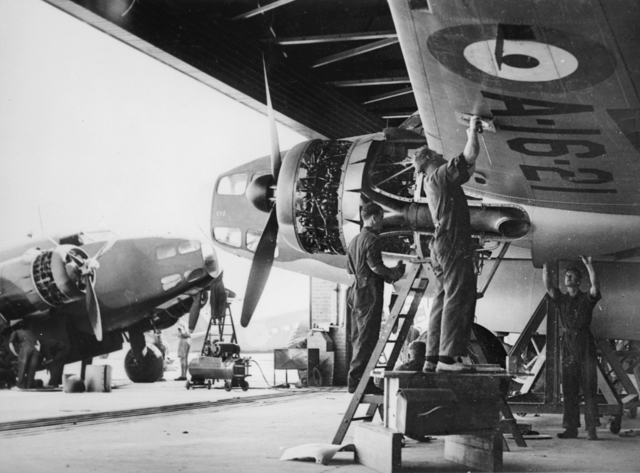
No. 1 Squadron RAAF Lockheed Hudsons at Kota Bharu in 1941

In late November, the British became aware of a probable attack on Thailand by Japan because of the rapid buildup of Japanese troops in Indochina. On 1 December 1941, Prime Minister Hideki Tojo of Japan stated that he was uncertain where Thailand stood regarding allowing Japanese troops free passage through its territory, but was hopeful a clash could be avoided. Further negotiations took place between the Japanese diplomatic representative, Tamara, and Phibun on 2 December. Phibun was prepared to look the other way if Japan invaded the Kra Peninsula, but wanted them to avoid passing through the Bangkok Plain. After further discussions on 3 December, Phibun agreed to passage through Thailand, provided Thailand could regain the territories ceded in the Anglo-Siamese Treaty of 1909, as well as Burma's Shan State.

On 2 December, the Japanese military issued the order "Climb Mount Niitaka", which set in motion the war in the Pacific. The main invasion fleet for Operation "E", the invasion of Malaya and Thailand, sailed from Sanya, Hainan Island, China on 4 December. Further troops and ships joined the fleet from Cam Ranh Bay, Indochina. While the Japanese were preparing, the British and Americans were formulating their response to the Japanese troop buildup and the potential invasion of Thailand. Phibun, on the same day he reached an agreement with the Japanese, was advised by the British that Thailand was about to be invaded by the Japanese.

There is a possibility of imminent Japanese invasion of your country. If you are attacked, defend yourselves. The preservation of the true independence and sovereignty of Thailand is a British interest, and we shall regard an attack on you as an attack upon ourselves.

— Winston Churchill's message to Plaek Phibunsongkhram.

At noon on 6 December, one of three RAAF No 1 Squadron Lockheed Hudsons on a reconnaissance flight over the South China Sea, located three Japanese ships steaming west, and about 15 minutes later, sighted the IJN Southern Expeditionary Fleet convoy, consisting of a battleship, five cruisers, seven destroyers and 22 transports. One of the two merchant seaplane tenders with the convoy, the Kamikawa Maru, launched a Mitsubishi F1M "Pete" floatplane to intercept the Hudson, which eluded it by taking cover in the clouds. A few minutes later, a second Hudson also sighted the convoy.

Air Chief Marshal Sir Robert Brooke-Popham was advised of the sightings at 14:00. He was not authorised to take any action against the convoy, as Britain was not at war with Japan, the Japanese intentions were still unclear, and no aggressive action had yet been taken against British or Thai territory. He put his forces in Malaya on full alert and ordered continued surveillance of the convoy.

On 7 December at 03:00, Vice-Admiral Jisaburō Ozawa ordered patrols in the area between the convoy and Malaya. The convoy was about 100 nautical miles (190 kilometres) from Kota Bharu. There was heavy rain and zero visibility. The Kamikawa Maru and Sagara Maru launched 11 F1M2's and six Aichi E13A's. About 20 nmi (37 km) west northwest of Panjang Island at 08:20, an E13A1 ZI-26 from the Kamikawa Maru, piloted by Ensign Ogata Eiichi, spotted a No. 205 Squadron RAF Consolidated PBY Catalina reconnaissance flying boat (W8417), piloted by Warrant Officer William E Webb. Ogata attacked the Catalina from the rear, damaging it and destroying its radio. Ogata shadowed the Catalina for 25 minutes until five Nakajima Ki-27 "Nate" fighters from the JAAF's 1st Sentai in Indo-China arrived and shot it down. Webb and his crew were the first casualties of the Pacific War. Unaware of this incident, the British took no action. Ogata would later be killed in the Battle of the Coral Sea.

At 23:00 on 7 December, the Japanese presented the Thai government with an ultimatum to allow the Japanese military to enter Thailand. The Thais were given two hours to respond.

== Military forces ==
=== Thailand ===
Thailand had a well-trained military of 26,500 men, together with a reserve force which brought the army's numbers up to about 50,000.

The Royal Thai Air Force possessed some 270 aircraft, of which 150 were combat aircraft, many of them American. Japan had provided Thailand with 93 more modern aircraft in December 1940.

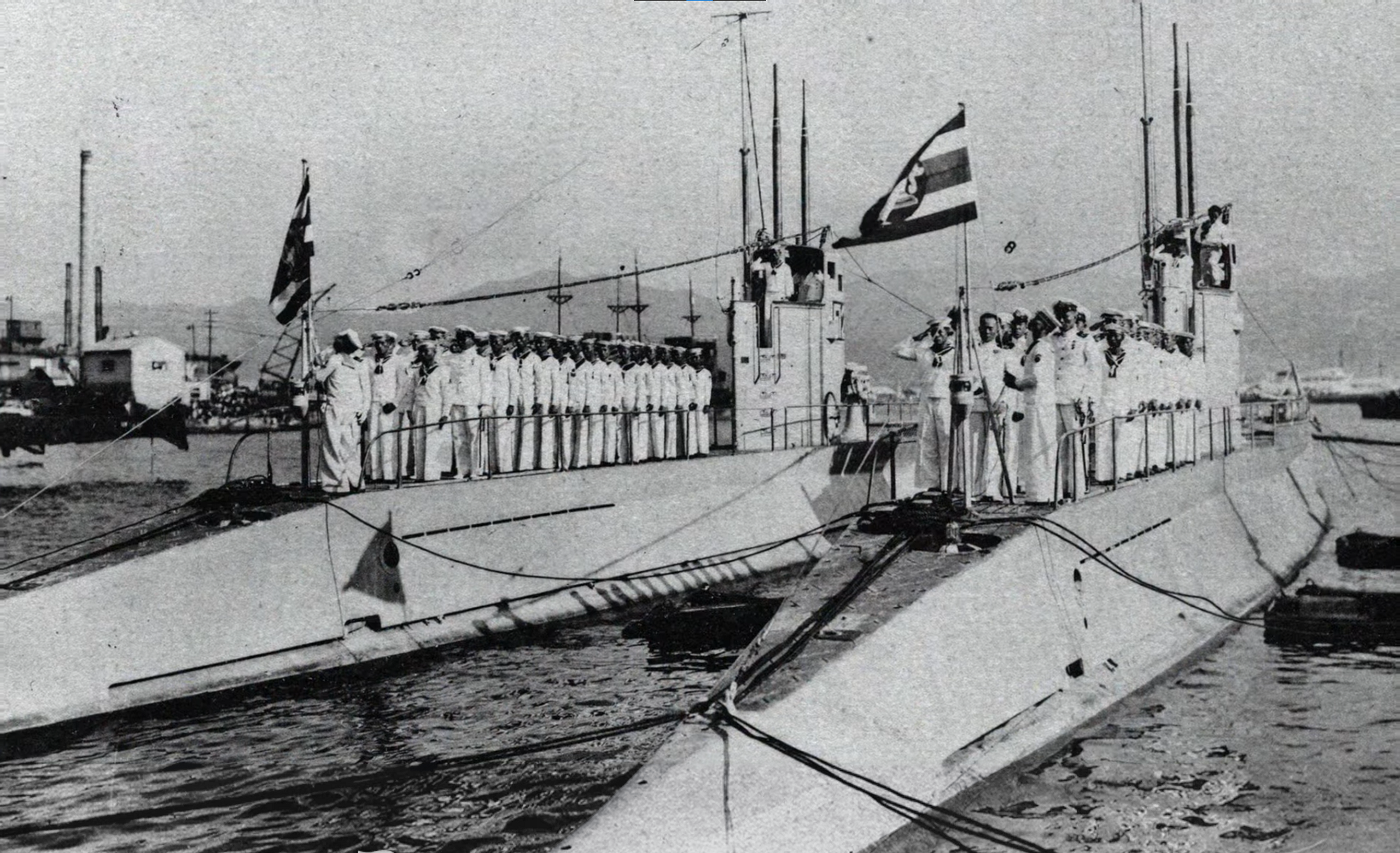
HTMS Matchanu and Wirun at Kobe Port

The Royal Thai Navy was poorly trained and equipped, and had lost a substantial number of vessels in its conflict with French Indochina. However, the Thai Navy had two operating submarines, HTMS Matchanu and HTMS Wirun, which were a cause of concern for the Japanese commanders.

The Royal Thai Army started to set up the new military units in the Kra Peninsula including:

- Chumphon
  - the 38th Infantry Battalion stationed at Ban Na Nian, Tambon Wang Mai, Muang District of Chumphon (9 km from Provincial Hall).
- Nakhon Si Thammarat
  - the 39th Infantry Battalion stationed at Tambon Pak Phoon, Muang District of Nakhon Si Thammarat.
  - the 15th Artillery Battalion stationed at Tambon Pak Phoon, Muang District of Nakhon Si Thammarat.
  - Headquarter of the Sixth Division at Tambon Pak Phoon, Muang District of Nakhon Si Thammarat.
- Trang
  - the 40th Infantry Battalion.
- Songkla
  - the 5th Infantry Battalion stationed at Tambon Khao Kho Hong, Hat Yai District of Songkla, transferred from Bang Sue to Hat Yai by military train on 18 February 1940, the first unit that moved to the south.
  - the 41st Infantry Battalion stationed at Suan Tun, Tambon Khao Roob Chang, Muang District of Songkla.
  - the 13th Artillery Battalion stationed at Suan Tun, Tambon Khao Roob Chang, Muang District of Songkla.
- Pattani
  - the 42nd Infantry Battalion stationed at Tambon Bo Thong, Nong Jik District of Pattani.

=== Japan ===
==== Army units ====
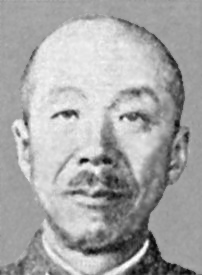
Japanese 15th Army Commander Lieutenant General Shōjirō Iida

Japan had units of its 15th Army under Lieutenant General Shōjirō Iida and 25th Army under Lieutenant General Tomoyuki Yamashita stationed in Indochina. Both armies had combat aircraft units. The 15th Army was tasked with the attack on Burma and the 25th with Malaya and Singapore. In order to attack Burma, the 15th Army needed to pass over the Bangkok plain, while the 25th Army needed to attack Malaya via the Kra Peninsula. The attack through Thailand on Malaya and Singapore was planned by Colonel Masanobu Tsuji while he was part of Unit 82. The Japanese had about 100,000 troops who needed to pass through Thailand.

==== Naval forces ====
Ships from IJN 2nd Fleet under Admiral Nobutake Kondō provided support and cover for the landings in Thailand and at Kota Baru in Malaya.

The known IJN ships participating, apart from those sent to Kota Baru, were:

- the cruiser Kashii escorted seven transports carrying troops of the 143rd Regiment from Saigon
- Destroyers Asagiri, Amagiri, Sagiri, Yūgiri, Shirakumo, and Shinonome supported the 25th Army landings in southern Thailand
- Escort ship Shimushu escorted transports Zenyo Maru, Miike Maru and Toho Maru' to Nakorn Sri Thammarat, southern Thailand, with more of the 143rd Regiment
- Merchant seaplane carriers Kamikawa Maru, Sagara Maru

In total there were 18 transports involved, which included three landing troops at Kota Baru.

== Japanese invasion ==
Japanese troops invaded Thailand from Indochina and with landings south of Bangkok and at various points along the Kra Peninsula several hours after Thailand had not responded to their ultimatum. While the government debated a response, Phibun could not be located and was unaware of the ultimatum until late morning.

=== 15th Army objectives ===
==== Phra Tabong Province ====
At dawn the Imperial Guards Division under Lieutenant-General Takuma Nishimura and IJA 55th Division under Lieutenant-General Hiroshi Takeuchi of the 15th Army crossed the border from Indo-China into Thailand's recently reclaimed Phra Tabong Province at Tambon Savay Donkeo, Athuek Thewadej District (Russei) of Battambang. The Japanese encountered no resistance, and from Sisophon swung north-westwards into Aranyaprathet (then still a district of Prachinburi Province) along the nearly finished railway link between Aranyaprathet and Monkhol Bourei. (It opened for traffic on 11 April 1942.)

==== Chumphon ====
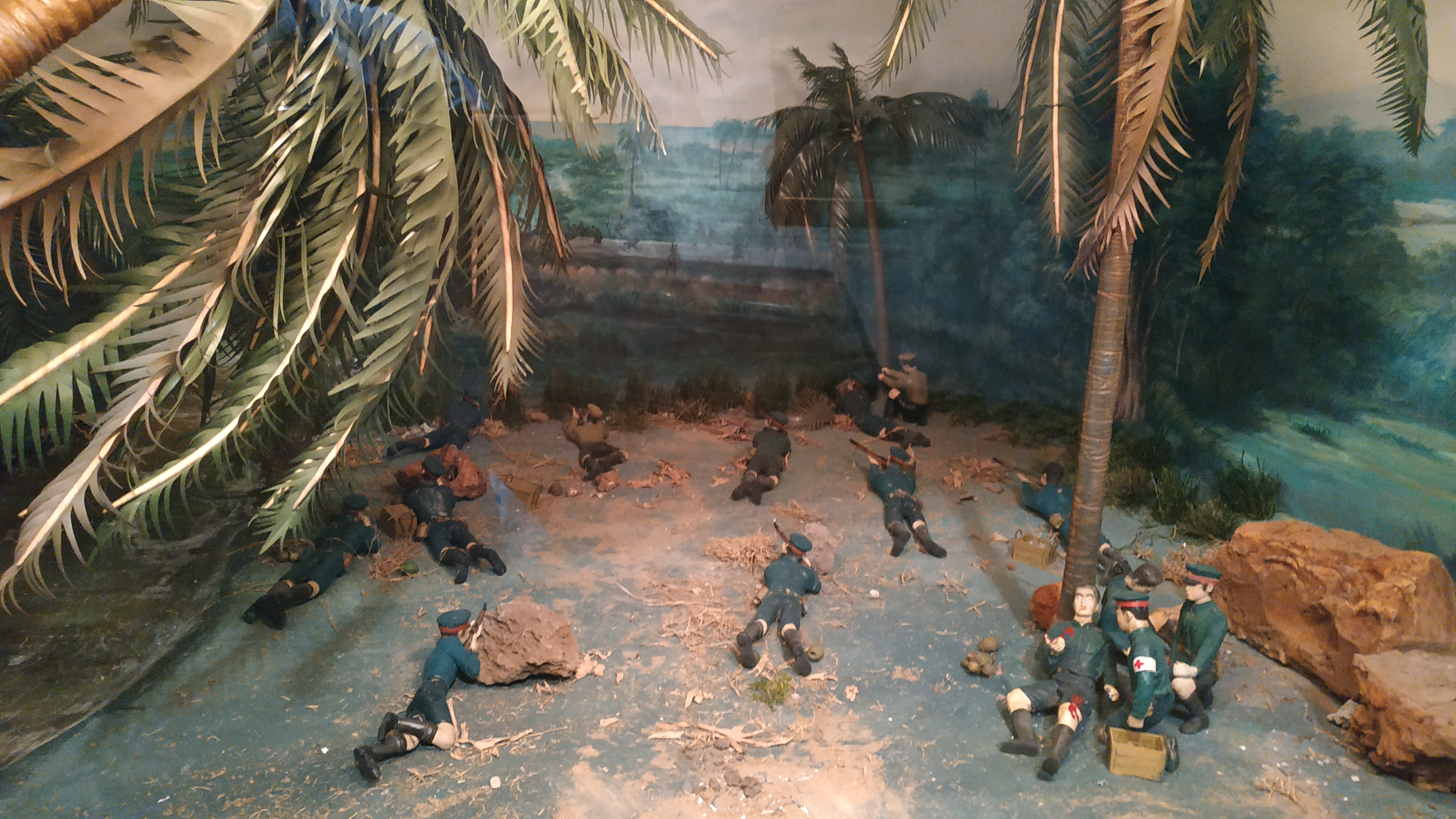
Thai Junior Soldiers ("'Yuwachon Thahan"), along with the 38th Infantry Battalion and Provincial Police of Chumphon, fought the Imperial Japanese Army at Tha Nang Sang Bridge, Chumphon Province, on 8 December 1941.

The Japanese 1st Infantry Battalion of the 143rd Infantry Regiment (part of the IJA 55th Division) landed at Chumphon on the morning of 8 December from two troop ships. They managed to form a perimeter around their landing areas, but were pinned down by determined resistance by Thai 'Yuwachon Thahan' ('youth soldier' cadets of the 52nd Yuwachon Thahan Training Unit from Sriyaphai Secondary School), along with the regular army 38th Infantry Battalion and Provincial Police of Chumphon. Fighting ended in the afternoon when the Thais received orders to cease fire. The Thai had lost Captain Thawin Niyomsen (commanding the 52nd Yuwachon Thahan Unit, posthumously promoted to Lt. Col.), some provincial policemen and a few civilians.

==== Nakhon Si Thammarat ====
Nakhon Si Thammarat was the site of the 6th Army Region headquarters and the 39th Infantry Battalion and 15th Artillery Battalion. Three Japanese troopships, Zenyo, Miike, and Toho Maru, landed troops at Nakhon Si Thammarat, covered by the Shimushu, dropped anchor a few kilometres off the coast during the night of 7 December. The ships carried 1,510 men and 50 trucks of the 3rd Infantry Battalion of the 143rd Infantry Regiment, the 18th Air District Regiment along with an army air force signals unit, the 32nd Anti-Aircraft Battalion, and the 6th Labour Construction Company. Shortly after midnight, they began disembarking their troops at Tha Phae canal (AKA Pak Phoon Canal), north of Camp Vajiravudh.

The landing was made adjacent to the main Thai army camp, Camp Vajiravudh. The Thais, notified earlier of the Japanese invasion at Songkhla, immediately went into action. The battle lasted until midday, when the prime minister's orders for a ceasefire were received.

==== Prachuap Khiri Khan ====
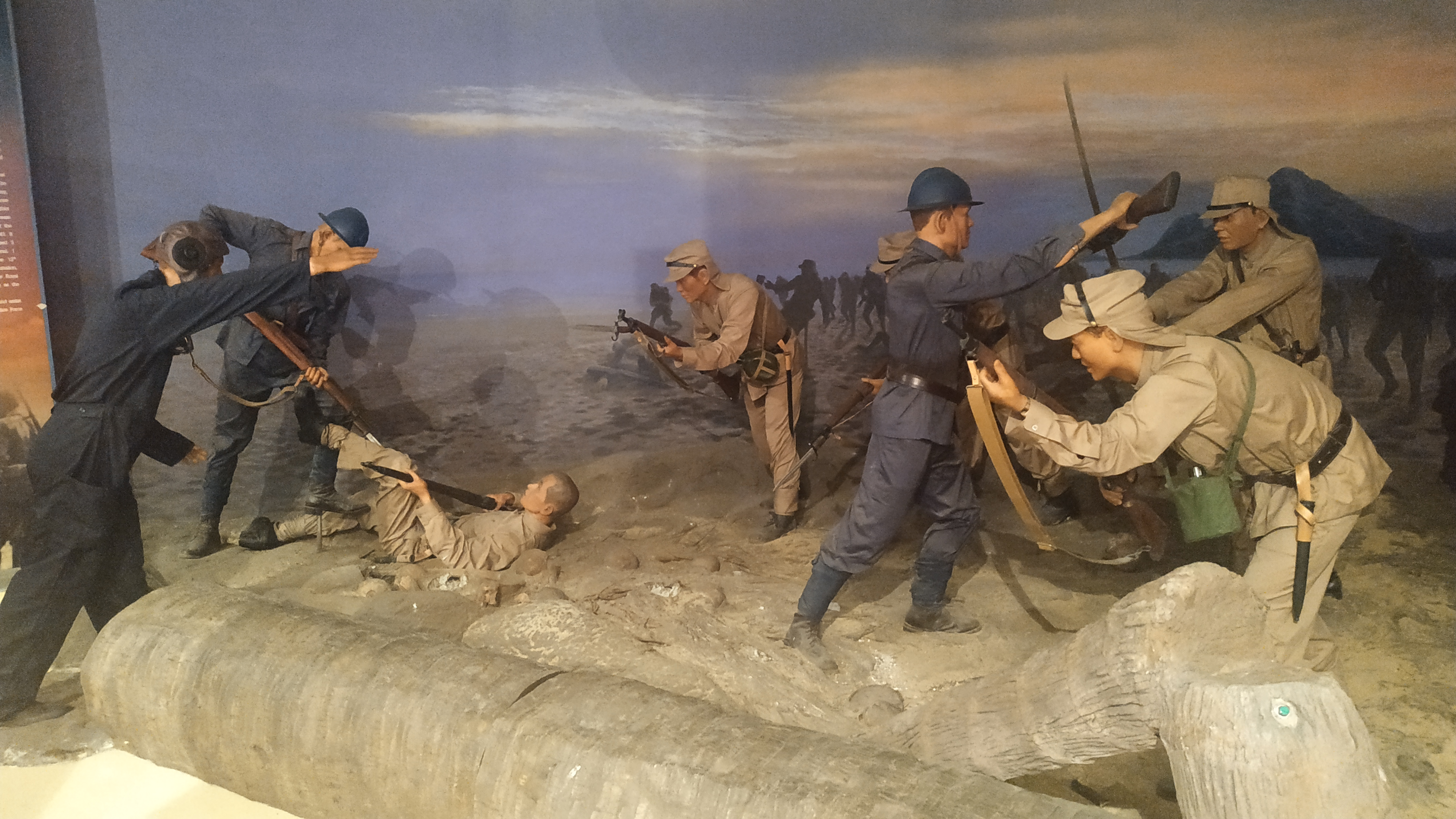
Reproduction scene of the Battle of Prachuap Khiri Khan, displayed at the National Memorial, Pathum Thani, Thailand

Prachuap Khiri Khan was home to the Royal Thai Air Force's Fifth Wing, under the command of Wing Commander Mom Luang Prawat Chumsai. The Japanese 2nd Infantry Battalion of the 143rd Infantry Regiment under Major Kisoyoshi Utsunomiya landed at 03:00 from one troopship, and occupied the town after having crushed police resistance there.

Further landings took place near the airfield to the south. The Japanese laid siege to the airfield, but the Thai airmen along with Prachuap Khirikhan Provincial Police managed to hold out until noon on the next day, when they too received the ceasefire order. The Japanese lost 115 dead according to Japanese estimates, and 217 dead and 300+ wounded according to Thai estimates. The Thais lost 37 dead and 27 wounded.

==== Samut Prakan ====
The Japanese 3rd Battalion of the 4th Guards Infantry Regiment landed at Samut Prakan in the early hours of 8 December. It was tasked with the capture of Bangkok. The force was met by a small Thai police detachment. Despite a tense confrontation, fighting did not occur and the Japanese subsequently agreed not to enter the Thai capital until formal negotiations were concluded.

==== Bangkok ====
The Japanese bombed Bangkok with one bomb falling on the main post office, which failed to explode. While police rounded up Japanese residents, the Thai cabinet debated its options while they waited for the prime minister to arrive. Some favoured continued resistance, including the establishment of a government-in-exile, but when Phibun finally arrived, the decision was made to relent, and the Thais caved into Japan's demands. The Japanese then moved into Bangkok, occupying Chinatown (Sampeng) and turning the Chamber of Commerce Building into a command post.

==== Don Muang ====
The Japanese air force attacked Don Muang Royal Thai Air Force Base, which was defended by the Thai air force. The Thais lost six fighter planes to a numerically superior Japanese force.

==== Surat Thani ====
A Japanese infantry company from the 1st Battalion of the 143rd Infantry Regiment landed from one troopship at the coastal village of Ban Don in the early hours of 8 December. They marched into Surat Thani, where they were opposed by Royal Thai Police and civilian volunteers. The desultory fighting took place amid a rainstorm, and only ended in the afternoon when the hard-pressed Thais received orders to lay down their arms. The Thais lost 17 or 18 dead, but the number of injured was not known.

=== 25th Army objectives ===
==== Pattani ====
Due to its closeness to the Malayan border, Pattani was the second most important objective of the Japanese 25th Army. Eight IJN destroyers including the Shirakumo and Shinonome provided support for the five troop transports.

The landings by the 42nd Infantry Regiment of the IJA 5th Division led by Major Shigeharu Asaeda were made despite the rough seas and on unsuitable landing grounds.The invaders were effectively opposed by the Thai 42nd Infantry Battalion, Pattani Provincial Police, and Thai Yuwachon Thahan units (the 66th Yuwachon Thahan Training Unit from Benjama Rachoothit School), until the battalion was ordered to cease fire at midday. The Thai battalion commander, Khun (ขุน) Inkhayutboriharn, was killed in action along with 23 other ranks, 5 Provincial Police, 4 Yuwachon Thahan members, and 9 civilians.

Major Shigeharu Asaeda, when a member of Taiwan Army Unit 82, had been involved with intelligence-gathering in Burma, Thailand, and Malaya prior to the outbreak of war and had selected Pattani as a suitable landing site. Unknown to him, beyond the sandy beach, was a muddy sea bed which caused the invading force considerable difficulty.

==== Songkhla (also known as Singora) ====
The port city of Songkhla was one of the main objectives of Yamashita's 25th Army. During the early hours of 8 December, three regiments of the Japanese 5th Division led by Colonel Tsuji under Lieutenant General Matsui Takuro landed there from 10 troop transports. The landing was supported by IJN destroyers Asagiri, Amagiri, Sagiri, and Yūgiri.

The Thai garrison at Khao Khor Hong (the 41st Infantry Battalion and the 13th Artillery battalion) immediately occupied positions alongside the roads leading down to Malaya, but were brushed aside into positions the main Japanese advance could ignore. A further clash occurred at Hat Yai. The Thais lost 15 dead (8 KIA from 41st Inf. Bat. and 7 from the 5th Inf. bat.) and 30–55 wounded.

The fighting ceased at noon when orders for an armistice to be arranged was received.

==== Malaya ====
While these landings were taking place in Thailand, troops from the Japan's 25th Army also landed further south at Kota Bharu in Malaya.

Once Thailand was secured the 15th Army's 143rd Regiment moved north to replace the Imperial Guards. The Imperial Guards headed south to join the 25th Army and participate in the invasion of Malaya and Singapore. The 15th Army moved to attack Burma.

== Aftermath ==
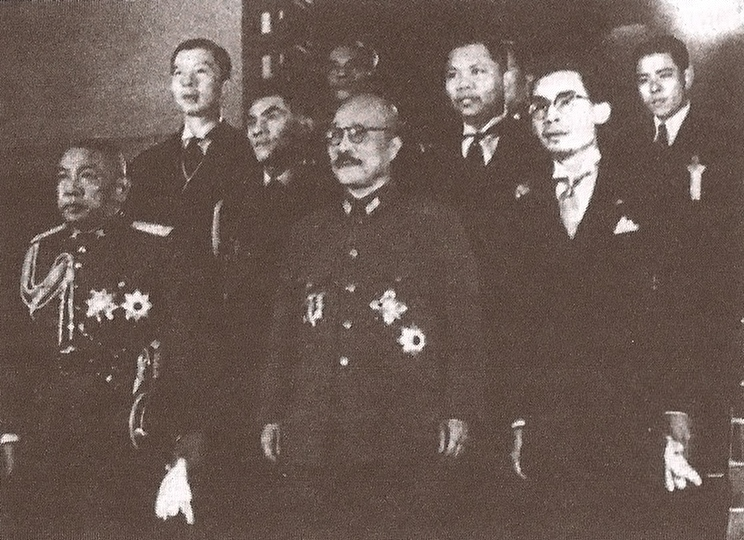
Phot Phahonyothin (far left), Japanese Prime Minister Hideki Tojo (center), and Thai Minister Direk Jayanama, Tokyo, Japan, 1942

Phibun's decision to sign an armistice with Japan effectively ended Churchill's hopes of forging an alliance with Thailand. Phibun also granted Japan permission to use Thailand as a base of operations to invade neighbouring Malaya. Within hours after the armistice came into effect, squadrons of Japanese aircraft had flown into Songkla airfield from Indochina, allowing them to carry out air raids on strategic bases in Malaya and Singapore from a short distance.

On 14 December, Phibun signed a secret agreement with the Japanese committing Thai troops in the Malayan campaign and Burma campaign. An alliance between Thailand and Japan was formally signed on 21 December 1941. On 25 January 1942, the Thai government declared war on the United States and the United Kingdom. In response, all Thai assets in the United States were frozen by the federal government. While the Thai ambassador in London delivered the declaration of war to the British administration, Seni Pramoj, Thai ambassador to Washington, D.C., refused to do so, instead organising the Free Thai Movement.

== See also ==
- Bombing of Bangkok
- Operation Krohcol

== Bibliography ==
- Akashi, Yōji; Yoshimura, Mako (2008). New Perspectives on the Japanese Occupation in Malaya and Singapore 1941–1945. NUS Press. ISBN 9789971692995.
- Akira, Iriye (1999). Pearl Harbor and the coming of the Pacific War: a Brief History with Documents and Essays. Boston: Bedford/St. Martin's. ISBN 0312218184.
- Brecher, Michael; Wilkenfeld, Jonathan (1997). A Study of Crisis. University of Michigan Press. ISBN 978-0472108060.
- Christie, Clive J (1998). Southeast Asia in the Twentieth Century: A Reader. London: Tauris. ISBN 9781860640636.
- Churchill, Winston (1950). The Grand Alliance. The Second World War. Vol. II. London: Cassell & Co Ltd. OCLC 1507134454.
- Cressman, Robert (2000). That Gallant Ship U.S.S. Yorktown (CV-5) (4th printing ed.). Missoula, Montana: Pictorial Histories Publishing Company. ISBN 0-933126-57-3.
- Grant, Ian Lyall; Tamayama, Kazuo (1999). Burma 1942: The Japanese Invasion. Chichester: The Zampi Press. ISBN 0952108313.
- McClain, James L. (2002). Japan: A Modern History. New York: W.W. Norton. ISBN 0-393-04156-5.
- Reynolds, E. Bruce (1994). Thailand and Japan's Southern Advance 1940–1945. Boston: St. Martin's Press.
- Sheehan, Sean (2004). World War II. The Pacific. London: Franklin Watts. ISBN 978-0-7496-5448-1.
- Thavenot, A. F. (1942). "Thailand and the Japanese Invasion". Journal of the Royal Central Asian Society. 29 (2): 111–19. doi:10.1080/03068374208731053.
- Toland, John (1970). The Rising Sun: The Decline and Fall of the Japanese Empire 1936–1945. New York: Random House. ISBN 0-304-93805-X.
- Tucker, Spencer C, ed. (2011). "Franco-Thai war (November 1940 – January 1941)". World War II at Sea: An Encyclopedia. ABC-CLIO. ISBN 9781598844573.
- Willmott, H P (1982). The IAI – the initial Japanese attack. Empires in the Balance. London: Orbis Publishing. ISBN 1591149487.
- Woodward, Llewellyn (1971). British Foreign Policy in World War II. History of World War II. London: Her Majesty's Stationery Office. OCLC 98588.
- Yenne, Bill (2014). The Imperial Japanese Army: The Invincible Years 1941–42. Oxford: Osprey Publishing. ISBN 978-1-78200-932-0.
