= USS Trout (SS-202) =

Tambor-class submarine of the United States Navy

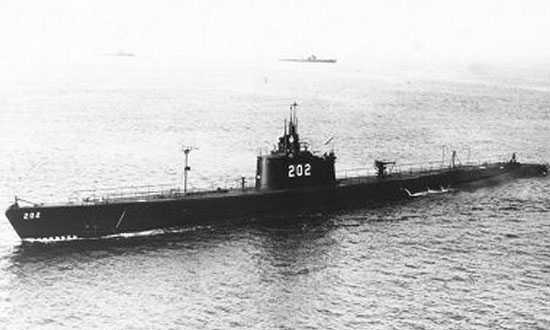
- USS Trout (SS-202)

History

United States
- Name: USS Trout
- Builder: Portsmouth Naval Shipyard, Kittery, Maine
- Laid down: 8 August 1939
- Launched: 21 May 1940
- Commissioned: 15 November 1940
- Fate: Lost northwest of the Philippines around 29 February 1944

General characteristics
- Class & type: Tambor-class diesel-electric submarine
- Displacement: 1,475 long tons (1,499 t) standard, surfaced; 2,370 tons (2,408 t) submerged
- Length: 307 ft 2 in (93.62 m)
- Beam: 27 ft 3 in (8.31 m)
- Draft: 14 ft 7 1/2 in (4.458 m)
- Propulsion: 4 × Fairbanks-Morse Model 38D8-⅛ 9-cylinder opposed piston diesel engines driving electrical generators; 2 × 126-cell Sargo batteries; 4 × high-speed General Electric electric motors with reduction gears; two propellers; 5,400 shp (4.0 MW) surfaced; 2,740 shp (2.0 MW) submerged
- Speed: 20.4 knots (38 km/h) surfaced; 8.75 knots (16 km/h) submerged
- Range: 11,000 nautical miles (20,000 km) at 10 knots (19 km/h)
- Endurance: 48 hours at 2 knots (3.7 km/h) submerged
- Test depth: 250 ft (76 m)
- Complement: 6 officers, 54 enlisted
- Armament: 10 × 21-inch (533 mm) torpedo tubes; 6 forward, 4 aft; 24 torpedoes; 1 × 3-inch (76 mm) / 50 caliber deck gun; Bofors 40 mm and Oerlikon 20 mm cannon

USS Trout (SS-202) was the fifth Tambor-class submarine commissioned in the United States Navy, serving in the Pacific from 1941 to 1944. She received 11 battle stars for World War II service and Presidential Unit Citation for her second, third, and fifth war patrols. Trout also delivered ammunition to the besieged American forces on Corregidor and brought out 20 tons of gold bars and silver pesos from the Philippine currency reserve to Pearl Harbor. During 1941, she was used as a target by a series of tests determining the vulnerability of submarines to depth-charge attacks.

Trout is credited with sinking 12 enemy ships for 37,144 tons according to JANAC records. During her first 10 war patrols, she made 32 torpedo attacks, firing 85 torpedoes, including 34 hits, five confirmed premature detonations, five confirmed duds, and 25 suspected duds. She was also involved in six surface battle actions and was attacked with depth charges eight times.

She was reported overdue on 17 April 1944 and presumed lost with all hands on her 11th war patrol. Of the 12 Tambor-class submarines, only five survived the war.

== Origins ==
Trout was the first ship of the United States Navy (UNN) to be named for the trout, any of certain small, freshwater fishes, highly esteemed by anglers as gamefish, their rich and finely flavored flesh, and their handsome (usually mottled or speckled) coloration. Her keel was laid down on 28 August 1939 by the Portsmouth Navy Yard in Kittery, Maine. She was launched on 21 May 1940, sponsored by Mrs. Walter B. Woodson, and commissioned on 15 November 1940, with Lieutenant Commander Frank Wesley "Mike" Fenno, Jr., as captain.

== Initial operations ==
On 2 July 1941, following "shakedown" operations along the East Coast, Trout and sister ship Triton (SS-201) departed New York City, bound for the Pacific. After transiting the Panama Canal and stopping at San Diego, California, the submarines arrived at Pearl Harbor on 4 August 1941, where she was assigned to Submarine Squadron 6 with others of her class.

Trout conducted training operations with Submarine Division 62 until 29 November when she departed Pearl Harbor to conduct a simulated war patrol off Midway Island.

== Wartime operations ==
=== First patrol — America enters the war ===
On her defensive station, Trout patrolled submerged during daylight to avoid detection by ships or aircraft. On the morning of 7 December, she received word of the Japanese attack on Pearl Harbor. That night, the surfaced submarine observed two destroyers shell Midway Island. She was about 10 miles distant and proceeded toward the enemy ships at full speed, but they retired before she arrived. Frustrated in being unable to fire a shot, she continued her now-unrestricted war patrol until 20 December 1941, when Fenno returned the ship to Pearl Harbor.

=== Second patrol — to the Philippines ===
On 12 January 1942, Trout stood out of Pearl Harbor with 3500 rounds of 3" AAA ammunition to be delivered to the besieged American forces on Corregidor. She topped off with fuel at Midway on 16 January and continued westward. On 27 January, near the Bonin Islands, she sighted a light off her port bow, closed to 1,500 yards (1,400 m) of the vessel, and fired a stern torpedo, which missed. She closed to 600 yards (550 m), discovered that her target was a submarine chaser, and as she had been warned to avoid small ships, resumed her course for the Philippines. On 3 February, Trout met with PT-34 off Corregidor and was escorted through its minefields to its South Dock.

Trout unloaded her ammunition cargo, refueled, loaded two torpedoes, and requested additional ballast. Since neither sandbags nor sacks of concrete were available, she was given 20 tons of gold bars and silver pesos to be evacuated from the Philippines. The specie came from 12 Philippine banks emptied of their assets, absent the paper money, all of which had been burned to prevent it from falling into Japanese hands. She also loaded securities, mail, and United States Department of State dispatches before submerging shortly before daybreak to wait at the bottom in Manila Bay until the return of darkness. That evening, the submarine was loaded with more mail and securities before she was escorted to open water. Trout set a course for the East China Sea, which she entered on 10 February.

That afternoon, Trout launched a torpedo at a freighter from a range of 2,000 yards (1,800 m), but missed. The submarine then closed the target before firing two more, which both hit the freighter. About 25 minutes later, her sonar heard four explosions that were the boilers of Chuwa Maru blowing up as she sank. That evening, Trout was returning through the Bonin Islands when she sighted a light. She changed course, closed the range to 3,000 yards (2,700 m), and launched two torpedoes at the ship. Both missed. In the time that lapsed between firing the first and the second torpedoes, an enemy torpedo passed down Trout's port side. As the submarine went to 120 feet (37 m), another torpedo passed overhead. Trout came up to periscope depth and fired a third torpedo at the target and blew it up. Sound picked up another ship running at full speed, butTrout had no opportunity to attack it. She was credited with sinking a small patrol ship around 200 tons. When she reached Pearl Harbor on 3 March 1942, the submarine transferred her valuable ballast to the cruiser Detroit.

Trout received a Presidential Unit Citation for this patrol. Fenno received both the Navy Cross and Army Distinguished Service Cross, and all crew members were awarded the Army Silver Star by the Hawaiian Department commanding general, Delos C. Emmons, in a shipboard ceremony on 18 March 1942.

=== Third patrol — into Japanese waters ===
The submarine's third war patrol, conducted from 24 March to 17 May 1942, took her to Japanese home waters. On 9 April, Trout was patrolling between Ichie-Zaki and Shioni-Misaki, when she sighted two small cargo ships. She launched two torpedoes at each target, but all missed. The next day, she launched one torpedo at a small steamer and missed again. On 11 April, she attacked a large freighter with two torpedoes. One hit the target but did not sink it. Between 16 April and 23 April, Trout provided cover for the Doolittle Raid task force. Finally, on 24 April, the submarine hit a 10,000-ton tanker with two torpedoes off Cape Shiono, and it headed for the beach. A sweep of the periscope showed a cargo ship going to the aid of the tanker. Trout launched one torpedo and missed. She then closed to 500 yards (460 m) and fired another torpedo that hit with a tremendous explosion. When last seen, the cargo ship, too, was heading for shallow water. Four days later, the submarine attacked a 1,000-ton patrol vessel or minesweeper with a torpedo, which sank it in two minutes. On 30 April, Trout attacked two ships off Shimo Misaki, but missed with both. On 2 May, the submarine sank the 5014-ton cargo ship Uzan Maru. Two days later, she fired a spread of two torpedoes at what was thought to be a freighter. The first torpedo missed, but the second hit forward of the bridge, sinking the converted gunboat Kongōsan Maru. The submarine was then subjected to a six-hour depth-charge attack before she could clear the area.

For this patrol, Trout received her second Presidential Unit Citation and Fenno his second award of the Navy Cross.

=== 4th patrol — Task Group 7.1 ===
Trout stood out of Pearl Harbor on 21 May 1942, as a unit of Task Group 7.1, the Midway Island Patrol Group consisting of 12 submarines. Her station was south of the island, as nine of the submarines were positioned fan-like to the west of Midway in preparation for the Japanese attack. At 08:12 on 4 June, Trout sighted a Japanese fighter plane preparing to attack from astern. She went deep and heard a series of light explosions. On 9 June, Trout passed through a large oil slick and some debris before rescuing two Japanese from a large wooden hatch cover. She returned to Pearl Harbor on 14 June without firing a torpedo and began a major refit that included installation of search radars and JP sonar in preparation for deployment to Australia. The Trout also carried two prisoners of war (Chief Radioman Hatsuichi Yoshida and Fireman 3rd Class Kenichi Ishikawa) from the sunken Japanese cruiser Mikuma.

=== Fifth patrol — the South Pacific ===
On 27 August,Trout, now under the command of Lt. Cdr. Lawson Paterson "Red" Ramage, proceeded to Australia via the Marshall and Caroline Islands. She began patrolling the southern approaches to Truk on 7 September and was detected by three patrol craft on 10 September, apparently triangulating her position using radar. Forced to go deep for one-and-a-half hours, Trout was attacked by 45 depth charges. The next day, she sighted a large transport, but escorts forced her to go deep and clear the area. On 21 September, the submarine fired three stern torpedoes at a naval auxiliary. The first torpedo broke the ship in half and the next two hit the aft section. The victim was subsequently identified as Koei Maru, a converted net tender of 900 tons. A week later, Trout picked up a carrier group consisting of an escort carrier, two cruisers, and two destroyers. The submarine closed to 1,500 yards (1,400 m) and fired a spread of five torpedoes. She heard two timed explosions and saw the carrier Taiyō slow, with smoke pouring out of her starboard side near the water line. Trout heard high-speed screws approaching and went to 200 feet (61 m) as a pattern of 10 depth charges shook her severely.

On 3 October, with one week remaining in her patrol area, Trout approached to reconnoiter Otta Pass, the southern deepwater entrance to Truk Lagoon. Six miles west of South Islands, she came to periscope depth to obtain a navigational fix. Just as the periscope was lowered, a violent explosion close aboard shook the ship violently. The entire crew was stunned by the shock. One man was thrown from his bunk, and another was knocked off his feet. Trout emergency dived to 150 feet (46 m). As she passed 80 feet (24 m) on the way down, another bomb exploded without effect. Since both periscopes were out of commission, the submarine headed for Brisbane for emergency repairs and arrived at Capricorn Wharf, New Farm, on 13 October 1942.

Trout received her third Presidential Unit Citation for this patrol.

=== Sixth patrol — the Solomon Islands ===
Trout's sixth war patrol began on 26 October 1942 and took her to waters around the New Georgia Islands. On 13 November, she was patrolling 80 miles (130 km) north of Indispensable Strait, when she was ordered to intercept the Kongō-class battleship Kirishima en route to shell Henderson Field on Guadalcanal. On the morning of 14 November, Trout located Kirishima and her escort force in the process of refueling, but was unable to maneuver into an attack position. Stalking the force, Trout attacked when the Japanese came under air attack in the afternoon and fired a spread of five torpedoes with a depth setting of 25 feet (7.6 m); all missed or failed to detonate and she cleared the area. The patrol ended when the submarine returned to Brisbane 10 days later.

After provisioning and off-loading her torpedoes, Trout departed Brisbane on 25 November for Fremantle, Western Australia, where her squadron was then based, arriving 2 December 1942.

=== Seventh patrol — Borneo ===
On 29 December 1942, Trout stood out to sea to patrol the South China Sea off North Borneo. The submarine contacted a large tanker off Miri on 11 January 1943 and launched three torpedoes from a range of 2,000 yards (1,800 m). The first two hit the target amidships, but the third exploded prematurely. Four minutes later, a heavy explosion was heard from the direction of the target. Since postwar examination of Japanese records shows no sinking, the damaged ship must have managed to get back to port.

Ten days later off Indochina, Trout launched two torpedoes at a cargo ship from 700 yards (640 m) and watched as the unidentified ship sank immediately. On 29 January, the submarine launched three torpedoes at a destroyer believed to be the Thai Phra Ruang (the former R-class destroyer HMS Radiant) and watched each run true to the target. However, all proved to be duds. On 7 February, she sighted tanker Nisshin Maru No. 2 moored off Lutong, Borneo. She made a submerged approach, launched two torpedoes at the target, heard one explosion, and observed smoke rise from the stern of the tanker. However, no sinking upon this occasion was confirmed. The Nisshin Maru No. 2 was then towed and scrapped South of Ishigaki Island on 16 April 1943.

One week later, Trout launched two torpedoes at what she thought to be a tanker as it emerged from a rain squall. The first torpedo blew off the target's bow, but the second was a dud. As the enemy ship was still steaming at 8 knots, the submarine surfaced for battle with her deck guns. Trout opened fire, but soon seven of her men were wounded by enemy machine-gun fire. She then swung around and fired a stern torpedo and watched Hirotama Maru turn her stern straight up with her screws still turning and slip under the waves. The patrol ended when the submarine returned to Fremantle on 25 February 1943.

=== Eighth patrol — laying mines ===
Trout was next ordered to plant naval mines in Api Passage, off the northwest coast of Borneo. She got underway on 22 March 1943, and on 4 April, while en route from Balabac Strait to Miri, she fired a spread of three torpedoes at a naval auxiliary. One hit the target amidships, raising a 20-foot (6 m) plume of water into the air, but the warhead did not explode. Trout fired a fourth torpedo, but the ship saw its wake, turned, and dodged it. The next day, Trout launched three torpedoes at another ship with no results. She planted 23 naval mines in Api Passage on 7 and 8 April and then began patrolling the Singapore trade route. On 19 April, she launched four torpedoes at a freighter, but scored no hits. Later in the day, she fired a spread of three torpedoes at a tanker and missed. Trout sighted two trawlers on 23 April and battle surfaced. Her deck guns soon stopped the first ship dead in the water and set it on fire; she then turned the second one into a burning wreck. Since only one torpedo remained, the submarine headed for Fremantle, where she arrived on 3 May 1943.

=== Ninth patrol — special missions ===
The Trout was now under the command of her former executive officer, Lt. Cdr. Albert Hobbs Clark, a "plank owner" (member of original ship's complement). From 27 May to 20 July 1943, Trout performed a special mission during an offensive war patrol to the southern Philippines. On 9 June, she missed a transport with three torpedoes. She then landed a five-man U.S. Army team at Labangan, Mindanao. On 15 July, the submarine fired a three-torpedo spread, which destroyed the tanker Sanraku Maru. She contacted three small coastal steamers on 26 June and sank two of them with her deck guns. On 1 July, she sank Isuzu Maru with four torpedoes. Eight days later, Trout picked up a party of five American officers, including Lt. Cdr. Charles "Chick" Parsons and USAAF Lt. Col. William E. Dyess at Pagadian Bay on Mindanao and headed for Fremantle.

=== 10th patrol — sub to sub ===
Trout stood out to sea on 12 August to patrol the Surigao Strait and San Bernardino Strait en route back to Pearl Harbor. On 25 August, she battled a cargo-fisherman with her deck guns and then sent a boarding party on board the Japanese vessel. After they had returned to the submarine with the prize's crew, papers, charts, and other material for study by intelligence officers, the submarine sank the vessel. Three of the five prisoners were later embarked in a dinghy off Tifore Island.

On 9 September, she fired three bow tubes at a Kaidai-class submarine off Surigao Strait. About 35 seconds later, a loud explosion apparently stopped the target's screws. Trout's sound crew reported a torpedo approaching her port beam, and she went to 100 feet (30 m). After she heard a second explosion, Trout came to periscope level, but found no sign of submarine she had sunk. On 22 September, one of the remaining Japanese prisoners died of self-imposed starvation and was buried at sea.

The next day, the submarine sighted two ships with an escort. One was a freighter with a deck-load of planes, and the other was a passenger-cargo ship. Trout fired a spread of three torpedoes at each of the targets. She saw and heard two hits on each. The freighter Ryotoku Maru sank stern first. Though depth charged afterwards and kept down for five hours, Trout surfaced and gave chase to the damaged transport, finding and attacking it with three more torpedoes before her escort could return.

As the transport was being abandoned, Trout proceeded close aboard and passed 12 to 15 life boats. The enemy ship was ablaze and low in the water with her bow nearly awash. Sound heard a heavy explosion from Yamashiro Maru, and 7 minutes later, Trout could see no trace of her. That night, the submarine set a course for Hawaii and arrived at Pearl Harbor on 4 October 1943.

The submarine was then routed back to the United States for a modernization overhaul at the Mare Island Navy Yard that included a complete rebuild of her conning tower, reduction of her silhouette by cutting down the fairwater, replacement of the 3"/50 deck gun with a larger 4 in (100 mm) piece, and installation of 18 additional bunks. She was ready for sea in January 1944 and returned to Submarine Division 162 at Pearl Harbor late that month.

=== Final patrol and loss ===
On 8 February 1944, the submarine began her 11th and final war patrol. Trout topped off with fuel at Midway Island, and on 16 February, took a great circle route toward the East China Sea.

Japanese records examined after the war indicate that one of their convoys, Matsu No. 1, was attacked by a submarine on 29 February 1944 in the patrol area assigned to Trout. Carrying the 29th Infantry Division of the Kwantung Army from Manchuria to Guam, Matsu No. 1 consisted of four large transports escorted by three Yūgumo-class destroyers of Destroyer Division 31: Asashimo, Kishinami, and Okinami. The submarine badly damaged one large passenger-cargo ship and sank the 7,126-ton transport Sakito Maru, which was carrying the Japanese 18th Infantry Regiment, including one of the subsequent Japanese holdouts Sakae Ōba. Asashimo detected the submarine and dropped 19 depth charges. Oil and debris came to the surface and the destroyer dropped a final depth charge on that spot, at the position 22°40′N 131°45′E. The submarine was using Mk. XVIII electric torpedoes, and one of those might have made a circular run and sunk the boat, as happened with Tang.

According to the US Navy Muster Reports in the National Archives, on 7 April 1944, Trout was declared presumed Missing in Action with all 81 hands. On 8 April 1945, Trout was declared presumed lost with all 81 hands, including Clark and his executive officer, Lt. Harry Eades Woodworth, both of whom had made all 11 war patrols.

== In culture ==
Trout is the subject of the second episode of the syndicated television anthology series The Silent Service. The episode entitled "The Trout at the Rainbow's End" aired 5 April 1957, and was about the Corregidor mission.
