= Frank Wesley Fenno Jr. =

US Navy officer

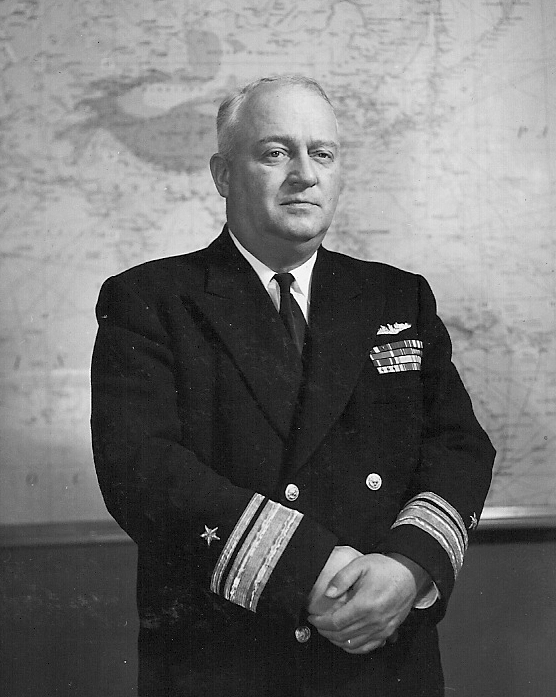
- Born: September 11, 1902; Westminster, MA
- Died: August 16, 1973 (aged 70); Bethesda, MD
- Burial place: Arlington National Cemetery
- Spouse: Avis Ann Cochran
- Military career
- Allegiance: United States of America
- Branch: United States Navy
- Service years: 1925-1962
- Rank: Rear Admiral
- Nickname: "Mike"
- Service number: 59550
- Commands: USS S-45 (SS-156); USS Trout (SS-202); USS Runner (SS-275); Guantanamo Bay Naval Base; United States Taiwan Defense Command
- Conflicts: World War II; Korean War
- Awards: Distinguished Service Cross; Navy Cross (3); Silver Star; Legion of Merit (2)

Frank Wesley Fenno Jr. (March 15, 1909 – August 16, 1973) was a highly decorated officer in the United States Navy with the rank of Rear Admiral. An accomplished submarine commander during World War II, Fenno was awarded numerous military honors for his service, including the Distinguished Service Cross, three Navy Crosses, the Silver Star, and two Legion of Merit medals.

== Early life and education ==
Fenno was born March 15, 1909, in Westminster, Massachusetts. He attended Fitchburg High School before continuing his studies at the University of Maine. In 1921, he entered the U.S. Naval Academy, from which he graduated in 1925.

== Career ==
=== Early career ===
Fenno graduated from the Naval Academy in 1925, marking the beginning of his naval career. He initially served at the Boston Navy Yard and subsequently joined the crew of the USS Utah (BB-31) and later the USS Florida (BB-30). Fenno's dedication and talent caught the attention of his superiors, and he was selected to attend the submarine training course at New London, Connecticut.

After completing the submarine training course, Fenno was assigned to the USS S-37 (SS-142) and later served on the USS S-31 (SS-136). These early assignments provided him with valuable experience in submarine operations and laid the foundation for his future achievements.

=== World War II ===
During World War II, Rear Admiral Frank Wesley Fenno Jr. played a significant role in submarine operations. Fenno served as the commanding officer of the submarines USS Trout (SS-202) and USS Runner (SS-275).

At the start of the war, Fenno was serving as the commanding officer of the USS Trout and led her on her first four war patrols. However, it was during the Trout's second war patrol that Fenno embarked on an unusual and hazardous mission. He was tasked with delivering much-needed antiaircraft shells to the hard-pressed forces on Corregidor. Recognizing an opportunity to further contribute to the war effort, Fenno devised a plan. In addition to delivering the ammunition, the Trout would pick up a load of torpedoes and fuel at Corregidor and conduct a patrol through Formosa Strait and the lower reaches of the East China Sea on its way back to Pearl Harbor.

To facilitate the mission, Fenno removed most of the torpedoes and ballast from the submarine and loaded the Trout with 3,517 3-inch (76 mm) antiaircraft shells. The submarine successfully delivered the ammunition to Corregidor but encountered a unique challenge. Fenno needed additional ballast to replace what had been removed in Pearl Harbor, but sandbags, the usual substitute, were vital to the defense of Corregidor. Instead, he was offered twenty tons of gold and silver that had been evacuated from Manila banks for safekeeping. Under Fenno's careful supervision, the precious cargo was transferred to the Trout during the night, with five hundred and eighty-three gold bars and eighteen tons of silver coins stacked in the bilges. Fenno signed a receipt acknowledging the transfer.

After departing Corregidor, the Trout passed through the East China Sea, during which Fenno engaged and sank an enemy freighter, Chuwa Maru, using three torpedoes. Continuing their journey, near the Bonin Islands, Fenno fired three torpedoes at another small patrol vessel, successfully destroying it. The Trout safely returned to Pearl Harbor after a successful patrol.

Admiral Withers hailed Fenno as a hero, and the rescue of the gold and silver garnered positive attention during a time when good news was desperately needed. In recognition of his exceptional leadership and service, President Roosevelt directed that Fenno be awarded the Army Distinguished Service Cross, while the rest of the crew received the Army Silver Star Medal.

The Trout's second war patrol was later dramatized in the television series The Silent Service in 1957. Fenno was portrayed by actor Robert Karnes and made a personal appearance at the end of the episode to discuss his account of the patrol.

Fenno's exceptional performance as the commanding officer of the Trout following his second war patrol led to him receiving two additional Navy Crosses. He also earned a third Navy Cross for his successful war patrol while commanding the USS Runner.

In addition to his submarine commands, Fenno served as Commander of a coordinated attack group of submarines from May to June 1944 called "Fenno's Ferrets", earning the Silver Star for his leadership role.

Fenno later commanded Submarine Division 201 and Submarine Squadron 24 from September 1943 to September 1945. His executive and administrative abilities significantly contributed to the success of these units, for which he was awarded the Legion of Merit.

=== Post-World War II ===
After World War II, Fenno continued his naval career. He served as Commander of the U.S. Naval Base in Guantanamo Bay, Cuba, from November 1958 to October 1960. His leadership during this period of political tension and instability in Cuba earned him a second Legion of Merit.

Fenno retired from the Navy with the rank of Rear Admiral.

== Death ==
Fenno died on August 16, 1973. He is buried at Arlington National Cemetery.
