= Japanese seaplane tender Sanuki Maru =

History

Empire of Japan
- Name: Sanuki Maru
- Namesake: Sanuki Province
- Owner: Nippon Yusen K.K.
- Port of registry: Tokyo, Japan
- Builder: Mitsubishi Shipbuilding & Engineering, Nagasaki
- Yard number: 724
- Laid down: 29 August 1938
- Launched: 8 February 1939
- Completed: 1 May 1939

Imperial Japanese Navy
- Name: Sanuki Maru
- Acquired: requisitioned by Imperial Japanese Navy, 17 August 1941
- Commissioned: 5 September 1941
- Stricken: 10 March 1945
- Fate: Sunk, 28 January 1945
- Notes: Call sign: JGBN

General characteristics
- Class & type: Type S cargo ship
- Type: seaplane tender
- Tonnage: 7,158 GRT (1939), 9,246 GRT (1941); 3,913 NRT (1939), 5,235 NRT (1941)
- Length: 146.2 m (480 ft) (1939); 147.1 m (483 ft) (1941)
- Beam: 19 m (62 ft 4 in)
- Draught: 9.8 m (32 ft) (1939); 12.5 m (41 ft) (1941)
- Propulsion: 2 Mitsubishi-Sulzer diesels, 2 shafts, 6,700 nhp
- Speed: 20 knots
- Armament: 2 x 150-mm/45 cal single mount guns; 2 x 80-mm single mount guns; 2 x Type 93 13.2 mm (0.5 in) AA machine guns
- Aircraft carried: 8 x E8N2 "Dave" float biplanes, 2 held in reserve; from 18 December 1941: 6 Mitsubishi F1M "Pete" float biplanes 2 x E8N2 "Dave" float biplanes held in reserve; 2 x 56' catapults

Sanuki Maru (Japanese:讃岐丸) was a 1939-built cargo ship, requisitioned as a seaplane tender by the Imperial Japanese Navy during World War II.

== History ==
She was laid down on 29 August 1938 at the Nagasaki shipyard of Mitsubishi Shipbuilding & Engineering for the benefit of the Nippon Yusen K.K. and launched on 8 February 1939. She was the second of seven ships of the Type S cargo ship of high speed transports: Sakito Maru, Sado Maru, Sagami Maru, Sagara Maru, Sasako Maru, and Sakura Maru. On 1 May 1939, she was completed and she made several journeys including one to London. On 17 August 1941, she was requisitioned by the Imperial Japanese Navy and began conversion as a seaplane tender. She was fitted with two 150 mm/45 caliber single mount guns, two 80 mm single mount guns, and two 13.2 mm single mount machine guns. Work was completed on 5 September 1941 and she was registered in the Maizuru Naval District with aircraft code IB-xx and call sign JGBN. She was attached to the 2nd Base Force, Third Fleet with Captain Tsuyuki Senji as Commanding Officer. On 2 December 1941, she arrived at Takao, Taiwan where she was outfitted with 8 x E8N2 "Dave" two-seat float biplanes from the Tōkō Naval Air Group. On 7 December 1941, she delivered supplies and munitions to auxiliary gunboats Aso Maru and Nampo Maru and then departed with Patrol Boat No. 1 for Batan Island.

=== Invasion of the Philippines ===
She participated in the invasion of Batan Island, the opening campaign of the invasion of the Philippines, which began simultaneously with the Japanese attack on Pearl Harbor. The occupation force was tasked with establishing an air base to support future operations against American forces on Luzon as Batan Island is equidistance between Taiwan and Luzon. The task force consisted of the destroyer Yamagumo as flagship with Sanuki Maru with its floatplanes to provide reconnaissance and air support along with the 52nd Subchaser division (Shonan Maru No. 17, Takunan Maru No. 5, Fukuei Maru No. 15), the 53rd Subchaser Division (Korei Maru, Kyo Maru No. 2, Kyo Maru No. 11), the 54th Subchaser Division (Nagara Maru, Shonan Maru No. 1, Shonan Maru No. 2), Imperial Japanese Army transport Teiun Maru (carrying part of the 24th Airfield Battalion), Imperial Japanese Navy transport Kumagawa Maru (carrying a 490-man unit of the Sasebo Special Naval Landing Force), four Chidori-class torpedo boats (Chidori, Manazuru, Tomozuru, Hatsukari), two W-13-class minesweepers (W-13, W-14), two patrol boats (Patrol Boat No. 1, Patrol Boat No. 2), two Tsubame-class minelayers (Kamome, Tsubame), three converted gunboats (Aso Maru, Koso Maru, Nampo Maru), and destroyer Tachikaze.

On 8 December 1941, four planes from the Sanuki Maru bombed the airstrip at Basco and the 490 troops of the SNLF landed and quickly secured the existing small airfield outside Basco without resistance. On 9 December, the air corps troops began expansion work to make it suitable for fighters and reconnaissance aircraft with the first planes of the Imperial Japanese Army Air Service 24th and 50th Fighter Regiments landing at Basco that same day. Sanuki Maru then proceeded to Camiguin Island along with the ships of the 3rd Gunboat Division and Patrol Boat No. 1 (which carried a platoon of SNLF). They met no resistance and established a floatplane base to support the pending invasion of Aparri. The destroyer Tachikaze (with a platoon of the Yokosuka SNLF) proceeded to occupy Calayan Island also meeting no resistance. Patrol Boat No. 2 was dispatched to survey Fuga Island but found the terrain too steep to land a ground force. Sanuki Maru remained off Camiguin Island with the gunboat Aso Maru to provide air support for the Japanese landings at Vigan, Aparri, and Gonzaga. Six of her planes were damaged beyond repair due to rough sea conditions and the seaplane base at Camiguin Island was abandoned. On 18 December 1941, she was replenished with 6 Mitsubishi F1M "Pete" floatplanes with her two remaining E8N2 "Dave" floatplanes held in reserve.

She then departed for newly occupied Vigan, Luzon arriving on 21 December 1941 where she helped to establish a seaplane base with fellow seaplane tender Sanyo Maru contributing her 6 F1Ms along with 6 F1Ms and an Aichi E13A "Jake" from the Sanyo Maru and 3 Kawanishi E7K "Alf"s from light cruisers Naka and Natori. The planes went on to support the landings at Lingayen. That same day, she left Vigan heading southward to support the occupations of Jolo and Davao. On 23 December 1941, as she approached Davao, she was hit by American shore batteries but only slightly damaged. After arriving at Davao on the same day, the harbor was attacked by six Netherlands Naval Aviation Service Dornier Do 24 flying boats (squadrons GVT-2 and GVT-5) which damaged the station tanker Tonan Maru No. 2. A F1M from the Sanuki Maru was credited with downing one of the flying boats. She then joined the carrier Ryūjō and fellow seaplane tender Chitose to provided air cover for the Jolo invasion convoy which consisted of four Imperial Japanese Army transports (Havana Maru, Kuretake Maru, Teiryu Maru, Tsuruga Maru) and four Imperial Japanese Navy transports (Koshin Maru, Nichian Maru, Eiko Maru No. 2, unknown maru) carrying 4,000 men of the 56th Mixed Infantry Corps and the Kure No. 1 Special Naval Landing Force. The convoy is escorted by light cruiser Jintsū and four destroyers (Hayashio, Kuroshio, Natsushio, Oyashio). After the successful occupation of Jolo, she returned to Davao and on 6 January 1942, she docked off the west coast of Samal Island.

=== Invasion of Dutch Borneo ===
On 7 January 1942, Sanuki Maru and her fellow seaplane tender Sanyo Maru, provided air cover for the Tarakan invasion convoy which carried the 56th Mixed Infantry Group of Major General Sakaguchi Shizuo (jp:坂口静夫) (known as the Sakaguchi brigade) and the Kure No. 2 Special Naval Landing Force on nine Imperial Japanese Army transports (Tsuruga Maru, Liverpool Maru, Havana Maru, Kuretake Maru, Nichiai Maru, Hiteru Maru, Teiryu Maru, Jankow Maru, Ehime Maru), and five Imperial Japanese Navy transports (Kunikawa Maru, Kano Maru, Kagu Maru, Kokuto Maru, Rakuto Maru). The two seaplane tenders along with three dedicated escorts (Patrol Boat No. 39 and converted fishing boats Kureha Maru No. 3 and Kureha Maru No. 4) joined the main convoy on 9 January 1942 and oversaw the successful occupation of Tarakan on 11 January 1942 (although the Dutch had destroyed the oil fields). On 24 January 1942, the two seaplane tenders provided air cover for the highly successful invasion of Balikpapan, a major oil producing town and port, which carried the same units to Balikpapan, Borneo on 16 transports. Although the Dutch commander ordered the destruction of oil installations in Balikpapan, it was not completed with the only serious damage done was to tanks, pipes and special quays in the harbor area.

On 7 January 1942, Sanuki Maru was attacked by B-17s of the US Air Force. Although there were no direct hits, near misses seriously damaged the hull below the waterline causing the flooding of the first and second holds and necessitating the transfer of all ordinance to Kureha Maru No. 3. On 10 February 1942, she retreated to the base at Balikpapan where the repair ship Yamabiko Maru drew alongside to conduct repairs which were completed on 10 March 1942.

=== Reassignment ===
On 10 March 1942, the Third Fleet was disbanded and Sanuki Maru was assigned to the 3rd Southern Expeditionary Fleet under Rear Admiral Rokuzo Sugiyama.

=== Sinking ===
On 6 January 1945, she departed Moji in convoy Hi-91 headed for Singapore via Sasebo and Takao with transport Kitsurin Maru and tankers Tojo Maru and Eiyo Maru. Her cargo was composed of 52 Type 1 explosive motorboats manned by 167 men of the 43rd Shinyo Squadron and 26 Type 5 explosive motorboat manned by 183 men of the 101st Shinyo Squadron. The convoy was escorted by two destroyers (Nokaze, Kamikaze), two Ukuru-class escort ships (Shonan, Kume), and two Type C escort ships (CD-25, CD-53). On 28 January 1945, while en route to Takao, U.S. submarines Spadefish and Pompon located the convoy in the Yellow Sea northeast of Shanghai. Although two nighttime attacks by Pompon were unsuccessful, it occupied the convoy's escorts enabling Spadefish to draw close and fire three torpedoes at the Sanuki Maru all of which hit sinking her at 33°55′N 122°55′E. The 183 men of the 43rd Shinyo Squadron and 133 men of the 101st Shinyo Squadron were killed. Spadefish also sank Kume killing 89. On 10 March 1945, she was struck from the Navy List.
