= Japanese destroyer Okinami =

Yūgumo-class destroyer

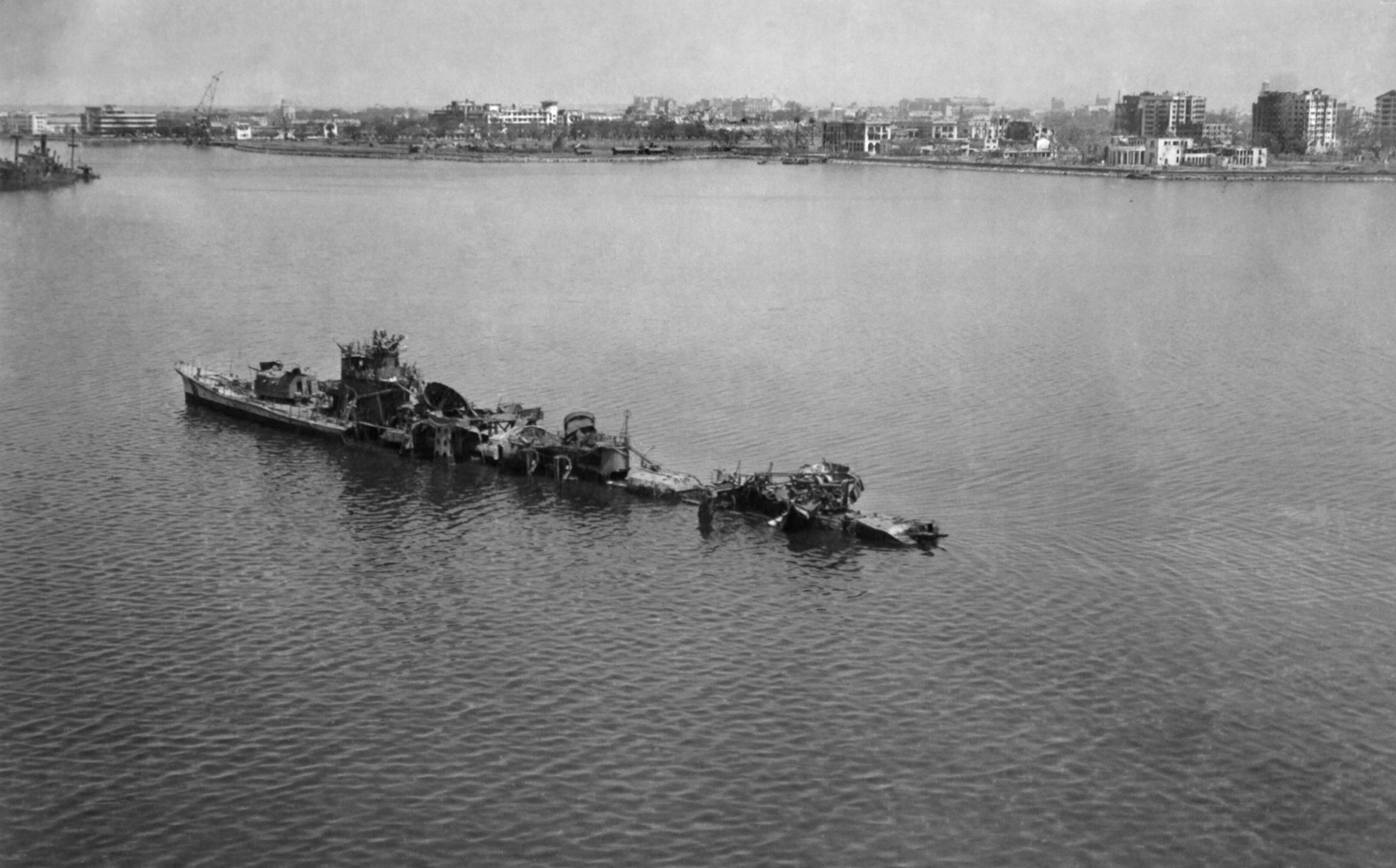
- Okinami wrecked in shallow water after being bombed by US carrier aircraft, 1 February 1945.

History

Empire of Japan
- Name: Okinami
- Builder: Maizuru Naval Arsenal
- Laid down: 15 August 1942
- Launched: 18 July 1943
- Completed: 10 December 1943
- Stricken: 10 January 1945
- Fate: Sunk in action, 13 November 1944

General characteristics
- Class & type: Yūgumo-class destroyer
- Displacement: 2,520 long tons (2,560 t)
- Length: 119.15 m (390 ft 11 in)
- Beam: 10.8 m (35 ft 5 in)
- Draught: 3.75 m (12 ft 4 in)
- Speed: 35 knots (40 mph; 65 km/h)
- Complement: 228
- Armament: 6 × 127 mm (5.0 in)/50 caliber DP guns; up to 28 × Type 96 25 mm (0.98 in) AA guns; up to 4 × 13.2 mm (0.52 in) AA guns; 8 × 610 mm (24 in) torpedo tubes for Type 93 torpedoes; 36 depth charges

Okinami (沖波; "High Seas Waves") was a Yūgumo-class destroyer of the Imperial Japanese Navy.

== Design and description ==
The Yūgumo class was a repeat of the preceding Kagerō class with minor improvements that increased their anti-aircraft capabilities. Their crew numbered 228 officers and enlisted men. The ships measured 119.17 meters (391 ft 0 in) overall, with a beam of 10.8 meters (35 ft 5 in) and a draft of 3.76 meters (12 ft 4 in). They displaced 2,110 metric tons (2,080 long tons) at standard load and 2,560 metric tons (2,520 long tons) at deep load. The ships had two Kampon geared steam turbines, each driving one propeller shaft, using steam provided by three Kampon water-tube boilers. The turbines were rated at a total of 52,000 shaft horsepower (39,000 kW) for a designed speed of 35 knots (65 km/h; 40 mph).

The main armament of the Yūgumo class consisted of six Type 3 127-millimeter (5.0 in) guns in three twin-gun turrets, one superfiring pair aft and one turret forward of the superstructure. The guns were able to elevate up to 75° to increase their ability against aircraft, but their slow rate of fire, slow traversing speed, and the lack of any sort of high-angle fire-control system meant that they were virtually useless as anti-aircraft guns. They were built with four Type 96 25-millimeter (1.0 in) anti-aircraft guns in two twin-gun mounts, but more of these guns were added over the course of the war. The ships were also armed with eight 610-millimeter (24.0 in) torpedo tubes in a two quadruple traversing mounts; one reload was carried for each tube. Their anti-submarine weapons comprised two depth charge throwers for which 36 depth charges were carried.

== Construction and career ==
Okinami saw one of her first active missions escorting a large troop convoy to Saipan and Guam. On 29 February 1944, one of the troop ships, the Sakito Maru, was torpedoed and sunk by the submarine USS Trout. Okinami then swerved to assist the sinking Sakito Maru while the destroyer Asashimo depth charged and sank Trout. Okinami helped to rescue 1,720 survivors, before returning to Japan on March 16.

From March 20-28, Okinami escorted a troop convoy from Yokosuka to Truk, before escorting the troop transport Sanyo Maru to Saipan, followed by escorting a tanker convoy to Balikpapan. Okinami then escorted those same oil tankers to Saipan and back to Balikapapan, before finally escorting the tankers to Tawitawi on May 15. From May 16-19, Okinami steamed to Davao and back to Tawitawi.

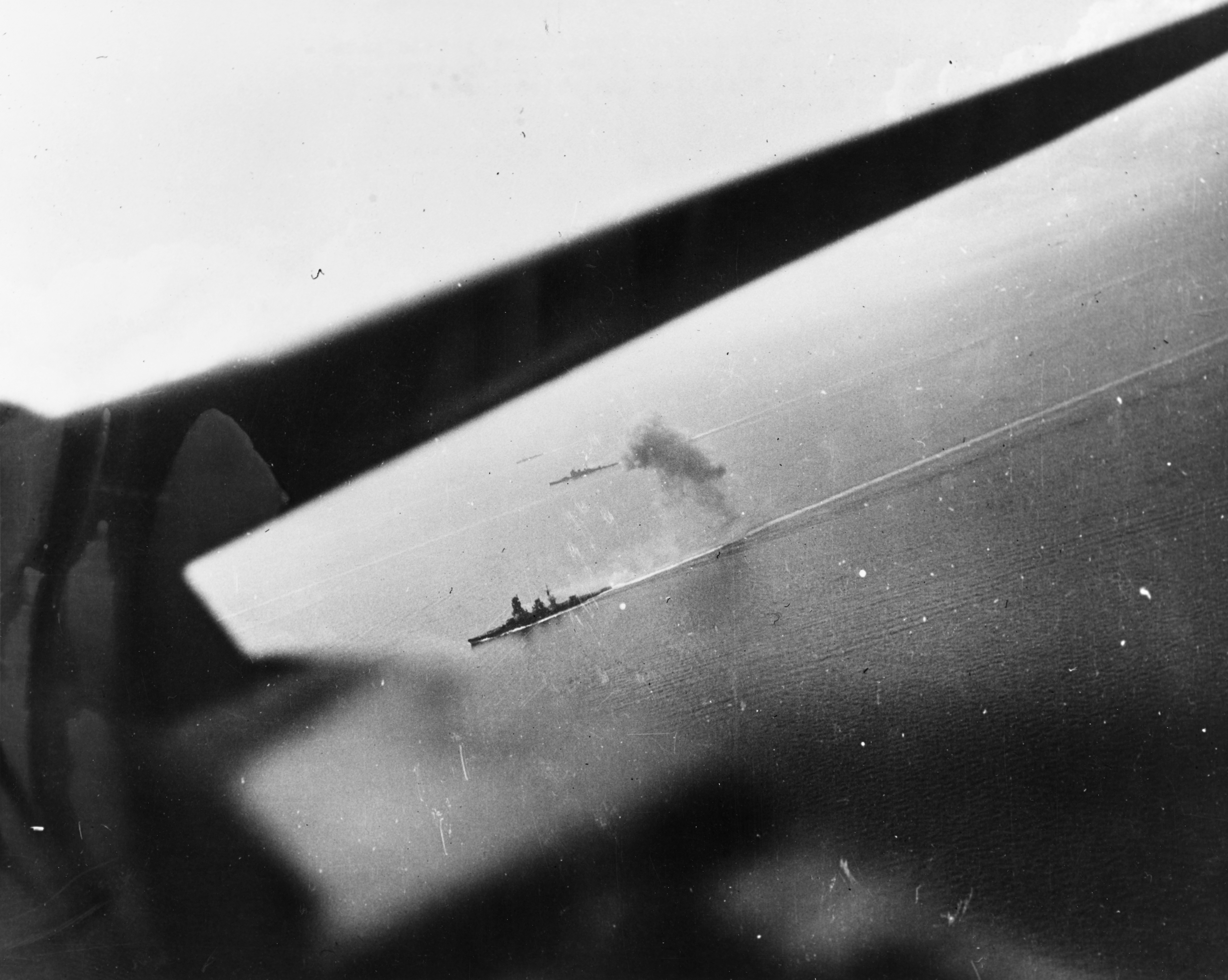
Okinami behind the heavy cruiser Haguro and battleship Nagato, 24 October 1944

On June 10, Okinami steamed from Tawitawi escorting the battleships Yamato and Musashi on a troop transport run. However, on the 13th, the force was ordered to join with Admiral Ozawa's fleet to act as carrier escorts. On June 19-20, the battle of the Philippine Sea commenced, and though heavy fighting commenced in other aspects of the battle, Okinami's force came under relatively light carrier attacks, where she was not damaged, and was present when Yamato mistakenly fired on returning Japanese aircraft, forcing one pilot to ditch his plane.

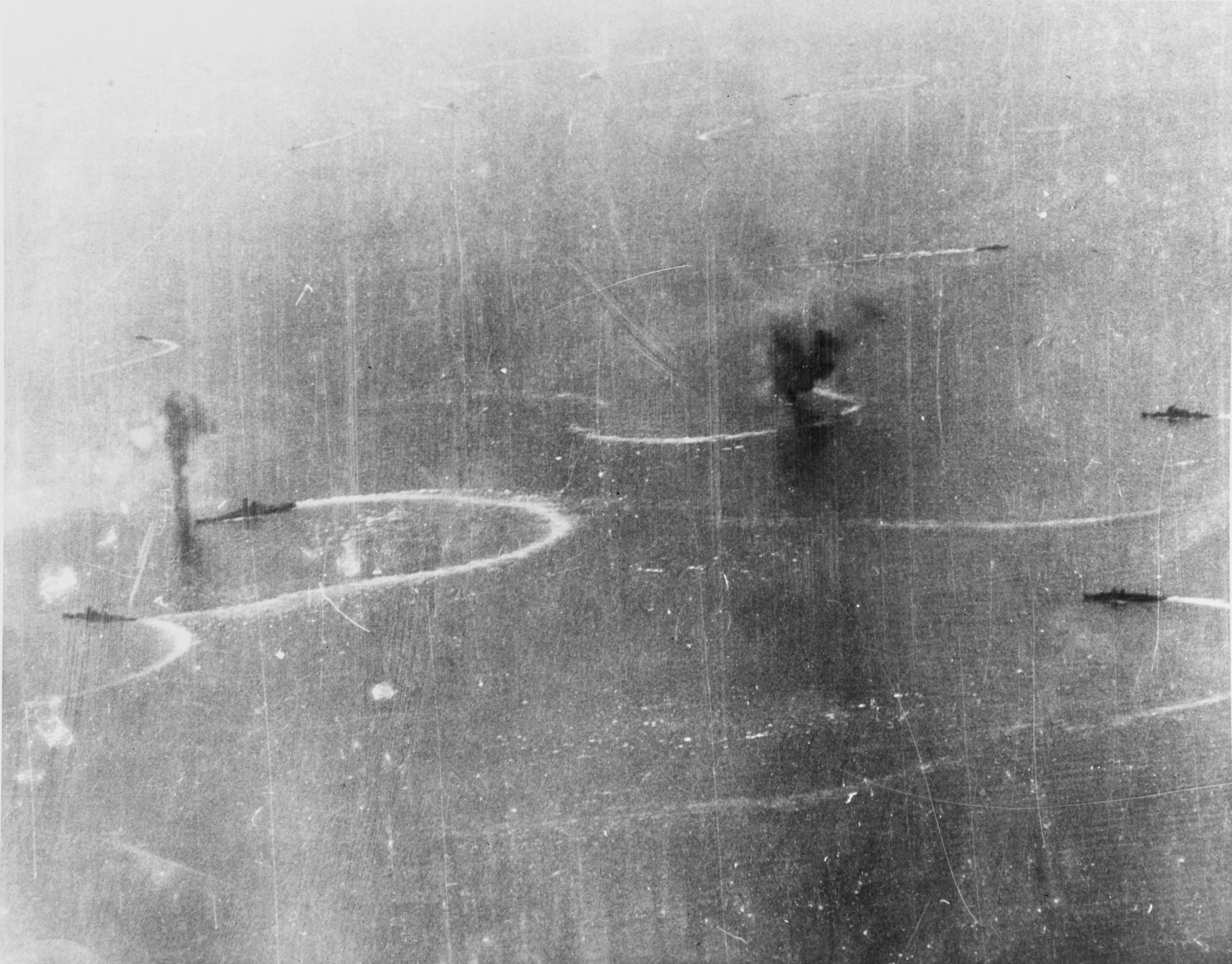
Japanese ships under attack, Okinami is the destroyer in the top left, Fujinami is opposite of her

From July 8-16, Yamato and Musashi finished what they started and transported ground troops to Lingga, bringing Okinami as an escort. After arriving at Lingga, Okinami spent a significant amount of time anchored, only leaving on October 18 to escort Admiral Kurita's fleet to Brunei in preparation for Operation Shō Gō, arriving 2 days later. On October 22, Okinami departed as part of as part of Kurita's centerforce in an attempt to raid American troop convoys destined for the Philippines. After submarine attacks sank and damaged a number of cruisers, Okinami survived the carrier raids during the battle of the Sibuyan Sea, October 24, and survived with only strafing damage, which injured 34 sailors to varying degrees. On the 25th, Okinami served in the battle off Samar, but contributed nothing of note to the battle, before she assisted the sinking heavy cruiser Suzuya, rescuing 416 survivors, before escorting the crippled heavy cruiser Kumano to Manila, arriving on the 28th, finally ending the battle of Leyte Gulf.

From November 1-2, Okinami escorted a troop convoy from Manila to Ormoc, and on 5 November 1944 she was damaged by near misses and strafing during an air attack. There were 28 casualties. On 13 November 1944, Okinami was sunk in a U.S. air raid on Manila. Suffering one direct bomb hit and several near-misses, she sank upright in shallow water 8 miles (13 km) west of Manila at 14°35′N 120°50′E. There were 14 crewmen killed and 19 wounded.

== Gallery ==
Numerous photos were taken of Okinami's wreck in Manila

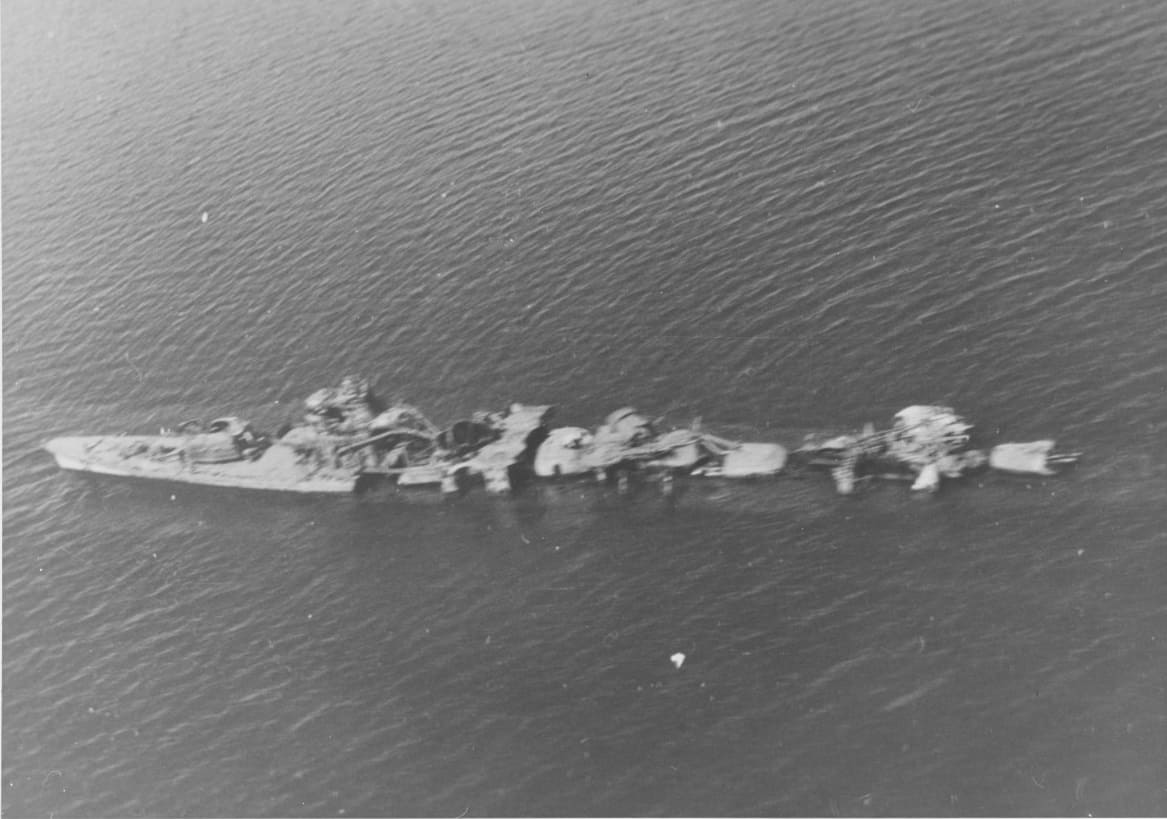

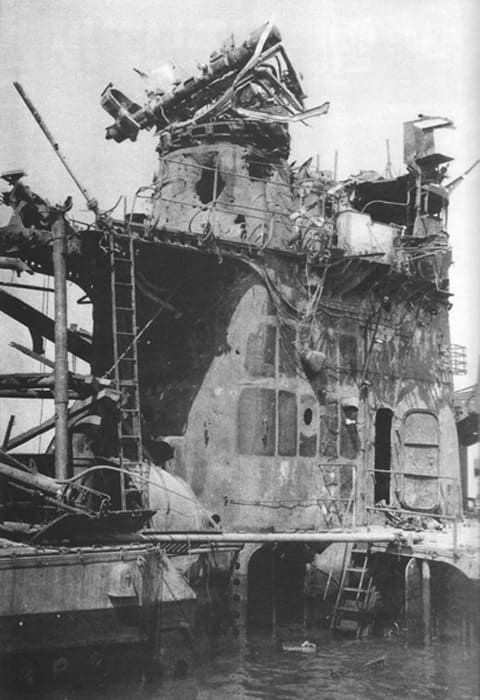

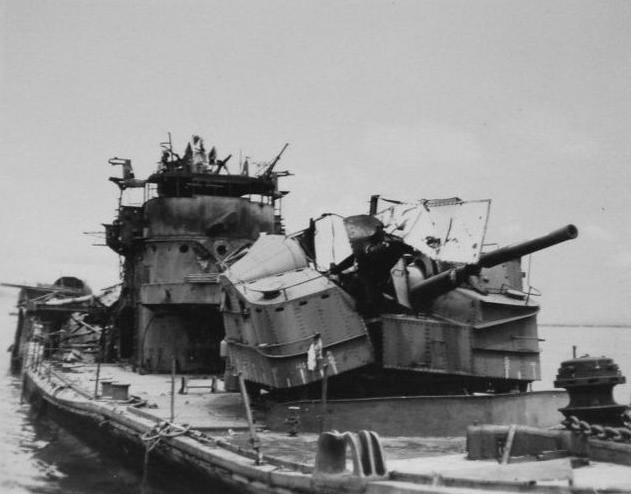

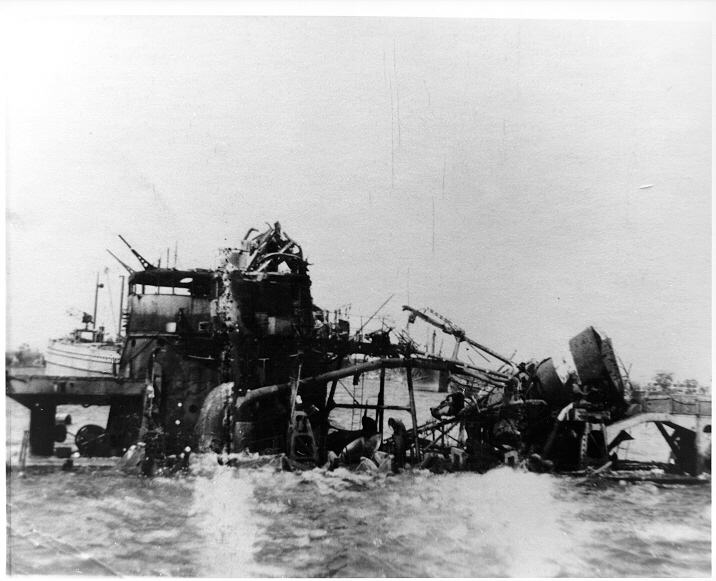
