= Sagara Maru =

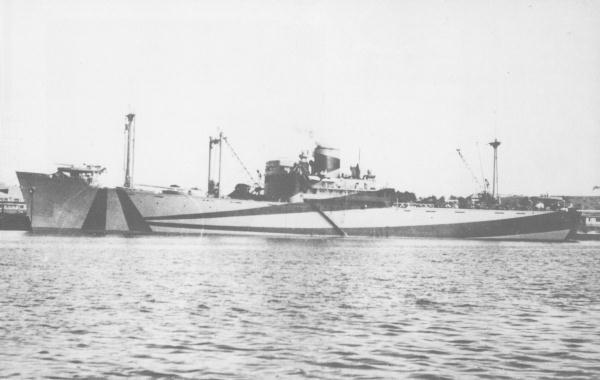
- Sagara Maru in 1942

History

Japan
- Name: Sagara Maru
- Builder: Mitsubishi Shipbuilding
- Launched: 23 March 1939
- Fate: Torpedoed and beached 23 July 1943

General characteristics (as seaplane tender)
- Class & type: Type S cargo ship
- Displacement: 7,189 long tons (7,304 t)
- Length: 479 ft 9 in (146.23 m)
- Beam: 62 ft 4 in (19.00 m)
- Draught: 32 ft 3 in (9.83 m)
- Propulsion: 2 × diesel engines; 2 shafts; 16,000 bhp (12,000 kW)
- Speed: 18 knots (33 km/h; 21 mph)
- Armament: 2 × 14 cm (5.5 in) guns; 2 × 13.2 mm (0.52 in) machine guns
- Aircraft carried: 6 × Mitsubishi F1M; 2 × Nakajima E8N
- Aviation facilities: 2 catapults

Sagara Maru was a Japanese Type S cargo ship cargo liner converted to a seaplane tender that served during World War II. It was hit by torpedoes from two different submarines before being abandoned and sinking.

== Construction and career ==
Sagara Maru was built in 1939 at the Mitsubishi Yokohoma shipyard for the Nippon Yusen company, being completed in 1940. She was the fifth of seven ships of the Type S cargo ship of high speed transports: Sakito Maru (崎戸丸), Sanuki Maru (讃岐丸), Sado Maru (佐渡丸), Sagami Maru (相模丸), Sagara Maru (相良丸), Sasako Maru (笹子丸), and Sakura Maru (佐倉丸).

Shortly before Japan entered into the war, she was acquired by the Imperial Japanese Navy and converted to an auxiliary seaplane tender. After hostilities commenced she was involved in the escort forces for landings at Sabang, Rangoon and the Andaman Islands, and after that spent the majority of her time patrolling and escorting convoys between Penang and Singapore. In December 1942 she was re-classified as a transport/replenishment ship.

On 23 June 1943 off the coast of Omaezaki, Japan she was spotted by USS Harder, who despite being spotted and fired upon managed to fire four torpedoes one of which hit the bow of Sagara Maru. The destroyer Sawakaze took her in tow but to avoid sinking she was beached. Ten days later, on 4 July, before she could be re-floated, USS Pompano spotted her on radar and managed to gain two torpedo hits. She was subsequently abandoned a few days later.
