= Japanese destroyer Kishinami =

Yūgumo-class destroyer

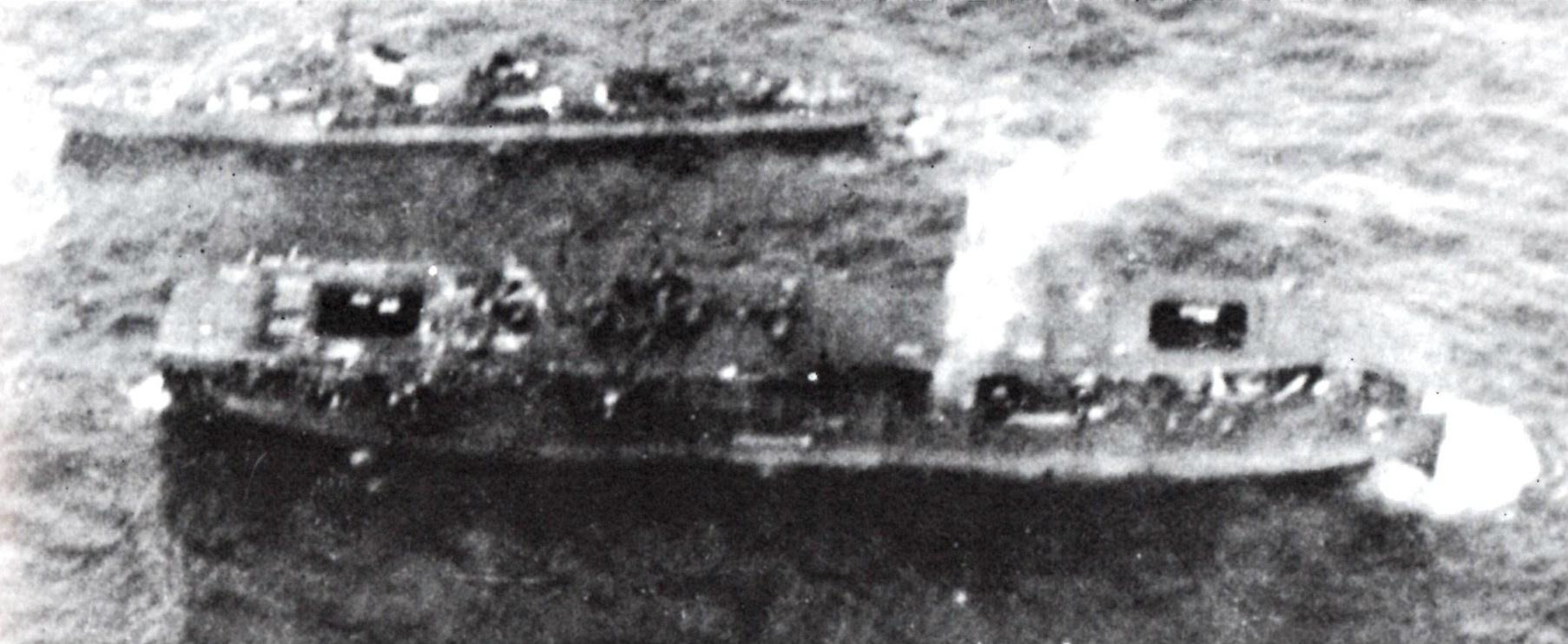
- Kishinami and the escort carrier Un'yō anchored off Yokosuka, 8 February 1944

History

Empire of Japan
- Name: Kishinami
- Builder: Uraga Dock Company
- Launched: 19 August 1943
- Completed: 3 December 1943
- Stricken: 10 January 1945
- Fate: Torpedoed and sunk, 4 December 1944

General characteristics
- Class & type: Yūgumo-class destroyer
- Displacement: 2,520 long tons (2,560 t)
- Length: 119.15 m (390 ft 11 in)
- Beam: 10.8 m (35 ft 5 in)
- Draught: 3.75 m (12 ft 4 in)
- Speed: 35 knots (40 mph; 65 km/h)
- Complement: 228
- Armament: 6 × 127 mm (5.0 in)/50 caliber DP guns; up to 28 × Type 96 25 mm (0.98 in) AA guns; up to 4 × 13.2 mm (0.52 in) AA guns; 8 × 610 mm (24 in) torpedo tubes for Type 93 torpedoes; 36 depth charges

Kishinami (岸波; "Shore Waves") was a Yūgumo-class destroyer of the Imperial Japanese Navy.

== Design and description ==
The Yūgumo class was a repeat of the preceding Kagerō class with minor improvements that increased their anti-aircraft capabilities. Their crew numbered 228 officers and enlisted men. The ships measured 119.17 meters (391 ft 0 in) overall, with a beam of 10.8 meters (35 ft 5 in) and a draft of 3.76 meters (12 ft 4 in). They displaced 2,110 metric tons (2,080 long tons) at standard load and 2,560 metric tons (2,520 long tons) at deep load. The ships had two Kampon geared steam turbines, each driving one propeller shaft, using steam provided by three Kampon water-tube boilers. The turbines were rated at a total of 52,000 shaft horsepower (39,000 kW) for a designed speed of 35 knots (65 km/h; 40 mph).

The main armament of the Yūgumo class consisted of six Type 3 127-millimeter (5.0 in) guns in three twin-gun turrets, one superfiring pair aft and one turret forward of the superstructure. The guns were able to elevate up to 75° to increase their ability against aircraft, but their slow rate of fire, slow traversing speed, and the lack of any sort of high-angle fire-control system meant that they were virtually useless as anti-aircraft guns. They were built with four Type 96 25-millimeter (1.0 in) anti-aircraft guns in two twin-gun mounts, but more of these guns were added over the course of the war. The ships were also armed with eight 610-millimeter (24.0 in) torpedo tubes in a two quadruple traversing mounts; one reload was carried for each tube. Their anti-submarine weapons comprised two depth charge throwers for which 36 depth charges were carried.

== Construction and career ==
Kishinami assisted in sinking the submarine USS Trout on 29 February 1944, with the loss of all 81 hands at the position 22°40′N 131°45′E. At the Battle of the Philippine Sea, she was assigned to the Van Force. In the Battle of Leyte Gulf the ship was assigned to the 1st Diversion Attack Force. She rescued survivors of the sinking cruiser Atago, including Vice Admiral Takeo Kurita. The destroyer suffered minor damage from near misses and strafing on 24–25 October. She ran aground on a reef on 28 October off Brunei, her top speed was reduced to 12 knots (22 km/h; 14 mph). The ship was repaired at Singapore in mid-November.

On 2 December 1944, Kishinami departed Manila, escorting Hakko Maru back to Singapore. On 4 December she was torpedoed and sunk by the submarine USS Flasher west of Palawan Island at 13°12′N 116°37′E. Ninety members of her crew were killed, including Commander Mifune; 150 survivors rescued by Yurishima and CD-17. Also among the dead was Ensign Susumu Nagumo, son of Vice Admiral Chuichi Nagumo.

On 10 January 1945, Kishinami was removed from the Navy List.
