= Design and capability of aircraft carriers during World War II =

Naval historians such as Evan Mawdsley, Richard Overy, and Craig Symonds concluded that World War II's decisive victories on land could not have been won without decisive victories at sea. Naval battles to keep shipping lanes open for combatant's movement of troops, guns, ammunition, tanks, warships, aircraft, raw materials, and food largely determined the outcome of land battles. Without the Allied victory in keeping shipping lanes open during the Battle of the Atlantic, Britain could not have fed her people or withstood Axis offensives in Europe and North Africa. Without Britain's survival and without Allied shipments of materiel, food and industrial equipment to the Soviet Union, (Note: Britain and America shipped war-sustaining goods to the Soviet Union via Arctic Ocean, Persian Gulf, and Pacific Ocean routes.) her military and economic power would likely not have rebounded in time for the Red Army to prevail at Stalingrad and Kursk.

Without victories at sea in the Pacific theater, the Allies could not have mounted amphibious assaults on or maintained land forces on Guadalcanal, New Guinea, Saipan, The Philippines, Iwo Jima, or Okinawa. Allied operations in the Atlantic and Pacific war theaters were interconnected because they frequently competed for scarce naval resources for everything from aircraft carriers to transports and landing craft. Effective transport of troops and military supplies between the two war theaters required naval protection for shipping routes around the Cape of Good Hope, through the Suez canal, and through the Panama Canal. In both theaters, maritime dominance enabled combatants to use the sea for their own purposes and deprive its use by adversaries. As naval historian Admiral Herbert Richmond stated, "Sea power did not win the war itself: it enabled the war to be won".

Aircraft carriers played a major role in winning decisive naval battles, supporting key amphibious landings, and keeping critical merchant shipping lanes open for transporting military personnel and their equipment to land battle zones.

== Design considerations ==
Aircraft carrier design involved trade-offs between offensive striking power and defensive survivability. The more carrier tonnage allocated to guns and armor for protection, the less was available for carrying and launching aircraft, the warship's principal weapon. Combatant nations of World War II placed varying emphasis on these factors depending upon conditions in their principal operating theater, their preferred operating tactics, and their industrial capability. Experts continue to debate whether increasing carrier survivability through increased anti-aircraft armament and armored flight decks was optimal during World War II since adding the weight to do so necessitated reductions in the number of carrier aircraft available to inflict damage upon the enemy. For example, would designing the USS Yorktown so that it was more likely to survive the punishment it took at the Battle of Midway have been desirable if its carrying a smaller air group resulted in fewer Japanese carriers being sunk?

== Initial constraints on design ==
Aircraft carrier design prior to the outbreak of World War II had been constrained by limitations of international agreements among the major naval powers which were intended to avoid an arms race over capital ships. The Washington Naval Treaty of 1922 limited individual carrier displacement for the five parties to 27,000 long tons, except that each could convert up to two existing battleship hulls to carriers with displacements up to 33,000 tons. Armament for carriers was limited to a maximum of ten guns with a maximum caliber of 8 inches (203 mm). Aircraft carriers were defined as having displacements of at least 10,000 tons and used exclusively for launching and landing aircraft. The total tonnage limit for carriers was 135,000 tons for UK and America, 81,000 for Japan, and 60,000 tons for Italy and France. Any carrier built could not be replaced for twenty years but carriers already built were deemed "experimental" and could be replaced at any time. Carriers under 10,000 tons were not included in the definition. .

== "Experimental" designs ==
Only four aircraft carriers were in service or under construction at the time the Washington Naval Treaty was agreed to. These four were considered "experimental" and not included as part of the treaty's overall tonnage limitations. They were relatively small in size and carried a relatively small number of aircraft. These were HMS Argus (the first full deck aircraft carrier), USS Langley (a converted collier), IJN Hōshō (the first purpose built carrier to enter service), and HMS Hermes (the first purpose designed carrier). (Note: construction of Hermes started in 1918 but her design was being modified as a result of experiments with Argus and Eagle; the last revisions made in 1921 and it was not commissioned until 1924)

== Evolving design emphasis by each combatant ==
=== Japanese aircraft carriers ===
The Imperial Japanese Navy (IJN) emphasized offensive capability consistent with their strategic vision of orchestrating and winning a single, decisive battle. Limited by treaties to having fewer capital ships than the US and UK, Japan's planning emphasized ways to degrade enemy fleets before they arrived at battle by extending the capability of IJN weapon systems. Aircraft as well as torpedoes had longer ranges than American or British counterparts.

The following table shows some key performance parameters for Japanese aircraft carriers. Carriers are listed in order of commissioning date within each carrier type (fleet, light, escort).

Characteristics of Japanese aircraft carriers (Note: Values shown here are typically for the 1942 to 1944 time frame)
		Commission date (Note: The date first commissioned as an aircraft carrier)	Class	Standard displacement (Note: the weight - in tons - of the ship with full load of stores and ammunition, but with no fuel, lubricating oil, or reserve feed water.)	Length (ft)	Speed (kn)	Range (nmi) (Note: the maximum distance in nautical miles possible on a load of fuel at optimal speed, which is typically much less than maximum speed.)	Crew	Operational aircraft (Note: the number that could be launched for attacks or combat air patrol. It excludes spares and cargo aircraft.)	Reserve aircraft	Lost to
Fleet carriers
1	Akagi	25-May-27	Akagi	36,500	855	31	8,200	1,630	66	15	1 bomb (Note: Set fires which became out of control. Scuttled the following day)
2	Kaga	30-Nov-29	Kaga	38,200	812	28	10,000	1,708	72	18	4 bombs
3	Soryu	29-Sep-37	Soryu	15,900	746	34	7,750	1,103	63	8	3 bombs
4	Hiryu	05-Jul-39	Soryu	17,300	746	34	10,330	1,103	57	16	4 bombs
5	Shokaku	08-Aug-41	Shokaku	26,675	845	34	9,700	1,660	72	12	4 torpedoes
6	Zuikaku	25-Sep-41	Shokaku	29,800	845	34	--	1,660	72	12	9 bombs+7 torp
7	Junyo	03-May-42	Hiyo	24,100	718	25.5	10,000	1,224	48	5	--
8	Hiyo	31-Jul-42	Hiyo	26,949	718	25.5	10,000	1,224	48	5	2 torpedoes
9	Taiho	07-Mar-44	Taiho	29,300	855	33	10,000	1,751	75	0	1 sub. torpedo
10	Unryu	06-Aug-44	Unryu	17,150	742	34	8,000	1,595	57	6	2 sub. torpedoes
11	Amagi	10-Aug-44	Unryu	17,460	742	34	9,700	1,595	57	6	many bombs
12	Katsuragi	15-Oct-44	Unryu	17,260	742	33	9,700	1,595	57	6	--
13	Shinano	19-Nov-44	Shinano	64,800	873	27	10,000	2,400	47	0	4 sub. Torpedoes
Light carriers
1	Hosho	27-Dec-22	Hosho	7,470	551	25	8,680	550	21	0	--
2	Ryujo	09-May-33	Ryujo	12,732	590	29	10,000	924	48	0	4 bm+1 torp
3	Zuiho	27-Dec-40	Zuiho	11,262	712	28	9,236	785	30	0	many bm +2 torp
4	Shoho	30-Nov-41	Zuiho	11,262	674	28	9,236	785	30	0	13 bm+7 torp
5	Ryuho	28-Nov-42	Ryuho	13,360	707	26	8,000	989	30	0	--
6	Chitose	01-Nov-43	Chitose	11,190	631	29	11,000	1,500	30	0	3 torpedoes
7	Chiyoda	21-Dec-43	Chitose	11,190	631	29	11,810	1,500	30	0	4 bombs + gunfire
Escort carriers
1	Taiyo	15-Sep-41	Taiyo	17,830	591	21	8,500	850	23	4	1 sub. torpedo
2	Unyo	31-May-42	Taiyo	17,830	649	21	8,500	850	30	0	1 sub. torpedo
3	Chuyo	25-Nov-42	Taiyo	17,830	591	21	8,500	850	30	0	2 sub. Torpedoes
4	Shinyo	15-Nov-43	Shinyo	17,500	651	22	8,000	948	27	6	4 sub. Torpedoes
5	Kaiyo	23-Nov-43	Kaiyo	13,600	546	23	7,000	587	24	0	bombs
	RANGES										
	Fleet										
	Low			15,900	718	26	7,750	1,103	48	0	
	High			64,800	873	34	10,000	2,400	75	18	
	Light										
	Low			7,470	551	25	8,000	550	21	0	
	High			13,360	712	29	11,810	1,500	48	0	
	Escort										
	Low			13,600	546	21	7,000	587	23	0	
	High			17,830	651	23	8,500	948	30	6	

Notes:

- This table includes only ships that operated between July 1937 and August 1945 and that had flight decks for both launching and recovering aircraft at sea.

=== American aircraft carriers ===
Americans perceived their principal operating theater would be the Pacific, where immense distances between refueling bases placed a premium on carrier speed and range. Threats were likely to come from other warships, either as enemy aircraft or ship's guns, rather than from land-based planes or batteries. Carrier-launched strikes would involve fewer aircraft and each would carry less of a payload, consisting of 250 lb and 500 lb bombs, compared to land-based aircraft. Also, war-games indicated the ability to strike first and decisively was important for success. Strong first strikes against enemy carriers were expected to reduce or eliminate their ability to counter-attack, reducing the need for strong defensive measures. As a result of these considerations, Americans placed greater emphasis on aircraft striking power than upon survivability when attacked. Accordingly, carriers were designed to carry more aircraft and aircraft components at the expense of more anti-aircraft guns and flight deck armor. To further increase the number of aircraft carried, large numbers of them were kept on the flight deck in addition to those kept below in hangars. In the Pacific, storms that could toss or wash deck-park aircraft overboard were uncommon and could theoretically be navigated around. Finally, within a year of the beginning of the Pacific War, America's industrial capacity enabled them to rapidly make good their carrier losses, enabling them to take greater risks with their carriers to achieve greater success.

=== British aircraft carriers ===
The British also operated in the Pacific but, for most of the war, their principal areas of carrier operation were the coastal Atlantic, Mediterranean, and North Sea. In these areas, there were no enemy carriers. The threat was from land-based, potentially multi-engine, heavy bombers in potentially overwhelming numbers that could deliver heavy payloads consisting of 1,000 lb bombs or more and be protected by equally large numbers of fighter aircraft. Unlike with relatively few and small enemy attacking aircraft in the Pacific, it was almost assured that some attacking aircraft would penetrate a fighter and anti-aircraft screen. Further, attacks from land bases could be sustained after airfield repairs, unlike in the Pacific where the launch platform could be sunk or sufficiently damaged to require an immediate return to dry-dock facilities. Accordingly, emphasis was placed on surviving an attack such that a counter-attack could be launched. Survivability was enhanced with more anti-aircraft guns and flight deck armor at the expense of larger aircraft groups on board. Additional anti-aircraft armament also made carriers more self-sufficient for defense and less reliant upon other warships for screening. Finally, heavy weather was more common and less avoidable in the Atlantic theater than in the Pacific. and deck-parking to increase aircraft group size was less common.

=== All carriers ===
The table below shows the specifications and capabilities for aircraft carriers of all combatants as they evolved over time. During the war, warships received modifications and upgrades, including increasing anti-aircraft guns. There were other aircraft carrier designs built during the war which only entered service just prior to or after the end of hostilities such as the British Light Fleet Carrier, or the US Midway-class. There were also cancelled carriers such as the French Joffre-class, British Malta-class, the German "Aircraft carrier II" or Jade-class.

Carrier	Date commissioned	Carrier class	Country	Standard displacement (t)	Full displacement (t)	Length w/l (ft)	Length o/a (ft)	Beam o/a (ft)	Draft (ft)	Speed (kn)	Range (nmi)	H. AA	L. AA	Belt Arm.	Deck Arm.	Aircraft	Crew
HMS Argus	1918		UK	14,680	16,028		565	68	23	20	3,600	6				15-18	495
USS Langley	1922	Langley	US	12,900	14,100		542	65	25	16	3,500	4				36	631
IJN Hōshō CVL	1922		Japan	7,590	9,646		552	59	20	25	8,680	6				15	512
HMS Hermes CVL	1923		UK	11,020	13,900		600	70	23	25	5,600	9		3	1	20	566
HMS Eagle	1924	converted battleship	UK	22,200			668	115	27	24	4,800	14		4.5	1-1.5	25-30	791
HMS Furious	1925	modified Courageous	UK	22,900	26,000		787	88	25	30	7,480	16		2-3	.8-3	36	795
IJN Akagi	1927		Japan	37,100	42,000		855	103	29	32	10,000	12	14	6	3.1	66	1,630
USS Saratoga	1927	Lexington	US	37,000	43,746		888	106	30	33	10,000	20		5-7	.8-2	78	2,791
USS Lexington	1927	Lexington	US	37,000	48,500		888	108	33	33	10,000	20		5-7	.8-2	78	2,791
Béarn	1927		France	22,501	29,000		599	116	31	22	7,000	14	16	3.1	1	35-40	865
HMS Courageous	1928	Courageous	UK	24,600	27,420	735	786	91	28	30	6,630	16		2-3	.8-3	48	1,217
IJN Kaga	1929		Japan	38,813			812	33	31	28	10,000	26	22	6	1.5	90	1,708
HMS Glorious	1930	Courageous-class	UK	25,370	27,859	735	787	91	28	30	5,860	16		2-3	.8-1	48	1,283
IJN Ryujo CVL	1933		Japan	7,900	9,990		590	67	18	29	10,000	12	24			48	600
USS Ranger	1934		US	14,810	17,859	730	769	109	22	29	10,000	8	40	2	1*	86	2,461
IJN Sōryū	1937		Japan	16,200	19,100		748	70	25	34	7,750	6	14			63+9	1,100
USS Yorktown	1937	Yorktown	US	20,100	25,900		825	109	26	33	12,500	8	40	2.5-4		80-90	2,217
USS Enterprise	1938	Yorktown	US	19,800	25,500	770	825	110	26	33	12,500	8	40	2.5-4		90	2,217
HMS Ark Royal	1938		UK	22,000	28,160	722	800	95	28	30	7,600	16	64	4.5	.8-3.5	50-60	1,580
IJN Hiryū	1939		Japan	17,600	29,570		746	73	26	34	10,330	12	21	3.5-6	1-2.2	64+9	1,100
USS Wasp	1940	Wasp	US	14,900	19,423	688	741	109	20	30	12,000	8	30	3.5		100	2,167
HMS Illustrious	1940	Illustrious	UK	23,369		710	740	96	29	30	10,700	16	48	4.5	3.0	36-57	1,299
HMS Formidable	1940	Illustrious	UK	23,369		710	740	96	29	30	10,700	16	48	4.5	3.0	36-57	1,299
IJN Shōkaku	1941	Shōkaku	Japan	26,087	32,620		845	85		34	9,700	16	32			72	1,660
USS Essex	1942	Essex	US	27,500	36,960		872	148		33	20,000	12	78	3-4	1.5	95	2,600
HMS Implacable	1944	Implacable	UK	32,630		767	96		33	6,720	16	104	4.5	3.0	48-81	2,300	

SELECTED ESCORT CARRIERS

Long Island aircraft: 16 hangar + 46 flight deck Audacity: no hangar; aircraft stored on flight deck

Carrier Name	Date Comm.	Carrier Class	Std. Displ	Full Displ	Length f/d	Length o/a	Beam o/a	Draft	Speed (kn)	Range (nmi)	H. AA	L. AA	Belt Arm.	Deck Arm.	Air- craft	Men
USS Long Island	June 1941	Long Island			404	492	70	25	17	10,000					62	856
HMS Audacity	June 1941	converted cargo liner	12,000		450	467	56	28	15		1	9			6+8	480
IJN Taiyō	Sep 1941	Taiyō	18,116	20,321		591	73	25	21	8,500	8	14			27-30	850
IJN Un'yō	May 1942	Taiyō	18,116	20,321		591	73	25	21		8	8			30	850
USS Sangamon	August 1942	Sangamon	11,600	24,665		553	114	32	18		2	20			25	830
USS Bogue	September 1942	Bogue (Note: Attacker-class in British service)	9,800			496	112	26	18		2				24	890
IJN Chūyō	November 1942	Taiyō	18,116			591	73	25	21	8,500	8	8			30	850
USS Casablanca	Jul 1943	Casablanca	7,900	11,077	490 w/l	498	65-108	22	19	10,240	1	20			27	916
HMS Pretoria Castle	July 1943 (Note: used for trials and training only)	converted liner	23,450			594	76	29	18						21	
IJN Shin'yō	November 1943	converted liner	17,500	20,586		621	26	26	22		8	30			27+6	942
IJN Kaiyō	November 1943		13,600	16,483		546	71	26	23	7,000	8	24			24	829
HMS Vindex	December 1943	Nairana	13,671			524	68	21	17		2	32			15-20	700
HMS Nairana	Dec 1943	Nairana	14,280			529	69	21	17		2	32			15-20	728
USS Commencement Bay	Nov 1944	Commencement Bay	11,100			557	75	31			2	36			34	1,066
