= Japanese ship Un'yō =

Two Japanese Naval vessels have been named Un'yō:

- Japanese gunboat Un'yō (雲揚, Rising Cloud), a gunboat active during the Boshin War
- Japanese aircraft carrier Un'yō (雲鷹, Cloud Hawk), a Taiyō-class escort carrier of the Imperial Japanese Navy during World War II
