= John P. Cromwell =

American naval submarine officer and WWII Medal of Honor recipient

John Philip Cromwell
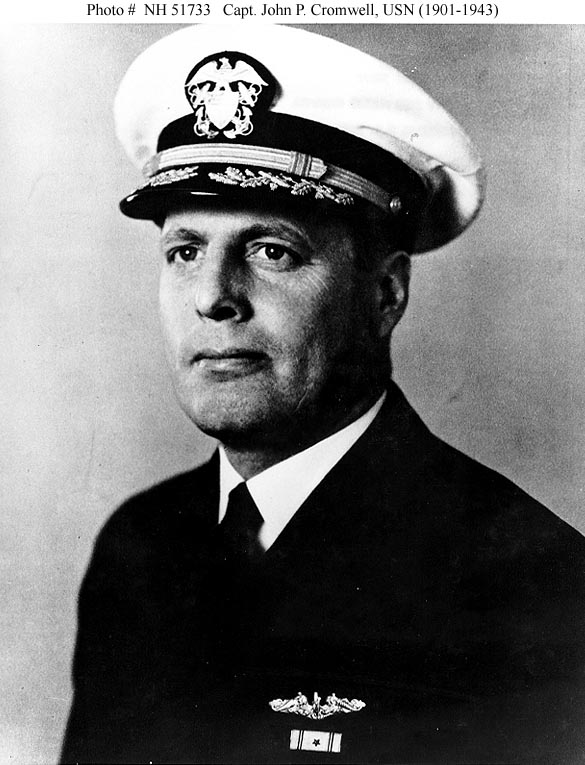
- Captain John P. Cromwell, USN
- Born: September 11, 1901; Henry, Illinois, U.S.
- Died: November 19, 1943 (aged 42) at sea aboard the USS Sculpin (SS-191)
- Burial place: at sea aboard the USS Sculpin (SS-191)
- Military career
- Allegiance: United States of America
- Branch: United States Navy
- Service years: 1924-1943
- Rank: Captain
- Commands: USS S-20 (SS-125); Submarine Division 203; Submarine Division 44; Submarine Division 43
- Conflicts: World War II
- Awards: Medal of Honor; Legion of Merit; Purple Heart

Captain John Philip Cromwell (September 11, 1901 – November 19, 1943) was the most senior submariner awarded the Medal of Honor in World War II and one of the three submarine officers who received it posthumously. In some ways similar to his fellow honoree, Howard Gilmore, Cromwell consciously chose to sacrifice his own life to safeguard the lives of others, in a combat action which took place in November 1943.

== Early life and career ==
Cromwell was born in Henry, Illinois, on September 11, 1901. Appointed to the U.S. Naval Academy in 1920, he graduated in June 1924 and served initially in the battleship USS Maryland school and was assigned to USS S-24 (SS-129) during 1927–29. He next had three year's diesel engineering instruction, followed by further tours of duty in submarines.

Lieutenant Cromwell commanded USS S-20 (SS-125) in 1936–37, then served on the staff of Commander Submarine Division 4. He was promoted to the rank of lieutenant commander in 1939 and spent two years in Washington, D.C., with the Bureau of Engineering and Bureau of Ships. In May 1941, he became engineer officer for the Pacific Fleet submarine force.

== World War II ==
During 1942–43, Cromwell commanded Submarine Divisions 203, 44 and 43, flying his pennant in USS Sculpin (SS-191).

Following promotion to captain, he went to sea in Sculpin as prospective commander of a mid-Pacific submarine wolf pack. Sculpin was commanded by LCDR Fred Connaway, making his first war patrol. If conditions warranted, Cromwell would form a wolfpack with USS Searaven (SS-196) and either USS Spearfish (SS-190) or USS Apogon (SS-308) under his direction. As a senior officer, Cromwell was completely familiar with the plans for the upcoming Battle of Tarawa, Operation Galvanic, and knew a lot more about ULTRA – and its source – than anyone else on Sculpin. It was Cromwell's first war patrol also.

While attacking a Japanese convoy on November 19, 1943, Sculpin was forced to the surface, fatally damaged in a gun battle and abandoned by her surviving crew members. Captain Cromwell, who knew secret details of the impending operation to capture the Gilbert Islands, deliberately remained on board as she sank. For his sacrificial heroism in preventing the enemy from obtaining this information, he posthumously received the Medal of Honor.

== Medal of Honor action ==
After a brief overhaul, Sculpin left Pearl Harbor for her ninth war patrol on November 5, 1943. After refueling at Johnston Island on November 7, she departed for her assigned station northeast of Truk. On November 29, COMSUBPAC radioed Sculpin to order CAPT Cromwell to activate the wolfpack. When Sculpin failed to acknowledge the message, even after several repetitions, she was assumed – correctly – to have been lost at sea. It wasn't until after the war that the details of her loss – and that of John Cromwell – to enemy action became known from both Japanese sources and surviving crewmembers who had been prisoners of war.

Sculpin had actually arrived on station on November 16 and made radar contact with a large, high-speed convoy on the night of the 18th. After making a fast surface run to get ahead of the quarry, LCDR Connaway submerged for an attack at dawn. As he started his final approach, however, his periscope was spotted by the enemy, and Connaway was forced to take Sculpin deep and allow the convoy to pass overhead. Then, he surfaced again to attempt another end run in broad daylight. Unfortunately, the Japanese destroyer Yamagumo had lagged behind the convoy specifically to counter such a move and, after forcing Connaway to make a quick dive, dropped a pattern of depth charges that – unbeknownst to the crew – damaged the depth gauge. Sculpin went deep and laid low for several hours.

Around noon, Connaway attempted to bring Sculpin back to periscope depth, seeking another opportunity to attack. However, while coming up, the broken depth gauge stuck at 125 feet, confusing the diving officer, and causing the boat to broach the surface in full view of Yamagumo, which was still patrolling the area. As Sculpin crash-dived again, the Japanese destroyer dropped a string of 18 depth charges, severely damaging the boat and causing temporary loss of depth control. Numerous leaks developed in the hull, and so much water came on board that the submarine was forced to run at high speed to maintain depth. This invited a second Japanese attack that did even more damage.

At this point, Connaway concluded that the only chance of saving his crew was to come to the surface and fight it out there. Sculpin surfaced, and with decks awash, her crew manned the deck guns. The result of this uneven contest was hardly in doubt. Yamagumo's first salvo hit Sculpin's conning tower, killing the entire bridge watch team, including Connaway and his executive and gunnery officers. The gun crew died almost instantly from shrapnel. The senior ship's officer surviving, a reserve lieutenant, ordered the boat scuttled and the crew to abandon ship.

This action left CAPT Cromwell facing a fateful choice. With his personal knowledge of both ULTRA and GALVANIC, he realized immediately that to abandon ship and become a prisoner of the Japanese would create a serious danger of compromising these vital secrets to the enemy under the influence of drugs or torture. For this reason, he refused to leave the stricken submarine and gave his life to avoid capture. He and 11 others went down with Sculpin as she sank.

== After action summary ==
Forty-two members of Sculpin's crew – three officers and 39 enlisted men – were pulled from the sea by the Japanese, though one of the latter, badly wounded, was thrown back. The 41 survivors were taken to Truk and interrogated for ten days by Japanese intelligence officers. The group was divided in half for transport back to Japan on two escort carriers – 21 on Chuyo and 20 on Un'yō. Those on Unyo arrived in Japan in early December and spent the rest of the war working in the Ashio copper mines, after which they were repatriated to tell their story.

On the evening of December 3, 1943, 240 miles (390 km) southeast of Yokosuka – with some help from ULTRA – USS Sailfish (SS-192) sank Chuyo, and only one of the Sculpin prisoners on board survived.

When the story of John Cromwell's heroic sacrifice was revealed in the accounts of the Sculpin survivors, COMSUBPAC VADM Charles Lockwood nominated him for the Medal of Honor. The award was approved and presented posthumously to Cromwell's widow after the war.

== Awards and honors ==

Submarine Warfare insignia
Medal of Honor
Legion of Merit	Purple Heart	American Defense Service Medal w/ Fleet Clasp (3/16" Bronze Star)
American Campaign Medal	Asiatic-Pacific Campaign Medal w/ 3/16" Bronze Star	World War II Victory Medal

=== Medal of Honor citation ===
Rank and organization: Captain, U.S. Navy. Born: September 11, 1901, Henry, Ill. Appointed from: Illinois. Other Navy award: Legion of Merit.

Citation

For conspicuous gallantry and intrepidity at the risk of his life above and beyond the call of duty as Commander of a Submarine Coordinated Attack Group with Flag in the U.S.S. Sculpin, during the Ninth War Patrol of that vessel in enemy-controlled waters off Truk Island, November 19, 1943. Undertaking this patrol prior to the launching of our first large-scale offensive in the Pacific, Captain Cromwell, alone of the entire Task Group, possessed secret intelligence information of our submarine strategy and tactics, scheduled Fleet movements and specific attack plans. Constantly vigilant and precise in carrying out his secret orders, he moved his underseas flotilla inexorably forward despite savage opposition and established a line of submarines to southeastward of the main Japanese stronghold at Truk. Cool and undaunted as the submarine, rocked and battered by Japanese depth-charges, sustained terrific battle damage and sank to an excessive depth, he authorized the Sculpin to surface and engage the enemy in a gun-fight, thereby providing an opportunity for the crew to abandon ship. Determined to sacrifice himself rather than risk capture and subsequent danger of revealing plans under Japanese torture or use of drugs, he stoically remained aboard the mortally wounded vessel as she plunged to her death. Preserving the security of his mission at the cost of his own life, he had served his country as he had served the Navy, with deep integrity and an uncompromising devotion to duty. His great moral courage in the face of certain death adds new luster to the traditions of the United States Naval Service. He gallantly gave his life for his country.

=== Other honors ===
In 1954, the destroyer escort USS Cromwell (DE-1014) was named in his honor.

Cromwell Hall, the Navy's Submarine Learning Center at the submarine base in Groton, Connecticut, was also named for him.

== See also ==
- List of Medal of Honor recipients for World War II
