= USS S-20 =

S-class submarine of the United States

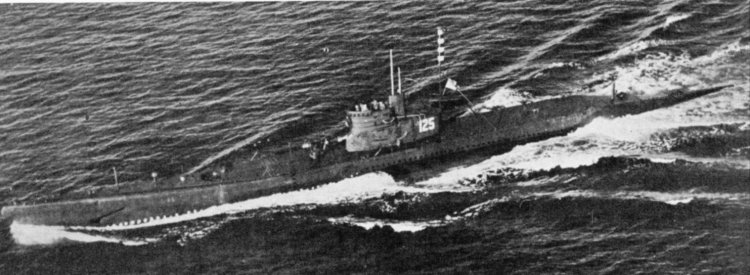
- USS S-20 (SS-125) S-20 and her snorkel are pictured here, off New England, on 26 March 1945

History

United States
- Name: S-20
- Builder: Fore River Shipyard, Quincy, Massachusetts
- Cost: $677,622.76 (hull and machinery)
- Laid down: 15 August 1918
- Launched: 9 June 1920
- Sponsored by: Miss Anne Claggett Zell
- Commissioned: 22 November 1922
- Decommissioned: 16 July 1945
- Stricken: 25 July 1945
- Identification: Hull symbol: SS-124; Call sign: NINJ
- Fate: Sold for scrapping, 22 January 1946

General characteristics
- Class & type: S-18-class submarine
- Displacement: 930 long tons (945 t) surfaced; 1,094 long tons (1,112 t) submerged
- Length: 219 feet 3 inches (66.83 m)
- Beam: 20 ft 8 in (6.30 m)
- Draft: 17 ft 3 in (5.26 m)
- Installed power: 1,200 brake horsepower (895 kW) diesel; 2,375 hp (1,771 kW) electric
- Propulsion: 2 × NELSECO diesel engines; 2 × Ridgway Dynamo & Engine Company electric motors; 2 × 60-cell batteries; 2 × Propellers
- Speed: 14.5 knots (26.9 km/h; 16.7 mph) surfaced; 11 kn (20 km/h; 13 mph) submerged
- Range: 3,420 nmi (6,330 km; 3,940 mi) at 6.5 kn (12.0 km/h; 7.5 mph) surfaced; 8,950 nmi (16,580 km; 10,300 mi) at 9.5 kn (17.6 km/h; 10.9 mph) surfaced with fuel in main ballast tanks; 20 hours at 5 knots (9 km/h; 6 mph) submerged
- Test depth: 200 ft (61 m)
- Capacity: 41,921 US gallons (158,690 L; 34,907 imp gal) fuel oil
- Complement: 4 officers; 34 enlisted
- Armament: 4 × 21-inch (533 mm) torpedo tubes (12 torpedoes); 1 × 4-inch (102 mm)/50-caliber

USS S-20 (SS-125) was an S-18-class submarine, also referred to as an S-1-class or "Holland"-type, of the United States Navy, in commission from 1924 to 1945.

She served as an engineering experimental ship, starting in 1931, though she was modified in 1924, with a raised bow and external blisters to carry more fuel oil.

She saw duty in both the Atlantic and Pacific Oceans, and during World War II operated off New England.

== Design ==
The S-18-class had a length of 219 feet 3 inches (66.8 m) overall, a beam of 20 ft 8 in (6.3 m), and a mean draft of 17 ft 3 in (5.3 m). They displaced 930 long tons (940 t) on the surface and 1,094 long tons (1,112 t) submerged. All S-class submarines had a crew of 4 officers and 34 enlisted men, when first commissioned. They had a diving depth of 200 ft (61.0 m).

For surface running, the S-18-class were powered by two 600-brake-horsepower (447 kW) NELSECO diesel engines, each driving one propeller shaft. When submerged each propeller was driven by a 1,175-horsepower (876 kW) Ridgway Dynamo & Engine Company electric motor. They could reach 14.5 knots (26.9 km/h; 16.7 mph) on the surface and 11 kn (20 km/h; 13 mph) underwater.

The boats were armed with four 21-inch (533 mm) torpedo tubes in the bow. They carried eight reloads, for a total of twelve torpedoes. The S-18-class submarines were also armed with a single 4 in (100 mm)/50 caliber deck gun.

=== Modifications ===
S-20 was rebuilt in 1924, with a larger bow similar to that of the V-1 class to improve seakeeping and blisters on the upper hull to hold more fuel, but this modification was not repeated on any other members of her class.

S-20 was also used as an experimental engine test vessel, with a new high-speed geared-drive 600 hp MAN diesel engine replacing her starboard engine in 1931. In 1932, this new engine was replaced by a prototype diesel-electric plant. This was a MAN-type 635-horsepower (474 kW) 16-cylinder engine running at even higher speed, driving an electrical generator built by the Electric Boat Company and designated 16VM1. Electricity produced by the generator was used to drive a high-speed electric motor geared to the shaft; there was no direct connection between the diesel engine and the shaft. Diesel-electric propulsion was then adopted for many US submarines through World War II, starting with the 1932 Porpoise class; other navies did not follow suit until after World War II.

== Construction ==
S-20's keel was laid down on 15 August 1918. by the Bethlehem Shipbuilding Corporation's Fore River Shipyard, in Quincy, Massachusetts. She was launched on 9 June 1920, sponsored by Miss Anne Claggett Zell, and commissioned on 22 November 1922.

== Service history ==
=== 1922–1940 ===
In addition to duty along the northeastern coast of the United States, while based at New London, Connecticut, from 1922 to 1929, S-20 visited Coco Solo, in the Panama Canal Zone, in March 1923; served at Saint Thomas, US Virgin Islands, in February 1924; and operated in the Panama Canal area, from January through April 1926. S-20 visited Kingston, Jamaica, from 20 to 28 March 1927, and served again in the Panama Canal area, from 17 April 1929 to November 1930.

Departing Coco Solo, on 7 November 1930, S-20 arrived at Pearl Harbor, in the Territory of Hawaii, on 7 December 1930. Following duty there, she departed on 20 February 1932, and from March 1932 to April 1933, served at the Mare Island Navy Yard, California. Later, she operated mainly at San Diego, California, into 1934.

Departing San Diego on 15 March 1934, S-20 returned to New London, on 28 October 1934. From then until December 1941, she operated there as part of a test and evaluation division. During this period, she visited Guantanamo, Cuba, from February to March 1938; served in the Panama Canal area, from January to March 1939; and visited Guantanamo, again in February 1940.

Her commanding officer from 1936 to 1937, was Lieutenant, later Captain), John P. Cromwell, a future posthumous Medal of Honor recipient for his actions aboard USS Sculpin (SS-191), in 1943. From 1941 to 1942, her commander was another future Medal of Honor recipient, Lieutenant, later Commander, Samuel David Dealey.

=== 1941–1945 ===
From December 1941 to July 1945, S-20 continued to operate from New London. Her operations were off New England and often included training activities at Casco Bay, Maine.

== Fate ==
Departing New London, on 2 July 1945, S-20 was decommissioned on 16 July, at the Philadelphia Navy Yard. Her name was struck from the Naval Vessel Register on 25 July. She was sold on 22 January 1946, to North American Smelting Company, Philadelphia for scrapping.

== Awards ==
- American Defense Service Medal
- American Campaign Medal
- World War II Victory Medal

== Bibliography ==
- "Table 21 - Ships on Navy List June 30, 1919". Congressional Serial Set. U.S. Government Printing Office: 770. 1921.
- Friedman, Norman (1995). U.S. Submarines Through 1945: An Illustrated Design History. Annapolis, Maryland: Naval Institute Press. ISBN 1-55750-263-3.
- Mohl, Michael. "S-20 (SS-125)". Navsource.net.
- Hall, Anne Martin (1925). Ships of the United States navy and their sponsors, 1913-1923.
- "S-20 (SS-125)". Dictionary of American Naval Fighting Ships. Navy Department, Naval History and Heritage Command. 1 September 2015. This article incorporates text from this source, which is in the public domain.
