= Nitta Maru-class cargo liner =

Class of Japanese ocean liners

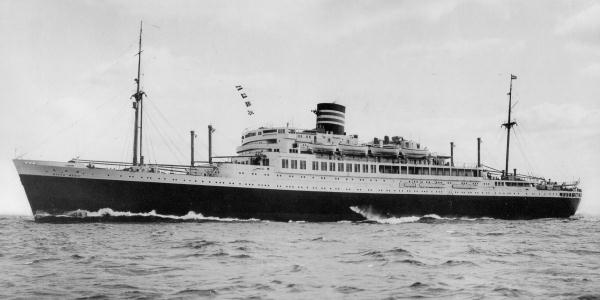
- Nitta Maru in passenger service, 1940

Class overview
- Name: Nitta Maru class ocean liners
- Builders: Mitsubishi's Nagasaki shipyard
- Operators: Nippon Yūsen (NYK Line); Osaka Shosen Kaisha (OSK line); (Empire of Japan) Imperial Japanese Navy (IJN)
- Preceded by: Kashiwara Maru class (Hiyō class)
- Built: 1938 – 1941
- In service: 1939 – 1944
- In commission: 1939 – 1941 (as liners)
- Planned: 3
- Building: 3
- Completed: 3
- Active: 3
- Lost: 3

General characteristics
- Type: Ocean liner
- Tonnage: 17,163 GRT
- Length: 170 m (557 ft 9 in) overall
- Beam: 22.5 m (73 ft 10 in)
- Draught: 12.4 m (40 ft 8 in)
- Propulsion: 25,200 shaft horsepower (18,800 kW) using 1 propeller shaft & 4 water-tube boilers
- Speed: 19 knots (22 mph; 35 km/h)
- Capacity: 285 passengers (127 first class, 88 second, and 70 third)
- Crew: 130

The Nitta Maru-class ocean liner (新田丸級貨客船, Nitta Maru-kyū Kakyakusen) was a class of ocean liners of Japan, serving briefly during the late 1930s up to the beginning of World War II, being converted as the Taiyō-class escort carriers of the Imperial Japanese Navy.

== Background and description ==
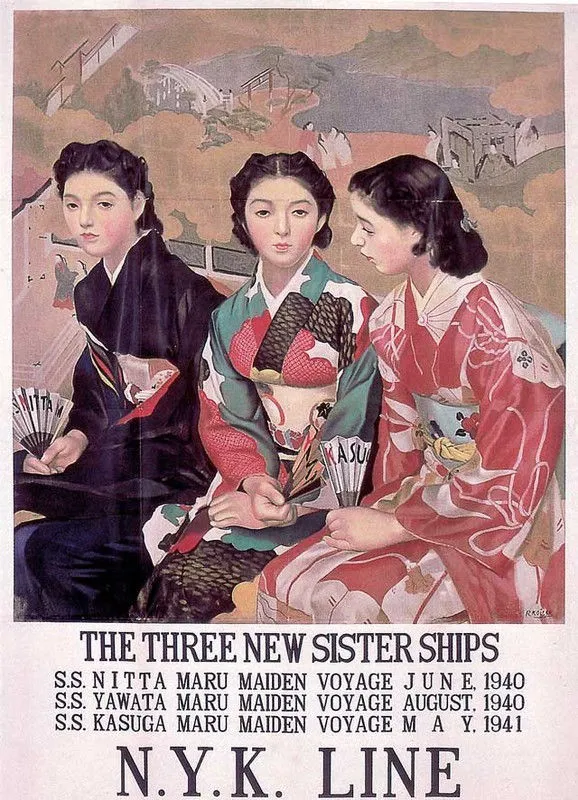
Promotional poster of the NYK Nitta Maru Sisters

The class was designed from the start to be converted, featuring military-grade hull and facilities. These ships were built by Mitsubishi at their Nagasaki shipyard for the shipping lines Nippon Yusen Kaisha (NYK) and Osaka Shosen Kaisha (OSK). Their names where chosen to match the "NYK" abbreviation (Nitta Maru, Yawata Maru, Kasuga Maru). Nitta Maru and Yawata Maru were ordered for NYK and both were completed before the beginning of the Pacific War in December 1941. The ships were intended for service to Europe, but the start of World War II in September 1939 restricted them to the Pacific. Kasuga Maru had been ordered by OSK and was fitting out when she was acquired by the IJN in 1940 and towed to Sasebo Naval Arsenal on 1 May 1941 to finish her conversion into an escort carrier. (Note: Sources are contradictory regarding when the conversion occurred and if the ship was completed before the conversion began. Stille and Watts & Gordon say the conversion began while the ship was under construction. This is indirectly supported by the allocation of a new yard number, 888, to the ship. Tully, on the other hand, says that she was requisitioned on 10 February 1941 and was used as a transport until the conversion began on 1 May.) She was the first ship to be completed as her sister ships were not converted until 1942.

The Nitta Maru-class ships were 17,163-gross register ton (GRT) cargo liners that had a length of 170 metres (557 ft 9 in), a beam of 22.5 metres (73 ft 10 in) and a depth of hold of 12.4 metres (40 ft 8 in). They had a net tonnage of 9,397 and a cargo capacity of 11,800 tons. They had accommodations for 285 passengers (127 first class, 88 second and 70 third). The ships were powered by two sets of geared steam turbines made by the shipbuilder, each driving one propeller shaft, using steam produced by four water-tube boilers. The turbines were rated at a total of 25,200 shaft horsepower (18,800 kW) that gave them an average speed of 19 knots (35 km/h; 22 mph) and a maximum speed of 22.2 knots (41.1 km/h; 25.5 mph). (Note: Watts and Gordon and Stille say that the ships were originally equipped with diesel engines that were replaced during the conversion by steam turbines, but this is contradicted by The Times and Lloyd's Register. This also seems unlikely as the conversion only took about five months when the conversion of the diesel-powered liner Argentina Maru (Kaiyō) took eleven months. In addition, the turbines in the latter were twice as powerful as those in the Taiyō-class ships and would probably have been used if the IJN wanted to increase the speed of the Taiyōs.)

== Escort carrier conversion ==
The conversion of the Taiyō-class ships, as the former liners were now known, was fairly austere and they were flush-decked escort carriers that displaced 18,120 tonnes (17,830 long tons) at standard load and 20,321 tonnes (20,000 long tons) at normal load. The ships had an overall length of 180.2 metres (591 ft 4 in), a beam of 22.5 metres (73 ft 10 in) and a draught of 7.7–8 metres (25 ft 3 in – 26 ft 3 in). As carriers they had a speed of 21 knots (39 km/h; 24 mph). The uptakes for the boilers were trunked together into a downward-curving funnel on the starboard side of the hull amidships. The ships carried 2,290 tonnes (2,250 long tons) of fuel oil that gave them a range of 6,500 nautical miles (12,000 km; 7,500 mi) at a speed of 18 knots (33 km/h; 21 mph). (Note: Other sources give a range of 8,500 nmi (15,700 km; 9,800 mi) at that speed.) Taiyō's crew numbered 747 officers and ratings while her sisters had 850 officers and crewmen.

The flight deck was 172 metres (564 ft 3 in) long and 23.5 metres (77 ft) wide. The ships had a single hangar, approximately 91.4 metres (300 ft) long, served by two centreline aircraft lifts, each 12 by 13 metres (39.4 ft × 42.7 ft). Taiyō could accommodate a total of 27 aircraft, including four spares, and her sisters had a capacity of 30 aircraft. Although larger, faster and having a larger aircraft-carrying capacity than their western counterparts, these ships were unsuited to a traditional carrier role as they lacked arresting gear.

== Ships ==
Construction data
Original name	Kanji	Conversion name	Laid down	Launched	Commissioned (as carrier)	Fate
Nitta Maru	新田丸	Chūyō	9 May 1938	20 May 1939	25 November 1942	Sunk by USS Sailfish, 4 December 1943
Yawata Maru	八幡丸	Un'yō	14 December 1938	31 October 1939	31 May 1942	Sunk by USS Barb, 17 September 1944
Kasuga Maru	春日丸	Taiyō	6 January 1940	19 September 1940	2 September 1941	Sunk by USS Rasher, 18 August 1944

== Photos ==
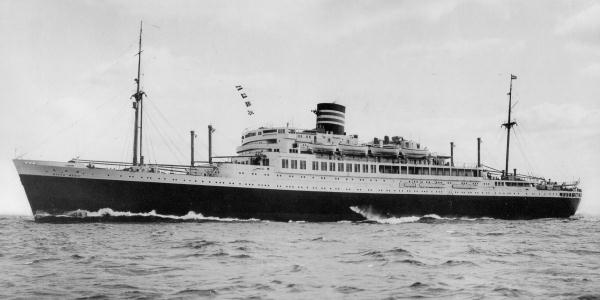
Nitta Maru

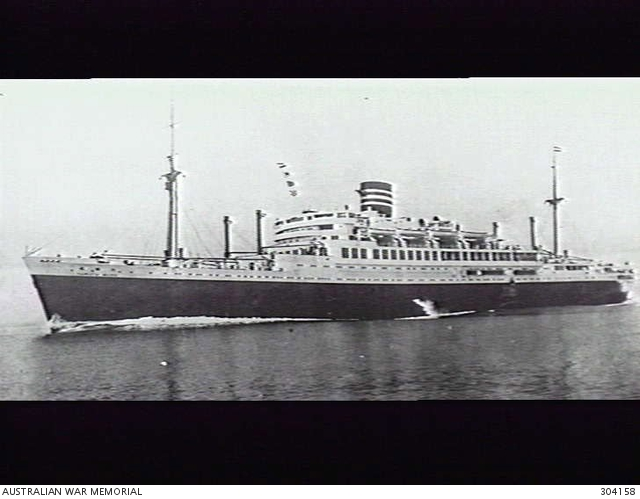
Yawata Maru

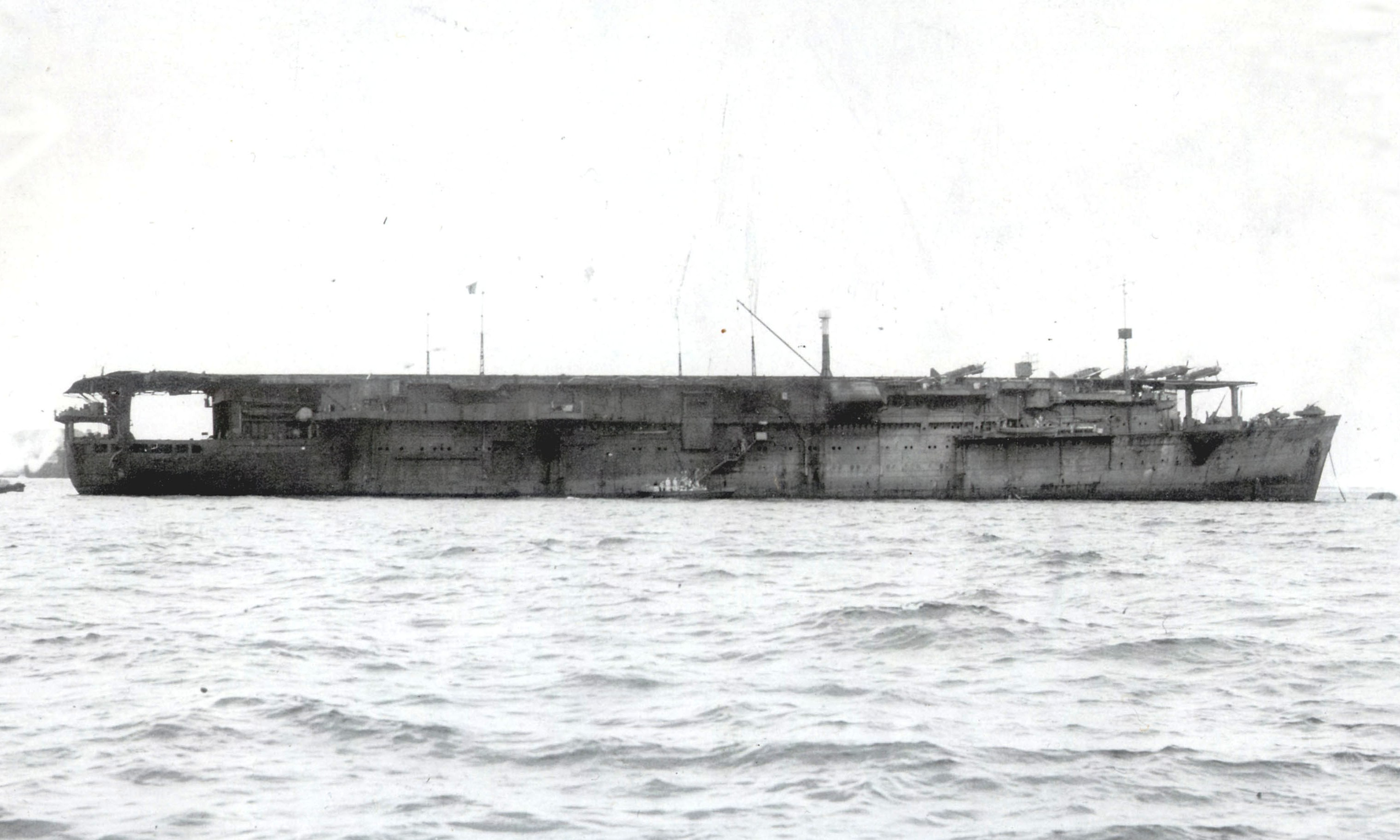
Taiyō (Kasuga Maru) as a carrier

== See also ==
- Taiyō-class escort carrier
- Japanese aircraft carrier Kaiyō (Argentina Maru ocean liner)
- Hiyō-class aircraft carrier (Kashiwara Maru-class passenger liners)
