= USS Cromwell =

Dealey-class destroyer escort

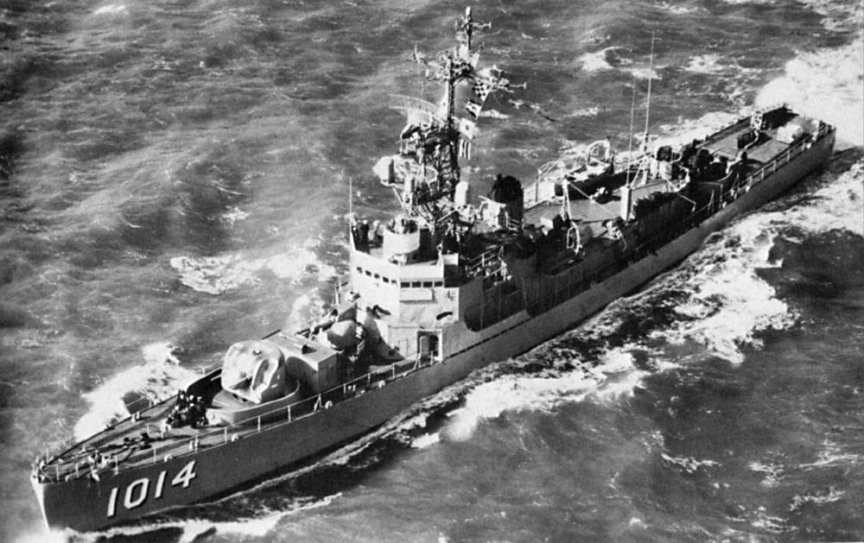
- USS Cromwell (DE-1014)

History

United States
- Name: USS Cromwell
- Namesake: John P. Cromwell
- Builder: Bath Iron Works
- Laid down: 3 August 1953
- Launched: 4 June 1954
- Commissioned: 24 November 1954
- Stricken: 5 July 1972
- Home port: Naval Station Newport, RI
- Fate: Sold for scrap, 15 June 1973

General characteristics
- Class & type: Dealey-class destroyer escort
- Displacement: 1,877 long tons (1,907 t) full load
- Length: 314 ft 6 in (95.86 m)
- Beam: 36 ft 9 in (11.20 m)
- Draft: 18 ft (5.5 m)
- Propulsion: 2 × Foster-Wheeler boilers; 1 × De Laval geared turbine; 20,000 shp (15 MW); 1 shaft
- Speed: 27 knots (31 mph; 50 km/h)
- Range: 6,000 nmi (11,000 km) at 12 kn (14 mph; 22 km/h)
- Complement: 170
- Armament: 4 × 3-inch/50-caliber guns; 1 × Squid ASW mortar; 6 × 324 mm (12.8 in) Mark 32 torpedo tubes; Mark 46 torpedoes

USS Cromwell (DE-1014), a Dealey-class destroyer escort, was a ship of the United States Navy named for Captain John P. Cromwell (1901–1943), who was awarded the Medal of Honor posthumously for his sacrificial heroism while commanding a wolf pack from the submarine Sculpin.

Cromwell was launched 4 June 1954 by Bath Iron Works Corp., Bath, Maine; sponsored by Miss A. Cromwell; and commissioned 24 November 1954.

From her home port at Naval Station Newport, Rhode Island, Cromwell joined in antisubmarine exercises in waters from Iceland to the Virgin Islands, took part in fleet exercises in the Caribbean, and served as schoolship for the Fleet Sonar School at Key West. In September and October 1957, she joined in NATO exercises which took her to ports in England and France, and between May and October 1958, had her first tour of duty in the Mediterranean. During that eventful summer, she joined in patrolling the eastern Mediterranean during the Lebanon Crisis.

Between February and April 1959, Cromwell sailed on a cruise which took her through the Panama Canal to a number of ports on the west coast of South America, and exercises with ships of the Peruvian Navy. In August, September, and October 1959, she crossed the Atlantic once more for NATO operations, and during the first half of 1960 concentrated on amphibious exercises with Marines along the North Carolina coast. Cromwell took part in NATO exercises in the fall of 1960, then returned to East Coast operations for the remainder of the year.

[1961–1972]

Cromwell was stricken from the Naval Vessel Register 5 July 1972. She was scheduled to be transferred to New Zealand, but that fell through, and she was sold for scrapping 15 June 1973.
