= Japanese aircraft carrier Chūyō =

Taiyō-class escort carrier

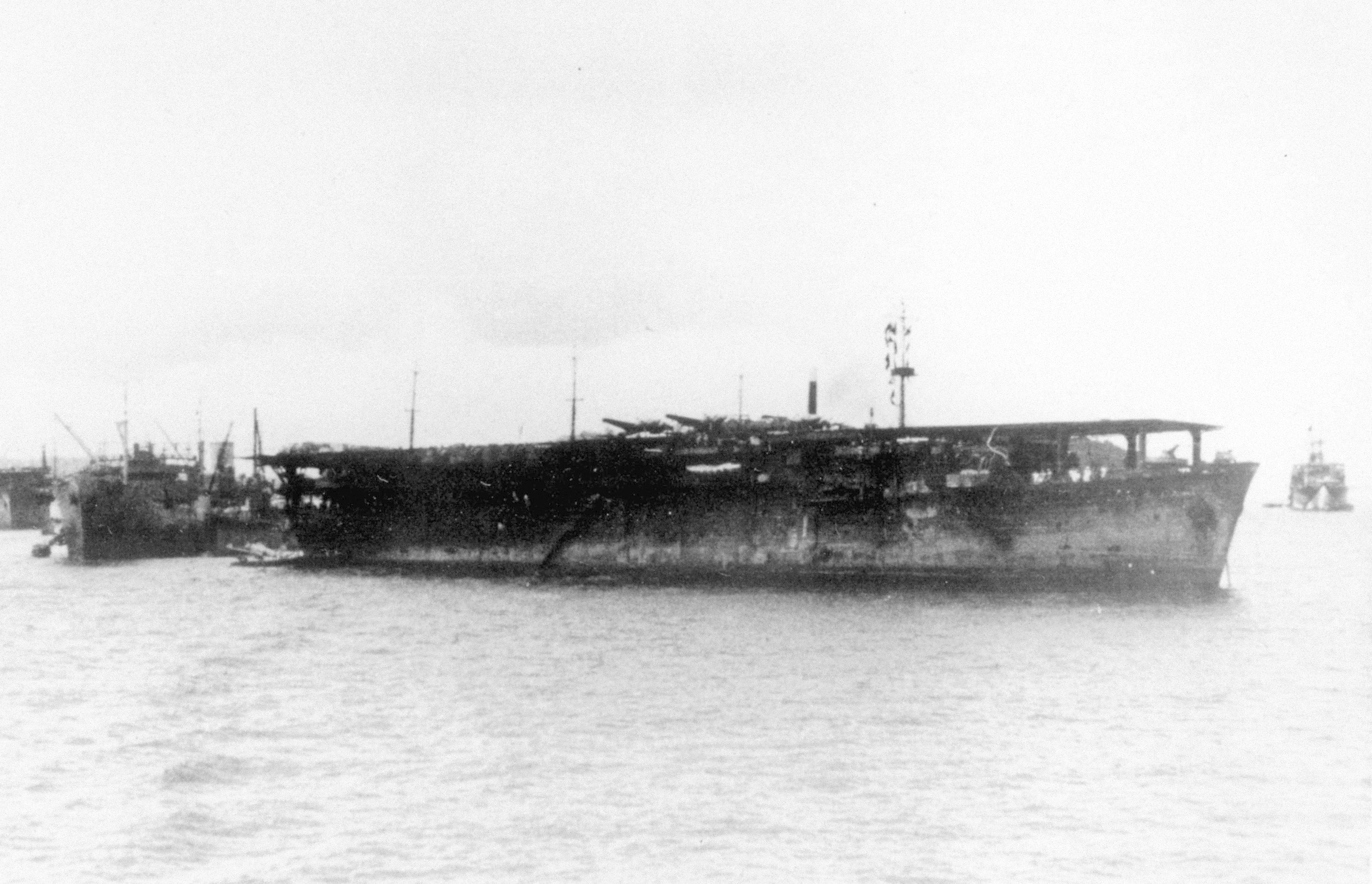
- Chūyō at anchor, Truk, 18 May 1943

History

Japan
- Name: Nitta Maru
- Operator: Nippon Yusen Kaisha
- Builder: Mitsubishi Shipbuilding & Engineering Co., Nagasaki, Japan
- Yard number: 750
- Laid down: 9 May 1938
- Launched: 20 May 1939
- Maiden voyage: 23 March 1940
- Fate: Transferred to the Imperial Japanese Navy, 1942

Empire of Japan
- Commissioned: 25 November 1942
- Renamed: Chūyō, 31 August 1942
- Stricken: 5 February 1944
- Fate: Torpedoed and sunk, 4 December 1943

General characteristics (as converted)
- Class & type: Taiyō-class escort carrier
- Displacement: 18,116 t (17,830 long tons) (standard); 20,321 t (20,000 long tons) (normal)
- Length: 180.2 m (591 ft 4 in) (o/a)
- Beam: 22.5 m (73 ft 10 in)
- Draft: 7.7 m (25 ft 5 in)
- Installed power: 25,200 shp (18,800 kW); 4 × water-tube boilers
- Propulsion: 2 × shafts; 2 × Kampon geared steam turbines
- Speed: 21 knots (39 km/h; 24 mph)
- Range: 6,500 or 8,500 nmi (12,000 or 15,700 km; 7,500 or 9,800 mi) at 18 knots (33 km/h; 21 mph)
- Complement: 850
- Armament: 4 × twin 12.7 cm (5 in) dual-purpose guns; 4 × twin 25 mm (1.0 in) AA guns
- Aircraft carried: 30

Chūyō (冲鷹, "hawk which soars") was a Taiyō-class escort carrier originally built as Nitta Maru (新田 丸), the first of her class of three passenger-cargo liners built in Japan during the late 1930s. She was requisitioned by the Imperial Japanese Navy (IJN) in late 1941 and was converted into an escort carrier in 1942. She spent most of her service ferrying aircraft, cargo and passengers to Truk until she was torpedoed and sunk by an American submarine in late 1943 with heavy loss of life. When it went down, of over 1280 people on board, 161 were saved. The ship was carrying 21 American prisoners of war that had survived the sinking of USS Sculpin, and of them only one survived.

== Civilian service ==
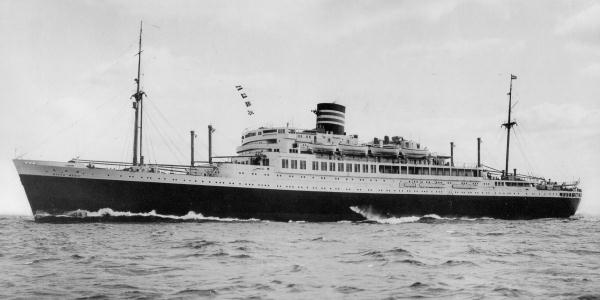
Nitta Maru in passenger service, 1940

Nitta Maru was the lead ship of her class and was built by Mitsubishi Shipbuilding & Engineering Co. at their Nagasaki shipyard for Nippon Yusen Kaisha (NYK). She was laid down on 9 May 1938 as yard number 750, launched on 20 May 1939 and completed on 23 March 1940. The IJN subsidized all three Nitta Maru-class ships for possible conversion into auxiliary aircraft carriers. The ships were intended to upgrade NYK's passenger service to Europe and it was reported that Nitta Maru was the first ship to be fully air conditioned in the passenger quarters. The ships had accommodation for 285 passengers (127 first class, 88 second and 70 third). The start of World War II in September 1939 restricted them to the Pacific and they served on the San Francisco run until the Japanese Government declared a ban on all voyages to the United States in August 1941.

The 17,163-gross register ton (GRT) vessel had a length of 170.0 meters (557.8 ft), a beam of 22.5 meters (73.8 ft) and a depth of hold of 12.4 meters (40.7 ft). She had a net tonnage of 9,397 and a cargo capacity of 11,800 tons. The ship was powered by two sets of geared steam turbines made by the shipbuilder, each driving one propeller shaft, using steam produced by four water-tube boilers. The turbines were rated at a total of 25,200 shaft horsepower (18,800 kW) that gave her an average speed of 19 knots (35 km/h; 22 mph) and a maximum speed of 22.2 knots (41.1 km/h; 25.5 mph). (Note: Watts and Gordon and Stille say that the ship was originally equipped with diesel engines that were replaced during the conversion by steam turbines, but this is contradicted by The Times and Lloyd's Register. This also seems unlikely as the conversion only took about five months when the conversion of the diesel-powered liner Argentina Maru (Kaiyō) took eleven months. In addition, the turbines in the latter were twice as powerful as those in the Taiyō-class ships and would probably have been used if the IJN wanted to increase the speed of the Taiyōs.)

== Purchase by the navy and conversion ==
The ship was requisitioned for use as a military transport in February 1941. She made a few voyages, including one transferring roughly 1,200 American prisoners of war from Wake Island to Japan in January 1942. The ship departed on 12 January, arriving in Yokohama six days later. After unloading 20 men there, she departed for China. En route, the Japanese commander of the guard contingent, Lieutenant Toshio Sato, picked five men at random and ordered them topside. There they were ordered to kneel and he told them in Japanese: "You have killed many Japanese soldiers in battle. For what you have done you are now going to be killed ... as representatives of American soldiers." The Japanese then beheaded them. The bodies were used for bayonet practice and then thrown overboard.

Later that year the IJN decided to convert her to an escort carrier, matching her sisters Taiyō and Un'yō. The conversion took place in Kure Naval Arsenal between 1 July and 25 November 1942 and the ship was renamed Chūyō on 31 August. The Taiyō-class carriers had a flush-decked configuration that displaced 18,116 metric tons (17,830 long tons) at standard load and 20,321 metric tons (20,000 long tons) at normal load. The ships had an overall length of 180.2 meters (591 ft 4 in), a beam of 22.5 meters (73 ft 10 in) and a draft of 7.7 meters (25 ft 5 in). The flight deck was 172.0 meters (564 ft 3 in) long and 23.5 meters (77 ft) wide and no arresting gear was fitted. They had a single hangar, approximately 91.4 meters (300 ft) long, served by two centreline aircraft lifts, each 12.0 by 13.0 meters (39.4 ft × 42.7 ft). Chūyō could accommodate a total of 30 aircraft, including spares.

The changes made during the conversion limited the ship to a speed of 21.4 knots (39.6 km/h; 24.6 mph). She carried 2,290 metric tons (2,250 long tons) of fuel oil that gave her a range of 8,500 nautical miles (15,700 km; 9,800 mi) at a speed of 18 knots (33 km/h; 21 mph). (Note: Other sources give a range of 6,500 nmi (12,000 km; 7,500 mi) at that speed.) Chūyō's crew numbered 850 officers and ratings.

The ship was equipped with eight 40-caliber 12.7 cm (5.0 in) Type 89 dual-purpose guns in four twin mounts on sponsons along the sides of the hull. Her light AA consisted of eight license-built 25 mm (1.0 in) Type 96 light anti-aircraft (AA) guns in four twin-gun mounts, also in sponsons along the sides of the hull. In early 1943, the four twin 25 mm mounts were replaced by triple mounts and additional 25 mm guns were added. Chūyō had a total of 22 guns plus 5 license-built 13.2 mm (0.5 in) Type 93 anti-aircraft machineguns. The ships also received a Type 13 air search radar in a retractable installation on the flight deck at that time.

== Operational history ==
The slow speed and lack of arresting gear prevented the Taiyōs from supporting the main fleet as the IJN had intended. They were thus relegated to secondary roles; Chūyō was used primarily as an aircraft transport to and from the naval base at Truk. She made the first of her 13 trips on 12 December 1942 and was back in Yokosuka two weeks later. She made about one trip per month in 1943 and the first eventful voyage was in April. Together with her sister Taiyō and the heavy cruiser Chōkai, and escorted by six destroyers, Chūyō departed Yokosuka on 4 April and made a brief stopover at the island of Saipan three days later. On 9 April, the carrier was attacked by the submarine USS Tunny, but the detonators for the Mark 14 torpedoes were defective, causing them either to detonate early or not to detonate at all, denting Chūyō's hull.

The ship made four more trips between April and August, accompanied by her sister ship Un'yō each time, before she was given a brief refit between 9 and 18 August. The next voyage began on 7 September, this time with Taiyō in company. During the return leg on 24 September, the latter was torpedoed by USS Cabrilla. With one of Taiyō's propeller shafts damaged, Chūyō had to tow her for two days before they reached Yokosuka. Although she was transferred to the Combined Fleet on 27 September and then to the Grand Escort Command on 15 November, it made no appreciable difference to her duties as the ship continued to ferry aircraft to Truk.

On 30 November, the carrier departed Truk in company with her sister Un'yō as well as the light carrier Zuihō; the carriers were escorted by the heavy cruiser Maya and four destroyers. Chūyō and Un'yō had aboard 21 and 20 captured crewmen from the sunken submarine USS Sculpin, respectively. At 10 minutes after midnight on 4 December, Chūyō was hit in the bow by a torpedo fired by USS Sailfish at 32°30′N 143°40′E. The detonation blew off her bow and caused the forward part of the flight deck to collapse. To reduce pressure on the interior bulkheads, the ship's captain began steaming in reverse at half speed towards Yokosuka. Nearly six hours later, she was again torpedoed by Sailfish at 05:55, this time twice in the port engine room, at 31°55′N 143°30′E. The hits disabled her engines and Maya and one destroyer came alongside to render assistance. Sailfish attacked again at 08:42 and hit the carrier with one or two torpedoes on the port side. The hits caused massive flooding and Chūyō capsized very quickly to port six minutes later. There were very few survivors because of the speed at which she sank. Only 161 crewmen and passengers were saved, including one American prisoner of war; 737 passengers and 513 crewmen were lost. (Note: It is uncertain if the 20 PoWs who did not survive are included in the tally of 737 passengers lost or not.) She was stricken from the Navy Directory on 5 February 1944.

== Notable passengers ==
- Itaru Tachibana (spy) - Boarded on 21 June 1941 from San Francisco to Japan, forced to leave the U.S. due to being accused of espionage.

== See also ==
- List by death toll of ships sunk by submarines
