= Taiyō-class escort carrier =

Escort carrier class of the Imperial Japanese Navy

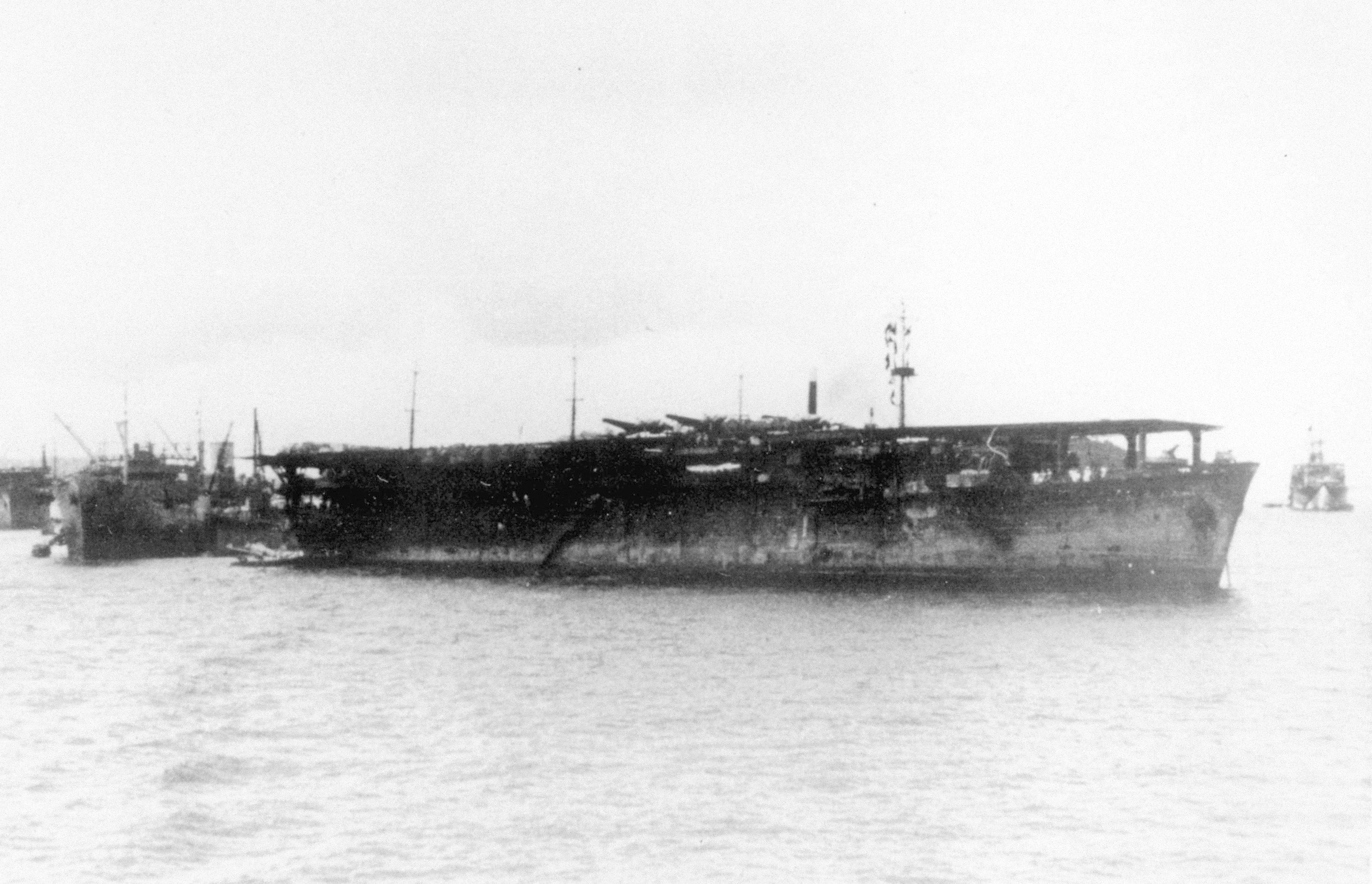
- Chūyō at anchor

Class overview
- Name: Taiyō class
- Operators: Imperial Japanese Navy
- Preceded by: None
- Succeeded by: Kaiyō
- Built: 1938–1941
- In service: 1941–1944
- Completed: 3
- Lost: 3

General characteristics (as converted)
- Type: Escort carrier
- Displacement: 18,120 t (17,830 long tons) (standard); 20,321 t (20,000 long tons) (normal)
- Length: 180.2 m (591 ft 4 in) (o/a)
- Beam: 22.5 m (73 ft 10 in)
- Draught: 7.7–8 m (25 ft 3 in – 26 ft 3 in)
- Installed power: 25,200 shp (18,800 kW); 4 × water-tube boilers
- Propulsion: 2 × shafts; 2 × geared steam turbines
- Speed: 21 knots (39 km/h; 24 mph)
- Range: 6,500 or 8,500 nmi (12,000 or 15,700 km; 7,500 or 9,800 mi) at 18 knots (33 km/h; 21 mph)
- Complement: 747 or 850
- Armament: 4 × twin 12.7 cm (5 in) dual-purpose guns or; 6 × single 12 cm (4.7 in) AA guns; 4 × twin 2.5 cm (0.98 in) AA guns
- Aircraft carried: 27–30

The Taiyō-class escort carrier (大鷹型航空母艦, Taiyō-gata Kōkū-bokan) was a group of three escort carriers used by the Imperial Japanese Navy (IJN) during World War II. Two of the ships were built as cargo liners in the late 1930s and subsequently taken over by the IJN and converted into escort carriers, while the third ship was converted while still under construction. The first ship converted, Taiyō, (Note: To reduce the possibility of confusion, this article shall use their naval names once they have been converted into carriers.) ferried aircraft and supplies to Japanese possessions before the start of the Pacific War in December 1941 and also served as a training ship between transport missions. Once the war began she did much the same for the newly conquered areas. Her sister ship, Un'yō did much the same in 1942. Chuyō, the last of the three to be converted, only ferried aircraft between Japan and the naval base at Truk before she was sunk by an American submarine in December 1943. Her sisters sometimes had destinations other than Truk in 1943, but it was also their primary destination until they were damaged by American submarines in late 1943 or early 1944. After finishing their repairs in 1944, the sisters combined convoy escort duties with their transport missions and often ventured as far south as Singapore. Taiyō was the first of the pair to be sunk, torpedoed by an American submarine in August, with Un'yō following her sister a month later.

== Background and description ==
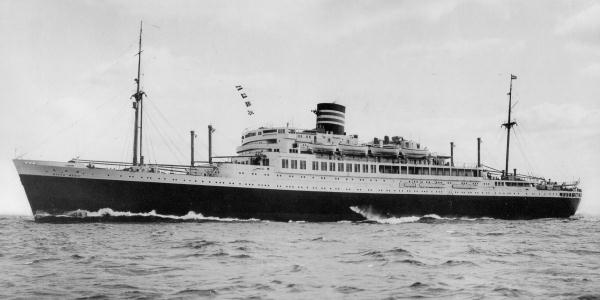
Nitta Maru in passenger service, 1940

These ships were Nitta Maru-class cargo liners built by Mitsubishi at their Nagasaki shipyard for the shipping lines Nippon Yusen Kaisha (NYK) and Osaka Shosen Kaisha (OSK). Nitta Maru and Yawata Maru were ordered for NYK and both were completed before the beginning of the Pacific War in December 1941. The ships were intended for service to Europe, but the start of World War II in September 1939 restricted them to the Pacific. Kasuga Maru had been ordered by OSK and was fitting out when she was acquired by the IJN in 1940 and towed to Sasebo Naval Arsenal on 1 May 1941 to finish her conversion into an escort carrier. (Note: Sources are contradictory regarding when the conversion occurred and if the ship was completed before the conversion began. Stille and Watts & Gordon say the conversion began while the ship was under construction. This is indirectly supported by the allocation of a new yard number, 888, to the ship. Tully, on the other hand, says that she was requisitioned on 10 February 1941 and was used as a transport until the conversion began on 1 May.) She was the first ship to be completed as her sister ships were not converted until 1942.

The Nitta Maru-class ships were 17,163-gross register ton (GRT) cargo liners that had a length of 170 metres (557 ft 9 in), a beam of 22.5 metres (73 ft 10 in) and a depth of hold of 12.4 metres (40 ft 8 in). They had a net tonnage of 9,397 and a cargo capacity of 11,800 tons. They had accommodations for 285 passengers (127 first class, 88 second and 70 third). The ships were powered by two sets of geared steam turbines made by the shipbuilder, each driving one propeller shaft, using steam produced by four water-tube boilers. The turbines were rated at a total of 25,200 shaft horsepower (18,800 kW) that gave them an average speed of 19 knots (35 km/h; 22 mph) and a maximum speed of 22.2 knots (41.1 km/h; 25.5 mph). (Note: Watts and Gordon and Stille say that the ships were originally equipped with diesel engines that were replaced during the conversion by steam turbines, but this is contradicted by The Times and Lloyd's Register. This also seems unlikely as the conversion only took about five months when the conversion of the diesel-powered liner Argentina Maru (Kaiyō) took eleven months. In addition, the turbines in the latter were twice as powerful as those in the Taiyō-class ships and would probably have been used if the IJN wanted to increase the speed of the Taiyōs.)

The conversion of the Taiyō-class ships, as the former liners were now known, was fairly austere and they were flush-decked carriers that displaced 18,120 tonnes (17,830 long tons) at standard load and 20,321 tonnes (20,000 long tons) at normal load. The ships had an overall length of 180.2 metres (591 ft 4 in), a beam of 22.5 metres (73 ft 10 in) and a draught of 7.7–8 metres (25 ft 3 in – 26 ft 3 in). As carriers they had a speed of 21 knots (39 km/h; 24 mph). The uptakes for the boilers were trunked together into a downward-curving funnel on the starboard side of the hull amidships. The ships carried 2,290 tonnes (2,250 long tons) of fuel oil that gave them a range of 6,500 nautical miles (12,000 km; 7,500 mi) at a speed of 18 knots (33 km/h; 21 mph). (Note: Other sources give a range of 8,500 nmi (15,700 km; 9,800 mi) at that speed.) Taiyō's crew numbered 747 officers and ratings while her sisters had 850 officers and crewmen.

The flight deck was 172 metres (564 ft 3 in) long and 23.5 metres (77 ft) wide. The ships had a single hangar, approximately 91.4 metres (300 ft) long, served by two centreline aircraft lifts, each 12 by 13 metres (39.4 ft × 42.7 ft). Taiyō could accommodate a total of 27 aircraft, including four spares, and her sisters had a capacity of 30 aircraft. Although larger, faster and having a larger aircraft-carrying capacity than their western counterparts, these ships were unsuited to a traditional carrier role as they lacked arresting gear.

=== Armament ===
Taiyō, as the first ship completed, had an armament of six single 45-calibre 12 cm (4.7 in) 10th Year Type anti-aircraft (AA) guns in sponsons along the sides of the hull. The guns had a maximum elevation of +75° which gave them a range of 16,600 metres (18,200 yd) and a ceiling of 10,000 metres (33,000 ft). They fired 20.41-kilogram (45.0 lb) projectiles at a rate at 10–11 rounds per minute at a muzzle velocity of 825–830 m/s (2,710–2,720 ft/s). Her light AA consisted of eight license-built 2.5 cm (1 in) Type 96 in four twin-gun mounts, also in sponsons along the sides of the hull. They fired 0.25-kilogram (8.8 oz) projectiles at a muzzle velocity of 900 m/s (3,000 ft/s); at 50°, this provided a maximum range of 7,500 metres (8,202 yd), and an effective ceiling of 5,500 metres (18,000 ft). The maximum effective rate of fire was only between 110 and 120 rounds per minute due to the need to frequently change the fifteen-round magazines.

Chūyō and Un'yō were equipped with eight more modern 40-caliber 12.7 cm (5 in) Type 89 dual-purpose guns in four twin mounts on sponsons along the sides of the hull. They fired 23.45-kilogram (51.7 lb) projectiles at a rate between 8 and 14 rounds per minute at a muzzle velocity of 700–725 m/s (2,300–2,380 ft/s); at 45°, this provided a maximum range of 14,800 metres (16,200 yd), and a maximum ceiling of 9,400 metres (30,800 ft). They also had eight 2.5 cm Type 96 AA guns like Taiyō.

In early 1943, the four twin 2.5 cm mounts were replaced by triple mounts and varying numbers of additional Type 96 guns were added. Taiyō and Un'yō received a total of 24 guns in eight triple mounts while Chūyō had a total of 22 guns plus 5 license-built 13.2 mm (0.5 in) Type 93 anti-aircraft machineguns. The ships also received a Type 13 early-warning radar in a retractable installation on the flight deck at that time. The following year, Taiyō's 12 cm guns were replaced by four 12.7 cm Type 89 guns in twin mounts. In addition, Taiyō and Un'yō had their 2.5 cm guns increased to a total of 64 weapons.

== Ships ==
Construction data
Name	Kanji	Original name	Laid down	Launched	Commissioned (as carrier)	Fate
Chūyō	冲鷹	Nitta Maru	9 May 1938	20 May 1939	25 November 1942	Sunk by USS Sailfish, 4 December 1943
Un'yō	雲鷹	Yawata Maru	14 December 1938	31 October 1939	31 May 1942	Sunk by USS Barb, 17 September 1944
Taiyō	大鷹	Kasuga Maru	6 January 1940	19 September 1940	2 September 1941	Sunk by USS Rasher, 18 August 1944

== Service history ==
Nitta Maru was requisitioned by the IJN in February 1941 and was followed by Yawata Maru in October. Among other tasks they were used to transport prisoners of war before beginning their conversion into escort carriers in 1942. All three ships received their naval names on 31 August.

Completed before the start of the Pacific War, Taiyō ferried aircraft, supplies, and personnel between Japanese bases and trained naval aviators in between transport missions. On 15 July, the ship and her sister Un'yō were assigned to the Combined Fleet. Upon receiving news of the American landings on Guadalcanal on 7 August, Taiyō and the battleship Yamato together with the 2nd and 3rd Fleets sailed from Japan bound for Truk on 17 August. Taiyō was detached from the fleet to deliver aircraft to the Marshall Islands on 27 August and then returned to Truk. In September the ship transferred supplies and equipment from Truk to the Philippines, Formosa and Palau; on the return voyage she was torpedoed by an American submarine. After receiving emergency repairs at Truk, the ship was sent to Japan for permanent repairs in October.

Her conversion and work up completed by the end of June 1942, Un'yō made three voyages from Japan to Truk, Saipan, and Rabaul between July and October. From late October to early January 1943, she ferried aircraft from Japan to the Philippines, Palau, the Dutch East Indies and Truk. Taiyō began transporting aircraft from Japan to Formosa and Truk at the beginning of November. Chu'yō's conversion was finished in November 1942 and she spent the next year exclusively ferrying aircraft to Truk, usually in company with one or the other of her sisters. Chu'yō and Taiyō were in company on 24 September 1943 when the latter was torpedoed; Chu'yō had to tow her to Yokosuka as one propeller shaft had been damaged by the torpedo hit. Chu'yō herself was torpedoed by the submarine USS Sailfish on 4 December; the hit blew off her bow and she had to steam in reverse. The submarine torpedoed her twice more later that day and disabled her engines. The third attack finally caused her capsize with heavy losses.

After Taiyō's repairs were completed in November 1943, she was transferred to the Grand Escort Command and began a refit that lasted until April 1944. Un'yō was also transferred to the Grand Escort Command in December 1943, but she continued her ferry missions to Truk. While returning from one, the ship was torpedoed in the bow on 19 January 1944, causing it to sag. While en route to Japan, part of her bow broke off in a storm and caused the forward end of the flight deck to collapse. She had to steam stern-first to Yokosuka for repairs that were completed at the end of June. Taiyō began escorted convoys to Manila, Formosa and Singapore after her refit was completed. She was torpedoed by the submarine USS Rasher on 10 August which caused her aft avgas tank to explode; the carrier sank about half-an-hour later with heavy casualties. Un'yō was only able to escort one convoy before she was sunk. During a return voyage from Singapore on 17 September, she was torpedoed by the submarine USS Barb. The torpedoes knocked out her steering gear and engines; a storm developed that night and caused severe flooding that caused her to sink the following morning.
