= Japanese aircraft carrier Taiyō =

Taiyō-class escort carrier

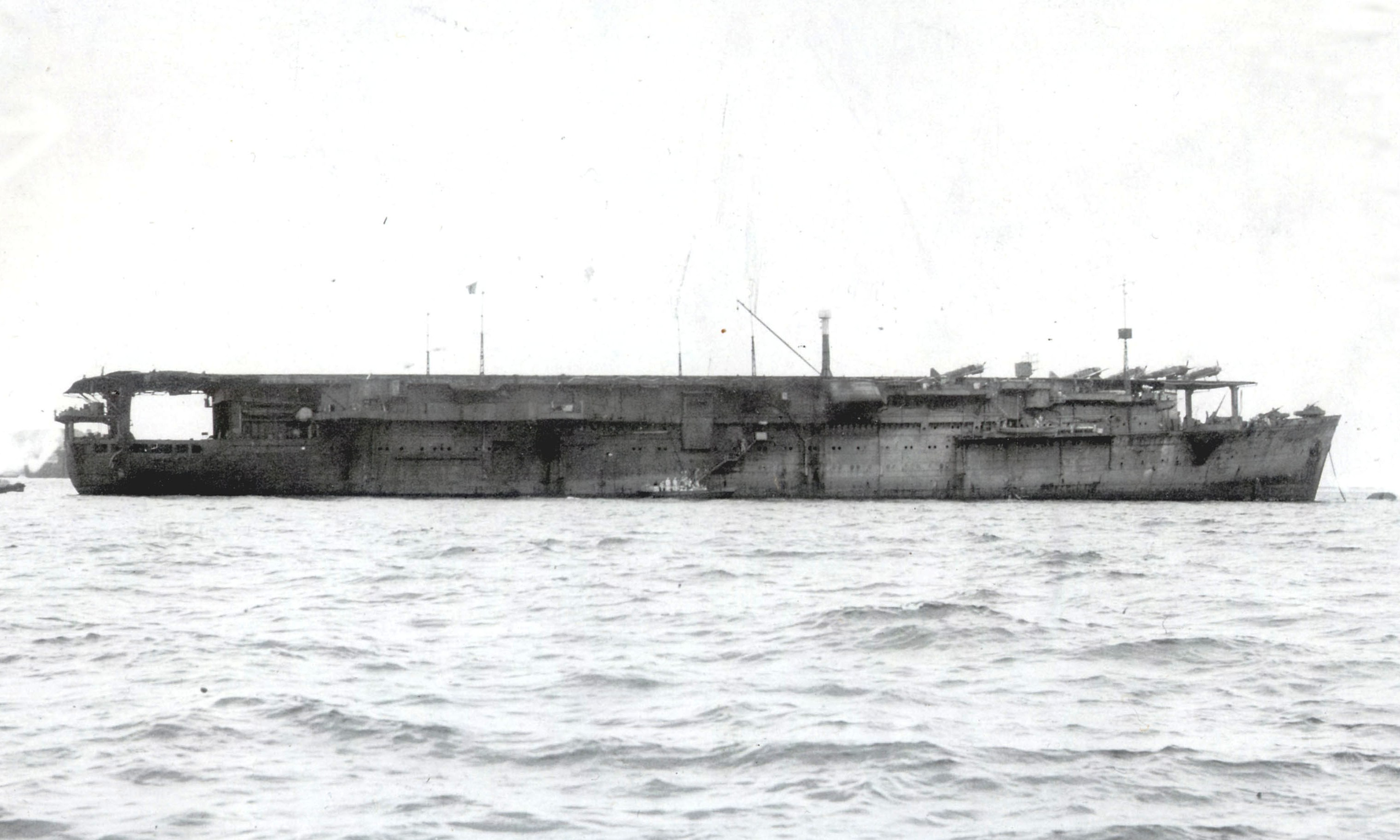
- Taiyō at anchor

History

Empire of Japan
- Name: Kasuga Maru
- Namesake: Kasuga Shrine
- Operator: NYK Line)
- Builder: Mitsubishi Shipbuilding & Engineering, Nagasaki
- Laid down: 6 January 1940
- Launched: 19 September 1940
- Fate: Transferred to the Imperial Japanese Navy, 1941
- Namesake: Goshawk
- Completed: 2 September 1941
- Acquired: 1941
- Renamed: Taiyō (大鷹) (31 August 1942)
- Fate: Sunk, 18 August 1944

General characteristics
- Class & type: Taiyō-class escort carrier
- Displacement: 18,116 t (17,830 long tons) (standard); 20,321 t (20,000 long tons) (normal)
- Length: 180.2 m (591 ft 4 in) (o/a)
- Beam: 22.5 m (73 ft 10 in)
- Draft: 7.7–8.0 m (25.4–26.25 ft)
- Installed power: 25,200 shp (18,800 kW); 4 × water-tube boilers
- Propulsion: 2 × shafts; 2 × Kampon geared steam turbines
- Speed: 21 knots (39 km/h; 24 mph)
- Range: 6,500 or 8,500 nmi (12,000 or 15,700 km; 7,500 or 9,800 mi) at 18 knots (33 km/h; 21 mph)
- Complement: 747
- Armament: 6 × single 12 cm (4.7 in) AA guns; 4 × twin 25 mm (1.0 in) AA guns
- Aircraft carried: 23 (+ 4 spares)

The Japanese aircraft carrier Taiyō (大鷹; "Great Eagle") was the lead ship of her class of three escort carriers. She was originally built as Kasuga Maru (春日丸), the last of three Nitta Maru class of passenger-cargo liners built in Japan during the late 1930s for NYK Line. The ship was requisitioned by the Imperial Japanese Navy (IJN) in early 1941 and was converted into an escort carrier. Taiyō was initially used to transport aircraft to distant air bases and for training, but was later used to escort convoys of merchant ships between Japan and Singapore. The ship was torpedoed twice by American submarines with negligible to moderate damage before she was sunk in mid-1944 with heavy loss of life.

== Civilian background and configuration ==
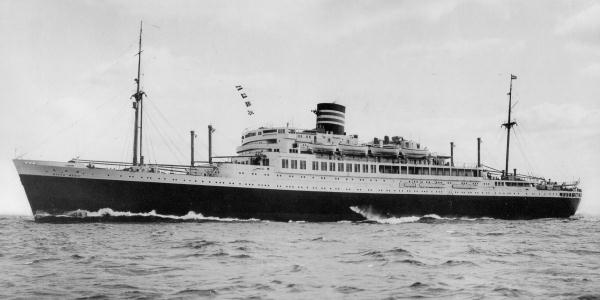
Sister ship Nitta Maru in passenger service, 1940

The Nitta Maru-class ships were intended to upgrade the passenger service of NYK (Japan Mail Shipping Line) to Europe and it was reported that Nitta Maru was the first ship to be fully air conditioned in the passenger quarters. The IJN subsidized all three Nitta Maru-class ships for possible conversion into auxiliary aircraft carriers. Kasuga Maru was the last ship of her class and was built by Mitsubishi Shipbuilding & Engineering Co. at their Nagasaki shipyard for NYK. She was laid down on 6 January 1940 as yard number 752 and launched on 19 September 1940. Sources are contradictory regarding when the conversion occurred and if the ship was completed before the conversion began. Jentschura, Jung and Mickel state that Kasuga Maru was towed to Sasebo Naval Arsenal for conversion on 1 May 1941. Stille, however, and Watts & Gordon say the conversion began while the ship was under construction. This is indirectly supported by the allocation of a new yard number, 888, to the ship. Tully, on the other hand, says that she was requisitioned on 10 February 1941 and was used as a transport until the conversion began on 1 May.

If Kasuga Maru was completed as a passenger liner, the 17,163-gross register ton (GRT) vessel would have had a length of 170.0 meters (557.8 ft), a beam of 22.5 meters (73.8 ft) and a depth of hold of 12.4 meters (40.7 ft). She would have had a net tonnage of 9,397 and a cargo capacity of 11,800 tons. The Nitta Maru class had accommodation for 285 passengers (127 first class, 88 second and 70 third).

The ships were powered by two sets of geared steam turbines made by the shipbuilder, each driving one propeller shaft, using steam produced by four water-tube boilers. The turbines were rated at a total of 25,200 shaft horsepower (18,800 kW) that gave them an average speed of 19 knots (35 km/h; 22 mph) and a maximum speed of 22.2 knots (41.1 km/h; 25.5 mph). (Note: Watts and Gordon and Stille say that the ships were originally equipped with diesel engines that were replaced during the conversion by steam turbines, but this is contradicted by The Times and Lloyd's Register. This also seems unlikely as the conversion only took about five months when the conversion of the diesel-powered liner Argentina Maru (Kaiyō) took eleven months. In addition, the turbines in the latter were twice as powerful as those in the Taiyō-class ships and would probably have been used if the IJN wanted to increase the speed of the Taiyōs.)

== Conversion and description ==
Kasuga Maru's conversion was completed at Sasebo Naval Arsenal on 2 or 5 or 15 September 1941. The Taiyō-class carriers had a flush-decked configuration that displaced 18,116 metric tons (17,830 long tons) at standard load and 20,321 metric tons (20,000 long tons) at normal load. They had an overall length of 180.2 meters (591 ft 4 in), a beam of 22.5 meters (73 ft 10 in) and a draft of 7.7 meters (25 ft 5 in). The flight deck was 172.0 meters (564 ft 3 in) long and 23.5 meters (77 ft) wide and no arresting gear was fitted. The ships had a single hangar, approximately 91.4 meters (300 ft) long, served by two centreline aircraft lifts, each 12.0 by 13.0 meters (39.4 ft × 42.7 ft). Unlike her sister ships, Kasuga Maru could accommodate 23 aircraft, plus 4 spares.

The changes made during the conversion limited the ship to a speed of 21.4 knots (39.6 km/h; 24.6 mph). She carried 2,290 metric tons (2,250 long tons) of fuel oil that gave her a range of 8,500 nautical miles (15,700 km; 9,800 mi) at a speed of 18 knots (33 km/h; 21 mph). (Note: Other sources give a range of 6,500 nmi (12,000 km; 7,500 mi) at that speed.) Kasuga Maru's crew numbered 747 officers and ratings.

The ship was equipped with six 12-centimeter (4.7 in) 10th Year Type anti-aircraft (AA) guns in single mounts on sponsons along the sides of the hull. Her light AA consisted of eight license-built 25-millimeter (1.0 in) Type 96 light AA guns in four twin mounts, also in sponsons along the sides of the hull. In early 1943, the 25 mm twin mounts were replaced by triple mounts and additional 25 mm guns were added. Taiyō had a total of 22 guns plus 5 license-built 13.2 mm (0.5 in) Type 93 anti-aircraft machineguns. The ship also received a Type 13 air-search radar in a retractable installation on the flight deck at that time. In July 1944, the 12-centimeter guns were replaced by two twin mounts for 12.7 cm (5.0 in) Type 89 dual-purpose guns and the light AA armament was augmented to a total of sixty-four 25-millimeter guns and ten 13.2-millimeter machine guns.

== Career ==
Before the start of the Pacific War on 7 December 1941, Kasuga Maru had made two voyages to Formosa and Palau, including one ferrying Mitsubishi A5M (Allied reporting name: "Claude") fighters to Palau just days before the beginning of the war. In between transport missions, the ship trained naval aviators. Shortly after Kasuga Maru arrived at Rabaul on 11 April, the harbor was bombed twice, although the ship was not damaged in the attacks. On 14 July, she was assigned to the Combined Fleet, together with her sister, Un'yō. Upon receiving news of the American landings on Guadalcanal on 7 August, Kasuga Maru and the battleship Yamato, escorted by a pair of destroyers, together with the 2nd and 3rd Fleets sailed from the Inland Sea bound for Truk. On 27 August, the carrier was detached from the main body and sent to deliver aircraft to Taroa Island in the Marshalls. She arrived two days later and then departed on 30 August for Truk. The following day, Kasuga Maru was formally renamed Taiyō (大鷹, “goshawk”).

After arriving in Truk on 4 September, the ship was sent to Palau, Davao City, and Kavieng. En route to Truk, she was torpedoed by the submarine USS Trout on 28 September 1942. Taiyō was hit once, killing 13 crewmen, but was able to continue to Truk for emergency repairs. She left for Japan on 4 October for permanent repairs that were not completed until the 26th. The ship then resumed ferrying aircraft from Japan to Truk and Kavieng on 1 November. In February–March 1943, she was accompanied by Un'yō. The following month, Un'yō was replaced by Chūyō. En route to Truk, she was again torpedoed by an American submarine; this time, however, the four torpedoes fired by USS Tunny on 9 April failed to explode. Taiyō and Chūyō, escorted by two destroyers departed Truk, bound for Yokosuka, Japan, on 16 April. After another voyage to Truk and Mako, Formosa, the ship was briefly refitted at Sasebo. While returning from Truk on 6 September, Taiyō was unsuccessfully attacked by USS Pike. Almost three weeks later, the ship was torpedoed by USS Cabrilla. The hit wrecked her starboard propeller and temporarily knocked out power so she had to be towed to Yokosuka by Chūyō. Repairs began once she arrived and lasted until 11 November.

In December 1943, Taiyō was assigned to the Grand Escort Command and she began a lengthy refit at Yokohama that completed on 4 April 1944. On the 29th, the ship was assigned to the First Surface Escort Unit and she escorted Convoy HI-61 from Japan to Singapore, via Manila. Upon arrival at her destination on 18 May, Taiyō was tasked to escort Convoy HI-62 home. After arriving on 8 June, the ship was assigned to carry aircraft to Manila, departing on 12 July. En route, she joined up with the escort of Convoy HI-69 and arrived there on the 20th. Taiyō then escorted a convoy to Formosa and then back to Japan. On 10 August, the ship escorted Convoy HI-71 to Singapore, via Mako and Manila. Eight days later, off Cape Bolinao, Luzon, Taiyō was hit in the stern by a torpedo fired by USS Rasher. The hit caused the carrier's aft avgas tank to explode, and Taiyō sank 28 minutes later at coordinates 18°10′N 120°22′E. The number of crew aboard is unknown, but 350–400 was common practice at that time. Coupled with the 400-odd survivors rescued and the authorized complement of 834, that suggests that approximately 390 crew were lost in the sinking.

== See also ==
- List by death toll of ships sunk by submarines
