= Japanese aircraft carrier Un'yō =

Taiyō-class escort carrier

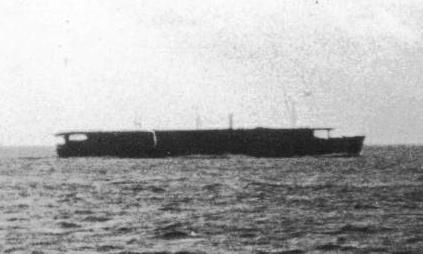
- Un'yō in military service in 1943

History

Empire of Japan
- Name: Yawata Maru
- Namesake: Yawata shrine
- Operator: Nippon Yusen Kaisha
- Builder: Mitsubishi Shipbuilding & Engineering Co., Nagasaki, Japan
- Yard number: 751
- Laid down: 14 December 1938
- Launched: 31 October 1939
- Completed: 31 July 1940
- In service: 1940
- Fate: Transferred to the Imperial Japanese Navy, 1941

Empire of Japan
- Commissioned: 31 May 1942
- Out of service: 17 September 1944
- Renamed: Un'yō, 31 August 1942
- Fate: Sunk, 17 September 1944

General characteristics (as converted)
- Class & type: Taiyō-class escort carrier
- Displacement: 18,116 t (17,830 long tons) (standard); 20,321 t (20,000 long tons) (normal)
- Length: 180.2 m (591 ft 4 in) (o/a)
- Beam: 22.5 m (73 ft 10 in)
- Draft: 7.7 m (25 ft 5 in)
- Installed power: 25,200 shp (18,800 kW); 4 × water-tube boilers
- Propulsion: 2 × shafts; 2 × Kampon geared steam turbines
- Speed: 21 knots (39 km/h; 24 mph)
- Range: 6,500 or 8,500 nmi (12,000 or 15,700 km; 7,500 or 9,800 mi) at 18 knots (33 km/h; 21 mph)
- Complement: 850
- Armament: 4 × twin 12.7 cm (5 in) dual-purpose guns; 4 × twin 2.5 cm (1 in) AA guns
- Aircraft carried: 30

Un'yō (雲鷹, Cloud Hawk) was a Taiyō-class escort carrier originally built as Yawata Maru (八幡丸), one of three Nitta Maru-class cargo liners built in Japan during the late 1930s. She was transferred to the Imperial Japanese Navy (IJN) during the Pacific War, renamed, and was converted into an escort carrier in 1942. The ship spent most of her service ferrying aircraft, cargo and passengers to various bases in the Pacific. Un'yō was badly damaged by an American submarine in early 1944. After repairs were completed in June, the ship resumed transporting aircraft and cargo. During a return voyage from Singapore in September, she was sunk by the submarine USS Barb.

== Construction and civilian service ==
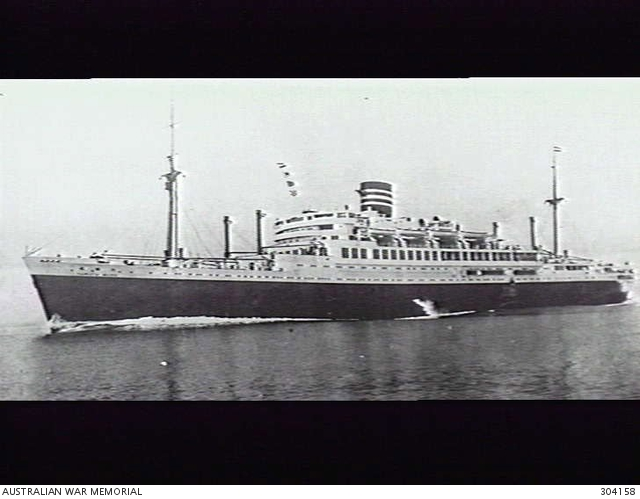
Japanese passenger liner SS Yawata Maru

Yawata Maru was the second of three ships of the Nitta Maru class and was built by Mitsubishi Shipbuilding & Engineering Co. at their Nagasaki shipyard for Nippon Yusen Kaisha (NYK). She was laid down on 14 December 1938 as yard number 751, launched on 31 October 1939 and completed on 31 July 1940. The IJN subsidized all three Nitta Maru-class ships for possible conversion into auxiliary aircraft carriers. The ships were intended for service to Europe, but the start of World War II in September 1939 restricted them to the Pacific.

The 17,163-gross register ton (GRT) vessel had a length of 170.0 meters (557.8 ft), a beam of 22.5 meters (73.8 ft) and a depth of hold of 12.4 meters (40.7 ft). She had a net tonnage of 9,379. The ship was powered by two sets of geared steam turbines, each driving one propeller shaft, using steam produced by four water-tube boilers. The turbines were rated at a total of 25,200 shaft horsepower (18,800 kW) that gave her an average speed of 19 knots (35 km/h; 22 mph) and a maximum speed of 22.2 knots (41.1 km/h; 25.5 mph).

== Conversion ==
The ship was requisitioned by the IJN in October 1941 and was initially used to transport prisoners of war. Between 25 November and 31 May 1942, Yawata Maru was converted into an escort carrier at Kure Naval Arsenal and she was renamed Un'yō on 31 August.

The Taiyō-class carriers had a flush-decked configuration that displaced 18,116 metric tons (17,830 long tons) at standard load and 20,321 metric tons (20,000 long tons) at normal load. The ships had an overall length of 180.2 meters (591 ft 4 in), a beam of 22.5 meters (73 ft 10 in) and a draft of 7.7 meters (25 ft 5 in). The flight deck was 172.0 meters (564 ft 3 in) long and 23.5 meters (77 ft) wide. They had a single hangar, approximately 91.4 meters (300 ft) long, served by two centreline aircraft lifts. Un'yō could accommodate a total of 30 aircraft, including spares, although no arresting gear was fitted.

The changes made during the conversion limited the ship to a speed of 21.4 knots (39.6 km/h; 24.6 mph). Un'yō carried enough fuel oil to give her a range of 8,500 nautical miles (15,700 km; 9,800 mi) at a speed of 18 knots (33 km/h; 21 mph). (Note: Other sources give a range of 6,500 nmi (12,000 km; 7,500 mi) at that speed.) Un'yō's crew totaled 850 officers and enlisted men.

The ship was equipped with eight 12.7 cm (5 in) Type 89 dual-purpose guns in four twin mounts on sponsons along the sides of the hull. Her light anti-aircraft armament consisted of eight 2.5 cm (1 in) Type 96 light anti-aircraft (AA) guns in four twin-gun mounts, also in sponsons along the sides of the hull. In early 1943, the four twin 2.5 cm mounts were replaced by triple mounts and four additional triple mounts were added. She also received a Type 21 early-warning radar in a retractable installation on the flight deck at that time. The following year, Un'yō's light AA armament was increased to a total of 64 weapons.

== Operational history ==
Un'yō made three voyages from Japan to Truk, Saipan, and Rabaul between July and October 1942, during which she delivered 10 Mitsubishi A6M Zero fighters to the latter on 11 September. Her next trip was far more involved as she ferried aircraft between Truk, the Philippines, Palau, and the Dutch East Indies. The ship departed Yokosuka on 28 October and picked up the 11th Fighter Regiment at Surabaya, Java, on 2 December and delivered them to Truk on 11 days later. Un'yō returned to Surabaya on 24 December and loaded 33 aircraft of the Imperial Japanese Army Air Force's (IJAAF) 1st Fighter Regiment for delivery to Truk before finally returning to Yokosuka in early January 1943.

After a brief refit in Yokohama, the ship loaded 36 Kawasaki Ki-48 "Lily" bombers of the IJAAF's 208th Light Bomber Regiment on 1 February and delivered them to Truk on the 7th. Over the next several months, Un'yō made multiple trips between Yokosuka and Truk, sometime accompanied by her sisters Taiyō and Chūyō. On 10 July, having loaded portions of the 201st and 552nd Naval Air Groups at Truk and accompanied by the auxiliary cruiser Aikoku Maru, the ships were attacked by the American submarines USS Halibut and USS Steelhead. Both submarines claimed hits on Un'yō and Aikoku Maru, but only the latter ship was actually struck by a single torpedo.

The carrier continued her transport missions between Japan and Truk for the rest of the year, with a brief refit at the Kure Naval Arsenal from 30 September to 9 October. On 30 November, she departed Truk in company with her sister Chūyō and the light carrier Zuihō ; the carriers were escorted by the heavy cruiser Maya and four destroyers. Chūyō and Un'yō had aboard 21 and 20 captured crewmen from the sunken submarine USS Sculpin, respectively. At 00:10 on 4 December, Chūyō was hit in the bow by a torpedo fired by USS Sailfish. The detonation blew off her bow and caused the forward part of the flight deck to collapse. To reduce pressure on the interior bulkheads, the ship's captain began steaming in reverse at half speed towards Yokosuka. She was again torpedoed by Sailfish at 05:55, this time twice in the port engine room. The hits disabled her engines and Maya and one destroyer came alongside to render assistance. Un'yō was ordered to take her sister in tow, but was then told to continue onwards to Yokosuka. The ship was transferred from the Combined Fleet to the Grand Escort Command on 5 December, it made no appreciable difference to her duties as the ship continued to ferry aircraft and supplies to Truk.

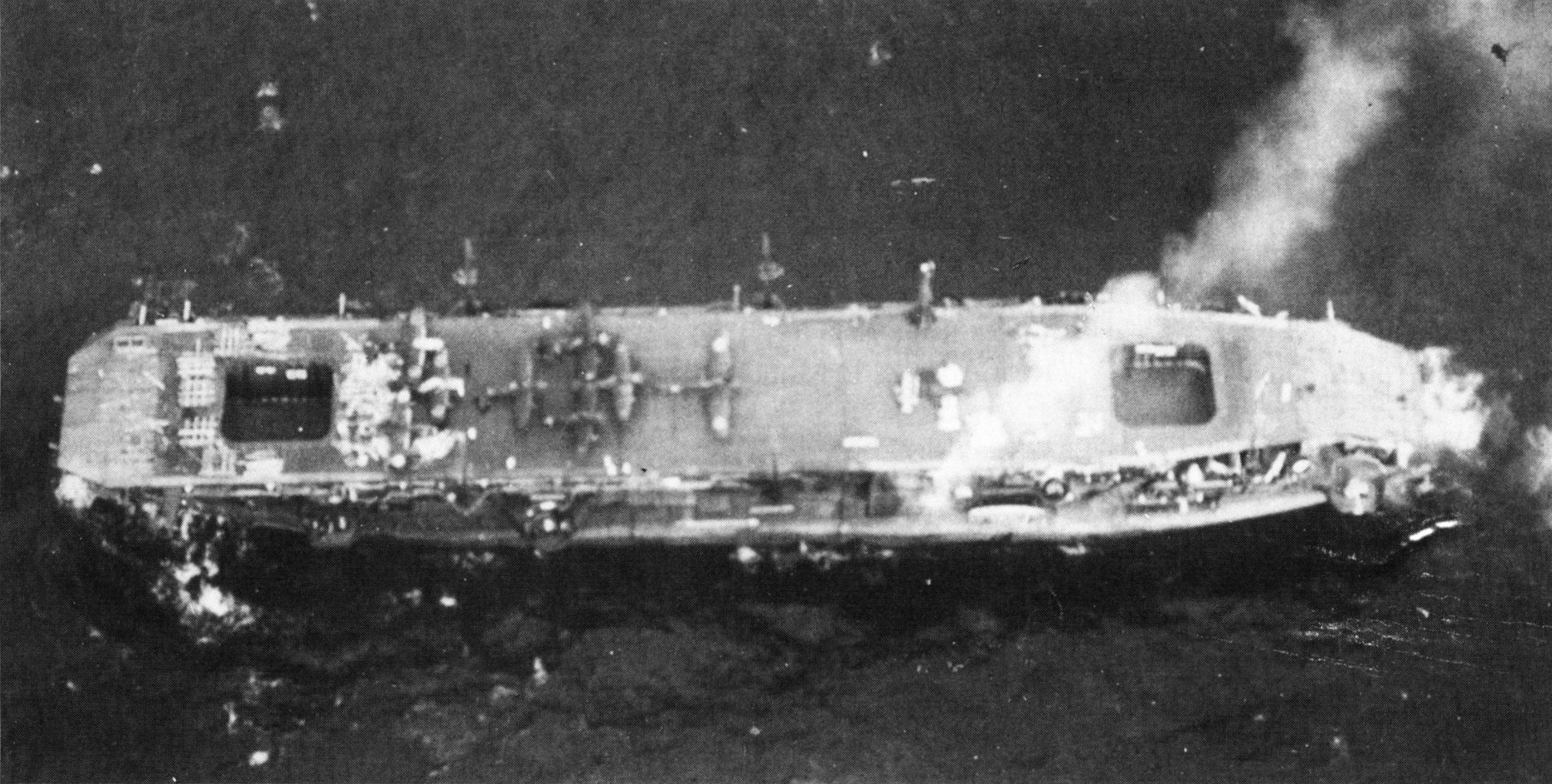
Un'yō steaming astern on 3 or 4 February

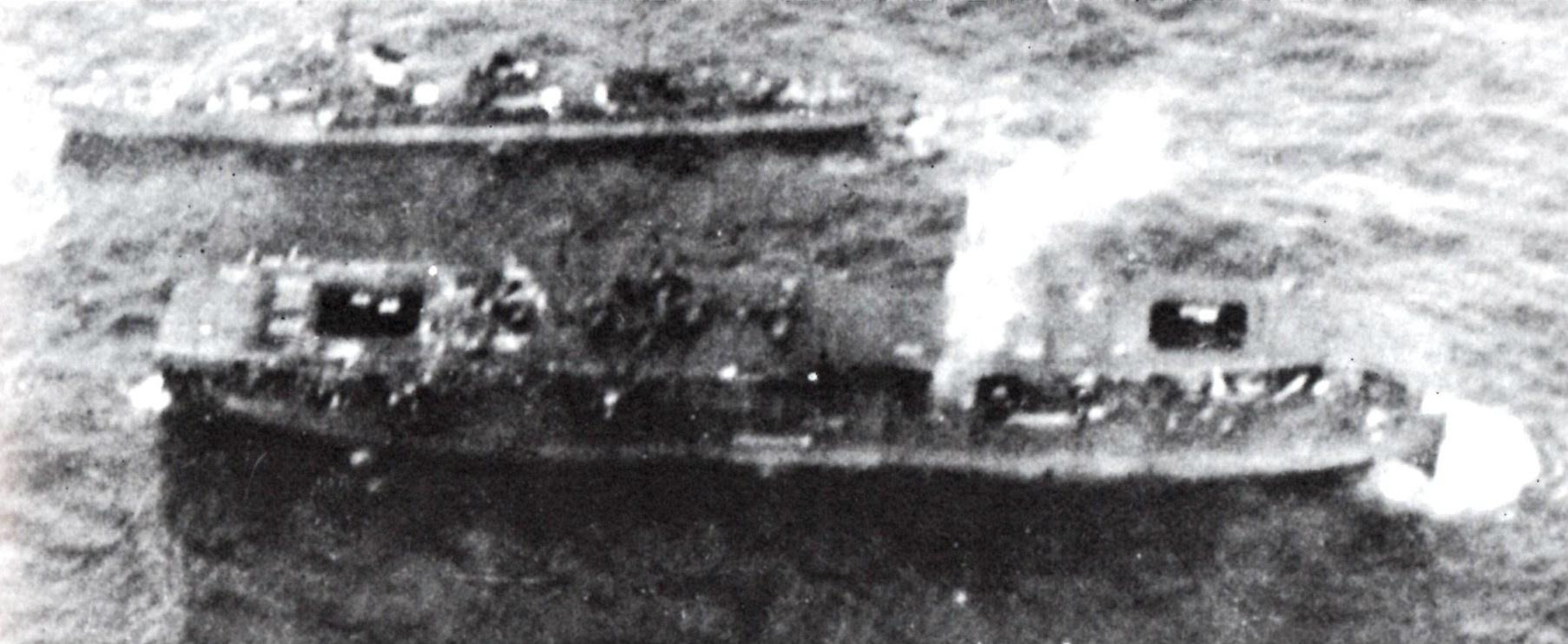
Un'yō and the destroyer Kishinami anchored off Yokosuka, 8 February 1944

On 19 January 1944, while en route to Yokosuka, she was hit by three torpedoes fired by USS Haddock, although only two detonated. Her bow was heavily damaged by them and sagged downwards. While sheltering at Garapan Anchorage, Saipan, to conduct emergency repairs, a follow-up attack by Halibut on 23 January was driven off. With repairs completed four days later, Un'yō departed for Japan at slow speed, escorted by three destroyers which drove off attacks by the submarines USS Gudgeon and USS Saury on 2 February. The convoy encountered a bad storm two days later and part of her damaged bow snapped off, causing the forepart of the flight deck to collapse. To prevent further damage, Un'yō began to steam stern-first and arrived at Yokosuka on the 8th to begin permanent repairs that were completed by 28 June.

After working up, the ship was assigned to the 1st Surface Escort Force on 14 August. She departed Moji-ku, Kitakyūshū, Japan, on 25 August as part of the escort for Convoy HI-73, together with the anti-submarine cruiser Kashii and six other escorts. Un'yō carried ten Nakajima B5N "Kate" torpedo bombers and six Kawasaki Ki-3 biplane training aircraft of the 91st Squadron on this voyage. The convoy arrived in Singapore on 25 August.

The same group of escorts protected Convoy HI-74 as it departed Singapore on 11 September. At 00:37 on 17 September, Un'yō was struck by two torpedoes fired by USS Barb, one in the engine room that knocked out her engines and the other in the steering compartment. A storm developed during the night and the force of the waves pounding on the carrier's stern collapsed the interior bulkheads despite them having been shored up. By 07:30, Un'yō had a large list to starboard and the crew was ordered to abandon ship. The carrier sank 25 minutes later, 220 nautical miles (410 km; 250 mi) southeast of Hong Kong, at 19°08′N 116°36′E, after 761 survivors had been rescued by two of the escorts. The number of people lost is not known with any precision as sources differ in the number of passengers that were aboard the ship. Un'yō reported that she had a complement of 45 officers and 781 crewmen aboard, but some sources say that she had a total of about 1,000 crew and passengers aboard. Other sources say that she had approximately 1,000 passengers of whom 800 died.
