= USS Sculpin (SS-191) =

Submarine of the United States

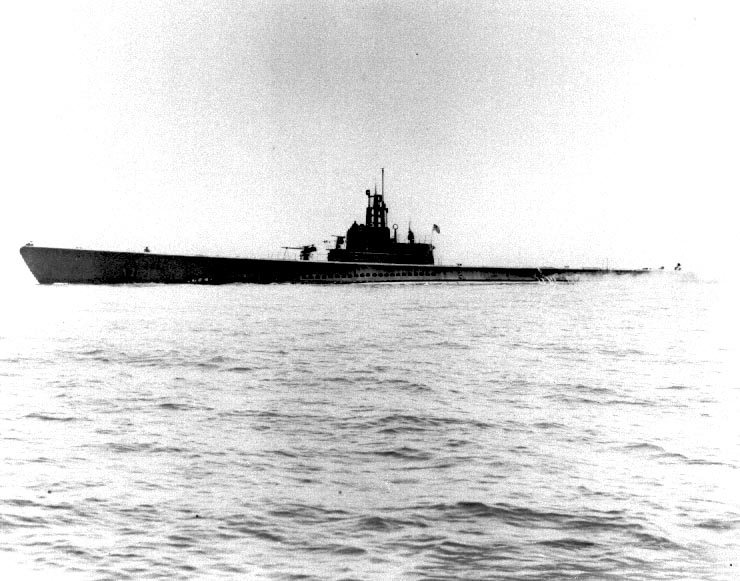
- USS Sculpin (SS-191) off San Francisco, California, on 1 May 1943, following an overhaul.

History

United States
- Builder: Portsmouth Naval Shipyard, Kittery, Maine
- Laid down: 7 September 1937
- Launched: 27 July 1938
- Commissioned: 16 January 1939
- Fate: Scuttled off Truk Lagoon on 19 November 1943 after being damaged by Japanese destroyers (8°40′N 155°02′E)

General characteristics
- Class & type: Sargo-class composite diesel-hydraulic and diesel-electric submarine
- Displacement: 1,450 long tons (1,470 t) standard, surfaced, 2,350 tons (2,388 t) submerged
- Length: 310 ft 6 in (94.64 m)
- Beam: 26 ft 10 in (8.18 m)
- Draft: 16 ft 7 1/2 in (5.067 m)
- Propulsion: 4 × General Motors Model 16-248 V16 diesel engines (two hydraulic-drive, two driving electrical generators), 2 × 126-cell Sargo batteries, 4 × high-speed General Electric electric motors with reduction gears, two shafts, 5,500 shp (4.1 MW) surfaced, 2,740 shp (2.0 MW) submerged
- Speed: 21 kn (39 km/h) surfaced, 8.75 kn (16.21 km/h) submerged
- Range: 11,000 nautical miles (20,000 km) @ 10 knots (19 km/h)
- Endurance: 48 hours @ 2 kn (3.7 km/h) submerged
- Test depth: 250 ft (76 m)
- Complement: 5 officers, 54 enlisted
- Armament: 8 × 21 inch (533 mm) torpedo tubes (four forward, four aft; 24 torpedoes), 1 × 3 in (76 mm)/50 cal deck gun, four machine guns

USS Sculpin (SS-191), a Sargo-class submarine, was the first ship of the United States Navy to be named for the sculpin.

== Construction and commissioning ==
Sculpin′s keel was laid down on 7 September 1937 at the Portsmouth Navy Yard in Kittery, Maine. She was launched on 27 July 1938, sponsored by Mrs. Bernice F. Defrees, wife of Rear Admiral Joseph R. Defrees Sr, Chief of Staff to the Commander, Scouting Force, United States Fleet; their son would later lose his life aboard Sculpin. Sculpin was commissioned on 16 January 1939, Lieutenant Warren D. Wilkin in command.

== Service history ==
=== Inter-war period ===
While on her initial shakedown cruise on 23 May 1939, Sculpin was diverted to search for Squalus, which had gone missing during a test dive. Sighting a red smoke bomb and a rescue buoy from Squalus, she established communications, first by underwater telephone and then by signals tapped in Morse code on the hull. Sculpin stood by while Falcon rescued the survivors, and rendered further assistance by familiarizing the divers with the configuration of her sister ship. Sculpin aided in the salvage of the sunken vessel by sounding out the approaches to Portsmouth, New Hampshire and preparing supplementary charts of the area where Squalus was refloated.

Following the assistance given in the recovery of Squalus, Sculpin engaged in type training off the Atlantic coast until transferred to the Pacific Fleet. Departing Portsmouth on 28 January 1940, she arrived at San Diego, California on 6 March. She sailed west on 1 April, arriving at Pearl Harbor on 9 March, where she was based for the next 18 months. Departing Pearl Harbor on 23 October 1941 as part of Submarine Division 22, she arrived at Manila on 8 November. From Cavite, she engaged in local operations and type training until war broke out.

=== First war patrol ===
Departing Cavite on the night of 8–9 December 1941, Sculpin – commanded by Lucius H. Chappell – Seawolf escorted Langley and Pecos as far as San Bernardino Strait. She then took station off Lamon Bay in the Philippine Sea north of Luzon on 10 December. "The weather was foul, the visibility abysmal." When Frederick W. Warder's Seawolf was moved, Sculpin took up her station off Aparri, departing 21 December. Three days later, a Japanese task force came ashore at the unguarded Lamon Bay. Off Aparri, Sculpin detected a target, but was unable to gain firing position. After Tarpon was twice "pooped" by heavy seas, Sculpin requested she be moved back to Lamon Bay, where she found weather so bad, she proved unable to attack Japanese shipping going in or out. Her first patrol terminated (after a duration of 45 days) at Surabaya, Java, on 22 January.

=== Second war patrol ===
Her second patrol, from 30 January-28 February, was in the Molucca Sea, east of Sulawesi. On 4 February off Kendari, Java, she fired three torpedoes at a Japanese destroyer. Two hits inflicted heavy damage. After the war, Japanese records revealed Suzukaze had beached herself, and was later salvaged. Three nights later, Sculpin detected a Japanese task force (bound for Makassar City, Celebes) made up of destroyers, cruisers, and an aircraft carrier (a startling sight, as it remained for the duration). She fired on a cruiser, missed and was detected and forced to dive. She escaped four hours later after a heavy depth charge attack by six destroyers. When she got loose, she radioed a contact report, which was not received. On the night of 17 February, she was detected while making a surface attack, firing two torpedoes each at a freighter and a destroyer, all of which missed, and she was forced to dive. During the ensuing depth charge attack, she sustained damage to her starboard main controller and starboard shaft. On 28 February, after 28 days at sea, she arrived at Fremantle for refit, falling under the command of Admiral Charles A. Lockwood.

=== Third war patrol ===
Her third patrol, from 13 March-27 April out of Fremantle, was in the Banda Sea, again off Kendari. Codebreakers got word a Japanese carrier force, Carrier Division Five, had arrived on 24 March. Two days later, this force departed Kendari; Sculpin failed to spot them, but did fire three torpedoes at a freighter, all of which missed. The torpedoes were last seen running straight for the target, but apparently ran deeper than set. A similar incident occurred on 1 April in a night attack, and within a week, a third attack with three more torpedoes had also failed. Sculpin, like many of her sister submarines in the early days of the Pacific War, was plagued by malfunctions of the Mark 14 torpedo, which ran erratically or too deep, or of the Mark VI exploder, which failed to detonate them correctly. The frustrated Sculpin returned to Fremantle on 27 April, after forty-five unproductive days on patrol.

=== Fourth war patrol ===
Sculpin's fourth war patrol, from 29 May – 17 June, was in the South China Sea. On 8 June, she was unsuccessful in an attack on a cargo ship, again due to torpedo malfunction. A vigorous depth charge attack kept Sculpin down while the cargo ship escaped. On 13 June, near Balabac Strait, she torpedoed a cargo ship which returned fire with her deck gun and commenced to limp away. Turning on two accompanying tankers astern of the cargo ship, Sculpin made an attack but was forced to dive to prevent being rammed by one of the tankers. Surfacing at dusk, Sculpin pursued the cargo ship, but was again driven away by accurate gunfire from the maru. She shifted her attack to a tanker, leaving the ship listing and making heavy smoke. However, no sinking was confirmed. Off Cape Varella, Indochina, early on the morning of 19 June, she torpedoed a cargo ship, making a hit forward of the stack. A heavy secondary explosion was heard, and the damaged vessel was last seen headed for the shore to beach, smoke pouring from her forward hatch. Sculpin returned to Australia on 17 July. She moved to Brisbane, under Ralph Waldo Christie (part of Admiral Arthur S. Carpender's 7th Fleet, and ultimately General Douglas MacArthur's South West Pacific Area command), along with the rest of Submarine Squadron Two (SubRon 2), in August.

=== Fifth war patrol ===
The waters of the Bismarck Archipelago were the theater of her fifth patrol, from 8 September-26 October. After reconnaissance off Thilenius and Montagu harbors of New Ireland, Sculpin commenced her search for Japanese shipping. On 28 September, she scored two hits on a cargo ship, but was forced to dive as a Japanese destroyer raced to the scene. Sculpin was under depth charge attack for three hours, during which she sustained minor damage. On 7 October, she made her first confirmed kill, Naminoue Maru, off New Ireland. Escaping the Japanese escorts' countermeasures, she remained in the general area where, a week later, she intercepted a three-ship convoy in the shipping lane between Rabaul and Kavieng. Waiting until the escorting destroyer had made a patrol sweep to the opposite side of the convoy, Sculpin fired a spread of four torpedoes at Sumoyoshi Maru. While the blazing ship lay dead in the water and sinking, Sculpin slipped away. Four days later, she inflicted minor damage on Yura, with a hit forward of the bridge, but was driven off by the cruiser's gunfire. For the 54-day duration of her patrol, she was credited with three ships for 24,100 tons; postwar, only two for 6,652 tons were confirmed.

=== Sixth war patrol ===
Departing Brisbane on her sixth war patrol, from 18 November 1942 – 8 January 1943, Sculpin worked her way past New Britain to the rich hunting grounds off Truk. After escaping a Japanese aerial attack on 11 December, she was put on the scent of a Japanese aircraft carrier by codebreakers. On the night of 17–18 December, she closed to 9 miles (14 km). One illuminated Sculpin with a searchlight as both commenced heavy fire with deck guns. The submarine went deep as the enemy depth charge attack and prolonged sonar search continued. The following night, she scored two hits on a tanker, with no sinking credited, and none confirmed postwar. For her 52-day patrol, Sculpin had nothing to show.

=== Refurbishment and seventh war patrol ===
Sculpin arrived at Pearl Harbor on 8 January 1943, and sailed east to San Francisco, California, spending three months in overhaul at Mare Island. Returning to Pearl Harbor on 9 May, she departed Hawaii for her seventh war patrol on 24 May and operated off the northwest coast of Honshū. Around midnight on 9 June, three days after arriving on station off Sofu Gan (also called Lot's Wife), she detected a Japanese task force consisting of two aircraft carriers with a cruiser escort. Sculpin rang up flank speed to close, but was outdistanced. She made a desperate shot, four torpedoes from 7,000 yd (6,400 m); one exploded prematurely, giving her away, and she was unable to make a stern tube shot. Two heavy underwater explosions were heard as the submarine submerged. On 14 June, she damaged a cargo ship but was forced to dive and run silent to avoid the vigorous countermeasures of the maru's escorts. On 19 June, she destroyed two sampans by gunfire, leaving them aflame, with decks awash. During the remainder of the patrol, she spotted other possible targets, but they all hugged the shore some running inside the 10 fathoms (18 m) line. The patrol terminated at Midway Island on 4 July after 41 days; she was credited with no damage.

=== Eighth war patrol ===
Sculpin's eighth war patrol, from 25 July–17 September, was off the Chinese coast, in the East China Sea and Formosa Strait. On 9 August, she torpedoed and sank Sekko Maru off the coast of Formosa. She evaded ASW patrol craft in the Taiwan Strait on 16–17 August. On 21 August, she intercepted an armed cargo ship and fired a spread of three torpedoes which ran "hot, straight, and normal" but did not explode. Sculpin was immediately pounced upon by escorting destroyers and was forced to dive. The cargo ship escaped in the ensuing depth charge attack. A similar torpedo malfunction occurred on 1 September, when the splash of water resulting from the torpedo striking the target's hull could be seen, but no detonation occurred. The submarine escaped the immediate counterattack of the escorts, and after reconnaissance of Marcus Island, she returned to Midway Atoll after 54 days on patrol, earning credit for one ship of 4,500 tons (reduced to 3,183 tons postwar).

=== Ninth war patrol and loss ===
Following a brief overhaul period at Pearl Harbor, Sculpin – commanded by Fred Connaway – departed Hawaii on 5 November 1943. Ordered to patrol north of Truk, she was to intercept and attack Japanese forces leaving Truk to oppose the forthcoming invasion of Tarawa in the Gilbert Islands. Sculpin and two other submarines were to form a wolf pack to make coordinated attacks on the enemy, with either Searaven or Apogon. Captain John P. Cromwell, who had been fully briefed on the Tarawa operation and was in the picture on ULTRA, was on board Sculpin to coordinate wolf pack operations.

After refueling at Johnston Island on 7 November, Sculpin proceeded to her assigned station. On 29 November, Captain Cromwell was ordered to activate the wolf pack. When the submarine failed to acknowledge, the message was repeated 48 hours later. The submarine was presumed lost on 30 December and stricken from the Naval Vessel Register on 25 March 1944.

The account of Sculpin's final patrol was given by the surviving members of her crew, who were liberated from Japanese prisoner of war camps after V-J Day. On 16 November, she had arrived on station and had made radar contact with a large, high-speed convoy on the night of 18 November. Making a fast end run on the surface to attack on the morning of 19 November, she was in firing position but was forced to dive when the convoy and its escorts zigged toward her. When the Japanese task force changed course, Sculpin surfaced to make another run, but was discovered by Yamagumo, which the convoy commander had left behind for just this eventuality, only 600 yards (550 m) away. Diving fast, the submarine escaped the first salvo of depth charges. A second string of "ash cans" knocked out her depth gauge and caused other minor damage. She evaded the destroyer in a rain squall and around 1200 attempted to come to periscope depth. The damaged depth gauge stuck at 125 feet (38 m), so the submarine broached and was again detected. She immediately submerged and the destroyer attacked with a pattern of 18 depth charges. There was considerable damage, including temporary loss of depth control. As a result, Sculpin ran beyond safe depth so that many leaks developed in the hull. So much water entered that the submarine was forced to run at high speed to maintain depth. This made tracking easy for the Japanese sonar. A second depth charge attack knocked out Sculpin's sonar.

The submarine's commanding officer, Commander Fred Connaway, decided to surface and give the crew of the doomed vessel a chance for survival. With her decks still awash, Sculpin's gunners manned the deck guns but were no match for the destroyer's main battery. A shell hit the conning tower and killed the bridge watch, including Connaway, and flying fragments killed the gun crew, including gunnery officer Lieutenant Joseph Defrees, the ship's sponsor's son. The ship's senior surviving officer, Lieutenant George E. Brown, ordered Sculpin abandoned and scuttled. Before he opened the vents, he informed Captain Cromwell. Fearing he might reveal the plans for the Tarawa invasion under the influence of torture or drugs, Cromwell refused to leave the stricken submarine, giving his life to escape capture. He was posthumously awarded the Medal of Honor for his act of heroism and devotion to country. Sculpin's diving officer, Ensign W. M. Fiedler (who failed to notice the depth gauge had stuck), along with ten others, some doubtless already dead, joined him.

Forty-two of Sculpin's crew were picked up by Yamagumo. One badly wounded sailor (William Henry Welsh) was thrown back in the sea because of his condition. The survivors were questioned for about ten days at the Japanese naval base at Truk, then were embarked on two aircraft carriers returning to Japan. Chūyō carried 21 of the survivors in her hold. On 4 December, the carrier was torpedoed and sunk by Sailfish and twenty of the American prisoners perished; one man, George Rocek, was saved when he was able to grab hold of a ladder on the side of a passing Japanese destroyer and hauled himself on board. (Ironically, Sailfish – at the time named Squalus – was the same submarine Sculpin had helped to locate and raise some four-and-a-half years before.) The other 21 survivors arrived at Ōfuna Camp, Japan, on 5 December and, after further questioning, were sent to the Ashio copper mines for the duration of the war.

== Awards ==
- Asiatic-Pacific Campaign Medal with eight battle stars for World War II service
- Philippine Presidential Unit Citation (Republic of the Philippines)

Sculpin ended World War II with a total of three confirmed ships sunk for 9,835 tons.

== In media ==
Sculpin is the subject of an episode of the syndicated television anthology series, The Silent Service, which aired during the 1957–1958 season.
