= Japanese aircraft carrier Kaiyō =

Escort carrier of the Imperial Japanese Navy

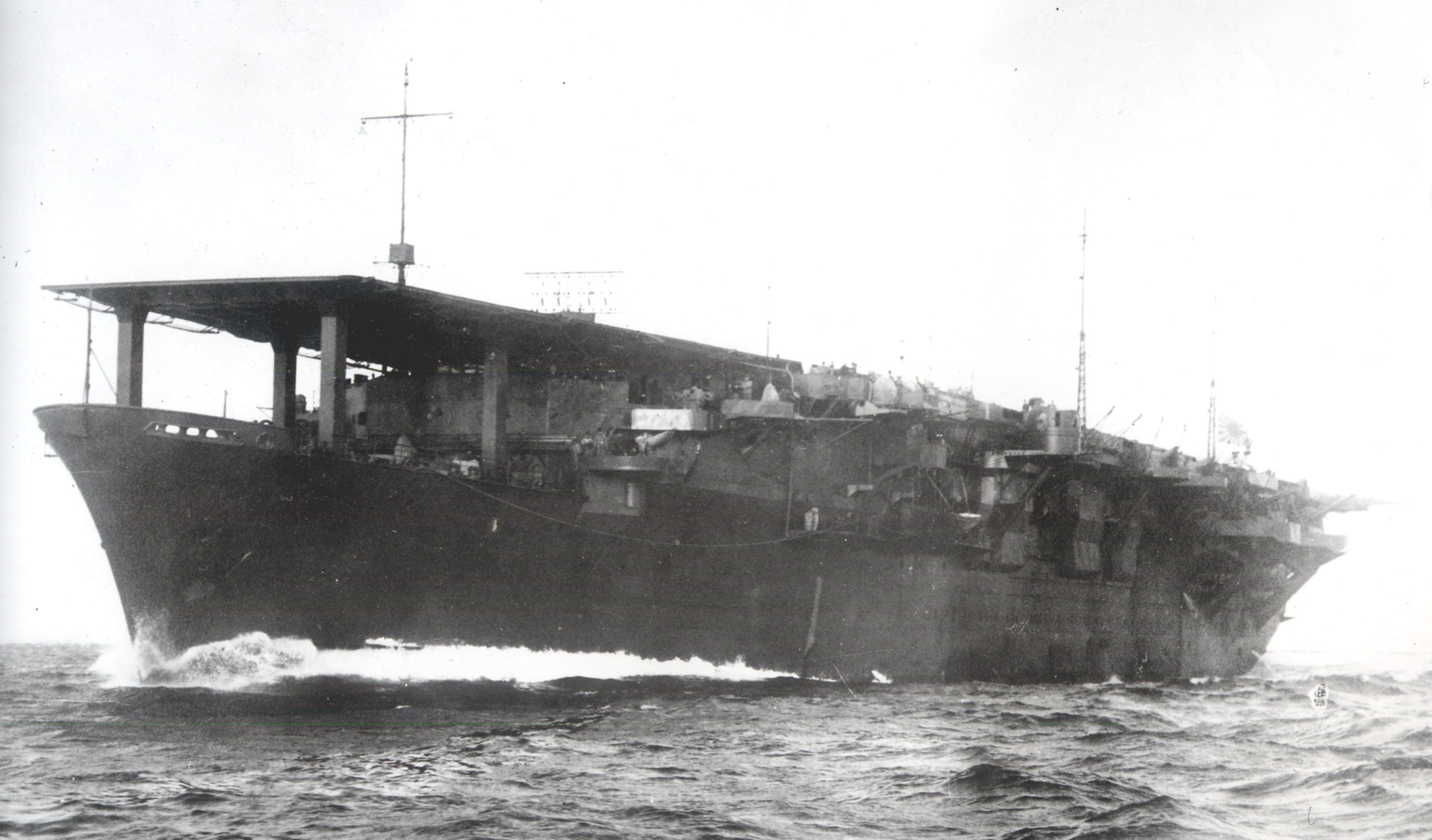
- Kaiyō at sea

History

Japan
- Name: MV Argentina Maru
- Owner: Osaka Shosen Kaisha
- Builder: Mitsubishi Heavy Industries Shipyard, Nagasaki
- Launched: 9 December 1938
- Completed: 31 May 1939
- Fate: Sold to the Imperial Japanese Navy, 9 December 1942

Empire of Japan
- Name: Kaiyō
- Namesake: Sea Hawk
- Acquired: 9 December 1942
- Commissioned: 23 November 1943
- Stricken: 20 November 1945
- Fate: Scrapped, 1 September 1946

General characteristics
- Type: Escort carrier
- Displacement: 13,600 t (13,400 long tons) (standard); 16,483 t (16,223 long tons) (loaded)
- Length: 166.55 m (546 ft 5 in)
- Beam: 21.9 m (71 ft 10 in)
- Draft: 8.04 m (26 ft 5 in)
- Installed power: 52,000 shp (39,000 kW); 4 × water-tube boilers
- Propulsion: 2 × shafts; 2 × Kampon geared steam turbines
- Speed: 23 kn (43 km/h; 26 mph)
- Range: 7,000 nmi (13,000 km; 8,100 mi)
- Complement: 829
- Sensors & processing systems: 1 × Type 2, Mark 2, Model 1 air search radar
- Armament: 4 × twin 12.7 cm/40 Type 89 dual-purpose guns; 8 × triple Type 96 25 mm (0.98 in) AA guns
- Aircraft carried: 24

Kaiyō (海鷹, Sea Hawk) was an escort carrier operated by the Imperial Japanese Navy (IJN) during World War II. The ship was originally built as the ocean liner Argentina Maru (あるぜんちな丸). She was purchased by the IJN on 9 December 1942, converted into an escort carrier, and renamed Kaiyō. The ship was primarily used as an aircraft transport, escort carrier and training ship during the war. She was badly damaged by repeated air attacks in July 1945 and was scrapped in 1946–48.

== Description ==
The ship was ordered as the fast luxury passenger liner Argentina Maru by Osaka Shosen Kaisha (OSK) in 1938. In exchange for a subsidy of her building costs by the Navy Ministry, she was designed to be converted to an aircraft carrier.

Argentina Maru was completed in 1939 and rated at 12,755 gross register tons (GRT). After being rebuilt, the ship had a length of 155 meters (508 ft 6 in) overall. She had a beam of 21.9 meters (71 ft 10 in) and a draft of 8.04 meters (26 ft 5 in). She displaced 13,600 tonnes (13,400 long tons) at standard load. As part of her conversion, her original diesel engines, which had given her a top speed of 21.5 knots (39.8 km/h; 24.7 mph), were replaced by a pair of destroyer-type geared steam turbine sets with a total of 52,000 shaft horsepower (39,000 kW), each driving one propeller. Steam was provided by four water-tube boilers and Kaiyō now had a maximum speed of 23 knots (43 km/h; 26 mph). She carried enough fuel oil to give her a radius of 7,000 nautical miles (13,000 km; 8,100 mi). Her crew numbered 829 officers and men.

The ship's flight deck was 21.9 meters (72 ft) wide and Kaiyō had a single hangar, served by two aircraft elevators, mounted on the centerline. She was not built with an island and could operate 24 aircraft. The ship's primary armament consisted of eight 40-caliber 12.7 cm Type 89 anti-aircraft (AA) guns in twin mounts on sponsons along the sides of the hull. They fired 23.45-kilogram (51.7 lb) projectiles at a rate between 8 and 14 rounds per minute at a muzzle velocity of 700–725 m/s (2,300–2,380 ft/s); at 45°, this provided a maximum range of 14,800 meters (16,200 yd), and a maximum ceiling of 9,400 meters (30,800 ft). Kaiyō was also initially equipped with eight triple 25 mm Type 96 light AA guns, also in sponsons along the sides of the hull. They fired .25-kilogram (0.55 lb) projectiles at a muzzle velocity of 900 m/s (3,000 ft/s); at 50°, this provided a maximum range of 7,500 meters (8,202 yd), and an effective ceiling of 5,500 meters (18,000 ft). The maximum effective rate of fire was only between 110 and 120 rounds per minute due to the frequent need to change the fifteen-round magazines. In early July 1944, 20 single 25 mm guns were added as were eight depth charges. Some sources say that a number of 28-round AA rocket launchers were added in late 1944. (Note: However, this is not confirmed by Stille, nor in Lengerer's article on the rocket launcher.) Each 12-centimeter (4.7 in) rocket weighed 22.5 kilograms (50 lb) and had a maximum velocity of 200 m/s (660 ft/s). Their maximum range was 4,800 meters (5,200 yd). Early warning was provided by a Type 2, Mark 2, Model 1 air search radar that was installed on the side of the flight deck in November 1943.

== Service history ==
Argentina Maru was initially used for troop transport after the beginning of the Pacific War in December 1941. The ship began conversion at Nagasaki on 10 December 1942, the day after she was purchased. After the conversion was completed on 23 November 1943, she was renamed Kaiyō. Her initial duties were to transport aircraft to Japanese overseas bases. Her first such task was to ferry aircraft for the 23rd Air Flotilla to Singapore via Manila in January 1944 as part of Convoy HI-33. On her return journey, the ship transported aircraft of the 551st Air Group to Truk. On 10 February, en route to Truk from Palau, the submarine Permit made a night attack on Kaiyō, but the torpedoes missed. Kaiyō was briefly refitted between 23 February and 2 March and was assigned to the 1st Surface Escort Division on 17 March. She escorted Convoy HI-57 to Singapore via Taiwan and Indochina in April. She escorted Convoy HI-58 on the return voyage; one of her aircraft spotted the submarine Robalo on the surface behind the convoy. The submarine was damaged by the escorts, but escaped.

In late May, Kaiyō formed part of the escort for Convoy HI-65, together with the escort carrier Shinyo, bound for Singapore. One of the escorts was torpedoed en route and two of the merchantmen collided while trying to dodge the other torpedoes. The rest of the convoy arrived at Singapore on 12 June. Kaiyō was assigned to fast Convoy HI-66 for the return voyage and reached Japan on 26 June. She was briefly docked at Kure Naval Arsenal in early July to have more 25 mm AA guns fitted. Together with the escort carrier Taiyō, Kaiyō was loaded with aircraft bound for the Philippines to be delivered in Convoy HI-69. They departed on 13 July and arrived a week later. The convoy left Manila four days later and reached Japan on 1 August. The ship's machinery broke down as she was preparing to join another convoy on 4 August and she was transferred to Sasebo.

On 25 October, Kaiyō ferried a dozen transport aircraft to Keelung, Taiwan, and arrived at Kure on 2 November. The ship was assigned to escort Convoy HI-83 to Singapore via Taiwan and Hainan Island on 25 November and arrived on 13 December. En route, she was assigned to the First Escort Fleet on 10 December. While returning to Japan with Convoy HI-84 later that month, Kaiyō was attacked and missed by the submarine Dace on 31 December. After arriving at Moji on 13 January 1945, the ship was transferred to Kure and assigned to pilot training in the Inland Sea.

On 19 March 1945, while moored at Kure, Kaiyō was attacked by an American carrier aircraft from Task Force 58. She was hit in the port engine room by a bomb that started fires and caused some flooding. The ship started to list and was moved into shallow water near Etajima Island lest she sink. On 20 April she was assigned to serve as a target ship for kamikaze crews. Kaiyō resumed her pilot training duties a month later and hit a mine on 18 July with only minor damage.

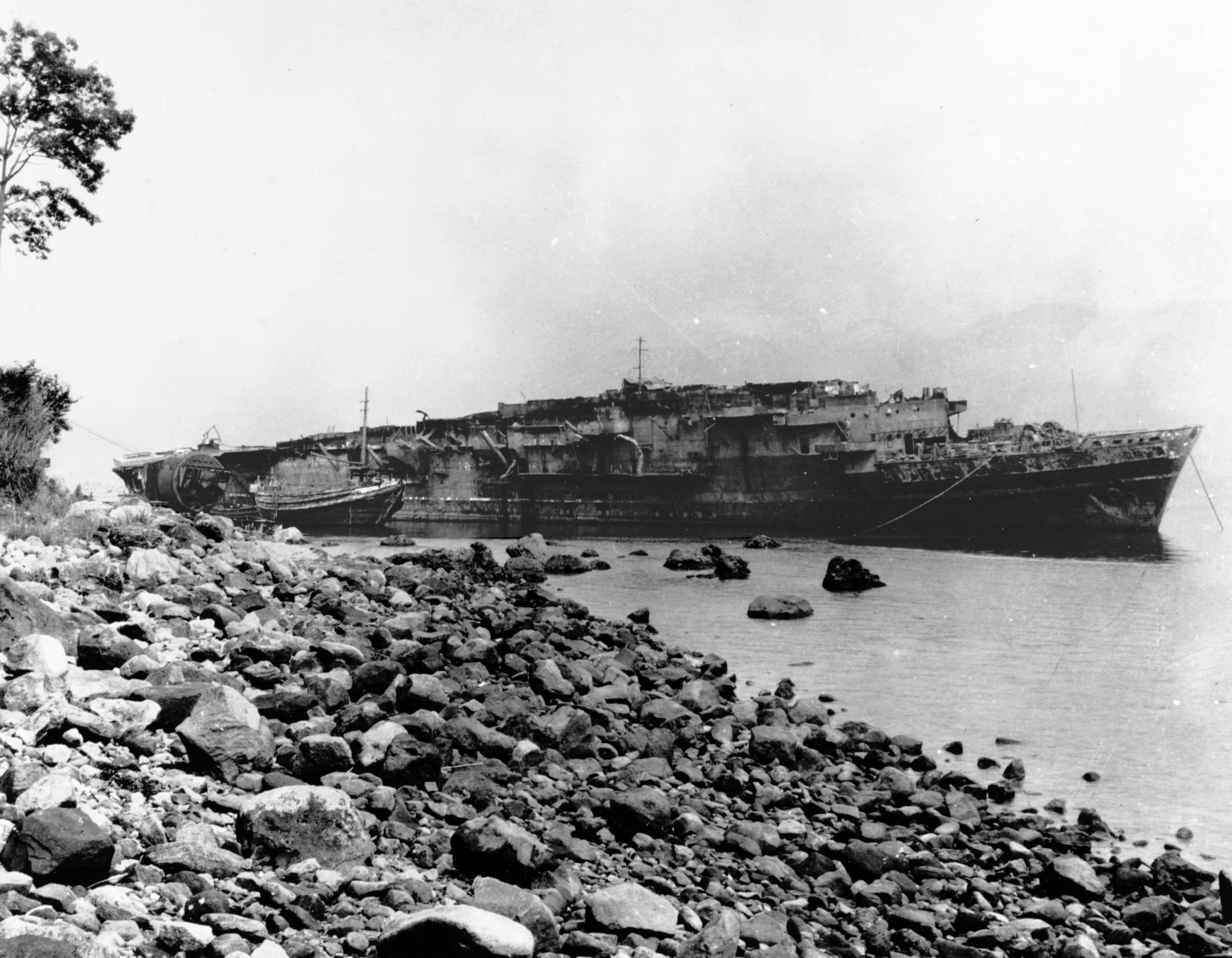
Kaiyō being scrapped in Beppu Bay, c. 1946–1947

Six days later, she was attacked as part of a renewed aerial campaign against remaining Japanese warships, and hits were attributed to Fleet Air Arm aircraft from the British Pacific Fleet. While attempting to avoid the attack, she also struck a mine. The ship was towed overnight to Beppu Bay and deliberately grounded the following morning to prevent her from sinking. The ship was attacked again on 28 July by American carrier aircraft that knocked out the ship's power and stopped her pumps. Kaiyō was also hit by 18 rockets and a total of 20 crewmen were killed by the attacks. The damage caused her to ground again with a list to port. The next day she was attacked again by B-25J Mitchell medium bombers of the Fifth Air Force as well as by aircraft from the carrier Ticonderoga. The amount of damage inflicted by these attacks, if any, is unknown, but they did cause Captain Shuichi Osuga to abandon attempts to repair the ship. He ordered that the boilers be flooded with sea water and the machinery coated in oil to better preserve it. Some crewmen were left aboard to man the AA guns.

Low-level air strikes by Okinawa-based B-25J Mitchells of the United States Army Air Forces 38th Bomb Group on 9 August further damaged the carrier, despite extensive use of camouflage netting and foliage. The following day, the ship's list increased and she was ordered abandoned. Kaiyō was struck from the Navy List on 20 November and scrapped in place from 1 September 1946 and 30 January 1948 by Nissan Salvage.
