= Aircraft carrier operations during World War II =

This article discusses aircraft carrier operations during World War II.

== Historical overview ==
Naval historians such as Evan Mawdsley, Richard Overy, and Craig Symonds concluded that World War II's decisive victories on land could not have been won without decisive victories at sea. Naval battles to keep shipping lanes open for combatants' movement of troops, guns, ammunition, tanks, warships, aircraft, raw materials, and food largely determined the outcome of land battles. Without the Allied victory in keeping shipping lanes open during the Battle of the Atlantic, Britain could not have fed her people or withstood Axis offensives in Europe and North Africa. Without Britain's survival and without Allied shipments of food and industrial equipment to the Soviet Union, (Note: Britain and America shipped war-sustaining goods to the Soviet Union via Arctic Ocean, Persian Gulf, and Pacific Ocean routes.) her military and economic power would likely not have rebounded in time for Soviet soldiers to prevail at Stalingrad and Kursk.

Without victories at sea in the Pacific theater, the Allies could not have mounted amphibious assaults on or maintained land forces on Guadalcanal, New Guinea, Saipan, The Philippines, Iwo Jima, or Okinawa. Allied operations in the Atlantic and Pacific theaters were interconnected because they frequently competed for scarce naval resources for everything from aircraft carriers to transports and landing craft. Effective transport of troops and military supplies between the two war theaters required naval protection for shipping routes around the Cape of Good Hope, through the Suez canal, and through the Panama Canal. In both theaters, maritime dominance enabled combatants to use the sea for their own purposes and deprive its use by adversaries. As naval historian Admiral Herbert Richmond stated, "Sea power did not win the war itself: it enabled the war to be won."

Aircraft carriers played a major role in winning decisive naval battles, supporting key amphibious landings, and keeping critical merchant shipping lanes open for transporting military personnel and their equipment to land battle zones.

== Ascendancy of aircraft carriers over battleships ==
It became apparent early in the war that control of the air was prerequisite for successful surface action both on land and at sea. (Note: The effectiveness of carrier-launched aircraft against warships was demonstrated at the Battle of Taranto, the Attack on Pearl Harbor, and the destruction of Force Z.) For much of the war, Britain and America fought mainly on the seas, where successful Allied naval operations permitted effective support and reinforcement of troops in North Africa, the Soviet Union, western Europe and the Pacific. These operations also crippled similar efforts by Italy and Japan to sustain the empires they built by conquest. By 1942, aircraft carriers with the striking power provided by hundreds of warplanes delivering bombs and torpedoes to targets hundreds of miles away supplanted battleships with big guns as the principal warships around which navies assembled task forces for major campaigns.

Only the United States, United Kingdom, and Japan made significant use of aircraft carriers during the war. (Note: As of 2020, only nine countries have ever constructed aircraft carriers. (See Pike, p. ?)) The following table shows the number of each type of carrier the principal combatants operated that had at least one flight deck, was capable of both launching and recovering aircraft at sea, and that was operational sometime between July 1937 and August 1945. The counts include carriers in service before the war began as well as those commissioned during the war.

Number of aircraft carriers operated and sunk in World War II, by carrier type
Country	Fleet	Light	Escort	MAC	Total
USA	24	9	78 (Note: Excludes thirty-eight CVEs constructed in the US and transferred to Britain. Includes USS Langley, the first US aircraft carrier, that was reclassified as a seaplane tender before World War II began. She was used during the early months of the war to conduct anti-submarine patrols and ferry aircraft, just as an escort carrier would do. Because she still had a flight deck and could still transport, launch, and retrieve aircraft, Langley is included here as an escort carrier rather than a seaplane tender. (See Naval History Blog))	0	111
Britain	12	8	44 (Note: Thirty-eight of these escort carriers were launched in the US and transferred to the UK under Lend-Lease.)	19	83
Japan	13 (Note: Includes as CVs both Hiyo and Junyo that are classified by some as CVEs. The displacements, length, speed, and number of aircraft for these carriers are intermediate between typical Japanese CVs and CVLs. Also, they were engaged in naval battles and supported invasions, unlike Japan's five CVEs, whose functions were limited to convoy escort, transportation, and training. After the losses at Midway, the IJN reorganized carriers into just two divisions, each consisting of two fleet carriers and one light carrier. Hiyo and Junyo were the fleet carriers for the IJN Second Carrier Division) (Note: The Nisshin and the Mizuho are not included in the counts for this table. They could carry twenty-four seaplanes but did not have flight decks. They used catapults to launch aircraft and cranes to bring them back aboard.) (Note: Ise and Hyūga are not included in the counts for this table. They were dreadnought class battleships rebuilt as hybrid aircraft carriers following Japanese fleet carrier losses during the Battle of Midway. Rear guns were removed to make room for catapults to launch seaplanes but there were no flight decks. Neither ship ultimately launched aircraft in combat during the war due to shortages of aircraft and pilots. Both were part of the Japanese decoy fleet during the Battle of Leyte Gulf.)	7	5	0	25
France	1	0	0	0	1 (Note: Includes only the Béarn. The Commandant Teste was initially a French seaplane carrier but later used as a training ship. She could carry twenty-six seaplanes but did not have a flight deck, instead launching planes by catapult and recovering them by crane. She was scuttled on 27 November 1942 to prevent her capture by the Germans.)
Total	50	24	127	19	220
Total sunk	19	7	15	0	41
Sunk percentage	38%	29%	12%	0%	19%

World War II fleet carriers typically displaced 20,000 to 35,000 tons and could sail at 30 to 35 knots. Japanese and American fleet carriers were typically capable of carrying 50 to 90 aircraft into combat. British carriers were designed with armored decks, a measure that provided significantly greater protection against bombs and kamikazes. The additional weight of the armor, however, reduced their typical carrying capability to 35 to 55 aircraft. Thus their additional defensive measures limited their offensive striking power until Britain introduced a new carrier class late in the war.

Light aircraft carriers were fast enough to keep up with the fleet carriers but their smaller size typically reduced their aircraft load to between 30 and 50. The design of those commissioned immediately after the war began typically reflected the immediate need for fast carriers and took advantage either of having other ship hulls available for conversion to aircraft carriers or the available capacity of commercial shipyards to build them. While these carriers made contributions to the war efforts, their relatively small size made them operationally inefficient. The measure of naval power in the Pacific Theater was the number of fleet carriers a navy had.

Escort carriers were smaller, slower, lightly armored, and carried 20 to 30 aircraft. They were not typically included with naval battle fleets, but before the war was over, escort carriers had performed every function that the larger carriers did.

Merchant aircraft carriers (MACs) transported grain and oil in the holds below the flight deck and carried 3 or 4 aircraft to protect themselves and other ships in convoys in which they traveled. None were used for offensive operations.

Land-based aircraft as well as carrier-launched aircraft fought at sea. In the Atlantic Theater, German and Italian aircraft attacked Allied convoys that were protected by fighter aircraft from Allied airfields as long as convoys were within fighter range. As carriers became available, Allied carrier-launched fighters provided protection in those ocean areas that could not be protected by land-based planes. In the Pacific Theater, Japan's successful expansion was typically achieved by progressively using land-based aircraft to support invasions of new areas that were within striking distance of airbases that they had established on previously conquered areas. For the Allies, land-based aircraft at local airfields contributed significantly to America's defense of Midway Island and Guadalcanal. Naval fighters and bombers that operated from land-based airfields were typically delivered to battle zones by aircraft carriers. In both theaters, carrier-launched aircraft played significant roles in dominating the air, and construction of aircraft carriers received priority.

At the same time that America, Britain, and Japan began emphasizing aircraft carrier construction, they de-emphasized construction of battleships. Before the war, the number of battleships a country operated was universally regarded as the principal indicator of naval power. The Japanese attack on Pearl Harbor sank or damaged eight (Note: Sunk or damaged battleships were Nevada, Oklahoma, Pennsylvania, Arizona, Tennessee, California, Maryland, and West Virginia.) of America's eighteen (Note: Sixteen American battleships were commissioned between 1912 and 1923 (Wyoming, Arkansas, New York, Texas, Nevada, Oklahoma, Pennsylvania, Arizona, New Mexico, Mississippi, Idaho, Tennessee, California, Colorado, Maryland, and West Virginia) and two were commissioned in 1941 (North Carolina, and Washington.)) battleships. The aircraft carriers were at sea and escaped destruction. Six of the eight were repaired and returned to service (Note: Arizona and Oklahoma were not returned to naval service.) and eight new battleships were commissioned during the rest of the war. (Note: Ten new USN carriers were commissioned during the war. South Dakota, Indiana, Massachusetts, Alabama, Iowa, New Jersey, Missouri, and Wisconsin were commissioned between 20 March 1942 and 16 April 1944. Carriers North Carolina and Washington were commissioned in 1941 before 7 December 1941.) During the period September 1939 to August 1945, America commissioned ten new battleships while Japan commissioned only two and converted two existing ones to hybrid aircraft carriers. Starting the war with 15 battleships and battlecruisers, the UK commissioned five King George V class battleships but the need for smaller vessels precluded building any more. Germany, Italy, and France together commissioned a total of six. All together, only 23 new battleships were added to combatants' fleets during the war years (Note: Between September 1939 and August 1945, 10 American (South Dakota, Indiana, Massachusetts, Alabama, Iowa, New Jersey, Missouri, Wisconsin, North Carolina and Washington), 5 British (Duke of York, King George V, Prince of Wales, Anson, Howe), 2 Japanese (Yamato, Musashi), 3 Italian (Vittorio Veneto, Littorio, Roma), 1 French (Richelieu), and 2 German battleships (Bismarck, Tirpitz) were commissioned. Construction of most of these had begun before the Japanese raid on Pearl Harbor.) compared to 55 new fleet and light carriers.

During the entire war, battleship guns sank only a single fleet carrier and a single battleship. (Note: Guns from Kriegsmarine battleships Scharnhorst and Gneisenau sank the carrier HMS Glorious 8 June 1940 in the North Sea; battleship USN Washington sank battleship IJN Kirishima during the Naval Battle of Guadalcanal 14 November 1942. USN cruiser gunfire may have contributed, along with bombing by carrier aircraft, to the sinking of IJN light carriers Chiyoda and Chitose 25–26 October 1944 during the Battle off Cape Engaño, part of the Battle of Layte Gulf.) In comparison, carrier-launched aircraft damaged, sank, or took part in sinking 19 battleships. (Note: Carrier launched aircraft sank or damaged 19 battleships during World War II. These included nine American battleships, including the USS Utah that was being used as a target ship, that were sunk or damaged during the Japanese raid on Pearl Harbor in 1941. All but USS Arizona and USS Oklahoma were salvaged and returned to service. Japanese battleships IJN Yamato, Musashi, Settsu (target ship), Ise, Hyuga, Hiei were damaged or sunk by American carrier aircraft, some with assistance by American submarines. KMS Bismarck was sunk by gunfire after being crippled by an aerial torpedo. KMS Tirpitz was damaged in repeated attacks British carrier aircraft and finally sunk in 1945 by British land based aircraft. Italian battleships RMS Conte di Cavour, Caio Dulio, and Littorio were sunk (then refloated) during the British raid on Taranto in 1940. An additional seven battleships were sunk by land based aircraft. HMS Prince of Wales and HMS Repulse were sunk by Japanese land based bombers in 1941. The German SMS Zahringen, in use as a target ship, was sunk by British land based bombers in 1944. RMS Roma was sunk by German land based aircraft in 1943. Greek ships Lemnos (formerly USS Idaho) and Kilkis (formally USS Mississippi) were sunk by German land based aircraft in 1941. The Russian battleship Petropavlovsk was sunk (later reflected) by German land based bombers in 1941.) Although Japan was first to recognize and exploit the greater effective striking power of aircraft carriers over battleships, she was slow to abandon employment of the latter. She commissioned battleships in 1941 and 1942 that were the largest and most heavily armed ever built. (Note: Japanese battleship Yamato and Japanese battleship Musashi, both with 18 inch guns.) After the losses at the Battle of Midway, however, Japan changed naval tactics and began leaving battleships out of major naval engagements. America began primary reliance upon its aircraft carriers for offensive operations early in the Pacific war out of necessity after the destruction of its Pacific battleship fleet during the Japanese raid on Pearl Harbor.

== Functions performed by aircraft carriers ==
Aircraft carriers were used for a wide variety of combat and combat support functions during the war. These included:

- Naval battles, during which carrier aircraft attacked each other and enemy warships, as they did during the Battle of Midway between American and Japanese fleets.
- Invasions, during which carrier aircraft provided support for amphibious landings and for occupying enemy-held positions by bombing those positions before, during, and after landings; spotting for warship guns, sometimes even controlling the firing; delivering replacement aircraft and aircrews to other carriers and to airfields after successful landings, as during the American invasion of Iwo Jima.
- Raids, during which carrier aircraft attacked enemy positions to degrade them but without the intention of landing and occupying those positions, as during the Japanese Attack on Pearl Harbor and raid on Ceylon.
- Anti-shipping missions, during which carrier aircraft blockaded enemy ports or attacked enemy shipping and shipping facilities, as during the Allied attacks around Bodø, Norway.
- Anti-raider missions, in which carrier aircraft searched for and attacked enemy surface ships engaged in raiding enemy merchant shipping, as during the British sinking of the Bismark.
- Anti-submarine missions, during which Hunter-killer Groups operating independently from convoys and their Escort Groups searched for and destroyed enemy submarines, during the Battle of the Atlantic.
- Convoy Escort, carrier aircraft searched for and attacked enemy aircraft and submarines that threatened a convoy's merchant ships.
- Transport, during which carriers delivered aircraft and aircrews to land bases or other carriers, as USS Long Island (CVE) did for Henderson Field on Guadalcanal and as the "CVE Plane Transport Unit" did during the invasion of Okinawa. (Note: Task Unit 50.8.4 composed of USN escort carriers Attu, Admiralty Islands, Bouginville, and Windham Bay transported replacement aircraft and pilots to the fleet carriers and to combat-focused escort carriers. (See Y'Blood, Little Giants p. 351)
- Training, during which carriers were dedicated to training pilots and/or conducting operating trials to improve carrier tactics and procedures. IJN Hōshō, HMS Furious, and USS Ranger spent long periods dedicated to training during the war.
- Repatriation, during which carriers, after the war, participated in returning military personnel to their home countries, as was done under America's Operation Magic Carpet.

The combatants differed in the functions they emphasized for carrier use, in part as a result of the challenges presented by their principal theater of operations. The table below indicates the percentage of carriers each combatant used for each function. For example, the US Navy operated a total of 33 fleet and light carriers during the war. Seventy-three per cent of these carriers participated in naval battles at one time or another. Eighty-five per cent were involved in support of invasions, etc. Escort carriers, although initially envisioned by many to perform only in support roles, ultimately performed all of the functions that the fleet and light carriers did.

Percentage of Aircraft Carriers Performing Functions
	Carriers	Naval Battles	Invasions	Raids	Anti-Ship.	Anti-Raid.	Anti-Sub.	Convoy Escort	Trans.	Training	Repat.
CV & CVL
USN	33	73%	85%	82%	9%	0%	3%	15%	15%	3%	45%
RN	20	20%	45%	55%	45%	35%	30%	50%	45%	15%	20%
IJN	20	75%	50%	30%	0%	0%	0%	5%	35%	10%	10%
CVE
USN	78	23%	53%	10%	6%	0%	24%	23%	82%	34%	49%
RN	44	0%	27%	27%	18%	0%	30%	61%	82%	18%	23%
IJN	5	0%	0%	0%	0%	0%	0%	80%	100%	60%	0%

== Aircraft carrier contribution to Allied victory ==
Historian Craig Symonds lists three key factors enabling the Allies to win the war: British "grit", Russian manpower, and American industrial strength. Specifically, the British Empire and Dominions continued for a year after the fall of France, stubbornly and successfully resisting the Axis. Thirty-five million Soviet Union soldiers fought during the war, as many as the United States, Germany, and Japan combined. The Soviet Union lost an estimated ten million soldiers to combat deaths, many more than any other combatant. America produced more artillery pieces, tanks, ships, and aircraft than all Axis countries combined, (Note: Only the Soviet Union produced more tanks and artillery pieces than the United States. Convoys to the Soviet Union protected in part by aircraft carriers provided a significant portion of the industrial equipment to manufacture those tanks and artillery pieces and provided food to sustain Soviet factory workers.) including over 70% of the aircraft carriers commissioned during the war.

Production of aircraft carriers, September 1939 – August 1945
Carrier Type:	Fleet	Light	Escort	MAC	Total
USA	19	9	115	0	143
UK	6	7	6	19	38
Japan	9	5	5	0	19
Total	34	21	126	19	200

Historian Richard Overy points out that statistics demonstrating material superiority are not by themselves sufficient for explaining why the Allies won the war. Less easily quantifiable factors also played a significant part. The political will to fight and willingness of individual combatants to sacrifice was present within both the Allies and Axis. However, the timing of mobilizing manufacturing, technological, and manpower responses was also very important. America and Russia mobilized men and industrial capacity to rebound from significant military setbacks more quickly than anticipated by the attacking Axis powers. Important technological advances achieved by the Allies during the war outpaced those of the Axis powers in both offensive and defensive weapons systems. The Allies had greater and more strategically significant successes with code-breaking. The Allies placed greater emphasis than Axis powers on logistical support for men fighting on the front, enabling them to fight more efficiently and effectively. Geographical configurations, namely the English Channel, Atlantic Ocean, and Pacific Ocean, helped isolate British and American home bases from attack. Significant strategic offensive decisions by Axis leaders proved unsound, creating opportunities that the Allies exploited to great effect. (Note: Examples include Germany's shifting priorities during its Russian offenses of 1941 and 1942 and Japan's uncoordinated priorities leading to the attack on Midway Island in 1942.) Finally, luck played an important part in some decisive battles. Many of these factors played important parts in enabling the Allies to dominate the seas, a central reason, according to historian Evan Mawdsley, for their emerging victorious in the war. Nonetheless, while statistics relating to industrial capacity to produce arms and planes and ships do not tell the whole story, they remain an important part of it.

Successful Allied initiatives at El Alamein, Stalingrad, French North Africa, and Guadalcanal in November 1942 marked strategic shifts for World War II. Aircraft carriers contributed to the success of these operations by protecting convoys of armaments and other supplies to Egypt and Russia, keeping Malta supplied and able to disrupt Axis supply operations to North Africa, providing air support for troops during the invasion of North Africa, and by helping prevent Japanese troops and supplies from reaching Guadalcanal. Beginning in 1943, the extensive mobilization of American production capability for war resulted in dramatic increases in the number of carriers available for even more strategic initiatives. Overall, aircraft carriers contributed greatly to making 1942 the pivotal, turning point of the war, 1944 the decisive year, and 1945 one for essentially finishing up, albeit at great cost.

In the Atlantic Theater, successful transportation of troops, aircraft, tanks, oil, and food from or routed through North America or up the West African coast to Britain, Russia, North Africa, and continental Europe was essential for ultimate Allied victory. Allied aircraft carriers screened by corvettes, destroyers and destroyer escorts proved more successful and cost-effective than battleships or cruisers for protecting convoys from attacks by Axis submarines, raiders, and land-based aircraft. By mid-1943, the Axis threat of cutting essential Allied supply lines had passed. By this time, however, six British carriers had been sunk. (Note: the fleet carriers HMS Courageous, Eagle, Ark Royal (both in Malta convoy operations), and the escort carriers HMS Audacity and Avenger by submarines. The lightly escorted Glorious was sunk by German battleships during evacuation of aircraft at the end of the Norwegian campaign in mid 1940)

In the Pacific Theater, a force of six Japanese fleet carriers with their combined aircraft striking power, the Kidō Butai, acted as a unit and roamed virtually at will for the first six months of the war. It made destructive raids against enemy positions from Hawaii in the east to India in the west and effectively supported Japanese invasions of the American Philippines, British Malaya and Burma, and the Dutch East Indies. Between May and October 1942, however, Japan and America fought four major battles between fleets centered around their aircraft carriers. During these battles, opposing warships never came within sight of each other nor fired their guns at other warships. Aircraft alone did the attacking. The first of these battles thwarted the Japanese attempt in the Coral Sea to isolate Australia. The second halted the expansion of Japanese control eastward in the Pacific toward Midway Island. The next two helped sustain the American presence on Guadalcanal. These four engagements (Note: The four carrier battles fought between American and Japanese fleets in 1942 were the Battle of the Coral Sea, the Battle of Midway, the Battle of the Eastern Solomons, and the Battle of the Santa Cruz Islands.) were costly for both sides. At the time Pearl Harbor was attacked, Japan had a total of nine fleet and light carriers in the Pacific Theater. America had four in the Pacific with another two far away in the Atlantic. At the end of October 1942, after battle attrition from sinkings and damages, Japan had only three such carriers operational in the Pacific Theater and America, for a two-week period, had none. Though costly, the battles were strategically advantageous for the Americans, contributing significantly to the shift of strategic initiative in the Pacific Theater from Japan to America.

America was better able make good on their losses from these battles. From October 1942 until the end of the Pacific war, America commissioned 26 new fleet and light carriers. Japan commissioned eight. Over the entire war, the Allies commissioned a total of 181 carriers of all types compared to Japan's total of 19.

Aircraft carriers (CVs, CVLs, CVEs, MACs) operated during World War II
	At September 1939	Comm. 1939-41	Sunk 1939-41	At December 1941 (Note: Includes SPT USS Langley, CVE USS Long Island, CVE HMS Audacity, CVE HMS Archer, and CVE IJN Taiyo.)	Comm. 1942-45	Sunk 1942-45	Retired 1942-45	At September 1945	Total Comm.	Total Sunk
USN	6 (Note: Includes SPT USS Langley.)	+3	-0	9	+102	-12	-0	99	+105	-12
RN	7	+6	-3	10	+70	-5	-7 (Note: Archer became a merchant ferry ship, Biter was retired, and Thane, after being hit by a torpedo, was written off as a total loss. Four Merchant Aircraft Carriers (Rapana, Amastra, Ancylus, and Acavus) were converted back to merchant ships.)	68	+76	-8
Allies	13 (Note: Excludes the French carrier Bearne.)	+9	-3	19	+172	-17	-7	167	+181	-20
IJN	6	+3	-0	9 (Note: Excludes IJN Shōhō, commissioned 30 Nov 1941 and assigned to the Fourth Carrier Division of the 1st Air Fleet 22 December 1941. Its air group began training 4 January 1942. (See Kido Butai at combinedfleet.com))	+16	-21	-0	4 (Note: Includes Hosho (CVL) in use after October 1942 only for training. Also includes Junyo (CVL), Ryuho (CVL), and Katsuragi (CV), all of which at war's end were damaged and/or stripped of aircraft and air crews, stationary, and camouflaged in Japanese ports and in use principally as anti-aircraft platforms. Such carriers are not included as operational in the counts for the table, "Number Of Aircraft Carriers In Service At The End Of Each Month".)	+19	-21
Total	19	+12	-3	28	+188	-38	-7	171	+200	-41

== Number of operational aircraft carriers ==
The number of aircraft carriers operational for combat missions at any time was typically less than the total number of carriers afloat. For example, at the end of October 1942 following the Battle of the Santa Cruz Islands, only seven (47%) of the fifteen fleet and light carriers the combatants had afloat worldwide were operational. Japan had six such carriers afloat but only three were operational. (Note: Hosho, Zuikaku, and Junyo were operational (Hosho only as a training ship) while Zuiho, Shokaku, and Hiyo were undergoing repair for combat damage. (See Tully, www.combinedfleet.com)) America had three afloat, but one was in the Atlantic and the other two were damaged, leaving no operational carriers in the Pacific. (Note: Ranger was in the Atlantic, Saratoga was at Pearl Harbor undergoing repair for submarine torpedo damage, and Enterprise was in Noumea, New Caledonia, undergoing repair for extensive bomb damage sustained at the Battle of Santa Cruz Island. (See www.hazegray.org)) Britain had six afloat, all in the Atlantic, but only three were operational. (Note: Furious, Argus, and Formidable were operational. Illustrious was being refitted at Durban in South Africa, Victorious was being refitted in Britain, and Indomitable was undergoing repair in America for bomb damage sustained in the Mediterranean.) In the Pacific for a short period, there were no Allied carriers that could oppose Japan's three operational carriers.

Losses of fleet and light aircraft carriers, 31 August 1939 – 31 October 1942
	UK	USA (Note: The USA and Japan did not begin hostilities until 7 December 1941)	Japan	Total
Total Afloat, 31 August 1939	7	5	6	18
Commissioned	+4	+2	+6	+12
Sunk	-5	-4	-6	-15
Total afloat, as of 31 October 1942	6	3	6	15
Non-operational, 31 October 1942	-3	-2	-3	-8
Operational worldwide, as of 31 October 1942	3	1	3	7
Operational Atlantic, 31 October 1942	-3	-1	0	-4
Operational Pacific, 31 October 1942	0	0	3	3

As the war progressed, the relative number of operational carriers available for combat by each side depended upon 1)construction rates for new carriers, 2)losses due to sinkings, 3)how quickly carriers damaged in combat could be brought back into service, and 4)the time required for routine overhauls, refits for carriers to perform specific functions, and upgrades for older carriers. Short-term naval capabilities, plans, and outcomes were determined by the number of carriers that were operational during any given month. The impact of the relative number of operational, combat-ready carriers available was particularly felt during 1942, when the strategic initiative in the Pacific Theater passed from Japan to America.

=== Carrier construction and commissioning ===
Prior to 1936, international naval arms limitation treaties negotiated in Washington in 1922 and London in 1930 had required that the total number of Japanese capital ships (battleships, battle cruisers, aircraft carriers) be less than the number operated by either America or Britain. The agreed upon ratio was 5:5:3 for Britain, America, and Japan respectively. Dissatisfied with these limitations, Japan discontinued participation in naval treaty negotiations in 1936 and invested in a construction program that within five years doubled the number of her fleet and light carriers. At the time of Japan's raid on Pearl Harbor and her invasion of British Malaya, Japan had almost as many such carriers afloat as Britain and America combined. Moreover, since the western Allies deployed half of their carriers in the Atlantic and Mediterranean to oppose Germany and Italy, Japan had almost twice the Allies' number of carriers in the Pacific Theater (including the Indian Ocean) when she initiated hostilities.

Beginning in December 1942, the effects of America's industrial strength became evident as she began commissioning either a fleet carrier or a light carrier almost every month for the next two years. From November 1942, after the losses that year from four carrier battles, until the end of the war, America commissioned 26 new such carriers compared to 8 for Japan and 9 for Britain.

Commissioning of aircraft carriers, March 1918 – August 1945
Period	March 1918 to August 1939	September 1939 to November 1941	December 1941 to October 1942	November 1942 September 1945	March 1918 to September 1945
Fleet carriers
USA	5	2	0	17	24
UK	6	4	0	2	12
Japan	4	2	2	5	13
Total	15	8	2	24	49
Light carriers
USA	0	0	0	9	9
UK	1	0	0	7	8
Japan	2	2	0	3	7
Total	3	2	0	19	24
Fleet and light ("Fast") carriers
USA	5	2	0	26	33
UK	7	4	0	9	20
Japan	6	4	2	8	20
Total	18	10	2	43	73
Escort carriers
USA	1	1	9	67	78
Britain	0	2	5	37	44
Japan	0	1	1	3	5
Total	1	4	15	107	127
Merchant aircraft carriers
UK	0	0	0	19	19
All carriers
USA	6	3	9	93	111
UK	7	6	5	65	83
Japan	6	5	3	11	25
Total	19	14	17	169	219

=== Sea trials, delivery time, refitting ===
The time from building to entering operational service included sea trials to test the ship's systems and to train personnel. Only then did carriers move to intended war zones. Construction of HMS Victorious began in 1937 but she did not become combat operational until mid-1941 when rushed into the hunt for the German battleship Bismarck with only a quarter of her aircraft onboard . The USS Essex began in April 1941 and she was operational in mid-1943, in a raid on Rabaul eight months after commissioning.

The elapsed time between commissioning and combat action could also be short or long for escort carriers. Santee (CVE), a converted oil tanker rushed into service, still had workmen aboard during her shakedown cruise. Within seven weeks of commissioning, her aircraft were bombing airfields, spotting for warship's guns, patrolling for enemy cruisers and submarines, and refueling other ships in support of the invasion of North Africa. On the other hand, HMS Empress (D42) (an escort carrier) built in the US, experienced one of the longest periods between commissioning and combat action. She was built at Seattle on the US West Coast and then transferred to a Royal Canadian Dockyard Vancounver where she was commissioned in August 1943. She remained there until February 1944 undergoing modifications to meet Britain's requirements for deployment to defend convoys. She then sailed via the Panama Canal to the Atlantic and participated in exercises with other escort carriers in the Caribbean before heading north to Norfolk. Aircraft were embarked for transport to Britain, where Empress arrived in April. There, through November, she underwent repairs for defects and modifications considered necessary based upon experience with other operational escort carriers. Further preparations took place in December. In January 1945, still without aircrew aboard, she sailed for the Indian Ocean, where she took on an air squadron and participated in reconnaissance flights in February about 18 months after initial commissioning.

Escort carriers constructed in American shipyards and transferred to Britain spent more time being delivered because of the distance from America's west coast and Britain. In addition, modifications made in some cases because of concerns over onboard safety increased the elapsed time between CVE's commissioning and becoming operational. Britain made major changes to many American-made escort carriers due to concerns over fuel handling facilities after the unexplained explosion and sinking of HMS Dasher (D37) in March 1943. In addition, some elapsed time was due to modifications to make some carriers suitable for specific combat functions. As lessons were learned during combat, carriers were refitted to change armament or otherwise reconfigure systems. Such modifications removed carriers from combat availability during these modifications.

=== Combat damage ===
Damage to carriers due to weapons systems, collisions, weather, and other causes also reduced the number of carriers available for operations at any given time. Not every incident resulted in significant loss of combat effectiveness or retirement from combat. However, there were at least 229 incidents for which damage was sustained by carriers from enemy weapon systems or causes such as extreme weather (storms, typhoons), collisions, aircraft landing accidents, etc. that resulted in lost operational time. Forty-one of these damage incidents resulted in a carrier sinking. Fourteen incidents of damage involved more than one cause such as a carrier being damaged by both bombs and aerial torpedoes during a single attack. Taking such multiple causes for the 229 "damage incidents" into account, the number of "damage involvements" due to the various causes totaled 243. Consequently, the total for percentages of damage involvements may equal more than 100% of damage incidents. The percentages shown in the tables below indicate the frequency that a given cause was involved in the 229 incidents of damage/sinkings.

Enemy bombs were the leading cause of lost operational time for aircraft carriers during the war. They were involved in 25% of the 229 damage incidents. In addition, bombs were involved in sinking 44% of carriers sunk. The second largest cause for carriers' lost operational time was attacks by Japan's Special Attack Units, i.e., suicide planes that became known as kamikazes. Although introduced only in the last year of the war, kamikazes were involved in 19% of the total damage incidents. They were less effective for inflicting sufficient damage to sink carriers, however, and were involved in only 7% of carrier sinkings. Torpedoes launched by submarines and by aircraft were both involved in sinking more carriers than kamikazes, even during the final year of the war after kamikazes had been introduced. Torpedoes were also more efficient in sinking carriers as indicated by the higher percentage of damage involvements that resulted in sinking (59% when submarine-launched and 64% when aircraft-launched). The percentage of damage involvements resulting in sinkings also indicates that surface weapons were more efficient in sinking carriers than aerial-delivered weapons even though aerial weapons resulted in more carriers sunk. Causes other than weapon systems were responsible for 39% of lost time incidents, but accounted for only one carrier sank, an escort carrier.

Causes Of Lost-Operational Time For Aircraft Carriers
Causes For Damage	Carrier Lost-Time Involvements	Carriers Sunk	Per cent of Lost-Time Incidents	Per cent Of Carriers Sunk	Percentage of Sinkings To Incidents
Bombs	58	18	25%	44%	31%
Kamikazes	44	3	19%	7%	7%
Storms & Typhoons	30		13%		0%
Submarine Torpedoes	29	17	13%	41%	59%
Collisions	29		13%		0%
Aircraft Accidents	15		7%		0%
Aerial Torpedoes	14	9	6%	22%	64%
Warship Gunfire	6	3	3%	7%	50%
Mines	3		1%		0%
All Other Causes	15	1	7%	2%	7%
Total Lost-Time Involvements	243	51	106%	124%	21%
Recap:					
Aerial Weapons	116	30	51%	73%	26%
Surface Weapons	38	20	17%	49%	53%
Other Causes	89	1	39%	2%	1%
Total Lost-Time Involvements	243	51	106%	124%	21%
Incidents Involving Multiple Causes	-14	-10	-6%	-24%	
Total Lost-Time Incidents	229	41	100%	100%	18%

Notes: A very high percentage of IJN lost-time incidents included above involved damage by weapon systems and may reflect under-reporting of damage to IJN carriers from other causes. "Other causes" include storms & typhoons, collisions, aircraft accidents during carrier launchings and landings, mechanical failures, groundings, friendly fire, nearby explosions, and accidents during ship-to-ship refueling.

Source: World War II Database

=== Carrier losses ===
In the early years of the war, the combatants risked and lost a high percentage of their carriers. By October 1942, after the carrier battles for the year, America, Britain, and Japan had, in both theaters, lost a combined total of 15 fleet and light carriers. With new commissionings, they then had 15 such carriers afloat compared with the 18 they had in August 1939 at the opening of the European war and 24 in December 1941 when Pearl Harbor was attacked. The following table shows the number of such carriers sunk each year of the war. The total number of escort carriers (CVE) sunk during the war is also shown.

Number of aircraft carriers sunk during World War II
Year	America	Britain	Japan	Total
1939	0	1	0	1
1940	0	1	0	1
1941	0	1	0	1
1942	4	2	6	12
1943	0	0	0	0
1944	1	0	9	10
1945	0	0	1	1
1939–1945 CV & CVL	5	5	16	26
1939–1945 CVE	7	3	5	15
1939–1945 CV, CVL, & CVE	12	8	21	41

Source: World War II Database Information for each carrier is available at Lists of aircraft carriers operational during World War II.

=== Percentage of time operational ===
Taking into account all the factors that kept aircraft carriers out of combat after commissioning, carriers were typically operational 80% to 90% of the time. They were typically out of service 5% to 15% for combat-related damage repair and 5% to 10% for delivery and refitting to otherwise improve performance. Royal Navy escort carriers were typically out of service for refitting more than other carriers.

Fleet & Light Carriers	In service	Damage Repair	Refitting	Total
RN Fleet & Light Carriers	79%	10%	11%	100%
USN Fleet & Light Carriers	82%	12%	6%	100%
IJN Fleet & Light Carriers	82%	15%	4%	100%
Escort Carriers				
RN Escort Carriers	72%	5%	23%	100%
USN Escort Carriers	90%	5%	5%	100%
IJN Escort Carriers	82%	12%	6%	100%

Source: World War II Database Detailed information for each carrier is available for US, UK, and Japanese carriers.

=== Carriers operational at the end of each month ===
The number of operational carriers available to the combatants at any point in time affected the capability, plans, and outcomes of military operations in both the Atlantic and Pacific theaters throughout the war. Taking into consideration the time for construction, shakedown trials, delivery, refitting, combat damage, and sinkings, the table below shows the number of fleet and light carriers that were operational for each combatant in each combat theater at the end of each month. The Pacific Theater includes the Indian Ocean and the Atlantic Theater includes the Mediterranean Sea.

The table capsulizes the course of the war for aircraft carrier operations. It reflects how Japan more than doubled the number of her carriers between leaving the Washington/London naval treaties in 1936 and the time she attacked Pearl Harbor in December 1941. It also reflects the attrition for carriers during the formative year of 1942. It reflects the industrial capacity of the United States, illustrating how she could make good her losses of 1942 while Japan could not. Finally, it reflects the shift of British carriers to the Pacific after the Allies prevailed in battles for Atlantic waters. Note also that, after the two carrier battles off Guadalcanal in 1942, the percentage of aircraft carriers afloat that were in fact available for combat operations was typically less than 70%. During the Guadalcanal campaign in 1942, that percentage fell below 50%. From then until mid-1944, Japan did not engage her carriers in a major operation. When at last she did, the rest of her carriers were sunk or damaged.

Number of aircraft carriers afloat and operational at the end of each month:
Country:	USA	UK	Japan	USA	UK	Total	Total	To Total
Theater:	Pacific	Pacific	Pacific	Atlantic	Atlantic	Pac&Atl	Pac&Atl	Oper.
Status:	Oper.	Oper.	Oper.	Oper.	Oper.	Oper.	Afloat	Per cent
Aug 1939	4	1	6	1	6	18	18	100%
Dec 1939	4	2	6	1	4	17	17	100%
June 1940	4	0	6	2	4	16	18	89%
Dec 1940	4	0	7	2	7	20	20	100%
June 1941	3	0	7	3	5	18	21	86%
Dec 1941	4	1	9	2	3	19	25	76%
May 1942	4	3	9	2	3	21	23	91%
June 1942	4	2	6	1	3	16	18	89%
July 1942	4	2	4	1	5	16	19	84%
Aug 1942	2	1	5	1	3	12	17	71%
Sept 1942	1	1	5	1	3	11	16	69%
Oct 1942	0	0	3	1	3	7	15	47%
Nov 1942	1	0	3	1	4	9	16	56%
Dec 1942	2	1	4	1	4	12	17	71%
June 1943	3	1	6	1	5	16	26	62%
Dec 1943	9	0	6	1	3	19	34	56%
June 1944	17	4	4	1	3	29	38	76%
Dec 1944	16	5	2	0	2	25	40	63%
June 1945	17	5	0	0	5	27	47	57%
Aug 1945	23	9	0 (Note: Excludes Hosho (CVL), Junyo (CVL), Ryuho (CVL), and Katsuragi (CV), all of which were "afloat" at the end of the war but not "operational" as aircraft carriers. They were damaged, stripped of aircraft and air crews, stationary, and camouflaged in Japanese ports in use principally as anti-aircraft platforms.)	0	3	35	47	74%

== Atlantic theater ==
.

The US defined the Atlantic theater as including the North Atlantic, South Atlantic, and Arctic Oceans along with the Mediterranean and Caribbean Seas and the Gulf of Mexico.

The UK defined the Mediterranean as a separate theatre together with North Africa and Middle East.

For convoy defence against enemy submarines, escort carriers came into service in numbers in 1942.

== Pacific theater ==
The US Pacific theater included the Pacific and Indian oceans along with adjacent sea areas such as the South China Sea, East China Sea, and the Sea of Japan.

== Carrier aircraft used during World War II ==
Over 700 different aircraft models were used during World War II. At least 135 of these models were developed for naval use, including about 50 fighters and 38 bombers.

Only about 25 carrier-launched aircraft models were used extensively for combat operations. Of these, nine were introduced during the war years after the Japanese attack on Pearl Harbor brought United States into the war, four by the United States Navy (USN) and three by the Royal Navy (RN) and two by the Imperial Japanese Navy (IJN).

== Lists of aircraft carriers operational ==
Lists of aircraft carriers by carrier type for each country may be found at Lists of aircraft carriers operational during World War II.

== Aircraft carrier operations ==
Naval historians such as Evan Mawdsley, Richard Overy, and Craig Symonds concluded that World War II's decisive victories on land could not have been won without decisive victories at sea. Naval battles to keep shipping lanes open for combatant's movement of troops, guns, ammunition, tanks, warships, aircraft, raw materials, and food largely determined the outcome of land battles. Without the Allied victory in keeping shipping lanes open during the Battle of the Atlantic, Britain could not have fed her people or withstood Axis offensives in Europe and North Africa. Without Britain's survival and without Allied shipments of food and industrial equipment to the Soviet Union, her military and economic power would likely not have rebounded in time for Russian soldiers to prevail at Stalingrad and Kursk.

Without victories at sea in the Pacific theater, the Allies could not have mounted amphibious assaults on or maintained land forces on Guadalcanal, New Guinea, Saipan, The Philippines, Iwo Jima, or Okinawa. Allied operations in the Atlantic and Pacific war theaters were interconnected because they frequently competed for scarce naval resources for everything from aircraft carriers to transports and landing craft. Effective transport of troops and military supplies between the two war theaters required naval protection for shipping routes around the Cape of Good Hope, through the Suez canal, and through the Panama Canal. In both theaters, maritime dominance enabled combatants to use the sea for their own purposes and deprive its use by adversaries. As naval historian Admiral Herbert Richmond stated, "Sea power did not win the war itself: it enabled the war to be won".

Aircraft carriers played a major role in winning decisive naval battles, supporting key amphibious landings, and keeping critical merchant shipping lanes open for transporting military personnel and their equipment to land battle zones. This article is part of a series that covers World War II from the vantage point of aircraft carrier operations and is focused upon names and dates for operations involving aircraft carriers.

== Design and capability of aircraft carriers ==
Naval historians such as Evan Mawdsley, Richard Overy, and Craig Symonds concluded that World War II's decisive victories on land could not have been won without decisive victories at sea. Naval battles to keep shipping lanes open for combatant's movement of troops, guns, ammunition, tanks, warships, aircraft, raw materials, and food largely determined the outcome of land battles. Without the Allied victory in keeping shipping lanes open during the Battle of the Atlantic, Britain could not have fed her people or withstood Axis offensives in Europe and North Africa. Without Britain's survival and without Allied shipments of materiel, food and industrial equipment to the Soviet Union, her military and economic power would likely not have rebounded in time for the Red Army to prevail at Stalingrad and Kursk.

Without victories at sea in the Pacific theater, the Allies could not have mounted amphibious assaults on or maintained land forces on Guadalcanal, New Guinea, Saipan, The Philippines, Iwo Jima, or Okinawa. Allied operations in the Atlantic and Pacific war theaters were interconnected because they frequently competed for scarce naval resources for everything from aircraft carriers to transports and landing craft. Effective transport of troops and military supplies between the two war theaters required naval protection for shipping routes around the Cape of Good Hope, through the Suez canal, and through the Panama Canal. In both theaters, maritime dominance enabled combatants to use the sea for their own purposes and deprive its use by adversaries. As naval historian Admiral Herbert Richmond stated, "Sea power did not win the war itself: it enabled the war to be won".

Aircraft carriers played a major role in winning decisive naval battles, supporting key amphibious landings, and keeping critical merchant shipping lanes open for transporting military personnel and their equipment to land battle zones.

== See also ==
- Atlantic Theater aircraft carrier operations during World War II
- Pacific Theater aircraft carrier operations during World War II
- Carrier aircraft used during World War II
- Design and capability of aircraft carriers during World War II
- Lists of aircraft carriers operational during World War II
- Lists of aircraft carrier operations during World War II
- Allied submarines in the Pacific War

== Principal sources ==
- Celander, Lars (2018). How Carriers Fought- Carrier Operations in World War II. USA & Great Britain: Casemate Publishers.
- Dull, Paul S. (1978). A Battle History of the Imperial Japanese Navy (1941–1945). Annapolis, Maryland: United States Naval Institute.
- Frank, Richard (1990). GuadalCanal- The Definitive Account of the Landmark Battle. New York, New York: Penguin Books.
- Hata, Ikuhiko; Izawa, Yashuho; Shores, Christopher (2011). Japanese Naval Air Force Fighter Units And Their Aces 1932-1945. London, England: Grub Street. ISBN 9781906502843.
- Helgason, Guðmundur. "uboat.net".
- Hermon, George (1968). "Volume II - Royal Australian Navy, 1942-1945".
- Mason, Lt Cdr Geoffrey B., RN (2010). "Service Histories of 1,000 Royal and Dominion Navy Warships, including British Ships manned by Allied Navies". Naval History- World War 2 at Sea.
- Morison, Samuel Eliot (1963). The Two-Ocean War- A Short History of the United States Navy in the Second World War. Boston, Massachusetts: Little, Brown and Company. ISBN 0-316-58352-9.
- Mawdsley, Evan (2019). The War For The Seas- A Maritime History of World War II. New Haven Connecticut: Yale University Press. ISBN 978-0-300-19019-9.
- Overy, Richard (1995). Why The Allies Won. New York, New York: W.W. Norton & Company. ISBN 0-393-03925-0.
- Parshall, Jonathan; Tully, Anthony (2005). Shattered Sword. USA: Potomac Books.
- Pike, Francis (2019). Hirohito's War- The Pacific War 1941–1945. London: Bloomsbury Achidemic. ISBN 978-1-4725-9671-0.
- Roskill, Stephen (1960). The Navy At War 1939–1945. Chatham, Kent, Great Britain: Mackays of Chatham. ISBN 1-85326-697-3.
- Symonds, Craig L. (2018). World War II At Sea. New York, New York: Oxford University Press. ISBN 9780190243678.
- Toland, John (1965). The Last 100 Days. New York, New York & Toronto, Canada: Bantam Books. p. 102. ISBN 0-553-34208-8.
- Toland, John (1970). The Rising Sun – The Decline and Fall of the Japanese Empire 1936–1945. New York, New York: Random House.
- Toppan, Andrew (2003). "Haze Gray and Underway- Naval History and Photography". Haze Gray and Underway. Archived from the original on 23 July 2019.
- Tully, Anthony (2018). "Kido Butai!- Stories and Battle Histories of the IJN's Carrier Fleet".
- Whitehouse, Arch (1962). Squadrons of the Sea. New York, New York: Curtis Books- Modern Library Editions Publishing Company.
- Y'Blood, William T. (1983). Hunter-Killer US Escort Carriers in the Battle of the Atlantic. Annapolis, Maryland: Naval Institute Press. ISBN 0-87021-286-9.
- Y'Blood, William T. (1987). The Little Giants – U.S. Escort Carriers Against Japan. Annapolis, Maryland: Naval Institute Press. ISBN 0-87021-275-3.
- "Naval History and Heritage Command". U.S. Navy. 2019.
- "Naval War In The Pacific 1941-1945- Ships Index". Naval War In The Pacific 1941-1945.
- "NavSource Naval History – U.S. Naval Chronology of World War II". 2019.
- "Pocket Sized Aircraft Carriers- Merchant hulls into Warships". Royal Navy Research Institute. 2019.
- "World War II Database". Lava Development. 2019.
- "WW2 Aircraft Carriers". Military Factory. 2019.
