= List of aircraft carriers operational during World War II =

Naval historians such as Evan Mawdsley, Richard Overy, and Craig Symonds concluded that World War II's decisive victories on land could not have been won without decisive victories at sea. Naval battles to keep shipping lanes open for combatant's movement of troops, guns, ammunition, tanks, warships, aircraft, raw materials, and food largely determined the outcome of land battles. Without the Allied victory in keeping shipping lanes open during the Battle of the Atlantic, Britain could not have fed her people or withstood Axis offensives in Europe and North Africa. Without Britain's survival and without Allied shipments of food and industrial equipment to the Soviet Union, (Note: Britain and America shipped war-sustaining goods to the Soviet Union via Arctic Ocean, Persian Gulf, and Pacific Ocean routes.) her military and economic power would likely not have rebounded in time for Russian soldiers to prevail at Stalingrad and Kursk.

Without victories at sea in the Pacific theater, the Allies could not have mounted amphibious assaults on or maintained land forces on Guadalcanal, New Guinea, Saipan, The Philippines, Iwo Jima, or Okinawa. Allied operations in the Atlantic and Pacific war theaters were interconnected because they frequently competed for scarce naval resources for everything from aircraft carriers to transports and landing craft. Effective transport of troops and military supplies between the two war theaters required naval protection for shipping routes around the Cape of Good Hope, through the Suez canal, and through the Panama Canal. In both theaters, maritime dominance enabled combatants to use the sea for their own purposes and deprive its use by adversaries. As naval historian Admiral Herbert Richmond stated, "Sea power did not win the war itself: it enabled the war to be won".

Aircraft carriers played a major role in winning decisive naval battles, supporting key amphibious landings, and keeping critical merchant shipping lanes open for transporting military personnel and their equipment to land battle zones. This article is part of a series that covers World War II from the vantage point of aircraft carrier operations and is focused upon the types and names of the carriers themselves. It contains complete lists of aircraft carriers that operated at some point during the period from 1937 to 1945. For each carrier, the list includes date of commissioning and loss, if it was sunk during the war, and its location and operational status at the end of each month during the year after Pearl Harbor was attacked.

== Lists of aircraft carriers ==
Four types of ships are included in the list: fleet carriers, light carriers, escort carriers, and merchant aircraft carriers.

Fleet and Light Carriers. The number of each combatant's operational fleet and light carriers provides an indication of that country's offensive naval capability at any point in time. These carriers, typically with thirty to ninety aircraft, tended to form the core around which naval striking task forces were assembled during World War II. They could be used effectively in groups capable of launching hundreds of aircraft for massed attacks. At its peak at Pearl Harbor, Japan's main striking force, the Kidō Butai, included six fleet carriers (Note: Akagi, Kaga, Soryu, Hiryu, Shokaku, Zuikaku) with a total of over 400 aircraft. Later in the war, at the Battle of Iwo Jima, American Task Force 58 included 18 fleet and light carriers carrying more than 1,000 aircraft.

Escort carriers were smaller and slower than fleet or light carriers, but they were also less expensive to build and could virtually be mass-produced. Escort carriers typically carried twenty to thirty aircraft and were widely used for transport and defensive operations. Such operations included ferrying aircraft, troops and supplies and protecting convoys from attacks by submarines, merchant raiders, and land-based aircraft. Escort carriers were nonetheless highly capable and used for offensive operations as well. Such operations included providing close air support for ground forces during amphibious invasions, raids on enemy installations, and for hunting down enemy submarines and disrupting their refueling operations.

Merchant Aircraft Carriers. The British converted several commercial grain transports and oil tankers to merchant aircraft carriers (MACs). These ships transported critical supplies in their holds but, in addition, typically carried three or four Swordfish torpedo planes for defense. They had flight decks and were capable of launching and recovering aircraft at sea. Although these carriers were initially planned as stop gap measures until enough escort carriers became available, MACs proved effective and all but four of them continued in service until the end of the European war. (Note: MV Rapana, MV Amastra, MV Ancylus, MV Acavus were retired from service in October 1944.)

The lists includes only ships with flight decks that could launch and retrieve aircraft at sea. Ships without flight decks but relying upon catapults to launch and cranes to recover aircraft contributed more to defensive scouting and protection against enemy warships, submarines, and aircraft than to offensive operations. Fighter catapult ships (FACs) and catapult aircraft merchant ships (CAMs) were used early in the Atlantic Theater for convoy protection as stop-gap measures until more escort carriers became available. In the Pacific Theater, some battleships and cruisers had catapult-launched aircraft principally for scouting. These ships without flight decks are not included as "aircraft carriers" in the lists.

US hull numbers are included, when appropriate, to help avoid double-counting of the thirty-eight carriers transferred to Britain under Lend-Lease agreements. They also help with identifying carriers with the same names, such as Yorktown (CV-5) and Yorktown (CV-19).

=== Operational vs. non-operational carriers ===
The planning and outcomes of naval initiatives involving carriers were a function of the number that were "operational", ready for combat. The lists below indicate the number of carriers that were "operational," not just "afloat". Carriers are included as non-operational if they are in port being repaired for combat damage or undergoing an overhaul or refitting. They are also included as non-operational if they have been commissioned but were still undergoing shakedown trials. Finally, they are included as non-operational if they are in use only as a barracks ship or for storing goods. Carriers kept in port or otherwise not engaged in naval initiatives because of shortages of aircrews or fuel remain included as "operational."

The year 1942 was pivotal for the war. Axis powers worldwide reached their maximum territorial expansion before mid-year but were virtually contained by year-end. In the global maritime war, the Allies had won decisive victories in the Pacific and had kept the vital shipping lines open in both the Pacific and the Atlantic theaters. Aircraft carriers contributed significantly to this result. Four of the war's six major carrier battles were fought in 1942. Twelve of the combatants' fleet and light carriers were sunk, more than any other year and equal to 46% of the total lost during the entire war. The lists indicate the location, combat activity, and operational status of all carriers during 1942.

=== Abbreviations ===
Letters in these lists indicate the war zone, combat activity, and operational status of each carrier. For example, a carrier's location is indicated with an "a" if she were in the Atlantic Ocean and an "m" if in the Mediterranean Sea. If she were engaged in one of the six carrier battles during the month, a "B" is included. If she were lost in combat, an "L" is included. Entries in the "Carrier Battles" row indicate the month of major carrier battles, specifically Coral Sea (CS), Midway (MI), Eastern Solomons (ES), and Santa Cruz Islands (SC). Other abbreviations used in the lists are shown below.

1. Combat action during month

- B Engaged in one of the six carrier battles
- C Commissioned
- L Lost due to sinking or scuttling as a result of combat.
- Q Provided air cover for amphibious invasion
- R Engaged in carrier raid

2. Ship location at end of month

- a Atlantic Ocean
- g Arctic Ocean
- i Indian Ocean
- m Mediterranean Sea
- p Pacific Ocean

3. Operational status at end of month

- d Non-operational due to combat-related damaged.
- k Non-operational in use as a barracks or for storage.
- o Non-operational due to being refitted or overhauled.
- s Non-operational due to still in initial shakedown period or in transit to place for completing fitting-out or for initial embarkation of aircraft. This includes carriers transporting a load of aircraft from US to UK as part of going to UK to undergo completion to become fully operational.
- t Operational as a training vessel and/or engaged only in trials.
- v Non-operational, in reserve.
- x Operational but lacked sufficient crew, aircraft, or fuel to engage in combat operations.

The Atlantic Ocean, Mediterranean Sea, and Arctic Ocean are included with the "Atlantic theater." The Pacific Ocean and Indian Oceans are included with the "Pacific theater."

Entries on the "Operational Carriers" rows indicate separately the total number of carriers available for combat in the Atlantic and Pacific theaters at the end of each month that were afloat and not undergoing repairs due to combat damage, overhauling or refitting to upgrade performance, or otherwise not available for combat activity.

US hull numbers are included, when appropriate, to help avoid double-counting of the thirty-eight carriers transferred to Britain under Lend-Lease agreements. They also help with identifying carriers with the same names, such as Yorktown (CV-5) and Yorktown (CV-19).

== Operational during World War II ==
=== United States ===
The following table lists all American aircraft carriers that were operational between December 1941 and August 1945. It also includes information about their combat activity, location, and operational status for the end of each month from November 1941 to December 1942. The table reflects how America's carriers made hit-and-run raids on Japanese conquests, possessions, and even the homeland itself for the first five months of the war and then engaged in carrier-against-carrier battles. These four battles resulted in major attrition of naval strength on both sides. For a short period around the end of October 1942, America did not have an operational aircraft carrier in the Pacific Theater. But because of the losses inflicted upon Japan's carrier fleet during these battles, America gained the strategic initiative for the rest of the war.

	Name	Commissioned	Sunk/Scrapped	N 41	D 41	J 42	F 42	M 42	A 42	M 42	J 42	J 42	A 42	S 42	O 42	N 42	D 42
			Battles:							CS	MI		ES		SC		
	CV & CVL CARRIERS																
1	Saratoga CV-3	16-Nov-1927	25-Jul-1946	p	p	pd	pd	pd	pd	p	p	p	Bpd	pd	pd	Rpd	p
2	Lexington CV-2	14-Dec-1927	8-May-1942	p	p	p	p	Rp	p	BLp							
3	Ranger CV-4	4-Jun-1934	31-Jan-1947	a	a	a	a	ao	a	a	a	a	a	a	a	a	
4	Yorktown CV-5	30-Sep-1937	7-Jun-1942	a	p	p	Rp	Rp	p	Bp	BLp						
5	Enterprise CV-6	12-May-1938	1958	p	p	p	Rp	Rp	Rp	p	Bp	p	Bpd	pd	Bpd	p	p
6	Wasp CV-7	25-Apr-1940	15-Sep-1942	a	ao	a	a	a	a	a	p	p	Qp	Lp			
7	Hornet CV-8	20-Oct-1941	27-Oct-1942	a	a	a	p	p	Rp	p	Bp	p	p	p	Lp		
8	Essex CV-9	31-Dec-1942	1975														Cas
9	Independence CVL-22	14-Jan-1943	1951														
10	Lexington CV-16	17-Feb-1943	--														
11	Princeton CVL-23	25-Feb-1943	24-Oct-1944														
12	Belleau Wood CVL-24	31-Mar-1943	21-Nov-1960														
13	Yorktown CV-10	15-Apr-1943	--														
14	Bunker Hill CV-17	25-May-1943	1973														
15	Cowpens CVL-25	28-May-1943	1960														
16	Monterey CVL-26	17-Jun-1943	1971														
17	Cabot CVL-28	24-Jul-1943	2002														
18	Intrepid CV-11	16-Aug-1943	--														
19	Langley CVL-27	31-Aug-1943	1963														
20	Bataan CVL-29	17-Nov-1943	1961														
21	Wasp CV-18	24-Nov-1943	1973														
22	Hornet CV-12	29-Nov-1943	--														
23	San Jacinto CVL-30	15-Nov-1943	Dec-1971														
24	Franklin CV-13	31-Jan-1944	1966														
25	Hancock CV-19	15-Apr-1944	1-Sep-1976														
26	Ticonderoga CV-14	8-May-1944	15-Aug-1974														
27	Bennington CV-20	6-Aug-1944	1994														
28	Shangri-La CV-38	15-Sep-1944	1988														
29	Randolph CV-15	9-Oct-1944	1975														
30	Bon Homme Richard CV-31	26-Nov-1944	1992														
31	Antietam CV-36	28-Jan-1945	28-Feb-1974														
32	Boxer CV-21	16-Apr-1945	Feb-1971														
33	Lake Champlain CV-39	3-Jun-1945	Apr-1972														
	CVE CARRIERS																
1	Langley CV-1	20-Mar-1922	27-Feb-1942	p	p	p	Lp										
2	Long Island CVE-1 *1	2-Jun-1941	1977	a	a	at	at	at	at	p	p	p	p	pt	pt	pt	pt
3	Charger BAVG-4/CVE-30 *2	3-Mar-1942	1969					Cas	as	at	at	at	at	at	a	at	at
4	Copahee CVE-12 *3	15-Jun-1942	1961								Cps	ps	ps	p	po	po	po
5	Nassau CVE-16 *3	20-Aug-1942	1961										Cps	ps	p	p	p
6	Santee CVE-29 *4	24-Aug-1942	5-Dec-1959										Cas	as	a	Qad	a
7	Sangamon CVE-26 *4	25-Aug-1942	Aug-1960										Cas	ao	a	Qa	a
8	Altamaha CVE-18 *3	15-Sep-1942	1961											Cps	ps	p	p
9	Chenango CVE-28 *4	19-Sep-1942	12-Feb-1960											Cas	a	ad	p
10	Suwannee CVE-27 *4	24-Sep-1942	Jun-1962											Cas	a	a	p
11	Bogue CVE-9 *3	26-Sep-1942	1960											Cas	as	as	as
12	Card CVE-11 *3	8-Nov-1942	1971													Cps	ps
13	Core CVE-13 *3	10-Dec-1942	1971														Cps
14	Barnes CVE-20 *3	20-Feb-1943	1-Mar-1959														
15	Block Island CVE-21 *3	8-Mar-1943	29-May-1944														
16	Prince William CVE-31 *3	9-Apr-1943	1961														
17	Breton CVE-23 *3	12-Apr-1943	1972														
18	Croatan CVE-25 *3	28-Apr-1943	1971														
19	Casablanca CVE-55 *5	8-Jul-1943	1947														
20	Liscome Bay CVE-56 *5	7-Aug-1943	24-Nov-1943														
21	Coral Sea/Anzio CVE-57 *5	27-Aug-1943	24-Nov-1959														
22	Corregidor CVE-58 *5	31-Aug-1943	28-Apr-1959														
23	Mission Bay CVE-59 *5	13-Sep-1943	30-Apr-1959														
24	Guadalcanal CVE-60 *5	25-Sep-1943	30-Apr-1949														
25	Manila Bay CVE-61 *5	5-Oct-1943	2-Sep-1959														
26	Natoma Bay CVE-62 *5	14-Oct-1943	30-Jul-1959														
27	St. Lo/Midway CVE-63 *5	23-Oct-1943	25-Oct-1944														
28	Tripoli CVE-64 *5	31-Oct-1943	Jan-1960														
29	Wake Island CVE-65 *5	7-Nov-1943	19-Apr-1946														
30	White Plains CVE-66 *5	15-Nov-1943	29-Jul-1968														
31	Kalinin Bay CVE-68 *5	27-Nov-1943	8-Dec-1946														
32	Solomons CVE-67 *5	21-Nov-1943	22-Dec-1946														
33	Kasaan Bay CVE-69 *5	4-Dec-1943	2-Feb-1960														
34	Fanshaw Bay CVE-70 *5	9-Dec-1943	26-Sep-1959														
35	Kitkun Bay CVE-71 *5	15-Dec-1943	18-Nov-1946														
36	Tulagi CVE-72 *5	21-Dec-1943	8-May-1946														
37	Gambier Bay CVE-73 *5	28-Dec-1943	25-Oct-1944														
38	Nehenta Bay CVE-74 *5	3-Jan-1944	29-Jun-1960														
39	Hoggatt Bay CVE-75 *5	11-Jan-1944	31-Mar-1960														
40	Kadashan Bay CVE-76 *5	18-Jan-1944	13-Aug-1959														
41	Marcus Island CVE-77 *5	26-Jan-1944	29-Feb-1960														
42	Savo Island CVE-78 *5	3-Feb-1944	29-Feb-1960														
43	Ommaney Bay CVE-79 *5	11-Feb-1944	4-Jan-1945														
44	Petrof Bay CVE-80 *5	18-Feb-1944	30-Jul-1959														
45	Rudyerd Bay CVE-81 *5	25-Feb-1944	Jan-1960														
46	Saginaw Bay CVE-82 *5	2-Mar-1944	27-Nov-1959														
47	Sargent Bay CVE-83 *5	9-Mar-1944	30-Jul-1959														
48	Shamrock Bay CVE-84 *5	15-Mar-1944	May-1958														
49	Shipley Bay CVE-85 *5	21-Mar-1944	2-Oct-1959														
50	Sitkoh Bay CVE-86 *5	28-Mar-1944	30-Aug-1960														
51	Steamer Bay CVE-87 *5	4-Apr-1944	29-Aug-1959														
52	Cape Esperance CVE-88 *5	9-Apr-1944	14-May-1959														
53	Takanis Bay CVE-89 *5	15-Apr-1944	29-Jun-1960														
54	Thetis Bay CVE-90 *5	12-Apr-1944	Dec-1964														
55	Makassar Strait CVE-91 *5	27-Apr-1944	2-May-1961														
56	Windham Bay CVE-92 *5	3-May-1944	31-Dec-1960														
57	Makin Island CVE-93 *5	9-May-1944	1-Jan-1947														
58	Lunga Point CVE-94 *5	14-May-1944	3-Aug-1960														
59	Bismarck Sea CVE-95 *5	20-May-1944	21-Feb-1945														
60	Salamaua CVE-96 *5	26-May-1944	18-Nov-1946														
61	Hollandia CVE-97 *5	1-Jun-1944	31-Dec-1960														
62	Kwajalein CVE-98 *5	7-Jun-1944	11-Jan-1961														
63	Admiralty Islands CVE-99 *5	13-Jun-1944	2-Jan-1947														
64	Bougainville CVE-100 *5	18-Jun-1944	29-Aug-1960														
65	Matanikau CVE-101 *5	24-Jun-1944	27-Jul-1960														
66	Attu CVE-102 *5	30-Jun-1944	3-Jan-1947														
67	Roi CVE-103 *5	6-Jul-1944	31-Dec-1946														
68	Munda CVE-104 *5	8-Jul-1944	17-Jun-1960														
69	Commencement Bay CVE-105 *6	27-Nov-1944	>1971														
70	Block Island (2nd) CVE-106 *6	30-Dec-1944	23-Feb-1960														
71	Gilbert Islands CVE-107 *6	5-Feb-1945	1-Nov-1979														
72	Kula Gulf CVE-108 *6	12-May-1945	1971														
73	Cape Gloucester CVE-109 *6	5-Mar-1945	1962														
74	Salerno Bay CVE-110 *6	19-May-1945	1962														
75	Vella Gulf CVE-111 *6	19-Apr-1945	22-Oct-1971														
76	Siboney CVE-112 *6	14-May-1945	1971														
77	Puget Sound CVE-113 *6	18-Jun-1945	1962														
78	Bairoko CVE-115 *6	16-Jul-1945	1961														
	NUMBER OF CARRIERS AFLOAT																
	CVs & CVLs																
	Pacific Theater			3	4	4	5	5	5	4	4	4	4	3	2	2	2
	Atlantic Theater			4	3	3	2	2	2	2	1	1	1	1	1	1	2
	Total			7	7	7	7	7	7	6	5	5	5	4	3	3	4
	CVEs																
	Pacific Theater			1	1	1	0	0	0	1	2	2	3	4	4	5	8
	Atlantic Theater			1	1	1	1	2	2	1	1	1	3	6	6	6	4
	Total			2	2	2	1	2	2	2	3	3	6	10	10	11	12
	CVs, CVLs, & CVEs																
	Pacific Theater			4	5	5	5	5	5	5	6	6	7	7	6	7	10
	Atlantic Theater			5	4	4	3	4	4	3	2	2	4	7	7	7	6
	Total			9	9	9	8	9	9	8	8	8	11	14	13	14	16
	NUMBER OF CARRIERS OPERATIONAL																
	CVs & CVLs																
	Pacific Theater			3	4	3	4	4	4	4	4	4	2	1	0	1	2
	Atlantic Theater			4	2	3	2	1	2	2	1	1	1	1	1	1	1
	Total			7	6	6	6	5	6	6	5	5	3	2	1	2	3
	CVEs																
	Pacific Theater			1	1	1	0	0	0	1	1	1	1	2	2	3	5
	Atlantic Theater			1	1	1	1	1	1	1	1	1	1	1	5	3	3
	Total			2	2	2	1	1	1	2	2	2	2	3	7	6	8
	CVs, CVLs, & CVEs																
	Pacific Theater			4	5	4	4	4	4	5	5	5	3	3	2	4	7
	Atlantic Theater			5	3	4	3	2	3	3	2	2	2	2	6	4	4
	Total			9	8	8	7	6	7	8	7	7	5	5	8	8	11

The location, combat activity, and operational status for each American aircraft carrier at the end of each month over the entire war is available at the "Collection of Statistics on US Aircraft Carriers" in the reference document section at the World War II Database.

Notes:

- 1 Long Island-class converted from the C-3 hulled Mormacmail by Sun Shipbuilding and Dry Dock Company, Chester PA.
- 2 Charger-class converted from C-3 cargo ship hulls by Sun Shipbuilding and Dry Dock Company, Chester PA.
- 3 Bogue-class converted from C-3 cargo ship hulls by Seattle-Tacome Shipbuilding Corp., Tacoma WA, Ingalls Shipbuilding of Pascagoula MS, or Western Pipe and Steel Company, San Francisco CA.
- 4 Sangamon-class converted from fast fleet, T3 tanker Cimarron-class oiler hulls by Federal Shipbuilding or Dry Dock Company of Kearney NJ and Sun Shipbuilding and Dry Dock Company, Chester PA.
- 5 Casablanca-class (aka Kaiser-class) built on S-4-S2-BB3 merchant hulls by Kaiser Company at its Vancouver Yard in Washington state.
- 6 Commencement Bay-class built on T3 tanker hulls at Todd Pacific Tacoma.

Eight CVEs commissioned after the end of the war or acquired by the Navy but never commissioned are not included in the list. (Note: Escort carriers commissioned after August 1945 and not included in the counts for this article are Rendova (CVE-114, commissioned 22-Oct-1945)),Badoeng Straight (CVE-116, commissioned 14-Nov-1945), Saidor (CVE-117, commissioned 4-Sep-1945), Sicily (CVE-118, commissioned 27-Feb-1946), Point Cruz (CVE-119, commissioned 16-Oct-1945), Mindoro (CVE-120, 4-Dec-1945), and Palau (CVE-122, commissioned 15 Jan-1946). Escort carriers acquired by the Navy but never commissioned and not included in the counts for this article are Rabaul (CVE-121) and Tinian (CVE-123). Also not included in the counts are four escort carriers laid down but cancelled before launch, namely Bastogne (CVE-124), Eniwetok (CVE-125), Lingayen (CVE-126), and Okinawa (CVE-127).)

=== United Kingdom ===
British aircraft carriers of all types that had flight decks, were capable of launching and recovering aircraft, and that were operational sometime during the period from September 1939 to August 1945. Battleships, cruisers, seaplane carriers, seaplane tenders (SPT), catapult aircraft merchant ships (CAM) fighter catapult ships (FCS), and aircraft maintenance carriers (AMC) that launched using catapults and recovered using cranes are not included in the counts. During the war, the Royal Navy had at least thirty-five CAM, five FCS, (Note: Also referred to as catapult armed ships (CAS). HMS Ariguani, Maplin, Patia (sunk 1941), Pegasus, and Springbank (sunk 1941). Each carried a single aircraft and served as convoy escorts. Pegasus was originally commissioned in 1914 as the seaplane carrier HMS Ark Royal and her name changed to Pegasus in 1940 allowing the name to be reused.) one SPC, (Note: HMS Albatross. Served for convoy escort, anti-submarine patrols, and air-sea rescue in the Atlantic and provided trade protection and air cover for landings in the Indian Ocean.) and one AMC (Note: HMS Pioneer. Perseus was not completed until after the war ended. HMS HMS Unicorn was designed with an operational flight deck and served as a light aircraft carrier, including covering the amphibious landing at Salerno, Italy.) that are not included in the table.

During the war, two escort carriers – HMS Nabob and Puncher were crewed by Royal Canadian Navy but the aircrews aboard these carriers were British Fleet Air Arm.

Thirty-eight of Britain's forty-four escort carriers were built in the United States and transferred to Britain under the US Lend-Lease. These carriers were typically assigned hull numbers and names by the US but these were replaced by British names and pennant numbers. Notes below the table identify the shipyard from which the ship was launched. A total of one-hundred twenty-eight American-built escort carriers (with US hull numbers BAVG 1 to 6 and CVE 1 to 122) were commissioned during the war, into either the US or UK navy. Thirty-eight of these were commissioned into the Royal Navy (with UK pennant numbers between D01 and D98) and engaged during World War II.

	Name	Class/type	Commissioned	Sunk/Scrapped	N 41	D 41	J 42	F 42	M 42	A 42	M 42	J 42	J 42	A 42	S 42	O 42	N 42	D 42
				Battles:							CS	MI		ES		SC		
CVs & CVLs
1	Furious	Courageous-class	1925	1948	ao	ao	ao	ao	ao	ao	ao	ao	a	a	a	a	a	m
2	Argus		16 Sep 1918	5-Dec-1946	Med	Med	Med	Med	Med	a	a	a	a	a	a	a	Qa	a
3	Hermes		18 Feb 1924	9-Apr-1942	i	io	io	i	i	Li								
4	Eagle		26 Feb 1924	11-Aug-1942	ao	ao	a	a	ao	a	Med	Med	Med	Lm				
5	Courageous	Courageous-class	21 February 1928	17-Sep-1939														
6	Glorious	Courageous-class	24 February 1930	8-Jun-1940														
7	Ark Royal		16 Dec 1938	14-Nov-1941	Lm													
8	Illustrious	Illustrious-class	25 May 1940	Nov-1956	a	ad	ad	ad	a	i	i	i	i	i	i	io	ao	i
9	Formidable	Illustrious-class	15 Oct 1940	Jan-1953	a	a	a	i	i	i	i	i	i	a	a	a	Med	m
10	Victorious	Illustrious-class	29 Mar 1941	1969	a	a	a	a	Ra	a	a	a	a	ad	ao	ao	Qm	a
11	Indomitable	Illustrious-class	10 Oct 1941	1955	ao	i	i	i	i	i	Qi	io	Med	md	ad	ad	ad	ad
12	Unicorn	Light carrier/maintenance ship	12 Mar 1943	15-Jun-1959														
13	Indefatigable	Implacable-class	Mar 1944	Sep-1956														
14	Implacable	Implacable-class	June 1944	27-Oct-1955														
15	Colossus	Colossus class light fleet carrier	16 Dec 1944	22-Jan-1974														
16	Venerable	Colossus class	17 Jan 1945	2000														
17	Vengeance	Colossus class	Mar 1945	2004														
18	Glory	Colossus class	2 Apr 1945	23-Aug-1961														
19	Warrior	Colossus class	2 Apr 1945	1971														
20	Ocean	Colossus class	8 Aug 1945	1962														
CVEs
1	Audacity	converted merchant ship	20 Jun 1941	21-Dec-1941	a	La												
2	Archer	Long Island class	17-Nov-1941	1962	Cas	as	ad	ad	a	ao	a	a	ao	ao	ao	ao	Qa	ao
3	Avenger	Avenger-class escort carrier	2-Mar-1942	15-Nov-1942					Cas	ao	ao	ao	ao	a	a	a	QLm	
4	Biter	Avenger-class escort carrier	6-Apr-1942	1966						Cas	as	as	as	as	as	a	Qa	a
5	Dasher	Avenger-class escort carrier	2-Jul-1942	27-Mar-1943									Cas	as	as	Med	Qao	ao
6	Activity	converted merchant ship	29 Sep-1942	1967											Cas	as	as	as
7	Attacker	Bogue/Attacker class escort carrier	30-Sep-1942	1946											Cps	ps	ps	as
8	Battler	Bogue/Attacker class escort carrier	31 October 1942	1946												Cas	ad	as
9	Stalker	Bogue/Attacker class escort carrier	21-Dec-1942	1975														Cas
10	Hunter	Bogue/Attacker class escort carrier	20-Jan-1943	1965														
11	Tracker	Bogue/Attacker class escort carrier	31-Jan-1943	1964														
12	Fencer	Bogue/Attacker class escort carrier	20-Feb-1943	1975														
13	Searcher	Bogue/Attacker class escort carrier	7-Apr-1943	1976														
14	Chaser	Bogue/Attacker class escort carrier	9-Apr-1943	1972														
15	Ravager	Bogue/Attacker class escort carrier	25-Apr-1943	1973														
16	Striker	Bogue/Attacker class escort carrier	28-Apr-1943	1948														
17	Emperor	Bogue/Ruler class escort carrier	31-May-1943	1946														
18	Pursuer	Bogue/Attacker class escort carrier	14-Jun-1943	1946														
19	Atheling	Bogue/Ruler class escort carrier	3-Jul-1943	1967														
20	Ameer	Bogue/Ruler class escort carrier	20-Jul-1943	1969														
21	Begum	Bogue/Ruler class escort carrier	22-Jul-1943	1974														
22	Pretoria Castle	converted ocean liner	29-Jul-1943	1962														
23	Trumpeter	Bogue/Ruler class escort carrier	4-Aug-1943	1971														
24	Slinger	Bogue/Ruler class escort carrier	11-Aug-1943	1969														
25	Empress	Bogue/Ruler class escort carrier	12-Aug-1943	1946														
26	Khedive	Bogue/Ruler class escort carrier	25-Aug-1943	1975														
27	Nabob	Bogue/Ruler class escort carrier	7-Sep-1943	1977														
27	Shah	Bogue/Ruler class escort carrier	27-Sep-1943	1966														
29	Patroller	Bogue/Ruler class escort carrier	23-Oct-1943	1974														
30	Premier	Bogue/Ruler class escort carrier	3-Nov-1943	1974														
31	HMS Ranee	Bogue/Ruler class escort carrier	8-Nov-1943	1975														
31	Thane	Bogue/Ruler class escort carrier	19 Nov-1943	>1945														
33	Speaker	Bogue/Ruler class escort carrier	20-Nov-1943	1972														
34	Vindex	Nairana class	3-Dec-1943	Aug-1971														
35	Queen	Bogue/Ruler class escort carrier	7-Dec-1943	1972														
36	Nairana	Nairana class	12-Dec-1943	1971														
37	Ruler	Bogue/Ruler class escort carrier	20-Dec-1943	1946														
38	Arbiter	Bogue/Ruler class escort carrier	31-Dec-1943	1972														
39	Rajah	Bogue/Ruler class escort carrier	17-Jan-1944	1975														
40	Smiter	Bogue/Ruler class escort carrier	20-Jan-1944	1967														
41	Trouncer	Bogue/Ruler class escort carrier	31-Jan-1944	1973														
42	Puncher	Bogue/Ruler class escort carrier	5-Feb-1944	1973														
43	Reaper	Bogue/Ruler class escort carrier	18-Feb-1944	1967														
44	Campania	Nairana class	7-Mar-1944	1955														
MACs
1	Empire MacAlpine	MAC grain carrier	14-Apr-1943	1970														
2	Rapana	MAC oil tanker	Jul-1943	1958														
3	Empire MacAndrew	MAC grain carrier	7-Jul-1943	1970														
4	Amastra	MAC oil tanker	Sep-1943	1955														
5	Empire MacRae	MAC grain carrier	20-Sep-1943	1971														
6	Ancylus	MAC oil tanker	Oct-1943	1954														
7	Acavus	MAC oil tanker	Oct-1943	1963														
8	Empire MacKay	MAC oil tanker	5-Oct-1943	1959														
9	Empire MacColl	MAC oil tanker	Nov-1943	1962														
10	Alexia	MAC oil tanker	Dec-1943	1954														
11	Empire MacCabe	MAC oil tanker	Dec-1943	1962														
12	Empire MacMahon	MAC oil tanker	Dec-1943	1960														
13	Empire MacKendrick	converted grain carrier	12-12-1943	1975														
14	Empire MacCallum	converted grain carrier	22-Dec-1943	1960														
15	Miralda	MAC oil tanker	Jan-1944	1960														
16	Adula	MAC oil tanker	Feb-1944	1953														
17	Gadila	MAC oil tanker	Mar-1944	1958														
18	Empire MacDermott	MAC grain carrier	31-Mar-1944	1991														
19	Macoma	MAC oil tanker	1-Apr-1944	1959														
	CARRIERS AFLOAT																	
CVs & CVLs:
	Pacific				1	2	2	3	3	3	3	3	2	1	1	1	0	1
	Atlantic				7	6	6	5	5	4	4	4	5	5	5	5	6	5
	Total				8	8	8	8	8	7	7	7	7	6	6	6	6	6
CVEs:
	Pacific				0	0	0	0	0	0	0	0	0	0	1	1	1	0
	Atlantic				2	1	1	1	2	3	3	3	4	4	5	6	5	7
	Total				2	1	1	1	2	3	3	3	4	4	6	7	6	7
CVs, CVLs, and CVEs:
	Pacific				1	2	2	3	3	3	3	3	2	1	2	2	1	1
	Atlantic				9	7	7	6	7	7	7	7	9	9	10	11	11	12
	Total				10	9	9	9	10	10	10	10	11	10	12	13	12	13
CARRIERS OPERATIONAL
CVs & CVLs:
	Pacific				1	1	1	3	3	3	3	2	2	1	1	0	0	1
	Atlantic				4	3	4	3	3	3	3	3	5	3	3	3	4	4
	Total				5	4	5	6	6	6	6	5	7	4	4	3	4	5
CVEs:
	Pacific				0	0	0	0	0	0	0	0	0	0	0	0	0	0
	Atlantic				1	0	0	0	1	0	1	1	0	1	1	3	2	1
	Total				1	0	0	0	1	0	1	1	0	1	1	3	2	1
CVs, CVLs, and CVEs:
	Pacific				1	1	1	3	3	3	3	2	2	1	1	0	0	1
	Atlantic				5	3	4	3	4	3	4	4	5	4	4	6	6	5
	Total				6	4	5	6	7	6	7	6	7	5	5	6	6	6
CV & CVL RECAP
	Operational				5	4	5	6	6	6	6	5	7	4	4	3	4	5
	Non-Operational				3	4	3	2	2	1	1	2	0	2	2	3	2	1
	Total Afloat				8	8	8	8	8	7	7	7	7	6	6	6	6	6

=== Japan ===
The following table lists all Japanese aircraft carriers that were operational between July 1937 and August 1945. It also includes information about their combat activity, location, and operational status for the end of each month from November 1941 to December 1942. The table reflects how Japan's six fleet carriers (Note: Akagi, Kaga, Soryu, Hiryu, Shokaku, Zuikaku) of the Kidō Butai effectively raided and supported invasions during the first five months of the war, and how battle attrition over the following eight months materially weakened Japan's ability to project naval power.

	Carrier Name	Commis- sioned	Sunk/ Scrapped	N 41	D 41	J 42	F 42	M 42	A 42	M 42	J 42	J 42	A 42	S 42	O 42	N 42	D 42
			Battles:							CS	MI		ES		SC		
	Fleet & Light																
1	Hōshō CVL	12/27/1922	2-Sept-1946	p	p	p	p	p	p	p	Bp	pt	p	p	pt	pt	pt
2	Akagi CV	25-Mar-1927	5-Jun-42	p	Rp	Qp	Rp	Qp	Rp	p	BLp						
3	Kaga CV	30-Nov-1929	5-Jun-42	p	Rp	Qp	Rp	Qpd	pd	p	BLp						
4	Ryūjō CVL	9-May-1933	24-Aug-1942	p	Qp	Qp	Qp	Qp	Rpo	p	Bp	p	BLp				
5	Sōryū CV	29-Dec-1937	4-Jun-1942	p	RQp	Qp	Rp	Qp	Rp	p	BLp						
6	Hiryū CV	5-Jul-1939	5-Jun-1942	p	RQp	Qp	Rp	Qp	Rp	p	BLp						
7	Zuihō CVL	27-Dec-1940	25-Oct-1944	p	p	p	p	p	p	p	Bp	po	p	p	Bpd	pd	p
8	Shōkaku CV	8-Aug-1941	19-Jun-1944	p	Rp	Qp	po	p	Rp	Bpd	p	p	Bp	p	Bpd	pd	pd
9	Zuikaku CV	25-Sep-1941	25-Oct-1944	p	Rp	Qp	p	p	p	Bx	px	po	Bp	p	Bp	p	p
10	Shōhō CVL	30-Nov-1941	7-May-1942	Cp	ps	p	p	p	p	BLp							
11	Jun'yō CV	3-May-1942	1946							Cp	Bp	p	p	p	Bp	p	p
12	Hiyō CV	31-Jul-1942	20-Jun-1944									Cps	ps	ps	pd	pd	pd
13	Ryūhō CVL	30-Nov-1942	1946													Cps	pd
14	Chiyoda CVL	31-Oct-1943	25-Oct-1944														
15	Chitose CVL	1-Jan-1944	25-Oct-1944														
16	Taihō CV	7-Mar-1944	19-Jun-1944														
17	Unryū CV	6-Mar-1944	19-Dec-1944														
18	Amagi CV	10-Aug-1944	29-Jul-1945														
19	Katsuragi CV	15-Oct-1944	22-Dec-1946														
20	Shinano CV	19-Nov-1944	29-Nov-1944														
	CV & CVL Afloat			10	10	10	10	10	10	10	6	7	6	6	6	7	7
	CV & CVL Operational			9	9	10	9	9	8	9	6	4	5	5	3	3	4
	Escort																
1	Taiyō CVE	2-Sep-1941	18-Aug-1944	p	p	p	p	p	p	p	p	p	p	pd	p	p	p
2	Un'yō CVE	31-May-1942	17-Sep-1944							Cp	p	p	p	p	p	p	p
3	Chūyō CVE	25-Nov-1942	4-Dec-1943													Cps	p
4	Shin'yō CVE	15-Nov-1943	17-Nov-1944														
5	Kaiyō CVE	23-Nov-1943	10-Aug-1945														
	CVE Afloat			1	1	1	1	1	1	2	2	2	2	2	2	3	3
	CVE Operational			1	1	1	1	1	1	2	2	2	2	1	2	2	3
	Total																
	Total Afloat			11	11	11	11	11	11	12	8	9	8	8	8	10	10
	Total Operational			10	10	11	10	10	9	11	8	6	7	6	5	5	7

The location, combat activity, and operational status for each Japanese aircraft carrier at the end of each month over the entire war is available at the "Collection of Statistics on Japanese Aircraft Carriers" in the reference document section at the World War II Database.

The Imperial Japanese Navy typically named their aircraft carriers after flying creatures, real and mythical. Several carriers, however, retained the names they had before being converted to aircraft carriers. Names and their meanings are included in the following table. Also included are alternative names/spellings used for the carriers in various publications.

Carrier Name & Type	Date Commissioned	Named After	Name Meaning	Alternate Name/Spelling
Hosho (CVL)	27-Dec-22	Flying creature	Flying phoenix	Hosyo
Akagi (CV)	25-Mar-27	Extinct volcano		
Kaga (CV	30-Nov-29	Ancient Japanese province		
Ryujo (CVL)	09-May-33	Flying creature	Heavenly dragon	Ryuzyo, Rjudzo
Soryu (CV)	29-Dec-37	Flying creature	Green dragon	
Hiryu (CV)	05-Jul-39	Flying creature	Flying dragon	
Zuiho (CVL)	27-Dec-40	Flying creature	Lucky phoenix	
Shokaku (CV)	08-Aug-41	Flying creature	Soaring crane	Syokaku
Taiyo (CVE)	02-Sep-41	Flying creature	Great hawk	
Zuikaku (CV)	25-Sep-41	Flying creature	Lucky crane	
Shoho (CVL)	30-Nov-41	Flying creature	Happy phoenix	
Junyo (CV)	03-May-42	Flying creature	Peregrine Falcon	Hayataka
Unyo (CVE)	31-May-42	Flying creature	Hawk in the clouds	
Hiyo (CV)	31-Jul-42	Flying creature	Flying falcon	Hitaka, Haytaka, Hijo
Chuyo (CVE)	25-Nov-42	Flying creature	Heaven-bound hawk	
Ryuho (CVL)	30-Nov-42	Flying creature	Dragon phoenix	Rjuho
Chitose (CVL)	01-Nov-43	Japanese city		
Shinyo (CVE)	15-Nov-43	Flying creature	Godly hawk	
Kaiyo (CVE)	23-Nov-43	Flying creature	Sea hawk	
Chiyoda (CVL)	21-Dec-43	Japanese city		
Taiho (CV)	07-Mar-44	Flying creature	Great phoenix	
Unryu (CV)	06-Aug-44	Flying creature	Heaven-bound dragon	Unrju
Amagi (CV)	10-Aug-44	Extinct volcano		
Katsuragi (CV)	15-Oct-44	Japanese mountain		
Shinano (CV)	19-Nov-44	Ancient Japanese province		

Principal source: The Imperial Japanese Navy In The Pacific War

=== Other countries ===
France had one operational fleet carrier during the war, the Béarn. She patrolled in the Atlantic until the fall of France, after which she spent most of the war in Martinique and US ports. Her aircraft were never launched in combat. Construction of another carrier, the Joffre was begun but discontinued in 1940 when Germany occupied northern France. France also had a seaplane carrier, the Commandant Teste, that provided some aircraft transport service for Vichy France until she was scuttled in November 1942.

Germany worked on building aircraft carriers during the war but did not complete any in time for combat operations. The German fleet carrier, Graf Zeppelin, was launched in 1938 but was still under construction in 1945 as the war in Europe was ending. It was scuttled by the Germans but raised by the Russians, who used it as a target ship, sinking it in 1947.

Italy worked on but did not complete the aircraft carriers Sparviero and Aquila.

== Aircraft carriers sunk ==
In the early years of the war, the combatants risked and lost a high percentage of their carriers. By October 1942, after the carrier battles for the year, America, Britain, and Japan had, in both theaters, lost 15 fleet and light carriers between them. With new commissionings, they then had 15 such carriers afloat compared with the 18 they had in August 1939 at the beginning of war and 24 in December 1941 when Pearl Harbor was attacked. The following table shows the number of such carriers sunk each year of the war. The total number of escort carriers (CVE) sunk during the war is also shown.

Number of aircraft carriers lost during World War II
Year	United States	United Kingdom	Japan	Total
1939	not at war	1	not at war (Note: Japan had been involved in land war against China since 1937)	1
1940	not at war	1	not at war	1
1941	not at war	1	not at war	1
1942	4	2	6	12
1943	0	0	0	0
1944	1	0	9	10
1945	0	0	1	1
1939–1945 CV & CVL	5	5	16	26
1939–1945 CVE	7	3	5	15
1939–1945 CV, CVL, & CVE	12	8	21	41

Fleet and Light Carriers. Fifty-five new fleet and light carriers were commissioned between September 1939 and August 1945. Nineteen were operational at the beginning of the war and forty-eight were operational at the end; twenty-six were sunk.

Country	As Of Sep-1939	Comm. 1939–41	As Of Dec-1941	Comm. 1942–45	Sunk 1939–45	As Of Aug-1945
United States	5	+2	7	+26	-5	28 (Note: Includes Saratoga and Ranger that were used exclusively for training by the end of the war.)
United Kingdom	7	+4	11	+9	-5	15
Japan	6	+3	9	+11	-16	4 (Note: Includes Hōshō that was used exclusively for training by the end of the war.)
France	1	0	1	0	0	1 (Note: Includes Béarn that was refitted for use as an aircraft transport ship by the end of the war.)
Germany	0	0	0	0	0	0
Italy	0	0	0	0	0	0
Total	19	+9	28	+46	-26	48

Escort Carriers.

One-hundred twenty-seven escort carriers were commissioned between September 1939 and August 1945. Fifteen were sunk. Only one was operational at the beginning of this period and one-hundred thirteen were operational at the end. The US constructed and launched 115 escort carriers, 38 of those were transferred to the Royal Navy.

Escort carriers
Country	As Of Sep-1939	Comm. 1939–41	As Of Dec-1941	Launched 1942–45	Transferred 1942–45	Comm. 1942–45	Sunk 1939–45	As Of Aug-1945
United States	1 (Note: Includes Langley, the first US aircraft carrier which was reclassified as a seaplane tender before World War II began. She was used during the early months of the war to ferry aircraft and conduct anti-submarine patrols, just as an escort carrier would do. Because she could still transport, launch and retrieve aircraft, Langley is included here as an escort carrier rather than a seaplane tender.)	+1 (Note: USS Long Island.)	2	+114 (Note: Includes HMS Archer that was transferred on 17 November 1941. Includes thirty-eight CVEs that were constructed in the US and transferred to Britain.)	-38	+76	-7	71
United Kingdom	0	+1 (Note: HMS Audacity, converted in the UK from a German merchant ship.)	1	+5 (Note: Activity, Pretoria Castle, Vindex, Nairana, and Campania.)	+38	+43	-3	41
Japan	0	+1	1	+4	0	+4	-5 (Note: After uncontrolled flooding due to hitting mines and repeated bombing attacks, Kaiyō was intentionally grounded on July 25, 1945 in Beppu Bay to prevent her from sinking. The last combat crew members manning the anti-aircraft guns left the ship on August 9 and the ship was abandoned on August 10. She was scrapped in place beginning in Sept-1946.)	0
Total	1	+3	4	+123	0	+123	-15	112

Merchant Aircraft Carriers. Britain converted a total of nineteen merchant ships to Merchant Aircraft Carriers during the war. Nine of these were converted Royal Dutch Shell oil tankers, two of which operated under the flag of the Netherlands. (Note: MV Gadila and MV Macoma, which operated under Royal Navy rather than Royal Netherlands Navy control are included in the counts with the British MACs.) All served in the Atlantic theater and typically carried three or four Fairey Swordfish torpedo bombers. None were sunk during the war. Although they were initially envisioned as temporary, stop-gap measures until enough escort carriers became available for convoy protection, all but four served until the end of the war.

Aircraft Carriers Sunk. A total of forty-one fleet, light, and escort carriers were sunk between September 1939 and August 1945. The following table shows how they were sunk and the country whose military accomplished the sinking.

Sinkings
Country	Carrier-launched aircraft	Submarines	Gunfire From warships	Land-based aircraft	Total
United States	13	8	0 (Note: Gunfire from cruisers contributed to sinking of IJN carriers at the Battle of Leyte Gulf § Battle off Cape Engaño, part of the Battle of Leyte Gulf, but these sinkings are included under carrier-launched aircraft.)	0	21
Japan	4	2 (Note: USS Yorktown was disabled by IJN carrier aircraft. Recovery operations were progressing satisfactorily until it was hit by a torpedo from IJN submarine I-168. Accordingly, this is counted as a submarine sinking. The USS Wasp was also sunk by a submarine torpedo.)	4 (Note: Land-base aircraft sinkings includes those caused by kamikazes.)	2	12
Germany	0	6	0	1	7
United Kingdom	1	0	0	0	1
Total	18	16	4	3	41

Japanese CVEs were frequently attacked, damaged, and sunk by American submarines. During the war, these five CVEs served mostly as transports for aircraft, troops, and supplies and as cover for convoys doing the same. They made deliveries to and from destinations within Japan's defensive perimeter as far east as the Marshall Islands and as far west as Singapore. Destinations included Formosa, the Marianas, the Philippines, the Dutch East Indies (Java) the Palaus, and the Carolines (Truk). Four of the five CVEs were sunk by submarines, as were four fleet and light Japanese carriers. During the war, American submariners, while making up less than two percent of American naval personnel, sank over 30% of Japanese warship tonnage and 55% of merchant shipping tonnage. This effectiveness came at a high price. Fifty-two American submarines were lost during the war, all but three in Pacific waters. Over 3,500 men died. Three British submarines were sunk by the Japanese. (Note: HMS Stratagem, Porpoise, and Stonehenge.)

Sinkings
	Carrier	War Service Began	War Service Ended	Months War Svc.	Submarine Attacks	Sunk By
1	Taiyō CVE	8-Dec-1941	18-Aug-1944	32	5	Submarine
2	Un'yō CVE	31-May-1942	17-Sep-1944	28	8	Submarine
3	Chūyō CVE	25-Nov-1942	4-Dec-1943	12	3	Submarine
4	Shin'yō CVE	15-Nov-1943	17-Nov-1944	12	1	Submarine
5	Kaiyō CVE	23-Nov-1943	9-Aug-1945	21	0	Carrier Aircraft

The following table provides some detail for each of the forty-one aircraft carriers sunk during the war. (Note: Excludes Japanese seaplane carrier Mizuho sunk 5 May 1942 by torpedoes.)

Carrier	Date sunk	Location	Planes lost	People lost	Sunk by
HMS Courageous CV	17-Sep-1939	Off Iceland	?	519	2 Torpedoes from Sub German U-29
HMS Glorious CV	8-Jun-1940	North Sea off Norway	?	1,207	Guns from Scharnhorst and Gneisenau
HMS Ark Royal CV	14-Nov-1941	Off Gibraltar	?	1	1 Torpedo from Sub German U-81
HMS Audacity CVE	21-Dec-1941	North Atlantic off Spain	?	73	3 Torpedoes from German Sub U-751
USS Langley SPT	27-Feb-1942	Off Java	?	>16	Bombs from IJN LBA from Bali
HMS Hermes CVL	9-Apr-1942	Off Ceylon	0	307	Bombs from IJN Carrier Aircraft
IJN Shōhō CVL	7-May-1942	Coral Sea	?	834	7 Torpedoes,13 bombs from CA
USS Lexington CV	8-May-1942	Coral Sea	8?	216	CA from Shōkaku and Zuikaku
IJN Kaga CV	4-Jun-1942	Midway	90?	811	DB from USS Enterprise
IJN Sōryū CV	4-Jun-1942	Midway	70?	711	DB from USS Yorktown
IJN Akagi CV	5-Jun-1942	Midway	90?	267	DB from USS Enterprise
IJN Hiryū CV	5-Jun-1942	Midway	70?	389	DB from USS Yorktown
USS Yorktown CV	7-Jun-1942	Midway	?	141	2 Torpedoes from Hiryū CA & Torpedo from Sub IJN I-168
HMS Eagle CV	11-Aug-1942	Off Majorca	16	131	Torpedoes from Sub German U-73
IJN Ryūjō CVL	24-Aug-1942	Battle of the Eastern Solomons	?	120	1 Torpedo from TB and 3 Bombs from USS USS Saratoga
USS USS Wasp CV	15-Sep-1942	Off San Cristobal Is., Solomon Is.	45	193	3 Torpedoes from Sub IJN I-19
USS Hornet CV	27-Oct-1942	Santa Cruz	?	140	TB & DB from Zuikzku & Jun'yō
HMS Avenger CVE	15-Nov-1942	Off Algeria	?	514	1 Torpedo from Sub German U-155
HMS Dasher CVE	27-Mar-1943	Off Scotland	15?	379	Internal explosion
USS Liscome Bay CVE	24-Nov-1943	Off Makin Island	?	702	1 Torpedo from Sub IJN I-175
IJN Chūyō CVE	4-Dec-1943	Off Japan	?	1,250	Torpedoes from Sub USS Sailfish
USS Block Island CVE	29-May-1944	Off Canary Is.	>6?	6	3 Torpedoes from Sub German U-549
IJN Shōkaku CV	19-Jun-1944	Philippine Sea	?	1,272	3 Torpodoes from Sub USS Cavalla
IJN Taihō CV	19-Jun-1944	Philippine Sea	?	1,650	1 Torpedo fromSub USS Albacore
IJN Hiyō CV	20-Jun-1944	Philippine Sea	?	247	2 DB bombs & 1 Torpedo from USS Belleau Wood|
IJN Taiyō CVE	18-Aug-1944	Off Philippines	?	790	1 Torpedo from Sub USS Rasher
IJN Un'yō CVE	17-Sep-1944	Convoy HI-74 from Singapore	?	1,000e	2 Torpedoes from Sub USS Barb
USS Princeton CVL	24-Oct-1944	Off Luzon	?	108	Single bomb from LBA
USS Gambier Bay CVE	25-Oct-1944	Off Samar	?	?	Gunfire from IJN Chikuma and possibly also from IJN Yamato
USS St. Lo CVE	25-Oct-1944	Off Samar	?	113	Kamikaze
IJN Zuikzku CV	25-Oct-1944	NE of Cape Engano	0	20?	US CA bombs & torpedoes
IJN Zuihō CVL	25-Oct-1944	NE of Cape Engano	0	215	US CA bombs & torpedoes
IJN Chiyoda CVL	25-Oct-1944	NE of Cape Engano	0	1,470	US CA bombs, torpedoes & gunfire
IJN Chitose CVL	25-Oct-1944	NE of Cape Engano	0	903	US CA bombs, torpedoes & gunfire
IJN Shin'yō CVE	17-Nov-1944	East China Sea	10?	1,130	4 Torpedoes from Sub USS Spadefish
IJN Shinano CV	29-Nov-1944	Off Japan	50	1,435	Torpedoes from Sub USS Archerfish
IJN Unryū CV	19-Dec-1944	East China Sea	30	1,238	2 Torpedoes from Sub USSRedfish
USS Ommaney Bay CVE	4-Jan-1945	Sulu Sea off Philippines	?	95	Kamikaze
USS Bismarck Sea CVE	21-Feb-1945	Iwo Jima	?	318	2 Kamikaze
IJN Amagi CV	29-Jul-1945	Kure Harbor, Japan	0	few	Bombs from Allied CA
IJN Kaiyō CVE	24 July to 10 August 1945	Beppu Bay, Japan	0	20	Attacked by naval aircraft and USAAF bombers

Abbreviations:

- "DB" Indicates Dive Bombers
- "CA" Indicates Carrier Aircraft
- "Ger" Indicates German
- "IJN" indicated Imperial Japanese Navy
- "LBA" Indicates Land-Based Aircraft
- "Sub" Indicates Submarine
- 'TB" Indicates Torpedo Bomber

The following table shows how each combatant's carriers were sunk.

cause
	USN	RN	IJN	Total	Percent
Bombs	2	1	7	10	24%
Bombs & Aerial Torpedoes	2	0	5	7	17%
Kamikazes	3	0	0	3	7%
Aerial & Submarine Torpedoes	1	0	0	1	2%
Aerial Torpedoes	0	0	0	0	0%
Submarine Torpedoes	3	5	8	16	39%
Warship Gunfire	1	1	0	2	5%
Mines	0	0	1	1	2%
Mechanical Failures	0	1	0	1	2%
All Causes	12	8	21	41	100%

== Non-operational aircraft carrier time ==
=== Carrier non-operational time due to combat-related damage ===
The table below shows the combat-related actions during the war that resulted in carriers not being "operational", i.e., not available for combat activity.

Carrier damage
Carrier	Date	Location	Action	Cause category	Principal cause of carrier damage
HMS Courageous	17 September 1939	Off Iceland		Submarine attack	Sunk, Submarine torpedo
HMS Eagle	14 March 1940			Mechanical failure	explosion of bomb in magazine
HMS Glorious	8 June 1940	Norwegian Sea	Battle of Norway	Gunfire from warships	Sunk, Battleship gunfire
HMS Illustrious	10 January 1941 follow-up attacks on 16-01-1941, 19-01-1941	South of Sicily	Operation Excess supply convoy to Malta; Under repair in harbour	Air attack	Bombs- land based aircraft
HMS Ark Royal	22 March 1941	Atlantic	Search for Scharnhorst and Gneisanau	Aircraft accidents	Ran over own aircraft and depth charge detonated
Hermes	15 May 1941			Collision	Collision with RMS Corfu
Formidable CV-R67	26 May 1941		passage to launch strikes on Scarpanto	Air attack	Bombs- land based aircraft
Indomitable CV-R92	3 November 1941			Groundings	Ran aground
Ark Royal CV-91	4 November 1941	Off Gibraltar		Submarine attack	Sunk, Submarine torpedo
Illustrious CV-R87	16 December 1941			Collision	Collision with friendly warship
Audacity CVE-D10	21 December 1941	Off Gibraltar	Convoy escort to Convoy HG 76	Submarine attack	Sunk, Torpedoed by U-boat
Saratoga CV-3	1/11/42			Submarine attack	Submarine attack
Kaga CV	2/9/42	Palau	--	Groundings	Run Aground
Langley CV-1	2/27/42	Off Java		Air attack	Sunk, Bombs- land based aircraft
Wasp CV-7	3/16/42			Collisions	Collision with warship
Hermes CVL-95	4/9/42	Off Ceylon		Air attack	Sunk, Bombs from carrier launched dive bombers
Ryuho CVL	4/18/42	Japan	Doolittle Raid	Air attack	Bombs- carrier aircraft
Shoho CVL	5/7/42	Coral Sea	Battle of Coral Sea	Air attack	Sunk, Bombs & Aerial Torpedoes
Lexington CV-2	5/8/42	Coral Sea	Battle of Coral Sea	Bombs & Aerial Torpedoes	Sunk, Aerial torpedoes & bombs
Shōkaku CV	5/8/42	Coral Sea	Battle of the Coral Sea	Air attack	Bombs- carrier aircraft
Yorktown CV-5	5/8/42	Coral Sea	Coral Sea	Air attack	Bombs- Carrier launched aircraft
Akagi CV	6/4/42	Off Midway Island	Battle of Midway	Bombs	Sunk, Bombs- carrier aircraft dive bombers
Kaga CV	6/4/42	Off Midway Island	Battle of Midway	Air attack	Sunk, Bombs- carrier aircraft dive bombers
Sōryū CV	6/4/42	Off Midway Island	Battle of Midway	Air attack	Sunk, Bombs- carrier aircraft dive bombers
Yorktown CV-5	6/4/42	Off Midway Island	Battle of Midway	Aerial & Submarine attack	Sunk, Aerial torpedoes & Submarine attack
Hiryū CV	6/5/42	Off Midway Island	Battle of Midway	Air attack	Sunk, Bombs- carrier aircraft dive bombers
Eagle	11-08-1942	off Cape Salinas, Majorca	Operation Pedestal	Submarine attack	Sunk, Submarine torpedo
Indomitable CV-R92	8/12/42			Air attack	Bombs- land based aircraft
Victorious CV-R38	8/12/42			Air attack	Bombs- land based aircraft
Ryūjō CVL	8/24/42	Solomon Islands	Battle of Eastern Solomons	Air attack	Sunk, Bombs & Aerial Torpedoes
Enterprise CV-6	8/24/42			Air attack	Bombs- Carrier launched aircraft
Saratoga CV-3	8/31/42			Submarine attack	Submarine attack
Wasp CV-7	9/15/42	Off San Cristobal		Submarine attack	Sunk, Submarine attack
Taiyō CVE	9/28/42	Truk		Submarine attack	Submarine torpedo
Hiyō CV	10/17/42	Guadalcanal		Mechanical Failure	Shipboard accident- Fire in generator room
Hornet CV-8	10/27/42	Santa Cruz		Bombs & Aerial Torpedoes	Sunk, Aerial torpedoes & bombs
Shōkaku CV	10/26/42	Santa Cruz Islands	Battle of Santa Cruz Islands	Air attack	Bombs- carrier aircraft
Enterprise CV-6	10/26/42			Air attack	Bombs- Carrier launched aircraft
Zuihō CVL	10/26/42	Santa Cruz Islands	Battle of Santa Cruz Islands	Air attack	Bombs
Santee CVE-29	10/30/42	Atlantic	Escort duty	Aircraft Accidents	Accidental bomb damage during launch
Hiyō CV	11/13/42	Truk		Air attack	Bombs
Avenger CVE BAVG-2/D14	11/15/42	Off Algeria	Operation Torch	Submarine attack	Sunk, Torpedoed by U-boat
Sangamon CVE-26	11/20/42			Weather	Atlantic storm
Chenango CVE-28	11/20/42			Weather	Atlantic storm
Hiyō CV	11/27/42	Truk		Air attack	Bombs
Ryūhō CVL	12/12/42			Submarine attack	Submarine torpedo
Dasher (D37)	2/18/43	UK	Convoy escort	Weather	Extreme weather
Dasher (D37)	3/27/43	Clyde estuary	Returning for repair	Mechanical Failures	Sank following internal explosion
Taiyō CVE	4/9/43	Saipan/Truk		Submarine attack	Submarine torpedo (detonated prematurely)
Chūyō CVE	4/9/43	Saipan/Truk	Convoy escort	Submarine attack	Submarine torpedo (did not detonate)
Searcher CVE-D40	5/27/43	Atlantic Ocean		Weather	Atlantic storm
Hiyō CV	6/10/43	Mijake Island		Submarine attack	Submarine torpedo
Chaser CVE-32	7/7/43	England		Mechanical Failures	Explosion in boiler room
Indomitable CV-R92	7/16/43	Ionian Sea	Invasion of Sicily	Aerial Torpedoes	Torpedoed by land based aircraft
Taiyō CVE	9/24/43	Truk/Yokosuka		Submarine attack	Submarine torpedo
Cowpens CVL-25	10/18/43			Collisions	Collisions with friendly warships
Jun'yō CV	11/5/43	Bungo Suido		Submarine attack	Submarine torpedo
Biter CVE BAVG-3/D97	11/16/43	Atlantic	Convoy escort	Aircraft Accidents	Damage from ditched aircraft
Independence CVL-9	11/20/43	Gilberts	Galvanic	Aerial Torpedoes	Aerial torpedoes
Liscome Bay CVE-56	11/24/43	Off Makin Island	Battle of Makin	Submarine attack	Sunk, Submarine attack
Ravager CVE-24/D70	11/29/43	Scotland		Collisions	Collision with HMS Pretoria Castle
Pretoria Castle CVE	11/29/43	England		Collisions	Collision with HMS Ravager
Chūyō CVE	12/4/43	Off Japan	Convoy escort	Submarine attack	Sunk, Submarine torpedo
Lexington CV-16	12/4/43	Kwajalein	Raid on Kwajalein	Aerial Torpedoes	Aerial torpedoes
Belleau Wood CV-24	1/7/44			Collisions	Collisions with friendly warships
Un'yō CVE	1/19/44	Guam		Submarine attack	Submarine torpedo
Vindex CVE-D15	1/22/44	Scotland		Collisions	Dragged anchor, collided with HMS Pursuer
Attacker CVE-7/D02	1/22/44	Scotland		Collisions	Collision with HMS Chaser, which dragged anchor in gale
Attacker CVE-7/D02	1/24/44	Scotland		Collisions	Collision with HMS Fencer, which dragged anchor in gale
Sagamon CVE-26	1/25/44			Aircraft Accidents	Crash landing
Sagamon CVE-26	1/26/44			Collisions	Collision with warship (CVE Suwannee)
Queen CVE-49/D19/R320	1/26/44	Canada		Groundings	Ran Aground
Suwannee CVE-27	1/26/44	Enroute Marshalls		Collisions	Collision with warship (CVE Sangamon)
Slinger CVE-32/D26	2/5/44	Off Lowestoff, England	During work-up	Mines	Hit a mine
White Plains CVE-66	2/7/44	Marshalls	Transport	Collision	Collision with warship
Intrepid CV-11	2/17/44			Aerial Torpedoes	Aerial torpedoes
Vindex CVE-D15	2/25/44	Scotland	Flying exercises	Aircraft Accidents	Aircraft crashes (water in fuel)
Chaser CVE-D32	3/14/44	Scotland		Collision	Collision with HMS Attacker, then grounded
Khedive CVE-39/D62	3/22/44	England		Collision	Collision with merchant ship
Fencer CVE-D64	May-44	Arctic Ocean	Convoy Escort	Weather	Arctic storm
Block Island CVE-106	5/29/44	Off Canary Islands		Submarine attack	Sunk, Submarine attack
Tracker CVE BAVG-6/D24)	6/10/44	England	Operation Neptune	Collisions	Collision warship
Fenshaw Bay CVE-68	6/17/44	Saipan	Invasion of Saipan	Air attack	Bomb
Mission Bay CVE-59	6/17/44	New York Harbor	Transporting aircraft	Collisions	Collision with a dredge
Taihō CV	6/19/44	San Bernardino Straits	Battle of Philippine Sea	Submarine attack	Sunk, Submarine torpedo
Shōkaku CV	6/19/44	Philippine Sea	Battle of Philippine Sea	Submarine attack	Sunk, Submarine torpedo
Bunker Hill CV-17	6/19/44			Air attack	Bomb near miss
Hiyō CV	6/20/44	Philippine Sea	Battle of Philippine Sea	Air attack	Sunk, Bombs- carrier aircraft
Jun'yō CV	6/20/44	Philippine Sea	Battle of Philippine Sea	Air attack	Bombs- carrier aircraft
Chiyoda CVL	6/20/44	Philippine Sea	Battle of Philippine Sea	Air attack	Bombs- carrier aircraft
Zuikaku CV	6/20/44	Philippine Sea	Battle of Philippine Sea	Air attack	Bombs- carrier aircraft
Ryūhō CVL	6/20/44	Philippine Sea	Battle of Philippine Sea	Air attack	Bombs- Near miss by aerial bomb
Taiyō CVE	8/18/44	Off Philippines	Convoy escort	Submarine attack	Sunk, Submarine torpedo
Nabob CVE-41/D77	8/22/44	Norway?		Submarine attack	Torpedoed by U-boat
Biter CVE BAVG-3/D97	8/24/44	Scotland	During conversion	Mechanical Failures	Fire damage
Khedive CVE-39/D62	9/8/44	Alexandria		Collisions	Collision with merchant ship
Breton CVE-23	9/13/44	?	?	Collisions	Collision with warship
Un'yō CVE	9/17/44	Off Singapore	Convoy escort	Submarine attack	Sunk, Submarine torpedo
Vindex CVE-D15	9/26/44	Scotland		Collisions	Dragged anchor, collided with troop ship
Franklin CV-13	10/13/44			Aircraft Accidents	Enemy plane crash on deck
Franklin CV-13	10/13/44			Aircraft Accidents	Near crash of plane
Hancock CV-19	10/14/44			Air attack	Bomb- land based aircraft
Saratoga CV-3	10/14/44			Collisions	Collisions with friendly warships
Franklin CV-13	10/16/44			Air attack	Bombs- Carrier launched aircraft
Sagamon CVE-26	10/20/44	Off Leyte	Battle of Leyte Gulf	Air attack	Bombs- Land based bombers?
Princeton CVL-23	10/24/44	Off Luzon	Battle of Leyte Gulf	Air attack	Sunk, Bombs- land based aircraft
Zuikaku CV	10/25/44	Cape Engano	Battle off Cape Engano	Air attack	Sunk, Bombs & Aerial Torpedoes- carrier aircraft
Chiyoda CVL	10/25/44	Cape Engano	Battle off Cape Engano	Air attack	Sunk, Bombs- carrier aircraft & cruiser gunfire
Zuihō CVL	10/25/44	Cape Engano	Battle off Cape Engano	Air attack	Sunk, Bombs & Aerial Torpedoes
Chitose CVL	10/25/44	Cape Engano	Battle off Cape Engano	Air attack	Sunk, Bombs- carrier aircraft & cruiser gunfire
Gambier Bay CVE-73	10/25/44	East of Sumar	Battle off Sumar	Warship Gunfire	Sunk, Battleship(?) and cruiser gunfire
St. Lo/Midway CVE-63	10/25/44	East of Sumar	Battle off Sumar	Kamikazes	Sunk, Kamakaze
White Plains CVE-66	10/25/44	Off Sumar	Battle off Sumar	Kamikazes	Kamikaze
Kalinin Bay CVE-67	10/25/44	Off Sumar	Battle off Sumar	Kamikazes	Kamikaze
Fenshaw Bay CVE-68	10/25/44	East of Sumar	Battle off Sumar	Warship Gunfire	Cruiser and destroyer gunfire
Santee CVE-29	10/25/44	Leyte		Kamikazes	Kamikaze
Kitkun Bay CVE-71	10/25/44	East of Sumar	Battle off Sumar	Kamikazes	Kamikaze
Sagamon CVE-26	10/25/44	Off Leyte	Battle of Leyte Gulf	Kamikazes	Kamikaze
Suwannee CVE-27	10/25/44	Off Layte	Battle off Sumar	Kamikazes	Kamikaze
Sagamon CVE-26	10/26/44	Off Leyte	Battle of Leyte Gulf	Kamikazes	Kamikaze
Franklin CV-13	10/30/44			Kamikazes	Kamikazi attacks
Belleau Wood CV-24	10/30/44			Kamikazes	Kamikazi attacks
Intrepid CV-11	10/30/44			Kamikazes	Kamikazi attacks
Lexington CV-16	11/5/44	Leyte	Leyte	Kamikazes	Kamikazi attacks
Saginaw Bay CVE-80	11/10/44	Manus		Explosions Nearby	Explosion of nearby ammunition ship
Petrof Bay CVE-79	11/10/44	Manus		Explosions Nearby	Explosion of nearby ammunition ship
Shinyo CVE	11/17/44	East China Sea		Submarine attack	Sunk, Submarine torpedo
Intrepid CV-11	11/25/44			Kamikazes	Kamikazi attacks
Cabot CV-28	11/25/44			Kamikazes	Kamikazi attacks
Independence CVL-9	11/25/44			Aircraft Accidents	Crash landing
Essex CV-9	11/25/44	Philippines	KING II	Kamikazes	Kamikazi
Hancock CV-19	11/25/44			Kamikazes	Kamikazi attacks
Shinano CV	11/29/44	Off Japan		Submarine attack	Sunk, Submarine torpedo
Jun'yō CV	12/8/44	Mako		Submarine attack	Submarine torpedo
Reaper CVE-54/D82/R324	12/9/44	Scotland	Ferry Service	Collisions	Collision with merchant ship
Premier CVE-42/D23	12/15/44	Norway	Minelaying	Weather	Weather damage
Trumpeter CVE-37/D09	12/15/44	Norway		Weather	Weather damage
Marcus Island CVE-77	12/15/44	Mindoro	LOVE3	Kamikazes	Kamikaze
Cape Esperance CVE-88	12/18/44	Philippine Sea		Weather	Typhoon Cobra
Nehenta Bay CVE-74	12/18/44	Philippine Sea		Weather	Typhoon Cobra
Monterey CVL-26	12/18/44			Weather	Typhoon
Cabot CVL-28	12/18/44			Weather	Typhoon
Cowpens CVL-25	12/18/44			Weather	Typhoon
San Jacinto CVL-30	12/18/44			Weather	Typhoon
Altamaha CVE-18	12/18/44			Weather	Typhoon
Kwajalein CVE-98	12/18/44	Philippine Sea		Weather	Typhoon Cobra
Coral Sea/Anzio CVE-57	12/18/44			Weather	Typhoon
Unryū CV	12/19/44	East China Sea	Returning from transport mission	Submarine attack	Sunk, Submarine torpedo
Sargent Bay CVE-82	1/3/45	Philippine Sea		Collisions	Collision with warship
Ommaney Bay CVE-79	1/4/45	Off Philippines		Kamikazes	Sunk, Kamikaze
Manila Bay CVE-61	1/5/45	Sulu Sea	Invasion of Mindoro	Kamikazes	Kamikaze
Savo Island CVE-78	1/5/45	Lingayen	Invasion of Lingayen	Kamikazes	Kamikaze
Kitkun Bay CVE-71	1/8/45	Luzon	Invasion of Luzon	Kamikazes	Kamikaze
Kadashan Bay CVE-76	1/8/45	Luzon	Mike1	Kamikazes	Kamikaze
Salamaua CVE-96	1/13/45	Luzon	Invasion of Luzon	Kamikazes	Kamikaze
Thane CVE-48/D48	1/15/45	Scotland		Submarine attack	Torpedoed by U-boat
Hoggatt Bay CVE-75	1/15/45	Luzon	MIKE1	Aircraft Accidents	Crash landing with bomb explosion
Vindex CVE-D15	1/16/45	Arctic Ocean		Weather	Extreme weather
Langley CVL-27	1/16/45			Kamikazes	Kamikazi attacks
Nehenta Bay CVE-74	1/17/45	Philippines		Weather	Storm
Ticonderoga CV-14	1/21/45			Kamikazes	Kamikazi attacks
Hancock CV-19	1/21/45			Aircraft Accidents	Crash Landing
Ravager CVE-D70	1/28/45	England		Collisions	Collision with merchant ship
Bismark Sea CVE-95	2/21/45	Off Iwo Jima	Invasion of Iwo Jima	Kamikazes	Sunk, Kamikazes
Saratoga CV-3	2/21/45			Kamikazes	Kamikazi attacks
Langley CVL-27	2/21/45			Air attack	Bombs- Carrier launched aircraft
Lunga Point CVE-94	2/21/45	Off Iwo Jima	Invasion of Iwo Jima	Kamikazes	Kamikaze
San Jacinto CVL-30	2/27/45			Collisions	Collisions with friendly warships
Randolph CV-15	3/11/45			Kamikazes	Kamikazi attacks
Enterprise CV-6	3/18/45			Kamikazes	Kamikazi attacks
Yorktown CV-10	3/18/45	Off Japan	Raids on Japan home islands	Air attack	Bombs- Carrier launched aircraft
Ryūhō CVL	3/19/45	Kure	Raids on Home Islands	Air attack	Bombs
Franklin CV-13	3/19/45			Air attack	Bombs- Carrier launched aircraft
Amagi CV	3/19/45	Kure	Raids on Home Islands	Air attack	Bombs- carrier aircraft
Wasp CV-18	3/19/45			Air attack	Bombs- land based aircraft?
Kaiyō CVE	3/19/45	Kure	Raids on Home Islands	Air attack	Bombs- carrier aircraft
Essex CV-9	3/19/45			Friendly Fire	Friendly fire
Hōshō CVL	3/19/45	Inland Sea	Raids on Home Islands	Air attack	Bombs- carrier aircraft
Katsuragi CV	3/19/45	Kure	Raids on Home Islands	Air attack	Bombs- carrier aircraft
Enterprise CV-6	3/20/45			Friendly Fire	Friendly fire
Sagamon CVE-26	3/25/45	Okinawa	ICEBERG	Collisions	Collision with warship
Illustrious CV-R87	4/1/45			Kamikazes	Kamikazi
Indefatigable CV-R10	4/1/45			Kamikazes	Kamikazi
Indomitable CV-R92	4/1/45			Kamikazes	Kamikazi
Essex CV-9	4/2/45			Collisions	Collisions with friendly warships
Wake Island CVE-65	4/3/45	Okinawa	Invasion of Okinawa	Kamikazes	Kamakaze
Illustrious CV-R87	4/6/45			Kamikazes	Kamikaze
San Jacinto CVL-30	4/6/45			Kamikazes	Kamikazi attacks
Hancock CV-19	4/7/45			Kamikazes	Kamikazi attacks
Chenango CVE-28	4/9/45		ICEBERG	Aircraft Accidents	Crash landing
Essex CV-9	4/11/45			Air attack	Bombs- Carrier launched aircraft
Enterprise CV-6	4/11/45			Kamikazes	Kamikazi attacks
Intrepid CV-11	4/16/45			Kamikazes	Kamikazi attacks
Bataan CVL-29	4/17/45			Kamikazes	Kamikazi attacks
Corregidor CVE-58	4/20/45	East of Marianas		Weather	Typhoon
Steamer Bay CVE-87	4/25/45	Okinawa area		Collisions	Collision with warship
Sagamon CVE-26	5/4/45	Kerama Retto	ICEBERG	Kamikazes	Kamikaze
Formidable CV-R67	5/4/45			Kamikazes	Kamikaze
Indomitable CV-R92	5/4/45			Kamikazes	Kamikazi
Formidable CV-R67	5/9/45			Kamikazes	Kamikaze
Victorious CV-R38	5/9/45			Kamikazes	Kamikazi
Bunker Hill CV-17	5/11/45			Kamikazes	Kamikazi attacks
Bataan CVL-29	5/13/45			Friendly Fire	Friendly fire
Enterprise CV-6	5/14/45			Kamikazes	Kamikazi attacks
Shipley Bay CVE-85	5/16/45	Okinawa area		Refueling Accidents	Damaged oil tanks refueling
Formidable CV-R67	5/18/45			Aircraft Accidents	Crash landing
Indomitable CV-R92	5/20/45			Collisions	Collision with friendly warship
Suwannee CVE-27	5/24/45	Sakishima Gunto	ICEBERG	Aircraft Accidents	Crash landing
Belleau Wood CVL-24	6/4/45			Weather	Typhoon
Hornet CV-12	6/5/45			Weather	Typhoon
Bennington CV-20	6/5/45			Weather	Typhoon
Salamaua CVE-96	6/5/45	Okinawa	Invasion of Okinawa	Weather	Typhoon
Bougainville CVE-100	6/5/45	Off Okinawa		Weather	Typhoon
Attu CVE-102	6/5/45	Off Okinawa		Weather	Typhoon
Windham Bay CVE-92	6/5/45	Okinawa area		Weather	Typhoon
San Jacinto CVL-30	6/6/45			Weather	Typhoon
Natoma Bay CVE-62	6/7/45	Okinawa	Invasion of Okinawa	Kamikazes	Kamakaze
Randolph CV-15	6/7/45	Leyte		Aircraft Accidents	Crash landing of P-38
Randolph CV-15	6/7/45			Aircraft Accidents	Crash landing P-38
Steamer Bay CVE-87	6/11/45	Okinawa area		Aircraft Accidents	Crash landing
Block Island CVE-106	6/15/45	Okinawa	ICEBERG	Collisions	Collision with warship
Santee CVE-29	7/7/45	Okinawa		Aircraft Accidents	Crash landing
Kaiyō CVE	7/18/45	Sada Straights	Training exercise	Mines	Magnetic mine
Amagi CV	7/19/45	Kure	Raids on Home Islands	Air attack	Bombs- carrier aircraft
Admiralty Islands CVE-99	7/20/45	Off Okinawa		Aircraft Accidents	Exploding external fuel tank
Kaiyō CV	7/24/45	Beppu Bay, Japan	Raids on Home Islands	Mines	Magnetic mine
Hōshō CVL	7/24/45	Kure	Raids on Home Islands	Air attack	Bombs- carrier aircraft
Amagi CV	7/24/45	Kure	Raids on Home Islands	Air attack	Bombs- carrier aircraft
Katsuragi CV	7/24/45	Kure	Raids on Home Islands	Air attack	Bombs- carrier aircraft
Kaiyō CVE	7/25/45			Air attack	Rockets- carrier aircraft
Katsuragi CV	7/26/45	Kure	Raids on Home Islands	Air attack	Bombs- carrier aircraft
Amagi CV	7/28/45	Kure	Raids on Home Islands	Air attack	Bombs- carrier aircraft
Kaiyō CVE	7/28/45	Hiji harbor, Beppu Bay	Raids on Home Islands	Air attack	Rockets- carrier aircraft
Hōshō CVL	7/28/45	Kure	Raids on Home Islands	Air attack	Bombs- carrier aircraft
Amagi CV	7/29/45	Kure Harbor, Japan		Air attack	Sunk, Bombs- carrier aircraft
Begum CVE-36/D38/R305	8/4/45	Indian Ocean		Groundings	Grounded
Kaiyō CVE	8/10/45		Raids on Home Islands	Air attack	Sunk, Bombs
Wasp CV-18	8/25/45			Weather	Typhoon

The following table shows the causes of carriers becoming non-operational due to combat-related damage and sinkings.

Carriers damaged or sunk
	USN Ships	RN Ships	IJN Ships	Total Ships	Percent
Bombs	15	5	32	52	22%
Kamikazes	40	8	0	48	20%
Bombs & aerial torpedoes	2	0	5	7	3%
Aerial torpedoes	3	1	0	4	2%
Aerial & submarine attack	1	0	0	1	0%
Air attack	61	14	37	112	47%
Submarine attack	5	7	17	29	12%
Mines	0	1	2	3	1%
Warship gunfire	2	1	0	3	1%
Other Weapon Systems	7	9	19	35	15%
Collision	15	16	0	31	13%
Weather	20	6	2	28	12%
Aircraft Accidents	14	4	0	18	8%
Mechanical failure	0	4	1	5	2%
Groundings	0	3	1	4	2%
Friendly fire	3	0	0	3	1%
Explosions nearby	2	0	0	2	1%
Refueling accidents	1	0	0	1	0%
Other causes	55	33	4	92	38%
All causes	123	56	60	239	100%

=== Carrier non-operational time due to overhauls and refittings ===
The following table shows the amount of time during the war that each carrier spent being overhauled or refitted.

List of carriers
Carrier	Date	Cause	Approximate months Lost
Glorious	1/17/40	Refit	
Furious	Mar-40	Refit	1
Furious	Jun-40	Refit	2
Eagle CV-94	11/1/41	Refit	2
Furious	Nov-41	Refit	8
Hermes	Dec-41	Refit	2
Zuikaku CV	12/30/41	Overhaul	0
Shōkaku CV	2/27/42	Refit	1
Eagle CV-94	3/11/42	Repair	1
Ryūjō CVL	4/28/42	Refit	1
Taiyō CVE	5/21/42	Drydock	0
Indomitable	Jun-42	Refit	1
Dasher CVE BAVG-5/D37	7/2/42	Fire damage during engine trials	1
Zuikaku CV	7/30/42	Drydock	0
Jun'yō CV	8/13/42	Drydock	
Victorious	Sep-42	Refit	2
Illustrious	Oct-42	Refit	2
Victorious	Jan-43	Refit	1
Illustrious	Feb-43	Refit	4
Victorious	Apr-43	Conversion	1
Zuihō CVL	6/7/43	Refit	0
Zuikaku CV	6/11/43	Drydock	0
Enterprise CV-6	7/20/43	Overhaul	4
Furious	Aug-43	Refit	5
Chūyō CVE	8/9/43	refit	0
Ryūhō CVL	9/22/43	Drydock	0
Un'yō CVE	9/30/43	Drydock	
Illustrious	Oct-43	Refit	1
Victorious	Dec-43	Refit	3
Saratoga CV-3	12/9/43	Overhaul	1
Shōkaku CV	12/27/43	Refit	0
Nabob CVE-41/D77	1/1/44	Grounded	1
Formidable	Jan-44	Refit	5
Zuikaku CV	1/8/44	Drydock	0
Taiyō CVE	1/11/44	Drydock	3
Ryūhō CVL	1/17/44	Drydock	0
Zuihō CVL	2/23/44	Refit	1
Kaiyō CVE	2/24/44	Drydock	
Chitose CVL	3/19/44	Drydock	0
Zuikaku CV	3/25/44	Drydock	1.5
Saratoga CV-3	6/2/44	Overhaul	3
Cowpens CV-25	7/1/44	Overhaul	1
Ryūhō CVL	7/11/44	Drydock	0
Zuikaku CV	7/14/44	Drydock	1
Enterprise CV-6	7/16/44	Overhaul	1
Bataan CVL-29	7/30/44	Overhaul	3
Illustrious	Sep-44	Refit	2
Kaiyō CVE	9/6/44	Drydock	0
Jun'yō CV	9/11/44	Refit	0.5
Formidable	Oct-44	Refit	4
Bunker Hill CV-17	10/23/44	Overhaul	3
Victorious	Nov-44	Repair	1
Ranee CVE-46/D03	1/28/45	Damaged helping HMS Nabob refloat	1
Amagi CV	2/10/45	Drydock	0.5
Indomitable	Jun-45	Refit	1
Langley CVL-27	6/3/45	Overhaul	2
Campania	6/5/45	Damage leaving dock	1
Niarana	8/7/45	Damage leaving dry dock	0

== Operational Aircraft carrier time ==
=== Carriers operational at the end of each month ===
(to be completed)

== See also ==
- List of aircraft carriers of World War II
- List of United States Navy escort aircraft carriers
- List of aircraft carriers of the Royal Navy
- List of Japanese Navy ships and war vessels in World War II
- List of aircraft carriers of Germany
