= Fleet carrier =

Type of aircraft carrier

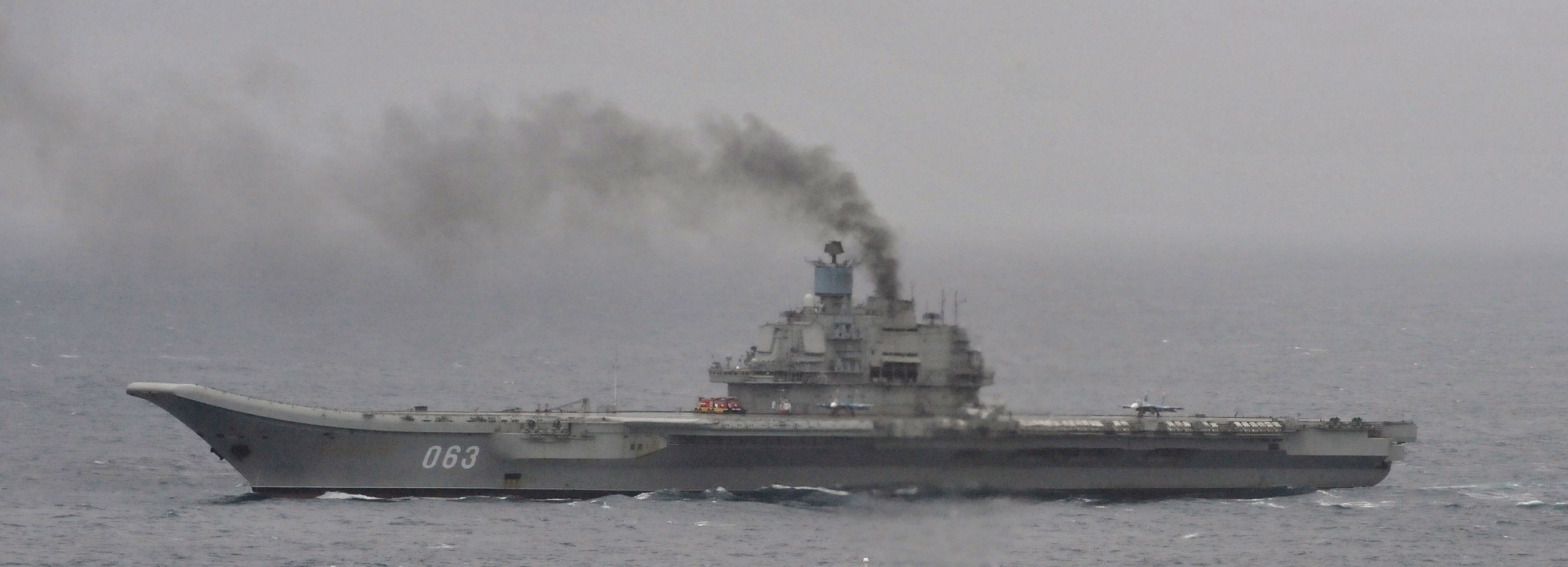
Russian fleet carrier Admiral Kuznetsov

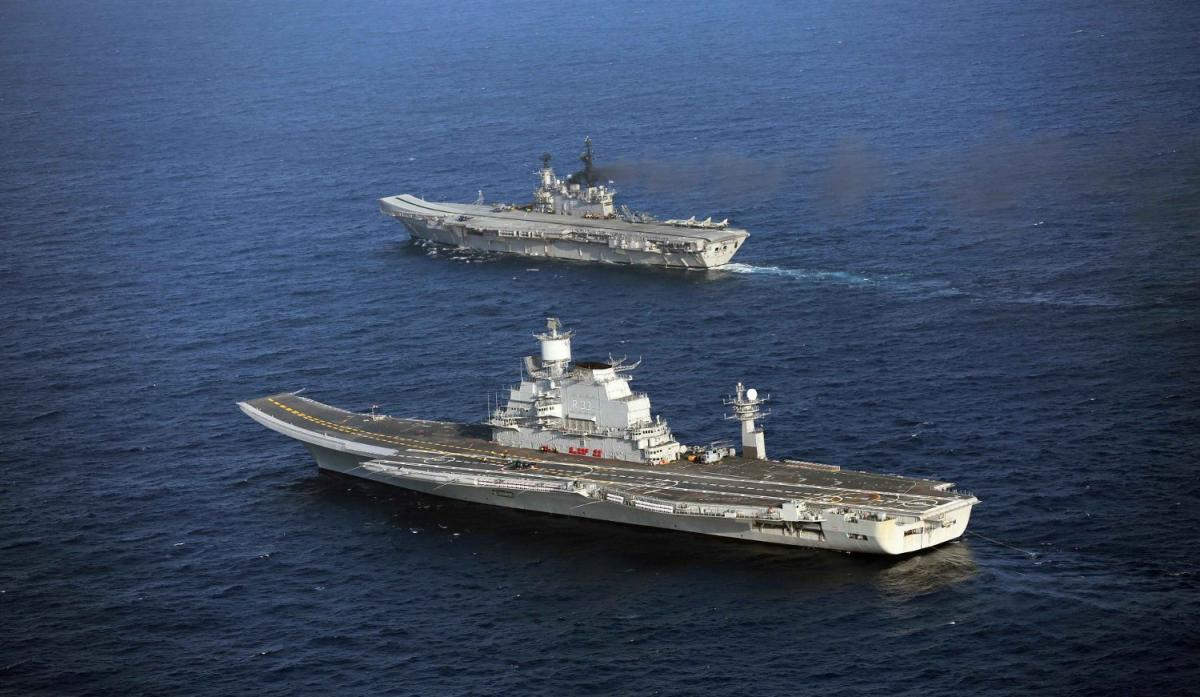
INS Viraat (top), a light carrier, and INS Vikramaditya (bottom), a medium-sized fleet carrier.

A fleet carrier is an aircraft carrier designed to operate with the main fleet of a nation's navy. The term was developed during World War II, to distinguish it from the escort carrier and other less capable types. In addition to many medium-sized carriers and supercarriers, some light carriers are also classed as fleet carriers.

== History ==
Aircraft carriers were designed in the years between World War I and World War II. Flight decks were installed on several different types of ships to explore the possibilities of operating naval aircraft without the performance limitations of flotation devices required for seaplanes and flying boats. The most successful of these early aircraft carriers were built from battlecruisers. Battlecruisers typically had a speed of about 30 knots (56 km/h), which was several knots faster than the speed of contemporary battleships. Additional speed was not necessary for maintaining station with the battle fleet, but enabled the carrier to catch up with the battle fleet after temporarily leaving formation to turn into the wind for launch or recovery of aircraft. The speed of the carrier during launch effectively decreased the takeoff distance for embarked aircraft, so faster carriers could operate heavier aircraft with greater range and superior combat capability. As such naval aircraft became operational, no nation could risk fielding less capable aircraft; so the speed of later purpose-designed aircraft carriers was set by the speed of the converted battle cruisers. The Washington Naval Treaty of 1922 limited the displacement of purpose-designed aircraft carriers to 23,000 tons.

The idea of a modern fleet carrier was developed in 1931 by Admirals J.J. Clark and Harry E. Yarnell of the United States Navy. Fleet carriers, instead of operating as scouts for the fleet, would operate in unison with the fleet, to ward off air attacks and to strike opposing forces from the air. Cruisers and destroyers would protect fleet carriers. The fleet carriers would then displace battleships as the preeminent assets of the surface fleet. A fleet carrier would carry more than 50 aircraft, and be fast enough to keep up with other major elements of the fleet, such as cruisers and battleships.

As combat experience demonstrated the importance of aircraft carriers, numerous ships were rapidly converted to operate aircraft during World War II; and it became important to differentiate ships with the speed and size allowed by the Washington Naval Treaty from ships that were slower and/or carried fewer aircraft. Ships of similar speed carrying fewer aircraft were identified as light aircraft carriers (CVL) and ships of lower speed became known as escort aircraft carriers (CVE). Fleet aircraft carrier became the term to distinguish front-line aircraft carriers from the generic description of any warship carrying aircraft.

In the post-war era, the United States Navy sought to give aircraft carriers a strategic bombing capability in addition to their tactical role. The largest bombs carried by carrier aircraft during the Second World War had been about 2,000 pounds (910 kg) but experience had indicated some hardened targets like submarine pens were impervious to bombs of less than 12,000 pounds (5,400 kg). The fleet carriers of World War II were incapable of operating meaningful numbers of aircraft large enough to carry such heavy bombs over anticipated distances with performance characteristics to avoid defending aircraft. The term fleet carrier then evolved to differentiate the supercarriers designed for strategic bombing roles from the older fleet carriers delegated limited tactical roles like anti-submarine (CVS) or amphibious warfare (LPH).

== Comparison of World War II fleet carriers ==
The following is not an exhaustive list, but does provide context by comparing some examples from three types of fleet carriers active during World War II.

Name	Type	Nation	Displacement	Speed	Aircraft	Reference
Akagi	battlecruiser conversion	Japan	36,500 tons	31 knots	72	
Lexington	battlecruiser conversion	US	36,000 tons	34 knots	88	
Courageous	battlecruiser conversion	UK	22,500 tons	30 knots	42	
Hiryū	Washington Naval Treaty	Japan	17,300 tons	34 knots	64	
Yorktown	Washington Naval Treaty	US	19,800 tons	32 knots	79	
Ark Royal	Washington Naval Treaty	UK	22,000 tons	31 knots	54	
Shōkaku	post-treaty production	Japan	25,675 tons	34 knots	72	
Essex	post-treaty production	US	27,100 tons	33 knots	90	
Illustrious	post-treaty production	UK	23,000 tons	30 knots	33	

== Embarked aircraft ==
The earliest carrier aircraft were designed as fighters, scouts and gunfire observers. Torpedo bombers were developed to slow enemy ships so friendly battleships might catch and sink them. Dive bombing tactics were developed as aircraft strength improved through the 1930s, but limited aircraft capacity encouraged production of dual-purpose fighter-bombers or scout-bombers rather than dedicated dive bombers. Japanese and American fleet carriers usually carried fighter squadrons, torpedo bomber squadrons, and dive bomber squadrons through World War II; but British fleet carriers were less likely to include a dive bomber squadron. The fleet carriers' longer range bombers were often used for the scouting role.

By the time of the Korean War, the typical United States Navy fleet carrier embarked two squadrons of jet fighters, two squadrons of piston fighter-bombers, and a squadron of attack planes. Smaller numbers of specialized aircraft were also carried, including night fighters, night-attack bombers, and planes uniquely modified for aerial reconnaissance, airborne early warning and control (AEW), electronic countermeasures (ECM), and carrier onboard delivery (COD). When the supercarriers became operational, they carried a heavy attack squadron, two light attack squadrons, and two fighter squadrons with similar numbers of specialized aircraft, except the night fighters and bombers. As improved aircraft sensors became available, one or more full squadrons of fighters and bombers became capable of night operations.

Early United States 21st-century fleet carriers typically embarked 45 McDonnell Douglas F/A-18 Hornet aircraft for traditional fighter, attack and ECM roles with twelve Sikorsky SH-60 Seahawk helicopters, four Northrop Grumman E-2 Hawkeye AEW aircraft and two Grumman C-2 Greyhound COD aircraft.

== See also ==
- Escort carrier
- Helicopter carrier
- List of aircraft carriers
- Seaplane tender
