= Evan Mawdsley =

British historian

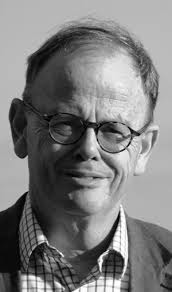
- Born: 1945 (age 80–81); Tunbridge Wells, England
- Education: Haverford College (BA) University of Chicago (MA) University of London School of Slavonic and East European Studies (PhD)
- Occupations: Historian, Writer, Professorial Research Fellow
- Notable work: The War for the Seas: A Maritime History of World War II (Yale University Press, 2019)

Evan Mawdsley (born 1945) is a British historian and former Professor of International History at the University of Glasgow's Department of History. He is currently a Professorial Research Fellow in the university’s School of Humanities. Mawdsley specialises in twentieth century Russian history and the history of World War II.

== Academic career ==
Mawdsley has a BA from Haverford College in Philadelphia, an MA from the University of Chicago, and a PhD from the School of Slavonic and European Studies (SSEES) of the University of London, where he worked under the supervision of Dr J. L. H. Keep.

Mawdsley’s research and teaching have taken in a range of topics. Special Subject courses taught during his teaching career at the University of Glasgow from 1970 to 2010 included, in succession, the Russian Revolution, the early Cold War, and the grand strategy of World War II. His early research and writing focused on the political history of Russia ‘from below’ using newly available Russian sources. His first book (1978) was built on his PhD thesis at SSEES and dealt with the revolutionary movement among the sailors of the Russian Baltic Fleet in 1917-18. His history of the Russian Civil War of 1917-21 (1987, etc) was one of the first Western overviews of the conflict since the two-volume Russian Revolution 1917-1921, published in 1935 by William Henry Chamberlin (also a Haverford College graduate). By the late 1980s and 1990s Mawdsley benefitted from greater archival and published primary sources available in Russia during the Gorbachev and post-Soviet decades. He was able to produce works on both Soviet elites and on the Soviet armed forces. After writing a general book on CPSU Central Committee members (2000) with the late Stephen White, his work moved more into the field of military history and international relations.

Thunder in the East (2005, 2016) was one of the first Western general histories of the Soviet-German war to use the new primary sources now available in Russia. This book was followed by a one-volume history (2009, 2020) of the Second World War as a whole, which attempted a genuinely global perspective. Mawdsley was also general editor of The Cambridge History of the Second World War (2015), a three-volume work involving some eighty historians. His earlier project for a history of the Battle of Moscow evolved into an ‘international’ history of the first twelve days of that December, including the Pearl Harbor attack, the invasion of Malaya, and Hitler’s decision to declare war on the U.S. His argument was that these events were truly pivotal, and they made sense only when all taken together. This book, December 1941 (2011), led to Mawdsley’s more recent work on naval warfare.

The War for the Seas (2019) is a global history of the maritime war from 1939 to 1945. It suggests that the fighting in the Atlantic and the Mediterranean was more important than the fighting in the Pacific for enabling the sea/air defeat of the Axis powers. The War for the Seas was awarded the Anderson Medal of the Society for Nautical Research for the best maritime non-fiction book of 2019.

Mawdsley's next book Supremacy at Sea: Task Force 58 and the Central Pacific Victory (2024) unpacks the elements of American strength in the naval war against Japan: warships, aircraft, ‘fleet train’, personnel, and intelligence. It combines this with the story of the rapid advance of Task Force 58 across the Central Pacific under Admirals Spruance and Mitscher in the first half of 1944. This campaign resulted in the decisive defeat of the Japanese Navy in the Philippine Sea battle of June 1944, and it also marked the moment when the United States overtook Britain as the world’s supreme naval power. In October 2025, Mawdsley was announced as the winner of the 2024 Gilder Lehrman Military History Prize for Supremacy at Sea. The award recognises the best book on American military history in English distinguished by its scholarship, its contribution to the literature, and its appeal to the broadest possible general reading public.

== Works ==
- "The Baltic Fleet and the Kronstadt Mutiny”, Soviet Studies 24:4 (1973), pp. 506–521
- The Russian Revolution and the Baltic Fleet. War and Politics, February 1917—April 1918 (Macmillan, 1978)
- Blue Guide to Moscow and Leningrad (Ernest Benn, 1980) (second edition 1991), with Margaret Mawdsley
- The Russian Civil War (Allen & Unwin, 1987) (later editions 2000, 2008, 2017)
- Computing for Historians: An Introductory Guide (Manchester University Press, 1993), with Thomas Munck
- The Stalin Years: The Soviet Union, 1929–1953 (Manchester University Press, 1998)
- The Soviet Elite from Lenin to Gorbachev: The Central Committee and Its Members, 1917-1991 (Oxford University Press, 2000), with Stephen White
- “The Russian Navy in the Gorshkov Era” in Phillips O’Brien, Technology and Naval Combat in the Twentieth Century and Beyond (Frank Cass, 2001), p. 165-184
- “Crossing the Rubicon: Soviet Plans for Offensive War in 1940-1941”, International History Review, 25:4 (2003), pp. 818–865
- Thunder in the East: The Nazi-Soviet War, 1941-1945 (Bloomsbury, 2005) (second edition 2016)
- “Anti-German Insurgency and Allied Grand Strategy”, Journal of Strategic Studies 31:5 (2008), pp. 695-719
- World War II: A New History (Cambridge University Press, 2009) (second edition 2020)
- December 1941: Twelve Days That Began a World War (Yale University Press, 2011)
- Cambridge History of the Second World War (3 vols, Cambridge University Press, 2015) (General Editor)
- The War for the Seas: A Maritime History of World War II (Yale University Press, 2019)
- Supremacy at Sea: Task Force 58 and the Central Pacific Victory (Yale University Press, 2024)
