= List of aircraft carriers =

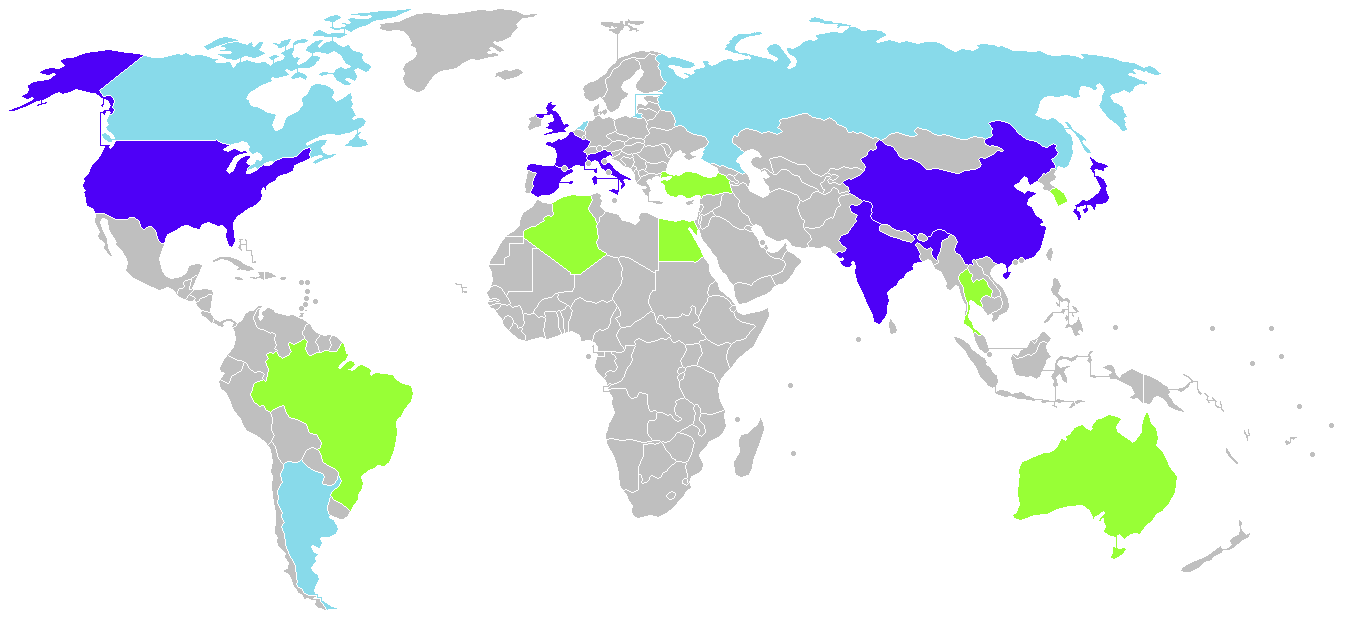
Countries currently operating fixed-wing aircraft carriers (8) Countries currently operating solely helicopter carriers (7) Historical operators of carriers (4)

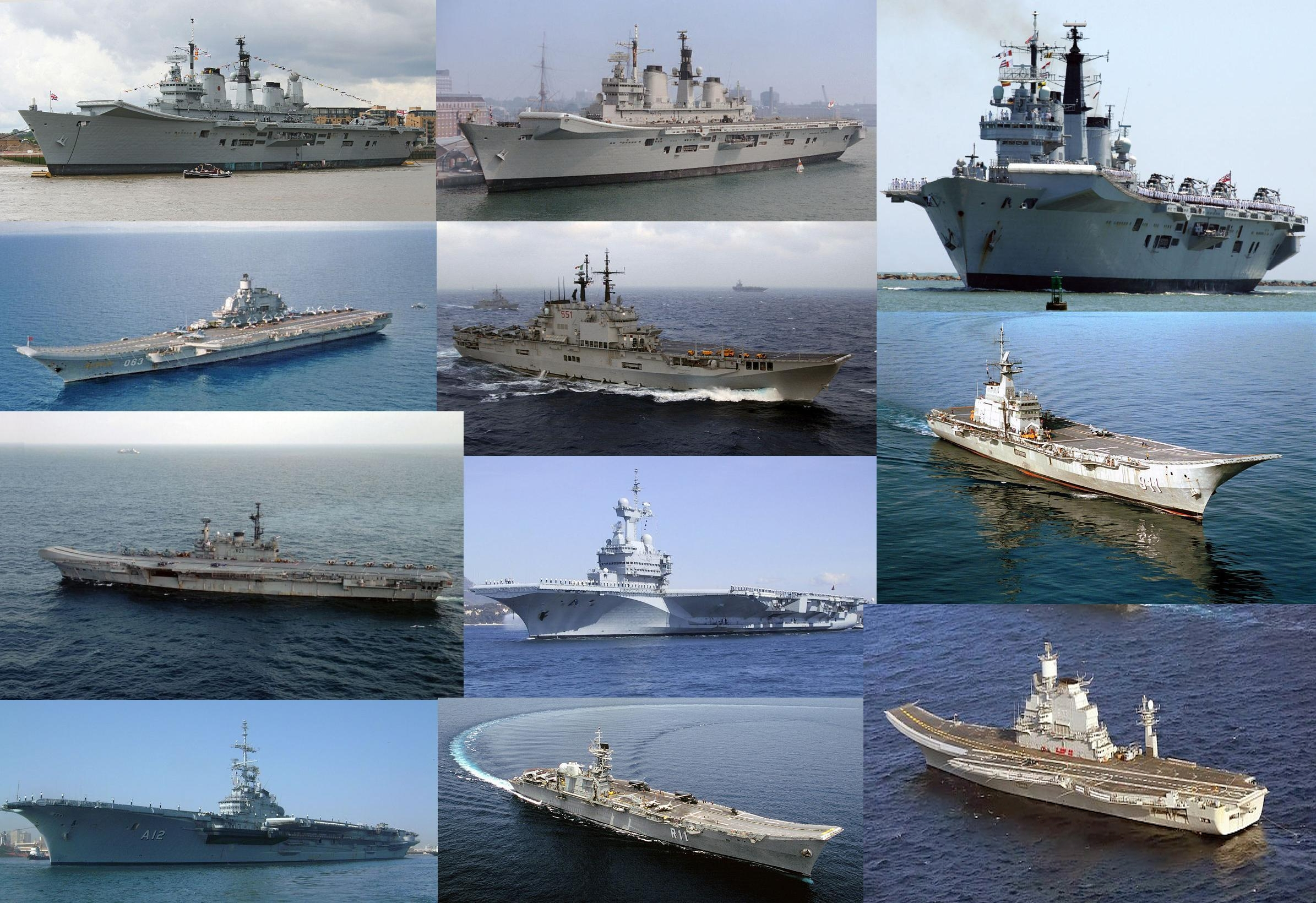
Various aircraft carriers from around the world

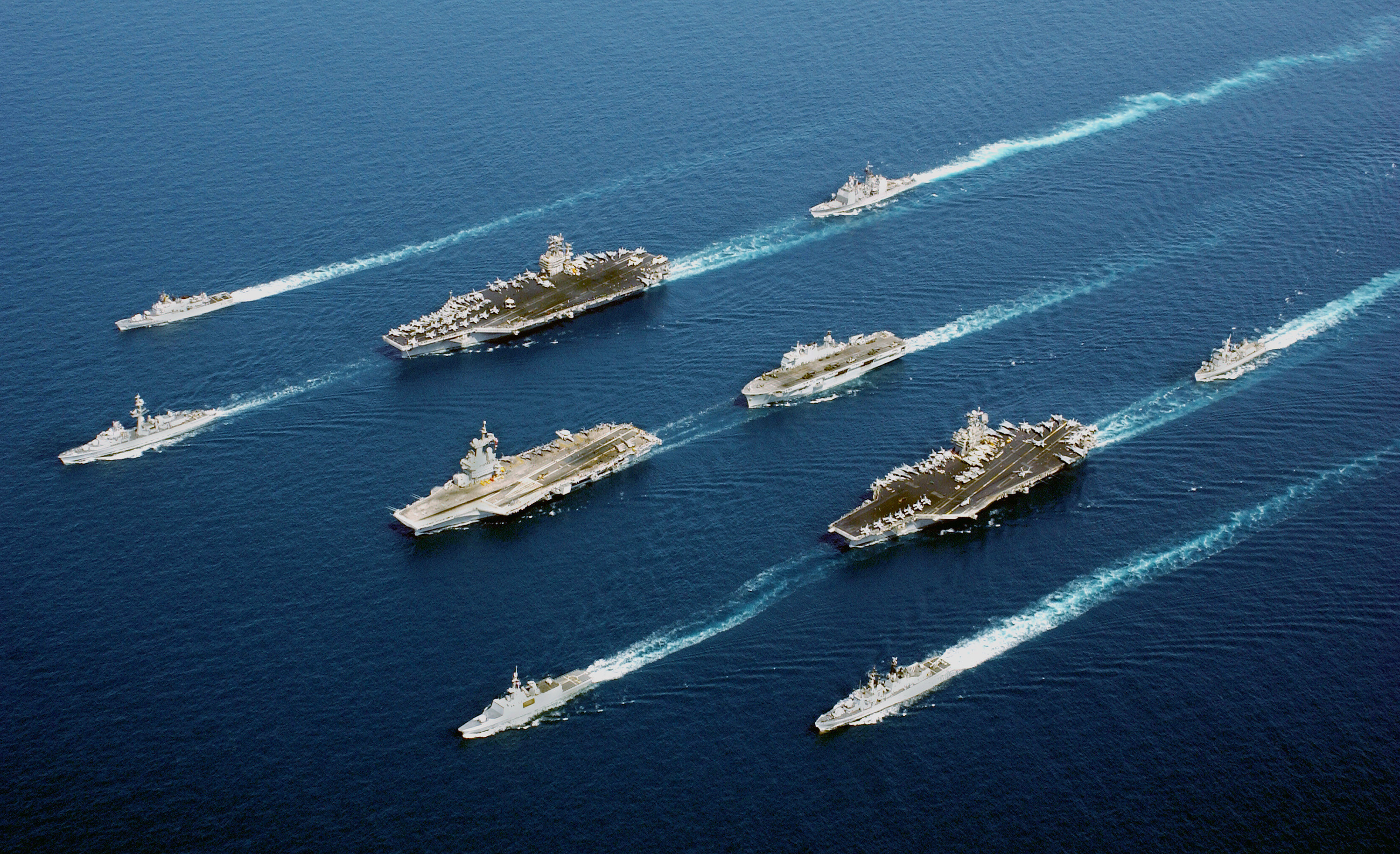
Four modern aircraft carriers of various types; USS John C. Stennis (United States Navy), Charles de Gaulle (French Navy), USS John F. Kennedy (US Navy), HMS Ocean (Royal Navy) and escort vessels, 2002

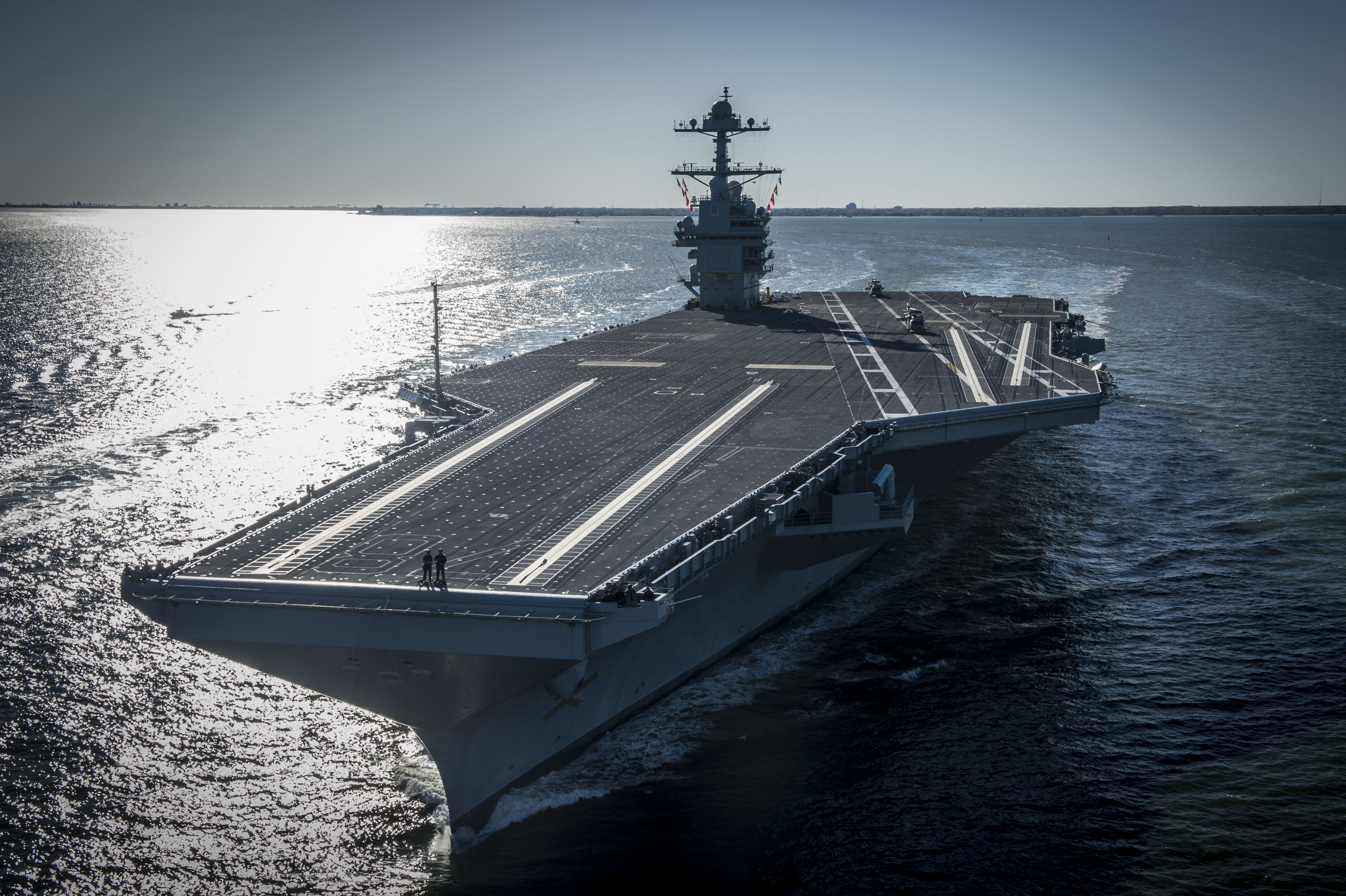
Bow view of the US Navy's USS Gerald R. Ford, lead ship of her class, the largest carrier in the world.

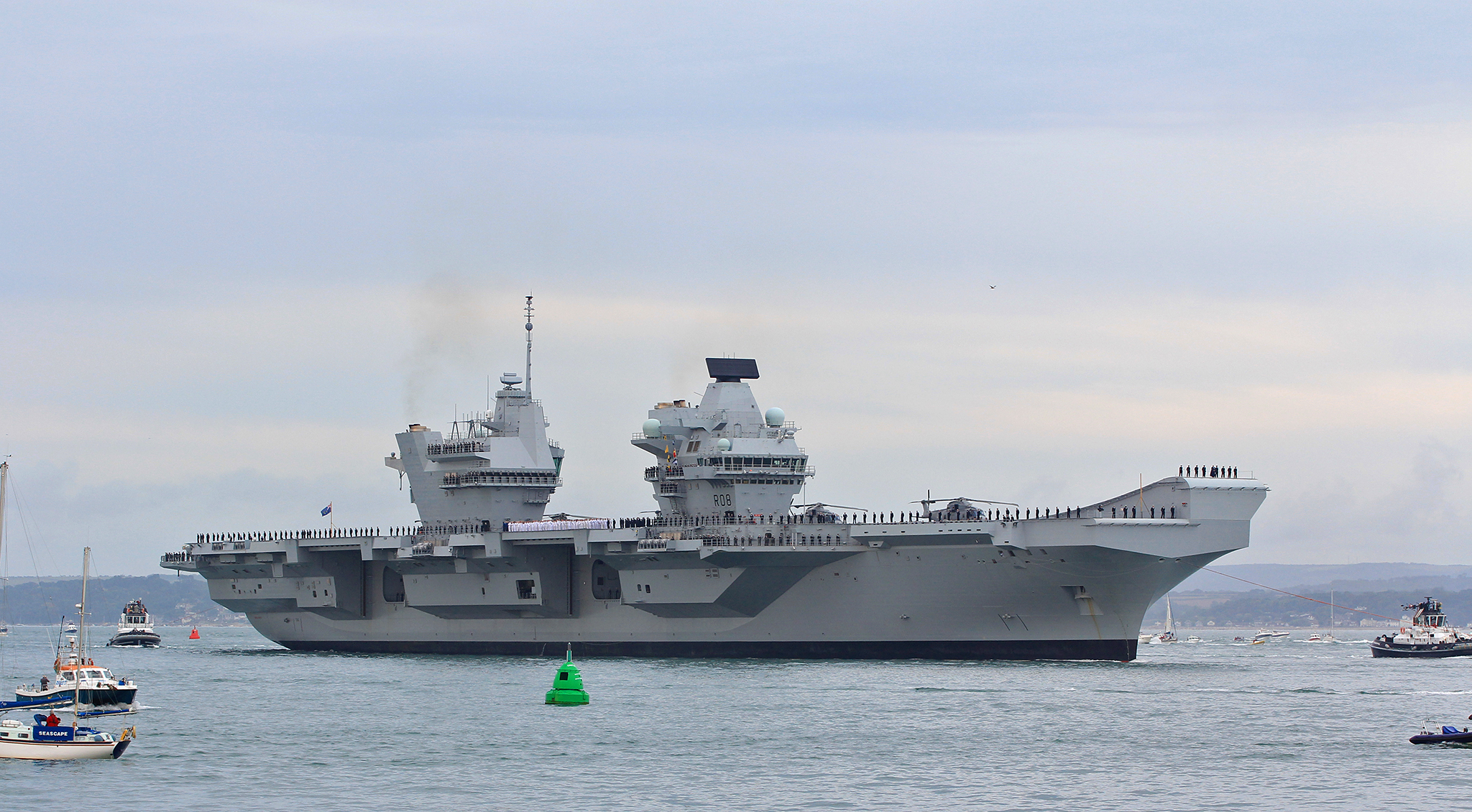
HMS Queen Elizabeth, the second newest aircraft carrier of the Royal Navy. It is one of two Queen Elizabeth-class aircraft carriers.

This list of aircraft carriers contains aircraft carriers listed alphabetically by name. An aircraft carrier is a warship with a full-length flight deck and facilities for carrying, arming, deploying, and recovering aircraft, that serves as a seagoing airbase.

Included in this list are ships which meet the above definition and had an official name (italicized) or designation (non-italicized), regardless of whether they were or were not ordered, laid down, completed, or commissioned.

Not included in this list are the following:

- Aircraft cruisers, also known as aviation cruisers, cruiser-carriers, flight deck cruisers, and hybrid battleship-carriers, which combine the characteristics of aircraft carriers and surface warfare ships, because they primarily operated helicopters or floatplanes and did not act as a floating airbase. Examples include the British Tiger-class cruisers, Japanese Hyūga-class helicopter destroyers, French cruiser Jeanne d'Arc, Soviet Moskva-class helicopter carriers, and Italian Andrea Doria-class cruisers. Vessels which meet the criteria of an aircraft carrier but are named as cruisers (or destroyers, etc.) for political or treaty reasons such as the Russian Kuznetsov-class aircraft carriers or British Invincible-class aircraft carriers are included however.
- Amphibious assault ships, also known as commando carriers, assault carriers, helicopter carriers, landing helicopter assault ships, landing helicopter docks, landing platform docks, and landing platform helicopters. Although they have flight decks and look like aircraft carriers, they primarily operate helicopters and do not act as a floating airbase. Examples include the US Wasp-class assault ships, Brazilian NAM Atlântico (A140), and French Mistral class.
- Landing craft carriers, such as Japanese Akitsu Maru and USS LST-906, which were modified amphibious landing ships, with limited aircraft carrier capabilities.
- Drone carriers
- Catapult aircraft merchantmen, merchant ships which carried cargo and an aircraft catapult (no flight deck).
- Escort carriers, usually converted merchant ships, see separate List of escort carriers by country.
- Merchant aircraft carriers, cargo-carrying merchant ships with a full flight deck.
- Seaplane tenders and seaplane carriers, because they could not land aircraft.
- Submarine aircraft carriers, because they had no flight deck and could not land their aircraft.

"In commission" denotes the period that the ship was officially in commission with the given name for the given country as an aircraft carrier as defined above.

== Numbers of aircraft carriers by country ==
The table below does not include submarine aircraft carriers, seaplane tenders, escort carriers, merchant aircraft carriers, helicopter carriers, or amphibious assault ships. It includes ships under construction, but not ships that never got past the planning stage.

Number of fleet aircraft carriers by operating nation
Country	In service	Inactive	Decommissioned	Under construction	Never completed	Total
Argentina	0	0	2	0	0	2
Australia	0	0	3	0	0	3
Brazil	0	0	2	0	0	2
Canada	0	0	3	0	0	3
China	3	0	0	1	0	4
France	1	0	7	1	8	17
Germany	0	0	0	0	7	7
India	2	0	2	0	0	4
Italy	2	0	1	0	2	5
Japan	2	0	20	0	8	30
Netherlands	0	0	2	0	0	2
Russia	0	1	4	0	2	7
Spain	1	0	2	0	1	4
Turkey	0	0	0	1	0	1
United Kingdom	2	0	38	0	15	55
United States	11	0	55	3	12	81
Total	24	1	141	6	55	227

== List of countries that have operated aircraft carriers ==
=== Argentina ===
Retired:

Light Carriers
Photo	Ship	Class	Serial number	Commission Date	Decommission Date	Fate
ARA Independencia	ARA Independencia (former HMS Warrior)	Colossus	V-1	1959	1969	Scrapped in 1971
Aircraft carrier ARA Veinticinco de Mayo	ARA Veinticinco de Mayo (former HMS Venerable)	Colossus	V-2	1969	1999	Scrapped in 1999

=== Australia ===
Retired:

Light Fleet Carriers
Photo	Ship	Class	Serial number	Commission Date	Decommission Date	Fate
HMAS Sydney docked at port	HMAS Sydney	Majestic	R-17	1948	1958	Recommissioned as a troop transport
HMAS Melbourne and USS Midway (CV-41) underway in 1981	HMAS Melbourne (former HMS Majestic)	Majestic	R-21	1955	1982	Scrapped
HMAS Vengeance with a helicopter in the foreground	HMAS Vengeance (HMS Vengeance on loan from the Royal Navy.)	Colossus	R-71	1952	1955	Given back to the Royal Navy in 1955.

=== Brazil ===
Retired:

Fleet Carrier
Photo	Ship	Class	Serial number	Commission Date	Decommission Date	Fate
Brazilian aircraft carrier São Paulo	São Paulo (former French carrier Foch)	Clemenceau	A-12	2000	2017	Scuttled in 2023.

Light Carrier
Photo	Ship	Class	Serial number	Commission Date	Decommission Date	Fate
Brazilian aircraft carrier Minas Gerais (A-11)	Minas Gerais	Colossus	A-11	1960	2001	Scrapped in 2004

=== Canada ===
Retired:

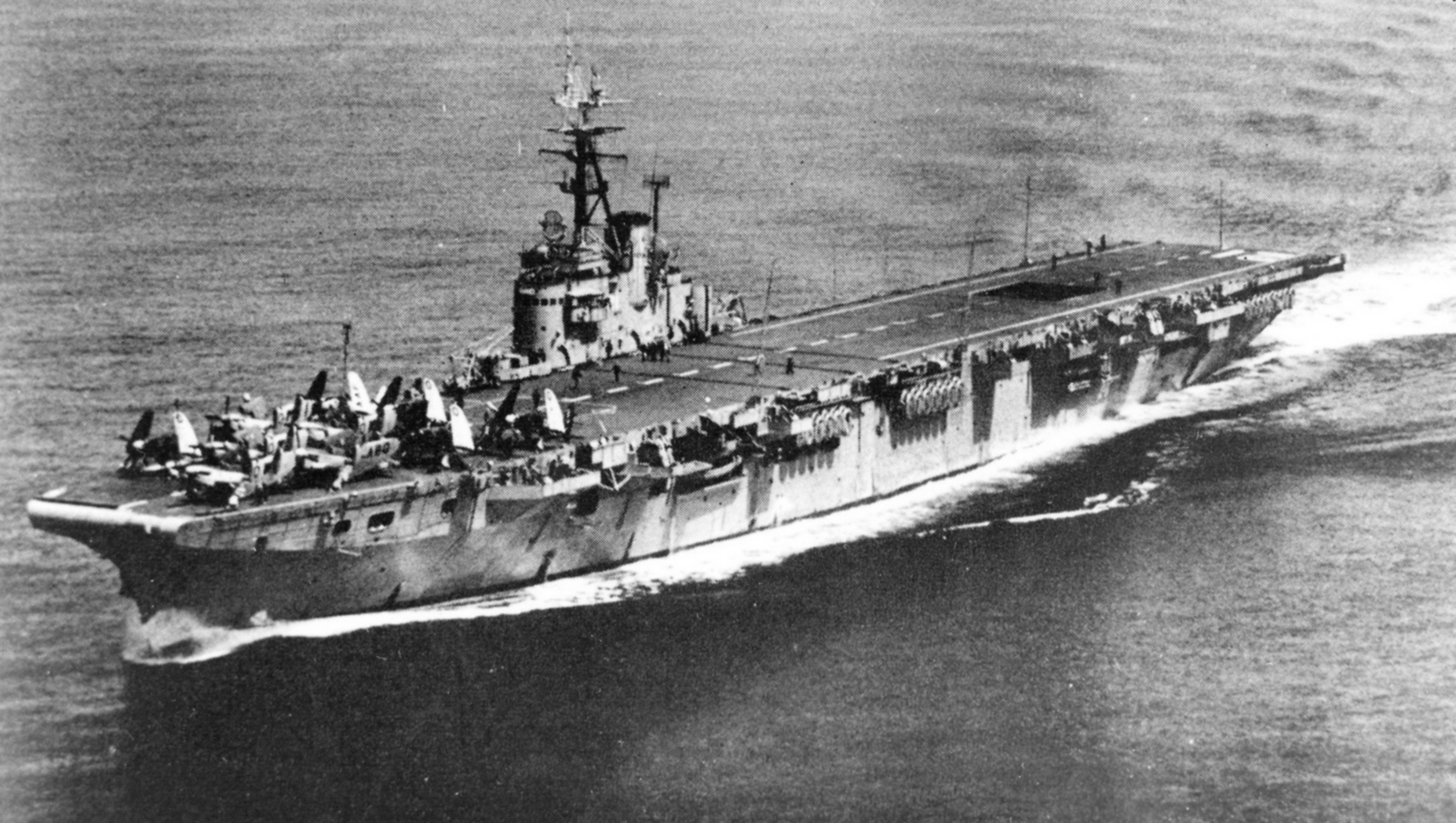
HMCS Magnificent in 1950

Light Carriers
Photo	Ship	Class	Serial number	Commission Date	Decommission Date	Fate
HMCS Warrior in 1947	HMCS Warrior (HMS Warrior on loan to Royal Canadian Navy)	Colossus	R-31	1946	1948	Given back to the Royal Navy in 1948.
TBM-3 flying over HMCS Magnificent	HMCS Magnificent (HMS Magnificent on loan to the Royal Canadian Navy.)	Majestic	None	1946	1956	Given back to the Royal Navy in 1956.
HMCS Bonaventure in 1961	HMCS Bonaventure	Majestic	None	1957	1970	Scrapped in 1971 in Taiwan.

=== China ===
Active:

Photo	Ship	Class	Serial number	Commission Date
Aircraft carrier Liaoning in Hong Kong in 2017	Liaoning (former unfinished Soviet carrier Varyag)	Kuznetsov/Type 001	CV-16	2012
A J-15 fighter jet takes off from the Shandong.	Shandong	Type 002	CV-17	2019
Aircraft carrier Fujian flight deck	Fujian	Type 003	CV-18	2025

Under construction:

- Type 004: a nuclear-powered aircraft carrier under construction.

=== France ===
Active
	Ship	Class	Serial number	Commission Date
Charles de Gaulle (R-91) in 2019	Charles de Gaulle	Charles de Gaulle	R-91	2001

Planned:

- France Libre: a planned nuclear-powered aircraft carrier

Retired
Photo	Ship	Class	Serial number	Commission Date	Decommission Date	Fate
French aircraft carrier Béarn	Béarn	Normandie	5-63	1927	1948	Turned into a floating barracks and scrapped in 1967
Dixmude in 1956	Dixmude (former HMS Biter)	Avenger	None	1945	1951	Sunk as a target in 1966
Arromanches in the Mediterranean, 1961	Arromanches (former HMS Colossus)	Colossus	R-95	1946	1974	Scrapped in 1978
French aircraft carrier La Fayette in Indochina in 1953	La Fayette (former USS Langley)	Independence	R-96	1951	1963	Scrapped in 1964
Bois Belleau in Naval Station Norfolk in 1953	Bois Belleau (former USS Belleau Wood)	Independence	R-97	1953	1960	Scrapped in 1960
Clemenceau off Oman in 1987	Clemenceau	Clemenceau	R-98	1961	1997	Scrapped in 2009
French aircraft carrier Foch underway in 1992	Foch	Clemenceau	R-99	1963	2000	Given to Brazil in 2000 to become the São Paulo, scuttled in 2023

Never completed:

- Engageante: Friponne-class sloop planned for conversion but not completed
- Conquérante: Vaillante-class sloop planned for conversion but not completed
- Joffre class
  - Joffre: carrier construction cancelled in 1940
  - Painlevé: carrier plan cancelled in 1940
- Verdun: attack carrier development cancelled in 1961
- PH 75: projected two nuclear-powered helicopter carrier program during the 1970s
  - Bretagne: STOVL aircraft carrier
  - Provence: STOVL aircraft carrier
- PA 2: modified version of Thales UK/BMT design of the British Queen Elizabeth class (formerly CVF).

=== Germany ===
Never completed:

- German aircraft carrier I: planned conversion of passenger ship from German shipyard to aircraft carrier. Cancelled in 1918.
- Graf Zeppelin: Graf Zeppelin-class carrier. Launched but not completed. Construction work stopped in 1943.
- Flugzeugträger B: Graf Zeppelin-class carrier cancelled partly constructed in 1939.
- Flugzeugträger C: Planned Graf Zeppelin-class carrier cancelled in 1938.
- Flugzeugträger D: Planned Graf Zeppelin-class carrier cancelled in 1938.
- Seydlitz: conversion of partly-built Admiral Hipper-class cruiser. Work stopped in 1943 and not resumed.
- German aircraft carrier I: conversion of the transport ship Europa cancelled at the design stage in November 1942 due to insurmountable problems.
- Jade: Lead ship of the Jade class. Converted from the passenger liner SS Potsdam. Laid down in 1934 but never completed. Sunk on 2 May 1943.
- Elbe: Converted from the passenger liner SS Gneisenau. Laid down in 1934 but never completed. Survived the war but was seized by Great Britain on 20 June 1946.
- German aircraft carrier II: was a proposed conversion project for the incomplete French cruiser De Grasse. The ship was laid down in November 1938 and lay incomplete in the Arsenal de Lorient shipyard when Germany invaded France in May 1940. In 1942, Nazi Germany's Kriegsmarine decided to convert the cruiser into an auxiliary aircraft carrier with a capacity for twenty-three fighters and dive bombers. Work ceased in February 1943, however, due to concerns with the ship's design, a severe shortage of material and labor, and the threat of Allied bombing raids. In 1945, the ship was returned to France and was eventually completed as an anti-aircraft cruiser in 1956 by the French Navy

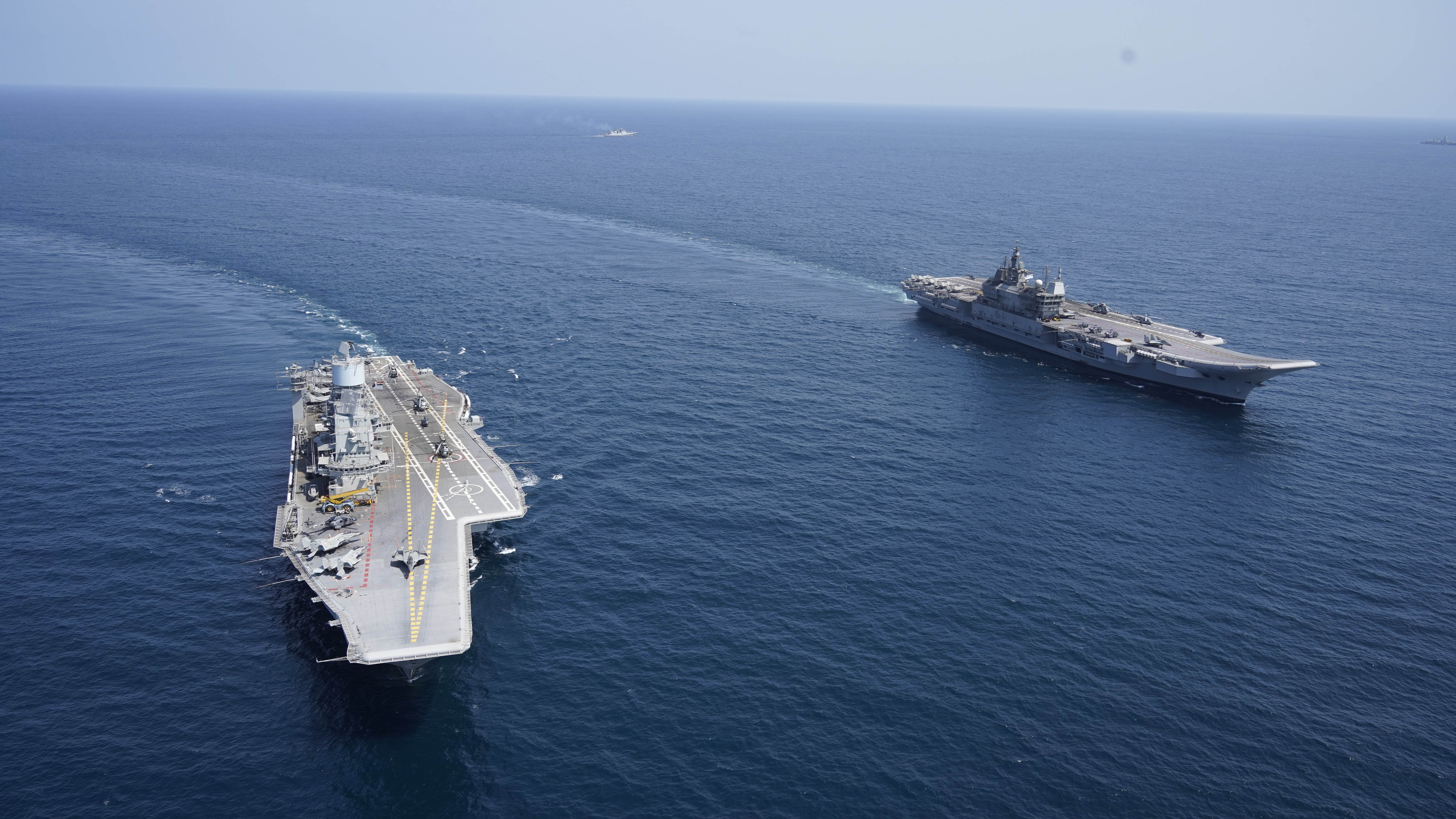
INS Vikrant and INS Vikramaditya in a exercise

=== India ===
Active
Photo	Ship	Class	Serial number	Commission Date
INS Vikramaditya with a Sea Harrier	INS Vikramaditya (former Admiral Gorshkov)	Kiev	R-33	2013
INS Vikrant	INS Vikrant	Vikrant	R-11	2022

Planned:

- INS Vishal: 65,000-ton carrier. Yet to start, planned to enter service in 2030. It will be conventionally powered.

Retired
Photo	Ship	Class	Serial number	Commission Date	Decommission Date	Fate
INS Vikrant in 1984	INS Vikrant (former HMS Hercules)	Majestic	R-49	1961	1997	Scrapped in 2014
INS Viraat in the Bay of Bengal in 2007	INS Viraat (former HMS Hermes)	Centaur	R-22	1987	2017	Scrapped in 2021 in Alang. Longest serving aircraft carrier in the world (58 years).

=== Indonesia ===
Active:

Photo	Ship	Class	Serial number	Commission Date
KRI Sriwijaya	Sriwijaya	Giuseppe Garibaldi	100	2026

=== Italy ===
Active:

Photo	Ship	Class	Serial number	Commission Date
Cavour	Cavour	Cavour	550	2008
Trieste	Trieste	landing helicopter dock Trieste	L9890	2024

Retired
Photo	Ship	Class	Serial number	Commission Date	Decommission Date	Fate
Giuseppe Garibaldi in 2004	Giuseppe Garibaldi	aircraft-carrying cruiser	551	1985	2024	Transferred to Indonesian Navy, 2026

Never completed:

- Sparviero (1927) (converted liner Augustus, not completed as carrier) – Sunk to block Genoa harbour 5 October 1944
- Aquila (1926) (converted liner Roma) – work stopped 1943, sunk 1945. BU 1951–1952

=== Japan ===
Active
Photo	Ship	Class	Serial number	Commission Date
JS Izumo (DDH-183) seen in 2021	JS Izumo	Izumo	DDH-183	2015
JS Kaga (DDH-184)	JS Kaga	Izumo	DDH-184	2017

Retired
Photo	Ship	Class	Commission Date	Decommission Date	Fate
Aircraft carrier Hosho in Tokyo Bay	Hōshō	Hōshō	1922	1947	Scrapped
Jun'yō anchored in Sasebo, Japan in September 1945	Jun'yō	Hiyō	1942	1945	Scrapped
Japanese aircraft carrier Ryūhō	Ryūhō	Hiyō	1942	1945	Scrapped
The Katsuragi in Rabaul, New Guinea in 1946	Katsuragi	Unryū	1944	1946	Scrapped

Sunk: (IJN)

- Kaga (1921) – sunk, Battle of Midway, June 1942
- Amagi class
  - Akagi (1925) – sunk, Battle of Midway, June 1942
- Ryūjō (1931) – sunk, Battle of the Eastern Solomons, August 1942
- Sōryū (1935) – sunk, Battle of Midway, June 1942
- Hiryū (1937) – sunk, Battle of Midway, June 1942
- Zuihō class
  - Shōhō (1935) – sunk, Battle of the Coral Sea, May 1942
  - Zuihō (1936) – sunk, Battle of Leyte Gulf, October 1944
- Chitose class
  - Chitose (1936) – seaplane tender from 1934 to 1942, rebuilt as light carrier; sunk, Battle of Leyte Gulf, October 1944
  - Chiyoda (1937) – sunk, Battle of Leyte Gulf, October 1944
- Shōkaku class
  - Shōkaku (1939) – sunk by U.S. submarine USS Cavalla, Battle of Philippine Sea, June 1944
  - Zuikaku (1939) – sunk, Battle of Leyte Gulf, October 1944
- Hiyō class
  - Hiyō (1939) – sunk, Battle of Philippine Sea, June 1944
- Taihō (1943) – sunk by U.S. submarine USS Albacore, Battle of Philippine Sea, June 1944
- Unryū class
  - Amagi (1943) – used as anti-aircraft platform; sunk in July 1945
  - Unryū (1943) – sunk by U.S. submarine USS Redfish, December 1944
- Shinano (1944) – sunk by U.S. submarine USS Archerfish, November 1944

Hōshō, Jun'yō, Katsuragi, and Ryūhō survived the war. These were scrapped by 1948.

Never completed: (IJN)

- Amagi class
  - Amagi (not completed); damaged beyond economical repair in the Great Kantō earthquake of September 1923, scrapped 1924
- Taihō class
  - 5x Improved Taihō, project G-15 (cancelled 1944)
- Unryū class
  - Hull 5002, 3rd unit of Unryū class (cancelled 1943); materials used for Shinano conversion
  - Kasagi, 5th unit of Unryū class (not completed); dismantled post-war
  - Hull 5005, 6th unit of Unryū class (cancelled 1943); materials used for Shinano conversion
  - Aso, 7th unit of Unryū class (not completed); sunk as weapon test target and scrapped postwar
  - Ikoma, 8th unit of Unryū class (not completed); dismantled post-war
  - Kurama, 9th unit of Unryū class (cancelled 1944)
- Ibuki – heavy cruiser conversion (not completed); dismantled post-war

=== Netherlands ===
Retired
Photo	Ship	Class	Pennant number	Commission Date	Decommission Date	Fate
HNLMS Karel Doorman in 1947	Hr.Ms. Karel Doorman	Nairana	QH1	1946	1948	Returned to the Royal Navy
HNLMS Karel Doorman in 1950	Hr.Ms. Karel Doorman	Colossus	R63	1948	1968	Sold to the Argentine Navy

=== Russia (and USSR) ===
The Russian Navy was reestablished in December 1991, after the dissolution of the Soviet Union (USSR). Most Soviet aircraft carriers were transferred over to Russia (with the exception of Varyag which was transferred to Ukraine. Ulyanovsk was scrapped before the Soviet Union was dissolved).

Inactive:

- Kuznetsov class
  - Admiral Kuznetsov (Russia: 1991–present / USSR: 1985–1991); Undergoing overhaul and repairs since 2017.

Proposed:

- Project 23000 aircraft carrier
- Project 11430E aircraft carrier
- Project 23000KM aircraft carrier

Retired:

- Kiev class
  - Kiev (Russia: 1991–1993, USSR: 1972–1991); converted to a theme park (later hotel) in China
  - Minsk (Russia: 1991–1993, USSR: 1975–1991); converted to a theme park in China
  - Novorossiysk (Russia: 1991–1993, USSR: 1978–1991); scrapped
  - Admiral Gorshkov (Russia: 1991–1995, USSR: 1982–1991); sold to India, modified, rebuilt by India and renamed INS Vikramaditya

Never completed:

- Project 1153 Orel
- Kuznetsov class
  - Varyag (not commissioned) – to Ukraine (1991); rebuilt, tested and commissioned by the Chinese PLAN as Liaoning
- Ulyanovsk class
  - Ulyanovsk (not commissioned) – scrapped (1991)

=== Spain ===
Active:

Photo	Ship	Class	Serial number	Commission Date
Juan Carlos I in 2023	Juan Carlos I	Juan Carlos I	L61	2010

Retired:

Photo	Ship	Class	Serial number	Commission Date	Decommission Date	Fate
Dédalo in 1988	Dédalo	Independence	R01	1976	1989	2002
Príncipe de Asturias in 1992	Príncipe de Asturias	Príncipe de Asturias	R-11	1988	2013	2017

Never completed:

- Spanish conversion for refloated Italian heavy cruiser Trieste, cancelled in 1951.

=== Thailand ===
Role changed:

- HTMS Chakri Naruebet (1996)* Commissioned in 1997, but by 1999, only one used AV-8S Matador/Harrier was still operable due to lack of spare parts and age. Since 2006 is solely operated as a helicopter carrier.

=== Turkey ===
Active:

Under construction:

- MUGEM-class aircraft carrier

=== United Kingdom ===
Active:

- Queen Elizabeth-class aircraft carrier, STOVL ship of 80,600 tonnes
  - HMS Queen Elizabeth
  - HMS Prince of Wales

Retired:

- HMS Argus (1916) – scrapped 1946
- HMS Furious (1916) – decommissioned 1945
- HMS Vindictive (1918) – converted to aircraft carrying cruiser 1925, sold for scrap 1946
- HMS Unicorn fleet maintenance carrier (1943) – sold for scrap 1959
- Illustrious class
  - HMS Illustrious (1939)
  - HMS Formidable (1939)
  - HMS Victorious (1939)
- HMS Indomitable (1940)
- Implacable class
  - HMS Implacable (1942)
  - HMS Indefatigable (1942)
- Audacious class
  - HMS Eagle (ex-Audacious) (1946) – decommissioned 1972
  - HMS Ark Royal (ex-Irresistible) (1950) – decommissioned 1979
- Colossus class
  - HMS Colossus (1943), to France 1946 as Arromanches
  - HMS Glory (1943)
  - HMS Ocean (1944)
  - HMS Theseus (1944)
  - HMS Triumph (1944)
  - HMS Venerable (1944) – to Netherlands 1948 as HNLMS Karel Doorman, to Argentina 1968 as ARA Veinticinco de Mayo
  - HMS Vengeance (1944) – to Brazil 1956 as Minas Gerais
  - HMS Warrior (1944) – to Canada 1946–1948, to Argentina 1958 as ARA Independencia
  - HMS Perseus (1944)
  - HMS Pioneer (1944)
- Majestic class
  - HMS Majestic (1945) – to Australia 1955 as HMAS Melbourne
  - HMS Hercules (1945) – to India 1957 as INS Vikrant
  - HMS Magnificent (1944) – sold to Canada as HMCS Magnificent
  - HMS Powerful (1945) – to Canada 1952 as HMCS Bonaventure
  - HMS Terrible (1944) – to Australia in 1948 as HMAS Sydney
- Centaur class
  - HMS Centaur (1947)
  - HMS Albion (1947)
  - HMS Bulwark (1948)
  - HMS Hermes (ex-Elephant) (1953), to India 1986 as INS Viraat
- Invincible class
  - HMS Invincible (1977)
  - HMS Illustrious (1982)
  - HMS Ark Royal (1985)

Sunk:

- Glorious class
  - HMS Glorious (1916), sunk by Scharnhorst and Gneisenau 8 June 1940
  - HMS Courageous (1916), sunk by U-29 17 September 1939
- HMS Eagle (1918), sunk by U-73 11 August 1942
- HMS Hermes (1923) – first purpose-designed aircraft carrier, sunk by Japanese aircraft 9 April 1942
- HMS Ark Royal (1938), sunk 14 November 1941 after being torpedoed by U-81 on 13 November 1941

Never completed:

- Audacious class
  - Eagle – cancelled 1946
  - Africa – to Malta class then cancelled
- Majestic class
  - HMS Leviathan (1945) – was never completed
- Centaur class – second batch of four cancelled
  - Hermes – cancelled
  - Arrogant – cancelled
  - Monmouth – cancelled
  - Polyphemus – cancelled
- Malta class – ordered 1943, not laid down, cancelled 1945
  - Malta
  - New Zealand
  - Gibraltar
  - Africa
- CVA-01 – cancelled 1966
  - Initial four ships planned, reduced to two (likely to have been named Queen Elizabeth and Duke of Edinburgh), reduced to one ship in 1963. No building started.

=== United States ===
The United States Navy is a blue-water navy that is the world's largest navy by tonnage and has the world's largest fleet of nuclear powered aircraft carriers. The carrier fleet currently comprises the (CATOBAR) Nimitz-class and (CATOBAR/ EMALS) Gerald R. Ford-class supercarriers. These carriers serve as the centerpieces and flagships for the Navy's Carrier Strike Groups, with their embarked carrier air wings and accompanying ships and submarines, which strongly contribute to the US ability to project force around the globe. The following is a complete list of all the US Navy's carriers and classes to date, and their status:

Active

- Nimitz class
  - USS Nimitz
  - USS Dwight D. Eisenhower
  - USS Carl Vinson
  - USS Theodore Roosevelt
  - USS Abraham Lincoln
  - USS George Washington
  - USS John C. Stennis
  - USS Harry S. Truman
  - USS Ronald Reagan
  - USS George H.W. Bush
- Gerald R. Ford class
  - USS Gerald R. Ford

Under construction

- Gerald R. Ford class
  - USS John F. Kennedy
  - USS Enterprise
  - USS Doris Miller

Planned

- Gerald R. Ford class
  - USS William J. Clinton
  - USS George W. Bush
  - CVN-84 (planned)
  - CVN-85 (planned)
  - CVN-86 (planned)
  - CVN-87 (planned)

Reserve

- (none currently in reserve)

Retired (preserved as museum ships)

- Essex class
  - USS Yorktown – (Charleston, South Carolina)
  - USS Intrepid – (New York City, New York)
  - USS Hornet – (Alameda, California)
  - USS Lexington – (Corpus Christi, Texas)
- Midway class
  - USS Midway – (San Diego, California)

Retired (other)

- Kitty Hawk class
  - USS John F. Kennedy – (awaiting dismantling)
- Enterprise-class
  - USS Enterprise – (awaiting dismantling)

Retired (scrapped)

- Ranger class
  - USS Ranger
- Yorktown class
  - USS Enterprise
- Essex class (‡ extended bow)
  - USS Essex
  - USS Franklin
  - USS Ticonderoga ‡
  - USS Randolph ‡
  - USS Bunker Hill
  - USS Wasp
  - USS Hancock ‡
  - USS Bennington
  - USS Boxer ‡
  - USS Bon Homme Richard
  - USS Leyte ‡
  - USS Kearsarge ‡
  - USS Antietam ‡
  - USS Princeton ‡
  - USS Shangri-La ‡
  - USS Lake Champlain ‡
  - USS Tarawa ‡
  - USS Valley Forge ‡
  - USS Philippine Sea ‡
- Independence class
  - USS Belleau Wood
  - USS Cowpens
  - USS Monterey
  - USS Langley
  - USS Cabot
  - USS Bataan
  - USS San Jacinto
- Midway class
  - USS Franklin D. Roosevelt
  - USS Coral Sea
- Saipan class
  - USS Saipan
  - USS Wright
- Forrestal class
  - USS Forrestal
  - USS Saratoga
  - USS Ranger
  - USS Independence
- Kitty Hawk class
  - USS Kitty Hawk
  - USS Constellation

Retired (scuttled)

- Lexington class
  - USS Saratoga – scuttled as part of Operation Crossroads, 1946
- Independence class
  - USS Independence – scuttled on 29 January 1951 after nuclear weapons testing in 1946
- Essex class
  - USS Oriskany (extended bow) – scuttled as artificial reef on 17 May 2006
- Kitty Hawk class
  - USS America – scuttled on 14 May 2005 after live-fire testing

Sunk

- Langley class
  - USS Langley – scuttled after Japanese air attack off Java coast, 27 February 1942
- Lexington class
  - USS Lexington – sunk, Battle of the Coral Sea, May 1942
- Yorktown class
  - USS Yorktown – sunk, Battle of Midway, June 1942
  - USS Hornet – sunk, Battle of the Santa Cruz Islands, October 1942
- Wasp class
  - USS Wasp – scuttled after attack by the Japanese submarine I-19, 15 September 1942
- Independence class
  - USS Princeton – sunk, Battle of Leyte Gulf, October 1944

Cancelled before completion

- Essex class (‡ extended bow)
  - USS Reprisal ‡
  - USS Iwo Jima ‡
  - No name assigned (CV-50)
  - No name assigned (CV-51)
  - No name assigned (CV-52)
  - No name assigned (CV-53)
  - No name assigned (CV-54)
  - No name assigned (CV-55)
- Midway class
  - No name assigned (CV-44)
  - No name assigned (CVB-56)
  - No name assigned (CVB-57)
- United States class
  - USS United States

Escort aircraft carrier

The United States Navy also had a sizable fleet of escort aircraft carriers during World War II and the era that followed. These ships were both quicker and cheaper to build than larger fleet carriers and were built in great numbers to serve as a stop-gap measure when fleet carriers were too few. However, they were usually too slow to keep up with naval task forces and would typically be assigned to amphibious operations, often seen in the Pacific War's island hopping campaign, or to convoy protection in the war in the Atlantic. To that end, many of these ships were transferred to the Royal Navy as part of the US-UK lend-lease program. While some of these ships were kept for a time in reserve after the war, none survive today, as they have all since been sunk or retired and scrapped. The following are the classes and stand-alone ships of the US Navy's escort carriers;

- Bogue class (45 ships, 33 went to the RN)
- Sangamon class (4 ships)
- Casablanca class (50 ships)
- Commencement Bay class (19 ships went into service, 4 were cancelled)
- Stand-alone ships;
  - No USN name given (AVG-1/BAVG-1) – went to the RN as HMS Archer (D78)
  - No USN name given (AVG-2/BAVG-2) – went to the RN as HMS Avenger (D14)
  - No USN name given (AVG-3/BAVG-3) – went to the RN as HMS Biter (D97), then later to the French Navy as Dixmude
  - No USN name given (AVG-4/BAVG-4) – went to the RN as HMS Charger (D27), later returned to USN as USS Charger (CVE-30)
  - No USN name given (AVG-5/BAVG-5) – went to the RN as HMS Dasher (D37)
  - No USN name given (BAVG-6) – went to the RN as HMS Tracker (D24)
  - USS Long Island

Amphibious assault ship

The United States Navy also has several full-deck, amphibious assault ships, which are larger than many of the aircraft carriers of other navies today. These ships are STOVL-capable and can carry full squadrons of fixed-wing aircraft, such as the V/STOL AV-8B Harrier II and the STOVL F-35 Lightning II, along with numerous rotary-wing aircraft. Their primary purpose though, is usually to serve as the centerpiece and flagship for an Expeditionary Strike Group or Amphibious Ready Group, carrying US Marine Corps Expeditionary Units and their equipment close to shore for amphibious landings and departures. The following are ships and classes of US Navy amphibious assault ships;

Active

- Wasp-class amphibious assault ship (LHD) (843 ft, 40,500 tons)
  - USS Wasp
  - USS Essex
  - USS Kearsarge
  - USS Boxer
  - USS Bataan
  - USS Iwo Jima
  - USS Makin Island
- America-class amphibious assault ship (LHA) (844 ft, 45,000 tons)
  - USS America
  - USS Tripoli

Under construction

- America-class amphibious assault ship
  - USS Bougainville
  - USS Fallujah

Planned

- America-class amphibious assault ship (11 total)
  - USS Helmand Province (ordered)
  - LHA-11 (planned)
  - LHA-12 (planned)
  - LHA-13 (planned)
  - LHA-14 (planned)
  - LHA-15 (planned)
  - LHA-16 (planned)

Retired

- Wasp-class amphibious assault ship
  - USS Bonhomme Richard
- Tarawa-class amphibious assault ship (LHA)
  - USS Tarawa – (On donation hold)
  - USS Saipan
  - USS Belleau Wood
  - USS Nassau – (On donation hold)
  - USS Peleliu – (In Reserve)
- Iwo Jima-class amphibious assault ship (LPH)
  - USS Iwo Jima
  - USS Okinawa
  - USS Guadalcanal
  - USS Guam
  - USS Tripoli – (Converted to missile trial platform with the National Defense Reserve Fleet in 2006, scrapped in 2018)
  - USS New Orleans
  - USS Inchon
- Stand-alone amphibious assault ships (all LPH, numbered in with the Iwo Jima class);
  - USS Block Island – (converted Commencement Bay-class escort carrier)
  - USS Boxer – (converted Essex-class aircraft carrier)
  - USS Princeton – (converted Essex-class aircraft carrier)
  - USS Thetis Bay – (converted Casablanca-class escort carrier)
  - USS Valley Forge – (converted Essex-class aircraft carrier)

== List of all aircraft carriers ==
Name	Service	Pennant or hull #	Class	Type	Flight operation	In commission	Notes
Abraham Lincoln	US Navy	CVN-72	Nimitz	Supercarrier (Note: Nuclear-powered.)	CATOBAR	1989–present	
Acavus	British Merchant Navy	MAC 1	Rapana	Merchant aircraft carrier		1943–1946	(Note: Converted oil tanker with deck but no hangar or lifts, active as merchant ship. Aircraft stored on deck.) Returned to commercial service.
Activity	Royal Navy	D94		Escort carrier		1942–1945	Converted freighter.
Admiral Flota Sovetskogo Soyuza Gorshkov	Russian Navy; Soviet Navy	111	Kiev	Fleet carrier	VTOL	1987–1996	Also known as Admiral of the Fleet of the Soviet Union Gorshkov, Admiral Gorshkov, or just Gorshkov. Before 1991, it was named Baku. To India as Vikramaditya 2004.
Admiral Flota Sovetskogo Soyuza Kuznetsov	Russian Navy; Soviet Navy	063/113	Kuznetsov	Fleet carrier	STOBAR	1991–present	Also known as Admiral of the Fleet of the Soviet Union Kuznetsov, Admiral Kuznetsov, or just Kuznetsov. Ex-Tbilisi.
Admiralty Islands	US Navy	CVE-99	Casablanca	Escort carrier	CATOBAR	1944–1946	ex-Chapin Bay.
Adula	British Merchant Navy	MAC 2	Rapana	Merchant aircraft carrier		1944–1946	Returned to commercial service.
Africa	Royal Navy		Audacious/Malta	Fleet carrier	CATOBAR	—N/a	Audacious-class carrier ordered 1943, changed to Malta-class carrier 1944, cancelled 1945.
Akagi	Japanese Navy		Amagi	Fleet carrier	STOBAR	1927–1942	Converted Amagi-class battlecruiser, Sunk 4 June 1942 at Midway
Alava Bay	US Navy	CVE-103	Casablanca	Escort carrier	CATOBAR	—N/a	Renamed Roi 1943 before construction began.
Alazon Bay	US Navy	CVE-55	Casablanca	Escort carrier	CATOBAR	—N/a	Renamed Casablanca 1943 after construction began.
Alazon Bay	US Navy	CVE-94	Casablanca	Escort carrier	CATOBAR	—N/a	Renamed Lunga Point 1943 before construction began.
Albion	Royal Navy	R07	Centaur	Fleet carrier	CATOBAR	1954–1962	Converted to commando carrier.
Alexia	British Merchant Navy	MAC 3	Rapana	Merchant aircraft carrier		1943–1945	Returned to commercial service
Alikula Bay	US Navy	CVE-57	Casablanca	Escort carrier	CATOBAR	—N/a	Renamed Coral Sea before launch.
Alikula Bay	US Navy	CVE-95	Casablanca	Escort carrier	CATOBAR	—N/a	Renamed Bismarck Sea 1944 after launch.
Altamaha	US Navy	CVE-6	Bogue	Escort carrier		1942–1942	(Note: Transferred to the United Kingdom under the Lend Lease program. Returned to the US after World War II ended.) Became HMS Battler.
Altamaha	US Navy	CVE-18	Bogue	Escort carrier		1942–1946	
Amagi	Japanese Navy		Amagi	Fleet carrier	STOBAR	—N/a	1920–22 conversion from battlecruiser never completed.
Amagi	Japanese Navy		Unryū	Light fleet carrier	STOBAR	1944–1945	Sunk 29 July 1945 by aircraft
Amastra	British Merchant Navy	MAC 4	Rapana	Merchant aircraft carrier		1943–1946	Returned to commercial service
Ameer	US Navy	AVG-55	Casablanca	Escort carrier	CATOBAR	—N/a	Renamed Alazon Bay 1943 after construction began.
Ameer	Royal Navy	D01	Ruler	Escort carrier		1943–1946	(Note: Transferred from the United States under the Lend Lease program. Returned to the US after World War II ended.) Ex-USS Baffins.
America	US Navy	CV-66	Kitty Hawk	Supercarrier	CATOBAR	1965–1996	
Ancylus	British Merchant Navy	MAC 5	Rapana	Merchant aircraft carrier		1943–1946	Returned to commercial service
Andrea Doria	Italian Navy	550		Aircraft carrier		—N/a	Renamed Cavour before construction began.
Anguilla Bay	US Navy	CVE-96	Casablanca	Escort carrier	CATOBAR	—N/a	Renamed Salamaua 1943 before construction began.
Antietam	US Navy	CV-36	Essex	Fleet carrier	CATOBAR	1945–1963	1st carrier modified with angled flight deck, 1952.
Anzio	US Navy	CVE-57	Casablanca	Escort carrier	CATOBAR	1944–1946	Ex-USS Coral Sea, renamed to reuse name for CV-43.
Aquila	Italian Navy			Fleet carrier		—N/a	1941–1943 conversion from passenger liner never completed.
Arbiter	Royal Navy	D31	Ruler	Escort carrier		1943–1946	Ex-USS St. Simon.
Archer	US Navy	BAVG-1	Long Island	Escort carrier		—N/a	Converted cargo ship. Became HMS Archer.
Archer	Royal Navy	D78	Long Island	Escort carrier		1941–1943	Ex-USS Archer.
Argus	Royal Navy	I49		Fleet carrier		1918–1929	Converted ocean liner.
Ark Royal	Royal Navy	91		Fleet carrier		1939–1941	Sunk by U-81 on 13 November 1941
Ark Royal	Royal Navy	R09	Audacious	Fleet carrier	CATOBAR	1955–1978	Ex-Irresistible. First carrier commissioned with angled deck.
Ark Royal	Royal Navy	R07	Invincible	Aircraft carrier	STOVL	1985–2011	Ex-Indomitable.
Arrogant	Royal Navy		Centaur	Light carrier	CATOBAR	—N/a	Laid down 1944, never completed.
Arromanches	French Navy	R95	Colossus	Light fleet carrier	CATOBAR	1946–1974	Ex-HMS Colossus, loaned (later sold) to France
Aso	Japanese Navy		Unryū	Light fleet carrier	STOBAR	—N/a	Launched in 1944, never completed.
Astrolabe Bay	US Navy	CVE-60	Casablanca	Escort carrier	CATOBAR	—N/a	Renamed Guadalcanal 1943 before launch.
Astrolabe Bay	US Navy	CVE-97	Casablanca	Escort carrier	CATOBAR	—N/a	Renamed Hollandia 1944 after launch.
Atheling	Royal Navy	D51	Ruler	Escort carrier		1943–1946	Ex-USS Glacier.
Attacker	Royal Navy	D02	Attacker	Escort carrier		1942–1946	Ex-USS Barnes.
Attu	US Navy	CVE-102	Casablanca	Escort carrier	CATOBAR	1944–1946	Ex-Elbour Bay.
Audacious	Royal Navy	R05	Audacious	Fleet carrier	CATOBAR	1951–1972	Renamed Eagle 1946 while under construction.
Audacity	Royal Navy	D10		Escort carrier		1941–1941	Converted merchant ship, sunk by U-751
Auguilla Bay	US Navy	CVE-58	Casablanca	Escort carrier	CATOBAR	—N/a	Renamed Corregidor1943 before launch.
Avenger	US Navy	BAVG-1	Avenger	Escort carrier		—N/a	Became HMS Avenger.
Avenger	Royal Navy	D14	Avenger	Escort carrier		1942–1942	(Note: Transferred from the United States under the Lend Lease program.) Sunk 15 November 1942 by U-155.
Badoeng Strait	US Navy	CVE-116	Commencement Bay	Escort carrier		1945–1957	Ex-San Alberto Bay.
Baffins	US Navy	CVE-35	Bogue	Escort carrier		1943–1943	Became HMS Ameer.
Bairoko	US Navy	CVE-115	Commencement Bay	Escort carrier		1945–1955	Ex-Portage Bay.
Baku	Soviet Navy	103	Kiev	Aircraft cruiser	VTOL	1987–1991	Renamed to Admiral Flota Sovetskogo Soyuza Gorshkov in 1991.
Balinas	US Navy	CVE-36	Bogue	Escort carrier		—N/a	Renamed Bolinas after launch because of misspelling.
Barnes	US Navy	CVE-7	Bogue	Escort carrier		1942–1942	Became HMS Attacker.
Barnes	US Navy	CVE-20	Bogue	Escort carrier		1942–1946	
Bastian	US Navy	CVE-37	Bogue	Escort carrier		1942–1942	Became HMS Trumpeter.
Bastogne	US Navy	CVE-124	Commencement Bay	Escort carrier		—N/a	Laid down 1945, cancelled before launch
Bataan	US Navy	CVL-29	Independence	Light carrier		1943–1954	
Battler	Royal Navy	D18	Attacker	Escort carrier		1942–1946	Ex-USS Altamaha.
BAVG-5	US Navy	BAVG-5	Charger	Escort carrier		—N/a	Became HMS Dasher.
Béarn	French Navy			Fleet carrier		1927–1948	Converted battleship.
Begum	Royal Navy	D38	Ruler	Escort carrier		1944–1946	Ex-USS Bolinas.
Belleau Wood	US Navy	CVL-24	Independence	Light carrier		1943–1947	To France as Bois Belleau
Bennington	US Navy	CV-20	Essex	Fleet carrier	CATOBAR	1944–1970	
Bismarck Sea	US Navy	CVE-95	Casablanca	Escort carrier	CATOBAR	1944–1945	Ex-Alikula Bay. Sunk 21 February 1945 by kamikaze attack off Iwo Jima
Biter	US Navy	BAVG-23	Avenger	Escort carrier		—N/a	Became HMS Biter.
Biter	Royal Navy	D97	Avenger	Escort carrier		1940–1945	To France as Dixmude
Block Island	US Navy	CVE-8	Bogue	Escort carrier		—N/a	Converted freighter. Became HMS Trailer, then HMS Hunter.
Block Island	US Navy	CVE-21	Bogue	Escort carrier		1943–1944	Sunk 29 May 1944 by U-549
Block Island	US Navy	CVE-106	Commencement Bay	Escort carrier		1944–1954	Ex-Sunset Bay (some sources say Sunset).
Bogue	US Navy	CVE-9	Bogue	Escort carrier		1942–1946	
Bois Belleau	French Navy	R97	Independence	Light carrier		1953–1960	Ex-USS Belleau Wood.
Bolinas	US Navy	CVE-36	Bogue	Escort carrier		1943–1943	Ex-Balinas. Became HMS Begum.
Bon Homme Richard	US Navy	CV-10	Essex	Fleet carrier	CATOBAR	—N/a	Renamed Yorktown 1942 before launch.
Bon Homme Richard	US Navy	CV-31	Essex	Fleet carrier	CATOBAR	1944–1971	
Bonaventure	Canadian Navy	CVL-22	Majestic	Light carrier	CATOBAR	1957–1970	Ex-incomplete HMS Powerful.
Bougainville	US Navy	CVE-100	Casablanca	Escort carrier	CATOBAR	1944–1946	Ex-Didrickson Bay.
Boxer	US Navy	CV-21	Essex	Fleet carrier	CATOBAR	1945–1969	
Breton	US Navy	CVE-10	Bogue	Escort carrier		1943–1943	Became HMS Chaser
Breton	US Navy	CVE-23	Bogue	Escort carrier		1943–1946	
Bucareli Bay	US Navy	CVE-61	Casablanca	Escort carrier	CATOBAR	—N/a	Renamed Manila Bay 1943 before launch.
Bucareli Bay	US Navy	CVE-98	Casablanca	Escort carrier	CATOBAR	—N/a	Renamed Kwajalein 1944 before launch.
Bulwark	Royal Navy	R08	Centaur	Fleet carrier	CATOBAR	1954–1981	Converted to commando carrier 1960
Bunker Hill	US Navy	CV-17	Essex	Fleet carrier	CATOBAR	1943–1947	
Cabot	US Navy	CV-16	Essex	Fleet carrier	CATOBAR	—N/a	Renamed Lexington 1942 before launch.
Cabot	US Navy	CVL-28	Independence	Light carrier		1943–1955	To Spain as Dédalo
Campania	Royal Navy	D48	Nairana	Escort carrier		1944–1952	Command ship for first British atomic bomb test
Cape Esperance	US Navy	CVE-88	Casablanca	Escort carrier	CATOBAR	1944–1959	Ex-Tananek Bay.
Cape Gloucester	US Navy	CVE-109	Commencement Bay	Escort carrier		1945–1946	Ex-Willapa Bay.
Card	US Navy	CVE-11	Bogue	Escort carrier		1942–1946	
Carl Vinson	US Navy	CVN-70	Nimitz	Supercarrier	CATOBAR	1982–present	
Carnegie	US Navy	CVE-38	Bogue	Escort carrier		1943–1943	Became HMS Empress.
Casablanca	US Navy	CVE-55	Casablanca	Escort carrier	CATOBAR	1943–1946	Ex-Alazon Bay.
Cavour	Italian Navy	550		Aircraft carrier	V/STOL	2008–present	Ex-Andrea Doria.
Centaur	Royal Navy	R06	Centaur	Fleet carrier	CATOBAR	1953–1965	
Chakri Naruebet	Thai Navy	911	Príncipe de Asturias	Aircraft carrier	STOVL	1997–present	
Chapin Bay	US Navy	CVE-63	Casablanca	Escort carrier	CATOBAR	—N/a	Renamed Midway 1943 after construction began.
Chapin Bay	US Navy	CVE-99	Casablanca	Escort carrier	CATOBAR	—N/a	Renamed Admiralty Islands before construction began.
Charger	US Navy	CVE-30	Charger	Escort carrier		1942–1946	Converted liner. Became HMS Charger 1942, returned to US two days later.
Charger	Royal Navy	D27	Avenger	Escort carrier		1942–1942	Ex-Charger. Returned to US two days later.
Charles de Gaulle	French Navy	R91		Fleet carrier	CATOBAR	2001–present	ex-Richelieu
Chaser	Royal Navy	D32	Attacker	Escort carrier		1943–1946	Ex-USS Breton.
Chatham	US Navy	CVE-32	Bogue	Escort carrier		1943–1943	Became HMS Slinger.
Chenango	US Navy	CVE-28	Sangamon	Escort carrier		1942–1946	Converted oiler.
Chigusa Maru	Japanese Army		Yamashio Maru	Escort carrier	STOBAR	—N/a	1944 tanker conversion, never completed.
Chitose	Japanese Navy		Chitose	Light carrier		1942–1944	Converted seaplane tender. Sunk 25 October 1944 off Leyte Gulf.
Chiyoda	Japanese Navy		Chitose	Light carrier	STOBAR	1943–1944	Converted seaplane tender. Sunk 25 October 1944 off Leyte Gulf.
Chūyō	Japanese Navy		Taiyō	Escort carrier	STOBAR	1942–1943	Converted ocean liner, sunk by USS Sailfish 4 December 1943
Clemenceau	French Navy	R98	Clemenceau	Fleet carrier	CATOBAR	1961–1997	
Colossus	Royal Navy	R15	Colossus	Light fleet carrier	CATOBAR	1944–1946	Loaned (later sold) to France as Arromanches
Commencement Bay	US Navy	CVE-105	Commencement Bay	Escort carrier		1944–1946	Ex-St. Joseph Bay.
Constellation	US Navy	CV-64	Kitty Hawk	Supercarrier	CATOBAR	1961–2003	
Copahee	US Navy	CVE-12	Bogue	Escort carrier		1942–1946	
Coral Sea	US Navy	CVE-57	Casablanca	Escort carrier	CATOBAR	1943–1944	Ex-Alikula Bay. Renamed Anzio to re-use the name for CV-43.
Coral Sea	US Navy	CVB-43	Midway	Fleet carrier		1947–1990	
Cordova	US Navy	CVE-39	Bogue	Escort carrier		1943–1943	Became HMS Khedive.
Core	US Navy	CVE-13	Bogue	Escort carrier		1942–1946	
Corregidor	US Navy	CVE-58	Casablanca	Escort carrier	CATOBAR	1943–1958	Ex-Auguilla Bay.
Courageous	Royal Navy	50	Courageous	Fleet carrier		1928–1939	Converted battlecruiser. Sunk by U-29, 17 September 1939
Cowpens	US Navy	CVL-25	Independence	Light carrier		1943–1947	
Croatan	US Navy	CVE-14	Bogue	Escort carrier		1943–1943	Became HMS Fencer
Croatan	US Navy	CVE-25	Bogue	Escort carrier		1943–1946	
Crown Point	US Navy	CV-32	Essex	Fleet carrier	CATOBAR	—N/a	Renamed Leyte 1945 before launch.
CV-44	US Navy	CV-44	Midway	Fleet carrier		—N/a	Never laid down, cancelled 1943.
CV-50	US Navy	CV-50	Essex	Fleet carrier	CATOBAR	—N/a	Never laid down, cancelled 1945.
CV-51	US Navy	CV-51	Essex	Fleet carrier	CATOBAR	—N/a	Never laid down, cancelled 1945.
CV-52	US Navy	CV-52	Essex	Fleet carrier	CATOBAR	—N/a	Never laid down, cancelled 1945.
CV-53	US Navy	CV-53	Essex	Fleet carrier	CATOBAR	—N/a	Never laid down, cancelled 1945.
CV-54	US Navy	CV-54	Essex	Fleet carrier	CATOBAR	—N/a	Never laid down, cancelled 1945.
CV-55	US Navy	CV-55	Essex	Fleet carrier	CATOBAR	—N/a	Never laid down, cancelled 1945.
CVB-56	US Navy	CVB-56	Midway	Fleet carrier		—N/a	Never laid down, cancelled 1945.
CVB-57	US Navy	CVB-57	Midway	Fleet carrier		—N/a	Never laid down, cancelled 1945.
CVE-128	US Navy	CVE-128	Commencement Bay	Escort carrier		—N/a	Cancelled 1945 after construction began.
CVE-129	US Navy	CVE-129	Commencement Bay	Escort carrier		—N/a	Cancelled 1945 after construction began.
CVE-130	US Navy	CVE-130	Commencement Bay	Escort carrier		—N/a	Cancelled 1945 before construction began.
CVE-131	US Navy	CVE-131	Commencement Bay	Escort carrier		—N/a	Cancelled 1945 before construction began.
CVE-132	US Navy	CVE-132	Commencement Bay	Escort carrier		—N/a	Cancelled 1945 before construction began.
CVE-133	US Navy	CVE-133	Commencement Bay	Escort carrier		—N/a	Cancelled 1945 before construction began.
CVE-134	US Navy	CVE-134	Commencement Bay	Escort carrier		—N/a	Cancelled 1945 before construction began.
CVE-135	US Navy	CVE-135	Commencement Bay	Escort carrier		—N/a	Cancelled 1945 before construction began.
CVE-136	US Navy	CVE-136	Commencement Bay	Escort carrier		—N/a	Cancelled 1945 before construction began.
CVE-137	US Navy	CVE-137	Commencement Bay	Escort carrier		—N/a	Cancelled 1945 before construction began.
CVE-138	US Navy	CVE-138	Commencement Bay	Escort carrier		—N/a	Cancelled 1945 before construction began.
CVE-139	US Navy	CVE-139	Commencement Bay	Escort carrier		—N/a	Cancelled 1945 before construction began.
Daiju Maru	Japanese Navy		Special 1TL Type	Escort carrier	STOBAR	—N/a	Tanker conversion. Cancelled 1945.
Dasher	Royal Navy	D37	Avenger	Escort carrier		1942–1943	Ex-American BAVG-5. Sunk 27 March 1943 following explosion of unknown cause.
Dédalo	Spanish Navy		Independence	Light carrier		1967–1989	Ex-USS Cabot.
Delgada	US Navy	CVE-40	Bogue	Escort carrier		1943–1943	Became HMS Speaker.
Didrickson Bay	US Navy	CVE-64	Casablanca	Escort carrier	CATOBAR	—N/a	Renamed Tripoli 1943 before launch.
Didrickson Bay	US Navy	CVE-100	Casablanca	Escort carrier	CATOBAR	—N/a	Renamed Bougainville before construction began.
Dixmude	French Navy		Charger	Escort carrier		1945–1966	Ex-HMS Biter.
Dolomi Bay	US Navy	CVE-65	Casablanca	Escort carrier	CATOBAR	—N/a	Renamed Wake Island 1943 before launch.
Dolomi Bay	US Navy	CVE-101	Casablanca	Escort carrier	CATOBAR	—N/a	Renamed Matanikau 1944 before launch.
Duke of Edinburgh	Royal Navy		CVA-01	Fleet carrier	CATOBAR	—N/a	Planned 1960s fleet carrier, but never ordered.
Dwight D. Eisenhower	US Navy	CVN-69	Nimitz	Supercarrier	CATOBAR	1977–present	
Eagle	Royal Navy	94		Fleet carrier		1924–1942	Converted battleship. Sunk by U-73, 11 August 1942
Eagle	Royal Navy		Audacious	Fleet carrier	CATOBAR	—N/a	Laid down 1944, cancelled 1946.
Eagle	Royal Navy	R05	Audacious	Fleet carrier	CATOBAR	1951–1972	Ex-Audacious.
Edisto	US Navy	CVE-41	Bogue	Escort carrier		1943–1943	Became HMS Nabob.
Elbe	German Navy		Jade	Auxiliary aircraft carrier		—N/a	Liner conversion, cancelled 1943.
Elbour Bay	US Navy	CVE-66	Casablanca	Escort carrier	CATOBAR	—N/a	Renamed White Plains 1943 before launch.
Elbour Bay	US Navy	CVE-102	Casablanca	Escort carrier	CATOBAR	—N/a	Renamed Attu before construction began.
Elephant	Royal Navy		Centaur	Light carrier	CATOBAR	—N/a	Laid down 1944, not completed until 1959 as HMS Hermes.
Emperor	Royal Navy	D98	Ruler	Escort carrier		1943–1946	Ex-USS Pybus.
Emperor	US Navy	CVE-67	Casablanca	Escort carrier	CATOBAR	—N/a	Renamed Nassuk Bay 1943 after construction began.
Empire MacAlpine	British Merchant Navy	MH	Empire	Merchant aircraft carrier		1943–1945	(Note: Converted grain carrier with added deck and hangar, still carried cargo but reduced capacity.) Returned to commercial service
Empire MacAndrew	British Merchant Navy	MK	Empire	Merchant aircraft carrier		1943–1945	Returned to commercial service
Empire MacCabe	British Merchant Navy	ML	Empire	Merchant aircraft carrier		1943–1945	Returned to commercial service
Empire MacCallum	British Merchant Navy	MN	Empire	Merchant aircraft carrier		1943–1945	Returned to commercial service
Empire MacColl	British Merchant Navy	MB	Empire	Merchant aircraft carrier		1943–1945	Returned to commercial service
Empire MacDermott	British Merchant Navy	MS	Empire	Merchant aircraft carrier		1944–1945	Returned to commercial service
Empire MacKay	British Merchant Navy	MH	Empire	Merchant aircraft carrier		1943–1945	Returned to commercial service
Empire MacKendrick	British Merchant Navy	MO	Empire	Merchant aircraft carrier		1943–1945	Returned to commercial service
Empire MacMahon	British Merchant Navy	MJ	Empire	Merchant aircraft carrier		1943–1945	Returned to commercial service
Empire MacRae	British Merchant Navy	MU	Empire	Merchant aircraft carrier		1943–1945	Returned to commercial service
Empress	Royal Navy	D42	Ruler	Escort carrier		1943–1946	Ex-USS Carnegie.
Eniwetok	US Navy	CVE-125	Commencement Bay	Escort carrier		—N/a	Keel laid April 1945, cancelled before launch
Enterprise	US Navy	CV-6	Yorktown	Fleet carrier		1938–1947	
Enterprise	US Navy	CVN-65	Enterprise	Supercarrier		1961–2012	First nuclear-powered carrier
Enterprise	US Navy	CVN-80	Gerald R. Ford	Supercarrier	CATOBAR	—N/a	Commissioning 2025.
Essex	US Navy	CV-9	Essex	Fleet carrier	CATOBAR	1942–1969	
Estero	US Navy	CVE-42	Bogue	Escort carrier		1943–1943	Became HMS Premier.
Falco	Italian Navy			Aircraft carrier		—N/a	Liner conversion began 1942. Renamed Sparviero but never completed.
Fanshaw Bay	US Navy	CVE-70	Casablanca	Escort carrier	CATOBAR	1943–1946	
Fencer	Royal Navy	D64	Attacker	Escort carrier		1943–1946	Ex-USS Croatan.
Flugzeugträger B	German Navy		Graf Zeppelin	Fleet carrier		—N/a	Started 1938, cancelled 1939. Proposed name was Peter Strasser.
Flugzeugträger C	German Navy		Graf Zeppelin	Fleet carrier		—N/a	Cancelled 1938 before construction began.
Flugzeugträger D	German Navy		Graf Zeppelin	Fleet carrier		—N/a	Cancelled 1938 before construction began.
Foch	French Navy	R99	Clemenceau	Fleet carrier	CATOBAR	1963–2000	sold to Brazil as São Paulo
Formidable	Royal Navy	67	Illustrious	Fleet carrier	CATOBAR	1940–1947	
Forrestal	US Navy	CV-59	Forrestal	Supercarrier	CATOBAR	1955–1993	First supercarrier
Fortaleza Bay	US Navy	CVE-72	Casablanca	Escort carrier	CATOBAR	—N/a	Ex-Fortazela Bay. Renamed Tulagi 1943 before launch.
Fortazela Bay	US Navy	CVE-72	Casablanca	Escort carrier	CATOBAR	—N/a	Renamed Fortaleza Bay 1943 before launch due to spelling error.
Franklin	US Navy	CV-13	Essex	Fleet carrier	CATOBAR	1944–1947	Badly damaged March 1945
Franklin D. Roosevelt	US Navy	CVB-42	Midway	Fleet carrier		1945–1977	
Frosty Bay	US Navy	CVE-112	Commencement Bay	Escort carrier		—N/a	Renamed Siboney 1944 before launch.
Furious	Royal Navy	47	Courageous	Fleet carrier		1925–1945	Converted battlecruiser.
Gadila	Dutch Merchant Navy	MAC 6	Rapana	Merchant aircraft carrier		1944–1946	Returned to commercial service
Gambier Bay	US Navy	CVE-73	Casablanca	Escort carrier	CATOBAR	1943–1944	Sunk by Japanese gunfire at Battle of Leyte Gulf 25 October 1944
George H.W. Bush	US Navy	CVN-77	Nimitz	Supercarrier	CATOBAR	2009–present	
George Washington	US Navy	CVN-73	Nimitz	Supercarrier	CATOBAR	1992–present	
Gerald R. Ford	US Navy	CVN-78	Gerald R. Ford	Supercarrier	CATOBAR	2017–present	In-service
Gibraltar	Royal Navy	D68	Malta	Fleet carrier	CATOBAR	—N/a	Ordered 1943 but never laid down.
Gilbert Islands	US Navy	CVE-107	Commencement Bay	Escort carrier		1945–1955	Ex-St. Andrews Bay. Converted to communication relay ship USS Annapolis
Giuseppe Garibaldi	Italian Navy	551		Aircraft carrier	STOVL	1983–2024	To Indonesia as KRI Sriwijaya
Glacier	US Navy	CVE-33	Bogue	Escort carrier		1943–1943	Became HMS Atheling.
Glorious	Royal Navy	77	Courageous	Fleet carrier		1930–1940	Converted battlecruiser. Sunk by Scharnhorst and Gneisenau 8 June 1940
Glory	Royal Navy	R62	Colossus	Light fleet carrier	CATOBAR	1943–1956	
Graf Zeppelin	German Navy		Graf Zeppelin	Fleet carrier		—N/a	Launched 1938, never completed.
Guadalcanal	US Navy	CVE-60	Casablanca	Escort carrier	CATOBAR	1943–1946	Ex-Astrolabe Bay. Captured U-505
Hamlin	US Navy	CVE-15	Bogue	Escort carrier		1942–1942	Became HMS Stalker
Hancock	US Navy	CV-14	Essex	Fleet carrier	CATOBAR	—N/a	Renamed Ticonderoga 1943 before launch.
Hancock	US Navy	CV-19	Essex	Fleet carrier	CATOBAR	1944–1976	Ex-Ticonderoga (CV-19).
Harry S. Truman	US Navy	CVN-75	Nimitz	Supercarrier	CATOBAR	1998–present	Ex-United States
Hercules	Royal Navy	R49	Majestic	Light fleet carrier	CATOBAR / STOVL	—N/a	Launched 1945. To India 1957 and completed as INS Vikrant.
Hermes	Royal Navy	95		Fleet carrier	CATOBAR / STOBAR	1924–1942	First purpose built carrier launched. Sunk 9 April 1942 by Japanese aircraft.
Hermes	Royal Navy		Centaur	Light carrier	CATOBAR	—N/a	Laid down 1944, cancelled 1945.
Hermes	Royal Navy	R12	Centaur	Fleet carrier	CATOBAR / STOVL	1959–1984	Ex-Elephant. To India as INS Viraat
Hiryū	Japanese Navy			Fleet carrier	STOBAR	1939–1942	Sunk at Midway
Hiyō	Japanese Navy		Hiyō	Fleet carrier	STOBAR	1942–1944	Converted ocean liner, sunk at Battle of the Philippine Sea
Hobart Bay	US Navy	CVE-113	Commencement Bay	Escort carrier		—N/a	Renamed Puget Sound 1944 before launch.
Hoggatt Bay	US Navy	CVE-75	Casablanca	Escort carrier	CATOBAR	1944–1946	
Hollandia	US Navy	CVE-97	Casablanca	Escort carrier	CATOBAR	1944–1947	Ex-Astrolabe Bay.
Hornet	US Navy	CV-8	Yorktown	Fleet carrier		1941–1942	Sunk in Battle of the Santa Cruz Islands.
Hornet	US Navy	CV-12	Essex	Fleet carrier	CATOBAR	1943–1970	Ex-Kearsarge (CV-12). Museum at Alameda, CA.
Hōshō	Japanese Navy			Fleet carrier	STOBAR	1922–1946	
Hunter	Royal Navy	D80	Attacker	Escort carrier		1943–1945	Ex-USS Block Island. Renamed from HMS Trailer.
Ibuki	Japanese Navy			Light carrier	STOBAR	—N/a	Launched 1943, never completed.
I	German Navy			Auxiliary aircraft carrier		—N/a	Transport conversion, cancelled 1942.
II	German Navy			Auxiliary aircraft carrier		—N/a	Cruiser conversion, cancelled 1943.
Ikoma	Japanese Navy		Unryū	Light carrier	STOBAR	1944–1945	Sunk in Kure dockyard 24 July 1945
Illustrious	Royal Navy	87	Illustrious	Fleet carrier	CATOBAR	1940–1954	
Illustrious	Royal Navy	R06	Invincible	Aircraft carrier	STOVL	1982–2014	
Implacable	Royal Navy	R86	Implacable	Fleet carrier	CATOBAR	1944–1954	
Indefatigable	Royal Navy	R10	Implacable	Fleet carrier	CATOBAR	1944–1946	
Independence	US Navy	CVL-22	Independence	Light carrier		1943–1946	
Independence	US Navy	CV-62	Forrestal	Supercarrier	CATOBAR	1959–1998	
Independencia	Argentine Navy	V-1	Colossus	Light fleet carrier	CATOBAR	1958–1970	Ex-HMS Warrior
Indomitable	Royal Navy	92	Illustrious	Fleet carrier	CATOBAR	1941–1953	
Indomitable	Royal Navy	R07	Invincible	Aircraft carrier	STOVL	—N/a	Renamed Ark Royal before construction began.
Intrepid	US Navy	CV-11	Essex	Fleet carrier	CATOBAR	1943–1974	Museum in New York City.
Invincible	Royal Navy	R05	Invincible	Aircraft carrier	STOVL	1980–2005	
Irresistible	Royal Navy	R09	Audacious	Fleet carrier	CATOBAR	—N/a	Renamed Ark Royal before launch.
Iwo Jima	US Navy	CV-46	Essex	Fleet carrier	CATOBAR	—N/a	Laid down 1945, but never completed.
Izumo	Japan Maritime Self-defense Force	DDH-183	Izumo	Aircraft carrier	STOVL	2015–present	Announced conversion from multi-purpose destroyer in 2018
Jade	German Navy		Jade	Auxiliary aircraft carrier		—N/a	Proposed liner conversion, cancelled 1942.
Jamaica	US Navy	CVE-43	Bogue	Escort carrier		1943–1943	Became HMS Shah.
Joffre	French Navy		Joffre	Fleet carrier		—N/a	Under construction 1938–1940, but never completed.
John C. Stennis	US Navy	CVN-74	Nimitz	Supercarrier	CATOBAR	1995–present	
John F. Kennedy	US Navy	CV-67	Modified Kitty Hawk/ John F. Kennedy	Supercarrier	CATOBAR	1968–2007	
John F. Kennedy	US Navy	CVN-79	Gerald R. Ford	Supercarrier	CATOBAR	—N/a	Under construction, planned commissioning 2024
Juan Carlos I	Spanish Navy	L61	Juan Carlos I	STOVL amphibious warfare ship	STOVL	2010–present	
Jun'yō	Japanese Navy		Hiyō	Fleet carrier	STOBAR	1942–1946	Converted ocean liner.
Kadashan Bay	US Navy	CVE-76	Casablanca	Escort carrier	CATOBAR	1944–1946	
Kaga	Japanese Navy			Fleet carrier	STOBAR	1928–1942	Converted battleship. Sunk at Midway
Kaga	Japan Maritime Self-defense Force	DDH–184	Izumo	Aircraft carrier	STOVL	2017–present	Announced conversion from multi-purpose destroyer in 2018
Kaimon	Japanese Navy		Unryū	Light carrier		—N/a	Cancelled 1944 before construction began. Also known as Kurama.
Kaita Bay	US Navy	CVE-78	Casablanca	Escort carrier	CATOBAR	—N/a	Renamed Savo Island 1943 before launch.
Kaiyō	Japanese Navy			Escort carrier	STOBAR	1943–1945	Converted ocean liner. Sunk at Beppu Bay 24 July 1945.
Kalinin Bay	US Navy	CVE-68	Casablanca	Escort carrier	CATOBAR	1943–1946	
Kanalku Bay	US Navy	CVE-77	Casablanca	Escort carrier	CATOBAR	—N/a	Renamed Marcus Island 1943 before launch.
Karel Doorman	Dutch Navy	QH1	Nairana	Escort carrier		1946–1948	Ex-HMS Nairana.
Karel Doorman	Dutch Navy	R81	Colossus	Light fleet carrier	CATOBAR	1948–1968	Ex-HMS Venerable. To Argentina as Veinticinco de Mayo 1969.
Kasaan Bay	US Navy	CVE-69	Casablanca	Escort carrier	CATOBAR	1943–1946	
Kasagi	Japanese Navy		Unryū	Light carrier		—N/a	Launched 1944, but never completed.
Katsuragi	Japanese Navy		Unryū	Fleet carrier		—N/a	Launched 1944, but never completed.
Kearsarge	US Navy	CV-12	Essex	Fleet carrier	CATOBAR	—N/a	Renamed Hornet 1942 before launch.
Kearsarge	US Navy	CV-33	Essex	Fleet carrier	CATOBAR	1946–1970	
Keweenaw	US Navy	CVE-44	Bogue	Escort carrier		1943–1943	Became HMS Patroller.
Khedive	Royal Navy	D62	Ruler	Escort carrier		1943–1946	Ex-USS Cordova.
Kiev	Russian Navy; Soviet Navy	075	Kiev	Aircraft carrier	VTOL	1975–1993	Currently an attraction at Tianjin Binhai theme park in China
Kitkun Bay	US Navy	CVE-71	Casablanca	Escort carrier	CATOBAR	1943–1946	
Kitty Hawk	US Navy	CV-63	Kitty Hawk	Supercarrier	CATOBAR	1961–2009	
Kremlin	Soviet Navy		Ulyanovsk	Supercarrier		—N/a	Renamed Ulyanovsk before construction began, never completed.
Kula Gulf	US Navy	CVE-108	Commencement Bay	Escort carrier		1945–1969	Ex-Vermillion Bay.
Kurama	Japanese Navy		Unryū	Light carrier		—N/a	Cancelled 1944 before construction began. Also known as Kaimon.
Kwajalein	US Navy	CVE-98	Casablanca	Escort carrier	CATOBAR	1944–1946	Ex-Bucareli Bay.
La Fayette	French Navy	R96	Independence	Light carrier		1951–1963	Ex-USS Langley.
Lake Champlain	US Navy	CV-39	Essex	Fleet carrier	CATOBAR	1945–1966	
Langley	US Navy	CV-1		Light carrier		1922–1938	Converted to seaplane tender. Scuttled 27 February 1942 after being damaged by dive bombers.
Langley	US Navy	CVL-27	Independence	Light carrier		1943–1947	To France as La Fayette.
Leonid Brezhnev	Russian Navy		Kuznetsov	Fleet carrier		—N/a	Ex-Riga. Renamed Tbilisi after launch in 1985.
Leviathan	Royal Navy	R97	Majestic	Light carrier	CATOBAR	—N/a	Launched 1945, but never completed.
Lexington	US Navy	CV-2	Lexington	Fleet carrier		1927–1942	Sunk by enemy action on 8 May 1942 during Battle of the Coral Sea.
Lexington	US Navy	CV-16	Essex	Fleet carrier	CATOBAR	1943–1991	Ex-Cabot (CV-16). Museum ship in Corpus Christi, Texas
Leyte	US Navy	CV-32	Essex	Fleet carrier	CATOBAR	1946–1959	Ex-Crown Point (CV-32).
Liaoning	Chinese Navy	16	Type 001	Aircraft carrier	STOBAR	2012–present	Ex-incomplete Varyag from Ukraine 1998.
Lingayen	US Navy	CVE-126	Commencement Bay	Escort carrier		—N/a	Laid down 1945, but never completed.
Liscome Bay	US Navy	CVE-56	Casablanca	Escort carrier	CATOBAR	1943–1943	Sunk by I-175 24 November 1943
Long Island	US Navy	CVE-1	Long Island	Escort carrier		1941–1946	
Luigi Einaudi	Italian Navy	550		Aircraft carrier	STOVL	—N/a	Renamed Andrea Doria before construction began.
Lunga Point	US Navy	CVE-94	Casablanca	Escort carrier	CATOBAR	1944–1946	Ex-Alazon Bay.
Macoma	Dutch Merchant Navy	MAC 7	Rapana	Merchant aircraft carrier		1944–1946	Returned to commercial service
Magnificent	Royal Navy		Majestic	Light carrier	CATOBAR	—N/a	Completed for Canada as HMCS Magnificent. Returned to UK 1956.
Magnificent	Canadian Navy	CVL-21	Majestic	Light carrier	CATOBAR	1948–1956	Ex-HMS Magnificent. Returned to UK 1956.
Majestic	Royal Navy	R77	Majestic	Light carrier	CATOBAR	—N/a	Completed for Australia as HMAS Melbourne.
Makassar Strait	US Navy	CVE-91	Casablanca	Escort carrier	CATOBAR	1944–1946	Ex-Ulitaka Bay.
Makin Island	US Navy	CVE-93	Casablanca	Escort carrier	CATOBAR	1944–1946	Ex-Woodcliff Bay.
Malta	Royal Navy	D93	Malta	Fleet carrier	CATOBAR	—N/a	Ordered 1943 but never laid down.
Manila Bay	US Navy	CVE-61	Casablanca	Escort carrier	CATOBAR	1943–1946	Ex-Bucareli Bay.
Marcus Island	US Navy	CVE-77	Casablanca	Escort carrier	CATOBAR	1944–1946	Ex-Kanalku Bay.
Matanikau	US Navy	CVE-101	Casablanca	Escort carrier	CATOBAR	1944–1946	Ex-Dolomi Bay.
McClure	US Navy	CVE-45	Bogue	Escort carrier		—N/a	Renamed Prince 1942 before construction began.
Melbourne	Royal Australian Navy	R21	Majestic	Light carrier	CATOBAR	1955–1982	ex-HMS Majestic completed for Royal Australian Navy.
Midway	US Navy	CVE-63	Casablanca	Escort carrier	CATOBAR	—N/a	Ex-Chapin Bay. Renamed USS St. Lo to free name for CV-41
Midway	US Navy	CVB-41	Midway	Fleet carrier		1945–1992	Museum in San Diego, CA
Minas Gerais	Brazilian Navy	A11	Colossus	Light fleet carrier	CATOBAR	1960–2001	(Note: HMS Vengeance loaned to Australia from 1952 to 1956 as HMAS Vengeance, sold to Brazil 1956 as Minas Gerais.)
Mindoro	US Navy	CVE-120	Commencement Bay	Escort carrier		1945–1955	
Minsk	Russian Navy; Soviet Navy	025/011	Kiev	Aircraft carrier	VTOL	1978–1993	Currently a tourist attraction in Shenzhen, China.
Miralda	British Merchant Navy	MAC 8	Rapana	Merchant aircraft carrier		1944–1946	Returned to commercial service
Mission Bay	US Navy	CVE-59	Casablanca	Escort carrier	CATOBAR	1943–1958	
Monmouth	Royal Navy	96	Centaur	Light carrier	CATOBAR	—N/a	Never laid down, cancelled 1945.
Monterey	US Navy	CVL-26	Independence	Light carrier		1943–1956	
Mosser Bay	US Navy	CVE-114	Commencement Bay	Escort carrier		—N/a	Renamed Willamette after launch.
Munda	US Navy	CVE-104	Casablanca	Escort carrier	CATOBAR	1944–1946	Ex-Tonowek Bay.
Nabob	Royal Navy	D77	Bogue	Escort carrier		1943–1944	Ex-USS Edisto. Canadian crew.
Nairana	Royal Navy	D05	Nairana	Escort carrier		1943–1946	To Netherlands as HNLMS Karel Doorman
Nassau	US Navy	CVE-16	Bogue	Escort carrier		1942–1946	
Nassuk Bay	US Navy	CVE-67	Casablanca	Escort carrier	CATOBAR	—N/a	Ex-Emperor. Renamed Solomons 1943 after launch.
Natoma Bay	US Navy	CVE-62	Casablanca	Escort carrier	CATOBAR	1943–1946	
Nehenta Bay	US Navy	CVE-74	Casablanca	Escort carrier	CATOBAR	1944–1946	
New Zealand	Royal Navy	D43	Malta	Fleet carrier	CATOBAR	—N/a	Ordered 1943 but never laid down.
Niantic	US Navy	CVE-46	Bogue	Escort carrier		1943–1943	Became HMS Ranee.
Nimitz	US Navy	CVN-68	Nimitz	Supercarrier	CATOBAR	1975–present	
Novorossiysk	Russian Navy; Soviet Navy	137	Kiev	Aircraft carrier	VTOL	1982–1993	
Ocean	Royal Navy	R68	Colossus	Light fleet carrier	CATOBAR	1945–1960	
Okinawa	US Navy	CVE-127	Commencement Bay	Escort carrier		—N/a	Laid down 1945, cancelled before launch
Ommaney Bay	US Navy	CVE-79	Casablanca	Escort carrier	CATOBAR	1944–1945	Sunk by kamikaze aircraft 4 January 1945.
Oriskany	US Navy	CV-18	Essex	Fleet carrier	CATOBAR	—N/a	Renamed Wasp 1943 before launch.
Oriskany	US Navy	CV-34	Essex	Fleet carrier	CATOBAR	1950–1975	Florida artificial reef in 2006.
Otakisan Maru	Japanese Navy		Special 1TL Type	Escort carrier		—N/a	Tanker conversion. Launched 1945 but never completed.
Painlevé	French Navy		Joffre	Fleet carrier		—N/a	Planned for 1938, never laid down
Palau	US Navy	CVE-122	Commencement Bay	Escort carrier		1946–1954	
Patroller	Royal Navy	D07	Bogue	Escort carrier		1943–1947	Ex-USS Keweenaw.
Perdido	US Navy	CVE-47	Bogue	Escort carrier		1943–1944	Became HMS Trouncer.
Peter Strasser	German Navy		Graf Zeppelin	Fleet carrier		—N/a	See Flugzeugträger B.
Petrof Bay	US Navy	CVE-80	Casablanca	Escort carrier	CATOBAR	1944–1946	
Philippine Sea	US Navy	CV-47	Essex	Fleet carrier	CATOBAR	1946–1958	
Point Cruz	US Navy	CVE-119	Commencement Bay	Escort carrier		1945–1956	Ex-Trocadero Bay.
Polyphemus	Royal Navy	57	Centaur	Light carrier	CATOBAR	—N/a	Never laid down, cancelled 1945.
Portage Bay	US Navy	CVE-115	Commencement Bay	Escort carrier		—N/a	Renamed Bairoko before construction began.
Powerful	Royal Navy	R95	Majestic	Light carrier	CATOBAR	—N/a	Completed for Canada as HMCS Bonaventure
Premier	Royal Navy	D23	Bogue	Escort carrier		1943–1946	Ex-USS Estero.
Pretoria Castle	Royal Navy	F61		Escort carrier		1943–1946	Converted armed merchant cruiser.
Prince	US Navy	CVE-45	Bogue	Escort carrier		—N/a	Ex-McClure. Became HMS Rajah.
Prince of Wales	Royal Navy	R09	Queen Elizabeth	Supercarrier	STOVL	2019–present	Commissioned 10 December 2019
Prince William	US Navy	CVE-19	Bogue	Escort carrier		1943–1943	Became HMS Striker
Prince William	US Navy	CVE-31	Bogue	Escort carrier		1943–1946	
Princeton	US Navy	CVL-23	Independence	Light carrier		1943–1944	Sunk 24 October 1944 at Leyte Gulf
Princeton	US Navy	CV-37	Essex	Fleet carrier	CATOBAR	1945–1970	
Principe de Asturias	Spanish Navy	R-11	Príncipe de Asturias	Aircraft carrier	STOVL	1988–2013	
Puget Sound	US Navy	CVE-113	Commencement Bay	Escort carrier		1945–1946	Ex-Hobart Bay.
Puncher	Royal Navy	D79	Bogue	Escort carrier		1944–1946	Ex-USS Willapa. Canadian crew.
Pursuer	Royal Navy	D73	Bogue	Escort carrier		1942–1946	Ex-USS St. George.
Pybus	US Navy	CVE-34	Bogue	Escort carrier		1943–1943	Became HMS Emperor.
Queen	Royal Navy	D19	Bogue	Escort carrier		1943–1947	Ex-USS St. Andrews.
Queen Elizabeth	Royal Navy		CVA-01	Fleet carrier	CATOBAR	—N/a	Announced 1963, cancelled 1966 before work started.
Queen Elizabeth	Royal Navy	R08	Queen Elizabeth	Supercarrier	STOVL	2017–present	Commissioned 7 December 2017
Rabaul	US Navy	CVE-121	Commencement Bay	Escort carrier		—N/a	Completed but never commissioned.
Rajah	Royal Navy	D10	Bogue	Escort carrier		1943–1947	Ex-USS Prince.
Randolph	US Navy	CV-15	Essex	Fleet carrier	CATOBAR	1944–1969	
Ranee	Royal Navy	D03	Bogue	Escort carrier		1943–1947	Ex-USS Niantic.
Ranger	US Navy	CV-4		Fleet carrier		1934–1946	
Ranger	US Navy	CV-61	Forrestal	Supercarrier	CATOBAR	1957–1993	
Rapana	Royal Navy	MAC 9	Rapana	Merchant aircraft carrier		1942–1946	Returned to commercial service
Ravager	Royal Navy	D70	Bogue	Escort carrier		1943–1946	
Reaper	Royal Navy	D82	Bogue	Escort carrier		1944–1946	Ex-USS Winjah.
Rendova	US Navy	CVE-114	Commencement Bay	Escort carrier		1945–1955	Ex-Willamette.
Reprisal	US Navy	CVL-30	Independence	Light carrier		—N/a	Renamed San Jacinto 1942 before launch.
Reprisal	US Navy	CV-35	Essex	Fleet carrier	CATOBAR	—N/a	Started 1944, cancelled 1945.
Richelieu	French Navy			Fleet carrier		—N/a	Renamed Charles de Gaulle before construction began.
Richelieu (PA2)	French Navy		Modified Queen Elizabeth	Supercarrier	CATOBAR	—N/a	Cancelled 2013 before construction began.
Riga	Russian Navy		Kuznetsov	Fleet carrier		—N/a	Renamed Leonid Brezhnev after construction began in 1982.
Riga	Soviet Navy		Kuznetsov	Aircraft carrier		—N/a	Renamed to Varyag in 1990 after construction began.
Roi	US Navy	CVE-103	Casablanca	Escort carrier	CATOBAR	1944–1946	Ex-Alava Bay.
Ronald Reagan	US Navy	CVN-76	Nimitz	Supercarrier	CATOBAR	2003–present	
Rudyerd Bay	US Navy	CVE-81	Casablanca	Escort carrier	CATOBAR	1944–1946	
Ruler	Royal Navy	D72	Bogue	Escort carrier		1943–1946	Ex-USS St. Joseph.
Ryūhō	Japanese Navy			Light carrier		1942–1945	Converted submarine tender. Severely damage by aircraft March 1945 not repaired
Ryūjō	Japanese Navy			Light carrier		1933–1942	Sunk by aircraft during Battle of the Eastern Solomons
Sable	US Navy	IX-81		Training carrier		1943–1945	Converted paddle-wheel steamer.
Saginaw Bay	US Navy	CVE-82	Casablanca	Escort carrier	CATOBAR	1944–1946	
Saidor	US Navy	CVE-117	Commencement Bay	Escort carrier		1945–1947	Ex-Saltery Bay.
Saipan	US Navy	CVL-48	Saipan	Light carrier		1946–1965	
Salamaua	US Navy	CVE-96	Casablanca	Escort carrier	CATOBAR	1944–1946	Ex-Anguilla Bay.
Salerno Bay	US Navy	CVE-110	Commencement Bay	Escort carrier		1945–1954	Ex-Winjah Bay.
Saltery Bay	US Navy	CVE-117	Commencement Bay	Escort carrier		—N/a	Renamed Saidor 1944 before construction began.
San Alberto Bay	US Navy	CVE-116	Commencement Bay	Escort carrier		—N/a	Renamed Badoeng Strait before construction began.
San Jacinto	US Navy	CVL-30	Independence	Light carrier		1943–1947	Ex-Reprisal (CVL-30).
Sandy Bay	US Navy	CVE-118	Commencement Bay	Escort carrier		—N/a	Renamed Sicily 1944 before construction began.
Sangamon	US Navy	CVE-26	Sangamon	Escort carrier		1942–1945	Converted oiler.
Santee	US Navy	CVE-29	Sangamon	Escort carrier		1942–1946	Converted oiler.
São Paulo	Brazilian Navy	A12	Clemenceau	Fleet carrier	CATOBAR	2000–2017	Ex-Foch.
Saratoga	US Navy	CV-3	Lexington	Fleet carrier		1927–1946	Expended as a target ship in the 1946 Bikini atomic bomb tests.
Saratoga	US Navy	CV-60	Forrestal	Supercarrier	CATOBAR	1956–1994	
Sargent Bay	US Navy	CVE-83	Casablanca	Escort carrier	CATOBAR	1944–1946	
Savo Island	US Navy	CVE-78	Casablanca	Escort carrier	CATOBAR	1944–1946	Ex-Kaita Bay.
Searcher	Royal Navy	D40	Bogue	Escort carrier		1943–1945	
Shah	Royal Navy	D21	Bogue	Escort carrier		1943–1946	Ex-USS Jamaica.
Shamrock Bay	US Navy	CVE-84	Casablanca	Escort carrier	CATOBAR	1944–1946	
Shandong	Chinese Navy	17	Type 002	Aircraft carrier	STOBAR	2019–present	First domestically built Chinese aircraft carrier.
Shangri-La	US Navy	CV-38	Essex	Fleet carrier	CATOBAR	1944–1971	
Shimane Maru	Japanese Navy		Special 1TL Type	Escort carrier		1945–1945	Tanker conversion. Sunk by British aircraft.
Shinano	Japanese Navy			Fleet carrier		1944–1944	Converted Yamato-class battleship. Sunk by USS Archerfish 29 November 1944.
Shin'yō	Japanese Navy			Escort carrier		1943–1944	Converted ocean liner, sunk by USS Spadefish on 17 November 1944.
Shipley Bay	US Navy	CVE-85	Casablanca	Escort carrier	CATOBAR	1944–1946	
Shōhō	Japanese Navy		Zuihō	Light carrier		1941–1942	Sunk by aircraft at Coral Sea
Shōkaku	Japanese Navy		Shōkaku	Fleet carrier		1941–1944	Sunk by USS Cavalla 19 June 1944
Siboney	US Navy	CVE-112	Commencement Bay	Escort carrier		1945–1956	Ex-Frosty Bay.
Sicily	US Navy	CVE-118	Commencement Bay	Escort carrier		1945–1954	Ex-Sandy Bay.
Sitkoh Bay	US Navy	CVE-86	Casablanca	Escort carrier	CATOBAR	1944–1946; 1950–1954	
Slinger	Royal Navy	D26	Bogue	Escort carrier		1943–1946	Ex-USS Chatham.
Smiter	Royal Navy	D55	Bogue	Escort carrier		1944–1946	Ex-USS Vermillion.
Solomons	US Navy	CVE-67	Casablanca	Escort carrier	CATOBAR	1943–1946	Ex-Nassuk Bay.
Sōryū	Japanese Navy			Fleet carrier		1937–1942	Sunk at Midway 4 June 1942
Sparviero	Italian Navy			Aircraft carrier		—N/a	Ex-Falco, never completed.
Speaker	Royal Navy	D90	Bogue	Escort carrier		1943–1946	Ex-USS Delgada.
Sriwijaya	Indonesian Navy	100		Aircraft carrier	STOVL	2026–present	Ex-Giuseppe Garibaldi
St. Andrews	US Navy	CVE-49	Bogue	Escort carrier		—N/a	Became HMS Queen.
St. Andrews Bay	US Navy	CVE-107	Commencement Bay	Escort carrier		—N/a	Renamed Gilbert Islands 1944 before launch.
St. George	US Navy	CVE-17	Bogue	Escort carrier		—N/a	Became HMS Pursuer
St. Joseph	US Navy	CVE-50	Bogue	Escort carrier		—N/a	Became HMS Ruler.
St. Joseph Bay	US Navy	CVE-105	Commencement Bay	Escort carrier		—N/a	Renamed Commencement Bay 1944 after launch.
St. Lo	US Navy	CVE-63	Casablanca	Escort carrier	CATOBAR	1944–1944	Ex-USS Midway, renamed to use name for CV-41. Sunk by kamikaze aircraft 25 October 1944.
St. Simon	US Navy	CVE-51	Bogue	Escort carrier		—N/a	Became HMS Arbiter.
Stalker	Royal Navy	D91	Bogue	Escort carrier		1942–1945	Ex-USS Hamlin.
Steamer Bay	US Navy	CVE-87	Casablanca	Escort carrier	CATOBAR	1944–1947	
Striker	Royal Navy	D12	Bogue	Escort carrier		1943–1946	ex-USS Prince William.
Sunset	US Navy	CVE-48	Bogue	Escort carrier		—N/a	Became HMS Thane.
Sunset Bay	US Navy	CVE-106	Commencement Bay	Escort carrier		—N/a	Some sources say the name was Sunset. Renamed Block Island 1944 before launch.
Suwannee	US Navy	CVE-27	Sangamon	Escort carrier		1942–1946	Converted oiler.
Sydney	Royal Australian Navy	R17	Majestic	Light carrier	CATOBAR	1948–1958	ex-HMS Terrible completed for Royal Australian Navy.
Taihō	Japanese Navy		Taihō	Fleet carrier		1944–1944	Sunk in the Battle of the Philippine Sea, 19 June 1944
Taisha Maru	Japanese Navy		Special 1TL Type	Escort carrier		—N/a	Proposed tanker conversion. Cancelled 1944.
Taiyō	Japanese Navy		Taiyō	Escort carrier		1941–1944	Converted ocean liner. Sunk by USS Rasher 18 August 1944
Takanis Bay	US Navy	CVE-89	Casablanca	Escort carrier	CATOBAR	1944–1946	
Tananek Bay	US Navy	CVE-88	Casablanca	Escort carrier	CATOBAR	—N/a	Renamed Cape Esperance 1943 before construction began.
Tarawa	US Navy	CV-40	Essex	Fleet carrier	CATOBAR	1945–1960	
Tbilisi	Soviet Navy	113	Kuznetsov	Aircraft cruiser		—N/a	ex-Leonid Brezhnev. Renamed Admiral Flota Sovetskogo Sozuya Kuznetzov 1990.
Terrible	Royal Navy	R93	Majestic	Light carrier	CATOBAR	—N/a	Completed for Australia as HMAS Sydney.
Thane	Royal Navy	D48	Bogue	Escort carrier		1943–1945	Ex-USS Sunset.
Theodore Roosevelt	US Navy	CVN-71	Nimitz	Supercarrier	CATOBAR	1986–present	
Theseus	Royal Navy	R64	Colossus	Light fleet carrier	CATOBAR	1946–1956	
Thetis Bay	US Navy	CVE-90	Casablanca	Escort carrier	CATOBAR	1944–1964	
Ticonderoga	US Navy	CV-19	Essex	Fleet carrier	CATOBAR	—N/a	Renamed Hancock 1943 before launch.
Ticonderoga	US Navy	CV-14	Essex	Fleet carrier	CATOBAR	1944–1973	Ex-Hancock (CV-14).
Tinian	US Navy	CVE-123	Commencement Bay	Escort carrier		—N/a	Completed 1946, but never commissioned
Tonowek Bay	US Navy	CVE-104	Casablanca	Escort carrier	CATOBAR	—N/a	Renamed Munda 1943 before construction began.
Totem Bay	US Navy	CVE-111	Commencement Bay	Escort carrier		—N/a	Renamed Vella Gulf 1944 before launch.
Tracker	Royal Navy	D24	Bogue	Escort carrier		1943–1946	
Trailer	Royal Navy	D80	Attacker	Escort carrier		1943–1943	Ex-USS Block Island. Renamed to HMS Hunter 1943.
Tripoli	US Navy	CVE-64	Casablanca	Escort carrier	CATOBAR	1943–1958	Ex-Didrickson Bay.
Triumph	Royal Navy	R16	Colossus	Light fleet carrier	CATOBAR	1946–1975	
Trocadero Bay	US Navy	CVE-119	Commencement Bay	Escort carrier		—N/a	Renamed Point Cruz 1944 before construction began.
Trouncer	Royal Navy	D85	Bogue	Escort carrier		1944–1946	Ex-USS Perdido.
Trumpeter	Royal Navy	D09	Bogue	Escort carrier		1943–1946	Ex-USS Bastian.
Tulagi	US Navy	CVE-72	Casablanca	Escort carrier	CATOBAR	1943–1946	Ex-Fortaleza Bay.
Fujian	Chinese Navy	18	Type 003	Supercarrier	CATOBAR	2025–present	
Type 004	Chinese Navy		Type 004	Supercarrier	CATOBAR	—N/a	Under preliminary stages of construction. Planned for commission by late 2020s.
Ulitaka Bay	US Navy	CVE-91	Casablanca	Escort carrier	CATOBAR	—N/a	Renamed Makassar Strait 1943 before construction began.
Ulyanovsk	Soviet Navy		Ulyanovsk	Supercarrier	CATOBAR	—N/a	Ex-Kremlin. Under construction 1988–1991, never completed.
Unicorn	Royal Navy	I72		Light aircraft carrier, Aircraft repair ship		1943–1946, 1949–1953	
United States	US Navy	CVA-58	United States	Supercarrier	CATOBAR	—N/a	Laid down 18 April 1949, cancelled five days later.
United States	US Navy	CVN-75	Nimitz	Supercarrier	CATOBAR	—N/a	Renamed Harry S. Truman 1992 after launch.
Unryū	Japanese Navy		Unryū	Fleet carrier		1944–1944	Sunk by USS Redfish on 19 December 1944
Un'yō	Japanese Navy		Taiyō	Escort carrier		1942–1944	Sunk by USS Barb 17 September 1944
Valley Forge	US Navy	CV-45	Essex	Fleet carrier	CATOBAR	1946–1970	
Varyag	Soviet Navy		Kuznetsov	Aircraft carrier		—N/a	Ex-Riga. To Ukraine 1992 while still under construction. Construction cancelled 1995. To China as Liaoning 1998.
Veinticinco de Mayo	Argentine Navy	V-2	Colossus	Light fleet carrier	CATOBAR	1968–1997	Ex-Dutch Karel Doorman (R81) 1969.
Vella Gulf	US Navy	CVE-111	Commencement Bay	Escort carrier		1945–1946	Ex-Totem Bay.
Venerable	Royal Navy	R63	Colossus	Light fleet carrier	CATOBAR	1945–1947	To Netherlands as Karel Doorman 1948.
Vengeance	Royal Navy	R71	Colossus	Light fleet carrier	CATOBAR	1945–1952	
Vengeance	Royal Australian Navy	R71	Colossus	Light fleet carrier	CATOBAR	1952–1955	On loan from the Royal Navy
Verdun	French Navy			Attack carrier		—N/a	Never laid down, cancelled 1961
Vermillion	US Navy	CVE-52	Bogue	Escort carrier		—N/a	Became HMS Smiter.
Vermillion Bay	US Navy	CVE-108	Commencement Bay	Escort carrier		—N/a	Renamed Kula Gulf 1943 before construction began.
Victorious	Royal Navy	R38	Illustrious	Fleet carrier	CATOBAR	1941–1968	
Vikramaditya	Indian Navy	R33	Kiev	Aircraft carrier	STOBAR	2013–present	ex-Russian Admiral Gorshkov.
Vikrant	Indian Navy	R11	Majestic	Light fleet carrier	CATOBAR / STOVL	1961–1997	Ex-HMS Hercules completed for India.
Vikrant	Indian Navy	IAC-I		Aircraft carrier	STOBAR	2022–present	Commissioned in 2022
Vindex	Royal Navy	D15	Nairana	Escort carrier		1943–1947	
Viraat	Indian Navy	R22	Centaur	Fleet carrier	STOVL	1987–2017	ex-HMS Hermes.
Vishal	Indian Navy	IAC-II		Supercarrier		—N/a	Planned. Scheduled to commission in 2025.
Wake Island	US Navy	CVE-65	Casablanca	Escort carrier	CATOBAR	1943–1946	Ex-Dolomi Bay.
Warrior	Canadian Navy	R31	Colossus	Light fleet carrier	CATOBAR	1946–1948	Ex-HMS Warrior. Returned to UK.
Warrior	Royal Navy	R31	Colossus	Light fleet carrier	CATOBAR	1945–1946, 1948–1958	To Canada as HMCS Warrior. Returned to UK and thence to Argentina as Independencia.
Wasp	US Navy	CV-7	Wasp	Light carrier		1940–1942	Sunk 15 September 1942.
Wasp	US Navy	CV-18	Essex	Fleet carrier	CATOBAR	1943–1972	Ex-Oriskany.
Weser	German Navy			Aircraft carrier		—N/a	1942–1943 cruiser conversion, never completed.
White Plains	US Navy	CVE-66	Casablanca	Escort carrier	CATOBAR	1943–1946	Ex-Elbour Bay.
Willamette	US Navy	CVE-114	Commencement Bay	Escort carrier		—N/a	Ex-Mosser Bay. Renamed Rendova at commissioning.
Willapa	US Navy	CVE-53	Bogue	Escort carrier		1943–1944	Became HMS Puncher.
Willapa Bay	US Navy	CVE-109	Commencement Bay	Escort carrier		—N/a	Renamed Cape Gloucester 1944 after construction began.
Windham Bay	US Navy	CVE-92	Casablanca	Escort carrier	CATOBAR	1944–1959	
Winjah	US Navy	CVE-54	Bogue	Escort carrier		—N/a	Became HMS Reaper.
Winjah Bay	US Navy	CVE-110	Commencement Bay	Escort carrier		—N/a	Renamed Salerno Bay 1943 before construction began.
Wolverine	US Navy	IX-64		Training carrier		1942–1945	Converted paddle-wheel steamer.
Woodcliff Bay	US Navy	CVE-93	Casablanca	Escort carrier	CATOBAR	—N/a	Renamed Makin Island 1943 before construction began.
Wright	US Navy	CVL-49	Saipan	Light carrier		1947–1970	
Yamashiro Maru	Japanese Army		Special 2TL Type	Escort carrier		1945–1945	Tanker conversion. Sunk by aircraft 17 February 1945
Yorktown	US Navy	CV-5	Yorktown	Aircraft carrier		1937–1942	Sunk 7 June 1942 at Midway after air and sub attacks.
Yorktown	US Navy	CV-10	Essex	Fleet carrier	CATOBAR	1943–1970	Ex-Bon Homme Richard. Museum at Mount Pleasant, SC
Zuihō	Japanese Navy		Zuihō	Light carrier		1940–1944	Converted oiler, sunk by aircraft at Leyte Gulf 25 October 1944
Zuikaku	Japanese Navy		Shōkaku	Fleet carrier		1941–1944	Sunk by aircraft at Leyte Gulf 25 October 1944
Zuiun Maru	Japanese Army		Special 2TL Type	Escort carrier		—N/a	1945 tanker conversion, never completed.

== See also ==
- List of active French Navy ships
- List of active Indian Navy ships
- List of active Italian Navy ships
- List of active Japan Maritime Self-Defense Force ships
- List of active Spanish Navy ships
- List of aircraft carrier classes of the United States Navy
- List of aircraft carriers by configuration
- List of aircraft carriers in service
- List of aircraft carriers of Germany
- List of aircraft carriers of Russia and the Soviet Union
- List of aircraft carriers of the Royal Navy
- List of aircraft carriers of the United States Navy
- List of amphibious warfare ships
- List of carrier-based aircraft
- List of current ships of the Royal Canadian Navy
- List of escort carriers of the Royal Navy
- List of escort carriers of the United States Navy
- List of seaplane carriers of the Royal Navy
- List of ships of the Imperial Japanese Navy
- List of sunken aircraft carriers
- People's Liberation Army Navy Surface Force
- Timeline for aircraft carrier service
