= PH 75 =

Military development program

Class overview
- Planned: 2
- Building: 0
- Completed: 0
- Canceled: 2
- Active: 0

General characteristics
- Displacement: 16,400 tons to 18,400 tons
- Length: 208 m (682 ft 5 in)
- Beam: 26.4 m (86 ft 7 in) (w.l.); 46 m (150 ft 11 in) (o.a.)
- Draft: 6.5 m (21 ft 4 in)
- Propulsion: CAS-230 nuclear reactor; 2 shafts; 65,000 shp (48,000 kW)
- Speed: 28 knots (52 km/h; 32 mph)
- Capacity: 1,000 troops
- Complement: 850 to 890
- Armament: 2 × Crotale SAM; 2 × 100 mm DP guns
- Aircraft carried: Up to 25 helicopters

PH 75 was a military development program in France aimed at designing a nuclear-powered amphibious assault ship during the 1970s. Design work was never completed by the time the project was cancelled in 1981.

== History ==
The role of providing air support for amphibious operations in the French Navy was left to the aging Arromanches, a World War II-era light carrier. PH 75 was envisioned as the replacement for the Arromanches. Nuclear propulsion was selected to allow the vessel to operate with fewer support vessels and at longer ranges. Other roles were added to the program including command, rescue, and anti-submarine warfare. Early plans were for completion of the first unit by 1981, but this proved unobtainable, and after several delays, the project was cancelled by 1988.

France instead chose to pursue a conventionally powered vessel to fulfill this role, termed a power projection ship, resulting in the development of the Mistral class which entered service in 2005. Meanwhile, France also developed a nuclear-powered aircraft carrier, the Charles de Gaulle.

== See also ==
- List of aircraft carriers
