= VMO-7 =

Observation squadron of the United States Marine Corps

Marine Observation Squadron 7
- No known insignia
- Active: 15 December 1944 – 16 November 1945
- Country: United States
- Branch: USMC
- Type: Observation squadron
- Garrison/HQ: Inactive
- Engagements: World War II * Battle of Okinawa

Marine Observation Squadron 7 (VMO-7) was an observation squadron of the United States Marine Corps during World War II. They were active for a year and a half during which time they saw action during the Battle of Okinawa. The squadron was quickly deactivated following the end of the war.

== History ==
VMO-7 was commissioned on December 15, 1944, at Marine Corps Base Quantico, Virginia. After a short period of training, the squadron moved to Marine Corps Air Station Ewa on February 27, 1945, sailing on board the British escort carrier HMS Ranee (D03). Another two months of training in Hawaii saw the squadron depart Pearl Harbor on April 17, 1945, and sail for Okinawa. The squadron filtered onto the island from May 7 to 11 and quickly began flights spotting targets for the III Amphibious Corps’ artillery. During the period between June 11 and 22, the squadron made 271 CASEVAC flights from a dirt strip in Naha taking 369 casualties back to hospitals in the rear areas. VMO-7 aircraft were engaged in combat operations on Okinawa until June 21, 1945. During the battle, the squadron flew 300 combat hours without losing a pilot or plane. The unit remained on the island for the rest of the war and was decommissioned on November 16, 1945.

== Awards ==
- Asiatic-Pacific Campaign Medal with one bronze star
- World War II Victory Medal

== See also ==
- United States Marine Corps Aviation
- List of United States Marine Corps aircraft squadrons
- List of decommissioned United States Marine Corps aircraft squadrons
