= USS Roi =

Casablanca-class escort carrier of the US Navy

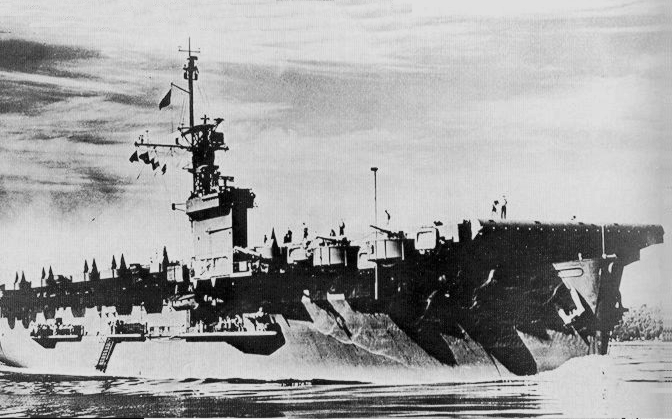
- USS Roi underway, date unknown

History

United States
- Name: Alava Bay; Roi
- Namesake: Alava Bay, Revillagigedo Island; Battle of Roi
- Ordered: as a Type S4-S2-BB3 hull, MCE hull 1140
- Awarded: 18 June 1942
- Builder: Kaiser Shipyards
- Laid down: 22 March 1944
- Launched: 2 June 1944
- Commissioned: 6 July 1944
- Decommissioned: 9 May 1946
- Stricken: 21 May 1946
- Identification: Hull symbol: CVE-103
- Honors and awards: 1 Battle star
- Fate: Sold for scrap, 31 December 1946

General characteristics
- Class & type: Casablanca-class escort carrier
- Displacement: 8,188 long tons (8,319 t) (standard); 10,902 long tons (11,077 t) (full load)
- Length: 512 ft 3 in (156.13 m) (oa); 490 ft (150 m) (wl); 474 ft (144 m) (fd)
- Beam: 65 ft 2 in (19.86 m); 108 ft (33 m) (extreme width)
- Draft: 20 ft 9 in (6.32 m) (max)
- Installed power: 4 × Babcock & Wilcox boilers; 9,000 shp (6,700 kW)
- Propulsion: 2 × Skinner Unaflow reciprocating steam engines; 2 × screws
- Speed: 19 knots (35 km/h; 22 mph)
- Range: 10,240 nmi (18,960 km; 11,780 mi) at 15 kn (28 km/h; 17 mph)
- Complement: Total: 910 – 916 officers and men; Embarked Squadron: 50 – 56; Ship's Crew: 860
- Armament: As designed: 1 × 5 in (127 mm)/38 cal dual-purpose gun; 4 × twin 40 mm (1.57 in) Bofors anti-aircraft guns; 12 × 20 mm (0.79 in) Oerlikon anti-aircraft cannons; Varied, ultimate armament: 1 × 5 in (127 mm)/38 cal dual-purpose gun; 8 × twin 40 mm (1.57 in) Bofors anti-aircraft guns; 20 × 20 mm (0.79 in) Oerlikon anti-aircraft cannons
- Aircraft carried: 27
- Aviation facilities: 1 × catapult; 2 × elevators

Service record
- Part of: United States Pacific Fleet (1944–1946)
- Operations: Operation Magic Carpet

USS Roi (CVE-103) was a Casablanca-class escort carrier of the United States Navy. She was named after the Battle of Roi, in which the United States captured the island of Roi-Namur. Built for service during World War II, the ship was launched in June 1944, commissioned in July, and acted as a transport and as a replenishment carrier. During the latter months of the war, she provided aircraft and supplies to the Fast Carrier Task Force, continuing until the end of the war. Postwar, she participated in Operation Magic Carpet. She was decommissioned in May 1946, and she was sold for scrapping in December.

== Design and description ==
A side profile of the design of Thetis Bay.

Roi was a Casablanca-class escort carrier, the most numerous type of aircraft carriers ever built. Built to stem heavy losses during the Battle of the Atlantic, they came into service in late 1943, by which time the U-boat threat was already in retreat. Although some did see service in the Atlantic, the majority were utilized in the Pacific, ferrying aircraft, providing logistics support, and conducting close air support for the island-hopping campaigns. The Casablanca-class carriers were built on the standardized Type S4-S2-BB3 hull, a lengthened variant of the Doyen-class hull, and specifically designed to be mass-produced using welded prefabricated sections. This allowed them to be produced at unprecedented speeds: the final ship of her class, Munda, was delivered to the Navy just 101 days after the laying of her keel.

Roi was 512 ft 3 in (156.13 m) long overall (490 ft (150 m) at the waterline), had a beam of 65 ft 2 in (19.86 m), and a draft of 20 ft 9 in (6.32 m). She displaced 8,188 long tons (8,319 t) standard, which increased to 10,902 long tons (11,077 t) with a full load. To carry out flight operations, the ship had a 257 ft (78 m) hangar deck and a 474 ft (144 m) flight deck. Her compact size necessitated the installation of an aircraft catapult at her bow, and there were two aircraft elevators to facilitate movement of aircraft between the flight and hangar deck: one each fore and aft.

She was powered by four Babcock & Wilcox Express D boilers that raised 285 psi (1,970 kPa) of steam at 577 °F (303 °C). The steam generated by these boilers fed two Skinner Unaflow reciprocating steam engines, delivering 9,000 hp (6,700 kW) to two propeller shafts. This allowed her to reach speeds of 19 kn (35 km/h; 22 mph), with a cruising range of 10,240 nmi (18,960 km; 11,780 mi) at 15 kn (28 km/h; 17 mph). For armament, one 5 in (127 mm)/38 caliber dual-purpose gun was mounted on the stern. Additional anti-aircraft defense was provided by eight Bofors 40 mm (1.57 in) anti-aircraft guns in single mounts and twelve Oerlikon 20 mm (0.79 in) cannons mounted around the perimeter of the deck. By 1945, Casablanca-class carriers had been modified to carry twenty Oerlikon cannons and sixteen Bofors guns; the doubling of the latter was accomplished by putting them into twin mounts. Sensors onboard consisted of a SG surface-search radar and a SK air-search radar.

Although Casablanca-class escort carriers were intended to function with a crew of 860 and an embarked squadron of 50 to 56, the exigencies of wartime often necessitated the inflation of the crew count. They were designed to operate with 27 aircraft, but the hangar deck could accommodate much more during transport or training missions. Because Roi was never utilized in a combat operation, she usually operated with about 60 aircraft on board, the maximum carrying capacity at which take-offs would still be possible.

== Construction ==
Her construction was awarded to Kaiser Shipbuilding Company, Vancouver, Washington under a Maritime Commission contract, on 18 June 1942, under the name Alava Bay, as part of a tradition which named escort carriers after bays or sounds in Alaska. She was renamed Roi, after the capture of the island Roi-Namur during the Battle of Kwajalein, as part of a new naval policy which named subsequent Casablanca-class carriers after naval or land engagements. The escort carrier was laid down on 3 March 1944, MC hull 1140, the forty-ninth of a series of fifty Casablanca-class escort carriers. She therefore received the classification symbol CVE-103. She was launched on 2 June 1944; sponsored by Mrs. William Sinton; transferred to the United States Navy and commissioned on 6 July 1944, with Captain Percy Haverly Lyon in command.

== Service history ==
=== World War II ===
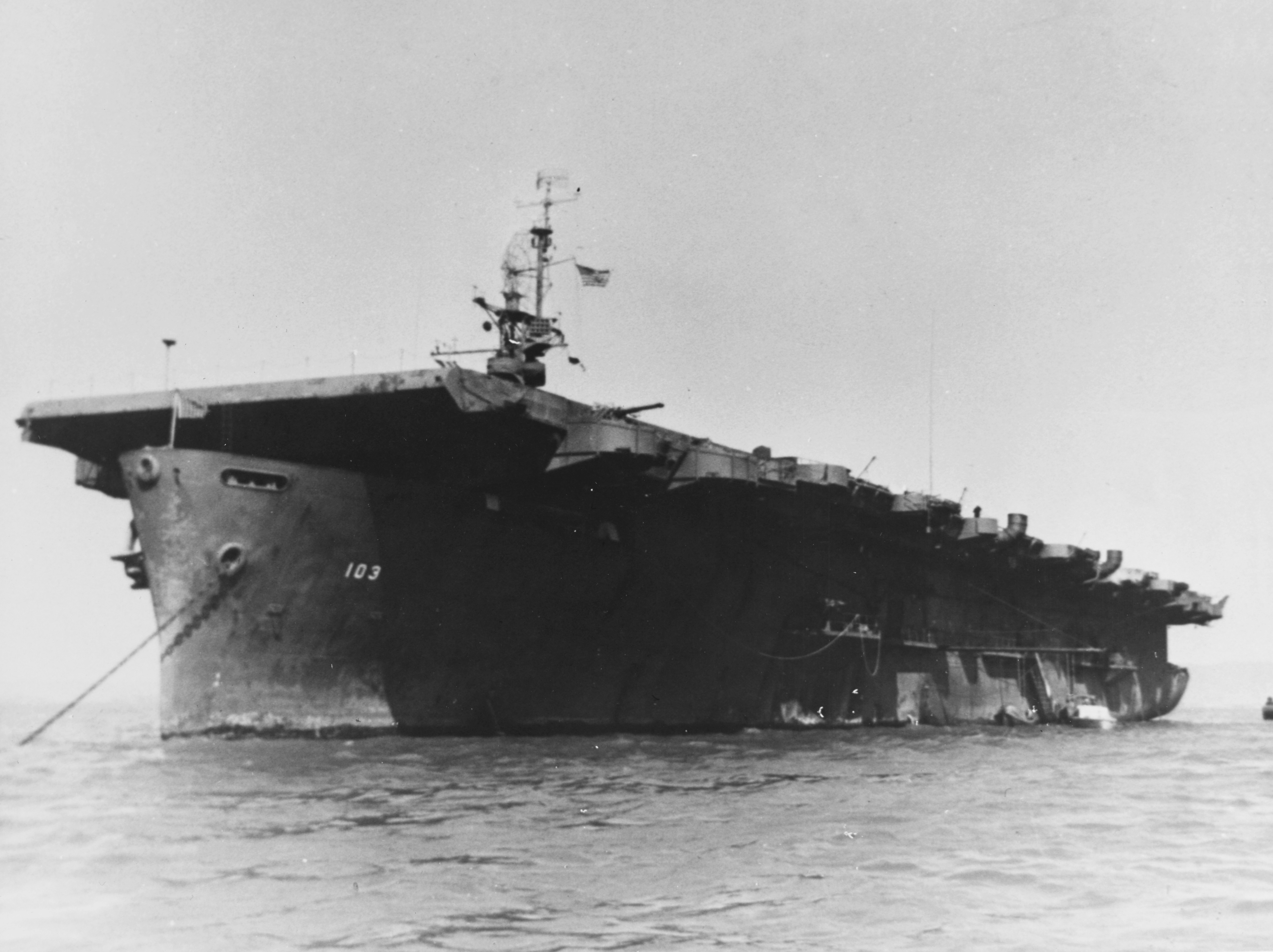
Roi at anchor, location unknown. Circa 1945.

Upon being commissioned, Roi underwent a shakedown cruise down the West Coast to San Diego. She then underwent several transport missions, first departing from San Diego on 13 August, carrying a load of 287 passengers and 71 aircraft bound for Manus Island and Espiritu Santo. She returned to port on 27 September, and conducted another transport run to Manus on 21 October. On 2 December, she made another transport run, making stops at Guam and Eniwetok. After completing her mission, she arrived at Alameda, California for overhaul. After overhaul was completed, she made two more round-trip transport missions to bases in the Marshalls and Mariana Islands. She then headed for Pearl Harbor, where she underwent training operations. There, she was also assigned to become a replenishment carrier supporting the frontline Fast Carrier Task Force, providing replacement aircraft, supplies, and fuel for the fleet carriers. The replenishment carrier fleet enabled the fast carriers to operate at sea for a sustained period of time without having to return to port to replenish.

After loading 61 replenishment aircraft, she sailed for Guam, where she joined Task Force 30.8, the replenishment escort carrier task group. She rendezvoused with the Fast Carrier Task Force (Task Group 38) on designated days, in order to replace losses sustained in operations against mainland Japan. She began operations on 4 July 1945, along with fellow escort carriers Admiralty Islands, Hollandia, and Thetis Bay. She rendezvoused with the fast carriers on 12 July, 16 July, and 20 July. After exhausting her replacement aircraft, she stopped at Guam on 21 July to replenish. She departed on 27 July, with a full load of 61 aircraft, and conducted rendezvous again with the fast carriers on 14 August. Shortly afterwards, while she was at sea, the Japanese surrender was announced. She then joined the main contingent of the Third Fleet, in support of the Occupation of Japan.

Following the end of the war, Roi joined the Operation Magic Carpet fleet, which repatriated U.S. servicemen from around the Pacific. She conducted several Magic Carpet runs throughout 1945 until she was released from the fleet. She then reported to Bremerton, Washington, where she was deactivated and decommissioned on 9 May 1946. She was struck from the Navy list on 21 May, and sold on 31 December to Zidell Machinery & Supply of Portland, Oregon for scrapping. Roi was awarded one battle star for her World War II service.

== Sources ==
=== Online sources ===
- "Roi (CVE-103)". Dictionary of American Naval Fighting Ships. Naval History and Heritage Command. 27 April 2016. Archived from the original on 10 November 2019. This article incorporates text from this source, which is in the public domain.
- Maksel, Rebecca (14 August 2012). "How Do You Name an Aircraft Carrier?". Air & Space/Smithsonian.
- Stubblebine, Daniel (June 2011). "Escort Carrier Makin Island (CVE-93)". ww2db.com.
- "World Aircraft Carriers List: US Escort Carriers, S4 Hulls". Hazegray.org. 14 December 1998. Archived from the original on 19 November 2021.

=== Bibliography ===
- Adcock, Al (1996), Escort Carriers in Action - Warships No. 9, Carrollton, Texas: Squadron/Signal Publications, ISBN 9780897473569
- Chesneau, Robert; Gardiner, Robert (1980), Conway's All the World's Fighting Ships 1922–1946, London, England: Naval Institute Press, ISBN 9780870219139
- Friedman, Norman (1983), U.S. Aircraft Carriers: An Illustrated Design History, Annapolis, Maryland: Naval Institute Press, ISBN 9780870217395
- Ross, Al (1993), The Escort Carrier Gambier Bay, Anatomy of the Ship, London, England: Conway Maritime Press, ISBN 9781557502353
- Y'Blood, William (2012), The Little Giants: U.S. Escort Carriers Against Japan, Annapolis, Maryland: Naval Institute Press, ISBN 9781612512471
