= Avenger-class escort carrier =

Aircraft carrier class of the US & Royal Navy

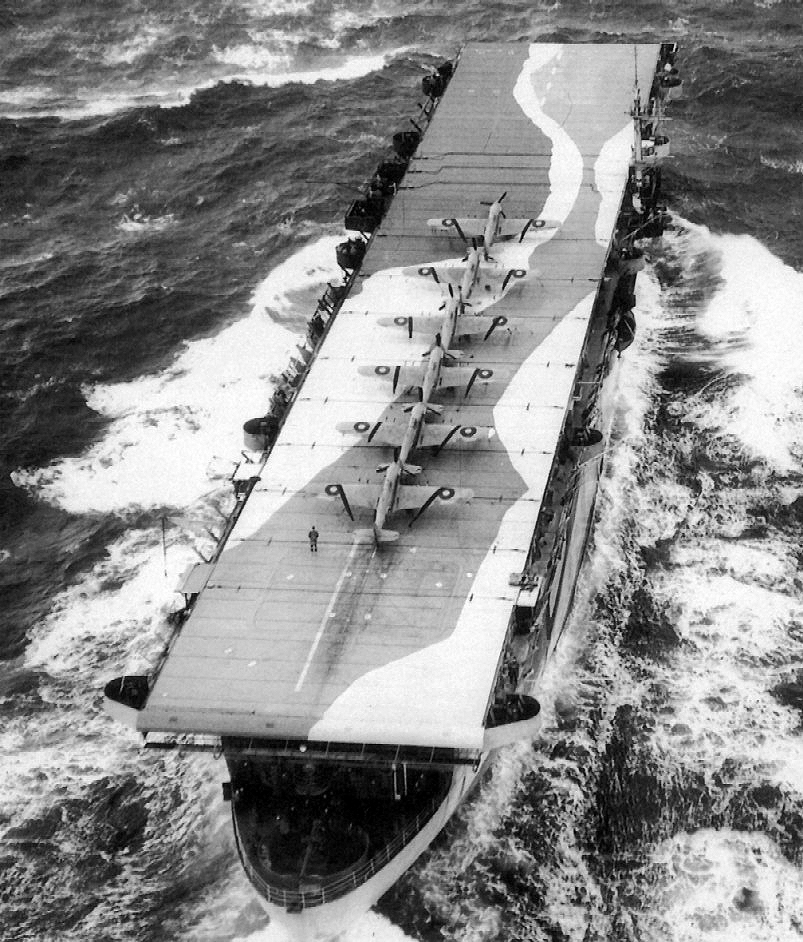
- HMS Avenger

Class overview
- Name: Avenger class
- Builders: Sun Shipbuilding Company
- Operators: Royal Navy; United States Navy; French Navy
- Preceded by: Long Island class
- Succeeded by: Attacker class (RN), Bogue class (USN)
- Built: 1941–1942
- Planned: 4
- Completed: 4
- Lost: 2

General characteristics
- Type: Escort carrier
- Displacement: 8,200 long tons (8,332 t)
- Length: 492.25 ft (150.04 m)
- Beam: 66.25 ft 6 in (20.35 m)
- Draught: 23.25 ft (7.09 m)
- Installed power: 8,500 shp (6,300 kW)
- Propulsion: 4 × diesel engines; 1 × shaft
- Speed: 16.5 kn (19.0 mph; 30.6 km/h)
- Complement: 555
- Sensors & processing systems: SC radar
- Armament: 3 × 4-inch DP anti-aircraft guns in single mounts; 15 × 20 mm anti-aircraft cannons in single or twin mounts
- Aircraft carried: 15
- Aviation facilities: Hangar 190 ft × 47 ft (58 m × 14 m); one 42 ft × 34 ft (13 m × 10 m) lift; 9 × arrestor wires
- Notes: Class only had a half hangar for aircraft stowage

The Avenger-class escort carrier was a class of escort carriers comprising three ships in service with the Royal Navy during the Second World War and one ship of the class in the United States Navy called the Charger Type of 1942-class escort carrier. All three were originally American type C3 merchant ships in the process of being built at the Sun Shipbuilding and Drydock Company Chester, Pennsylvania. The ships laid down in 1939 and 1940 were launched and delivered to the Royal Navy by 1942 under the Lend-Lease agreement.

The ships had a complement of 555 men and an overall length of 492.25 feet (150.04 m), a beam of 66.25 feet (20.19 m) and a height of 23.25 ft (7.09 m). Their displacement was 8,200 long tons (8,332 t) at normal load and 9,000 long tons (9,144 t) at deep load. Propulsion was provided by four diesel engines connected to one shaft giving 8,500 brake horsepower (6,300 kW), which could propel the ships at 16.5 knots (30.6 km/h; 19.0 mph).

Aircraft facilities were a small combined bridge–flight control on the starboard side and above the 410 feet (120 m) long wooden flight deck, one aircraft lift 43 by 34 feet (13 m × 10 m), one aircraft catapult and nine arrestor wires. Aircraft could be housed in the 190 by 47 feet (58 m × 14 m) half hangar below the flight deck. Armament comprised three single mounted 4-inch dual purpose anti-aircraft guns and fifteen 20 mm cannons on single or twin mounts. They had the capacity for fifteen aircraft which would typically be a mixture of Grumman Martlet or Hawker Sea Hurricane fighter aircraft and Fairey Swordfish or Grumman Avenger anti-submarine aircraft. The three ships in the class were HMS Avenger, HMS Biter and HMS Dasher. A fourth ship, USS Charger was built at the same time to the same design but was commissioned in the U.S. Navy.

== See also ==
- List of ship classes of the Second World War
