= MV Empire MacCabe =

World War II merchant ship of the United Kingdom

History

United Kingdom
- Name: Empire MacCabe
- Owner: Ministry of War Transport
- Operator: British Tanker Co. Ltd.
- Builder: Swan Hunter & Wigham Richardson, Wallsend
- Launched: 18 May 1943
- Renamed: British Escort in 1946; Easthill Escort in 1959
- Honours and awards: North Atlantic 1943-1945
- Fate: Scrapped Hong Kong 1962

General characteristics
- Tonnage: 8,908 GRT
- Length: 463 ft (141 m) (pp) 485 ft 9 in (148.06 m) (oa)
- Beam: 61 ft 9 in (18.82 m)
- Depth: 27 ft 6 in (8.38 m)
- Propulsion: Diesel; one shaft; 3,300 bhp
- Speed: 11 knots (20 km/h)
- Complement: 110
- Armament: 1 × 4 in (100 mm); 8 × 20 mm
- Aircraft carried: Four Fairey Swordfish

MV Empire MacCabe was a British oil tanker converted to a merchant aircraft carrier (or MAC ship), during World War II. Managed by the British Tanker Company, she served on North Atlantic convoy duty during the later stages of the Battle of the Atlantic before returning to commercial tanker service after the war.

MV Empire MacCabe was built by Swan Hunter, Wallsend under order from the Ministry of War Transport. She entered service as a MAC ship in December 1943, however only her air crew and the necessary maintenance staff were naval personnel. She was operated by the British Tanker Company.

She returned to merchant service as an oil tanker in 1946 and was later renamed British Escort and Easthill Escort before being scrapped in Hong Kong in 1962.

== Design and construction ==
Empire MacCabe was built by Swan Hunter, launched on 18 May 1943, and completed in November 1943. She measured 8,477 GRT and 12,450 deadweight tons, was 469.8 feet (143.2 m) long with a beam of 61.9 feet (18.9 m), and was powered by a four-cylinder Doxford-type oil engine driving a single screw for a service speed of 11.5 knots.

== Service ==
Completed as a MAC ship in November 1943, Empire MacCabe remained under Ministry of War Transport ownership with the British Tanker Company as manager. Her first recorded convoy service was with convoy ON 220 in January 1944, where the Arnold Hague convoy database lists her as a MAC ship on her first voyage. She later appeared in convoy SC 153 in February 1944 and in convoys HX 292 and HX 298 in May and July 1944.

Royal Navy convoy instructions issued on 22 August 1944 assigned Empire MacCabe and Macoma to outbound convoy ONS 254. Fleet Air Arm station records for RCAF Dartmouth in Nova Scotia also show repeated disembarkations from Empire MacCabe by 836 Naval Air Squadron's N Flight during 1944, indicating her continued employment on Atlantic convoy operations. On 1 June 1945 the Royal Navy war diary recorded her arrival at Halifax from outbound convoy ON 303.

== Post-war career ==
In 1946 ownership of the ship was transferred to the British Tanker Company and she was renamed British Escort. In 1959 she was renamed Easthill Escort, and in 1960 passed to River Line Ltd of Bermuda under the management of Moller interests in Hong Kong. She was broken up at Hong Kong on 13 March 1962.
