= HMS Ranee =

American escort carrier transferred to the Royal Navy

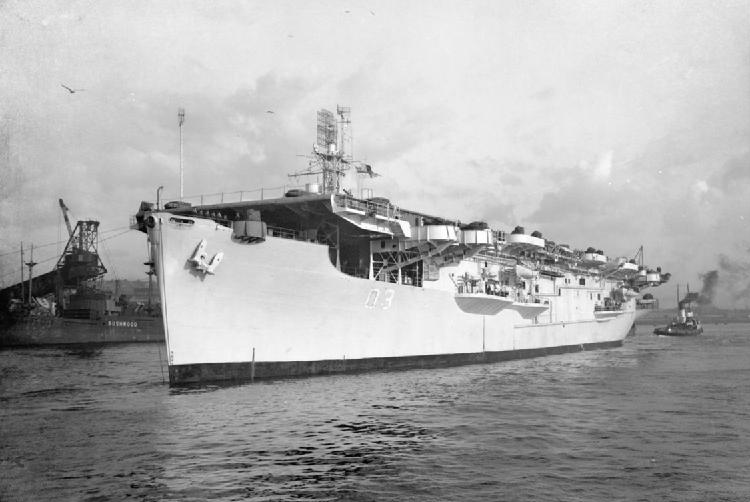
- Niantic as Ranee in November 1945

History

United States
- Name: USS Niantic
- Namesake: Niantic, Connecticut; Niantic River in Connecticut; Niantic Bay in Connectivut
- Builder: Seattle-Tacoma Shipbuilding Corporation
- Laid down: 5 January 1943
- Launched: 2 June 1943
- Fate: Transferred to Royal Navy 8 November 1943

United Kingdom
- Name: HMS Ranee
- Commissioned: 8 November 1943
- Decommissioned: 22 January 1947
- Identification: Pennant number:D03
- Fate: Sold as a merchant ship; scrapped 1975

General characteristics
- Class & type: Bogue-class escort carrier (USA); Ruler-class escort carrier (UK)
- Displacement: 7,800 tons
- Length: 495 ft 8 in (151.08 m)
- Beam: 69 ft 6 in (21.18 m)
- Draught: 26 ft (7.9 m)
- Speed: 18 knots (33 km/h)
- Complement: 890 officers and men
- Armament: 2 × 4"/50, 5"/38 or 5"/51 guns; 20 × twin 40 mm Bofors
- Aircraft carried: 24

HMS Ranee (D03) was a U. S.-built escort carrier that served in the Royal Navy during World War Ii. The ship's keel was laid down under a Maritime Commission contract at the Tacoma, Washington yard of the Seattle-Tacoma Shipbuilding Corporation on 5 January 1943. She was originally given a prospective U. S. Navy name, USS Niantic, and an initial designation of AVG-46 (later changed to ACV-46, and, by the time of her commissioning, to CVE-46). The vessel was launched on 2 June 1943, sponsored by Mrs. Ray V. Blanco, and was commissioned into the U. S. Navy, as Niantic, on 8 November. Later that day she was transferred to the Royal Navy under Lend-Lease, decommissioned by the U. S. Navy, and recommissioned as HMS Ranee (D03)

As one of the 38 converted C3 escort carriers transferred to the United Kingdom, Ranee joined the merchant aircraft carriers guarding the Atlantic convoy routes. Assigned to the Western Approaches, her aircraft helped to turn the tables on foraging U-boats in the North Atlantic and also assisted in operations to close their northern transit into the Atlantic and track them down in the Bay of Biscay. On 27 February 1945 she sailed from San Diego with USMC squadron VMO-7 embarked for Pearl Harbor. Serving with Training Squadron, Western Approaches, at the end of 1945, she was returned to US custody at Norfolk, Virginia on 21 November 1946. She was declared not essential to the defense of the US, and struck from the Navy List on 22 January 1947. She was sold into merchant service 9 June 1947 to the Waterman Steamship Corporation, in Mobile, Alabama as Friesland (later Pacific Breeze). She was sold for scrap in Taiwan in 1974.

== Design and description ==
These ships were larger and had a greater aircraft capacity than all the preceding American built escort carriers in British service. They were also all laid down as escort carriers and not converted merchant ships. All the ships had a complement of 646 men and an overall length of 492 feet 3 inches (150.0 m), a beam of 69 feet 6 inches (21.2 m) and a draught of 25 ft 6 in (7.8 m). Propulsion was provided by two boilers connected to a steam turbine, which in turn drove one shaft giving 9,350 shaft horsepower (6,970 kW); it could propel the ship at 16.5 knots (30.6 km/h; 19.0 mph).

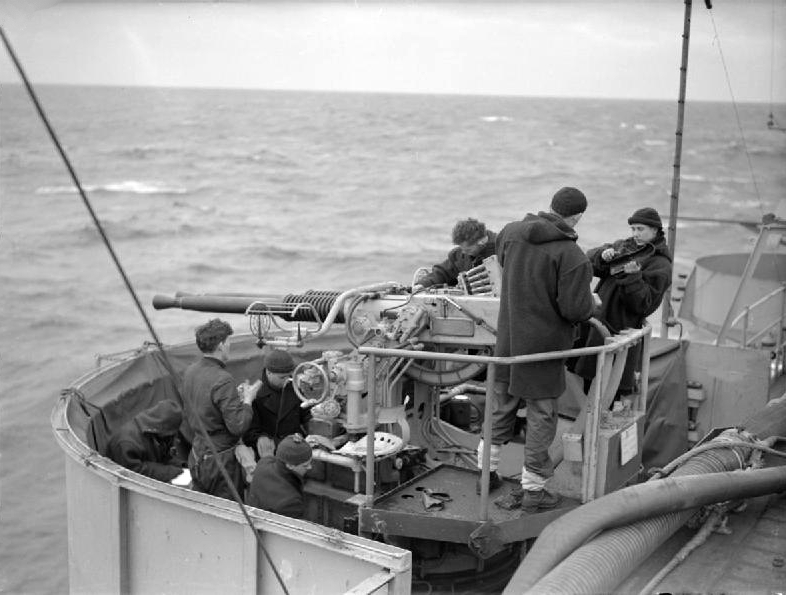
A typical twin 40 mm Bofors anti-aircraft gun

Aircraft facilities were a small combined bridge/flight control on the starboard side, two aircraft lifts 43 by 34 feet (13.1 by 10.4 m), one aircraft catapult and nine arrestor wires. Aircraft could be housed in the 260 by 62 foot (79.2 by 18.9 m) hangar below the flight deck. The ship's armament comprised: two 4"/50, 5"/38 or 5"/51 dual purpose guns in single mounts, sixteen 40 mm Bofors anti-aircraft guns in twin mounts and twenty 20 mm Oerlikon anti-aircraft cannon in single mounts. She had a maximum aircraft capacity of twenty-four aircraft which could be a mixture of Grumman Martlet, Vought F4U Corsair or Hawker Sea Hurricane fighter aircraft and Fairey Swordfish or Grumman Avenger anti-submarine torpedo bombers.

== Sources ==
- Cocker, Maurice (2008). Aircraft-Carrying Ships of the Royal Navy. Stroud, Gloucestershire: The History Press. ISBN 978-0-7524-4633-2.
