= List of escort carriers of the United States Navy =

Ships of the United States Navy

Ships in current service
- Current ships

Ships grouped alphabetically
- A–B; C; D–F; G–H; I–K; L; M; N–O; P; Q–R; S; T–V; W–Z

Ships grouped by type
- Aircraft carriers; Airships; Amphibious warfare ships; Auxiliaries; Battlecruisers; Battleships; Cruisers; Destroyers; Destroyer escorts; Destroyer leaders; Escort carriers; Frigates; Hospital ships; Littoral combat ships; Mine warfare vessels; Monitors; Oilers; Patrol vessels; Registered civilian vessels; Sailing frigates; Steam frigates; Steam gunboats; Ships of the line; Sloops of war; Submarines; Torpedo boats; Torpedo retrievers; Unclassified miscellaneous; Yard and district craft

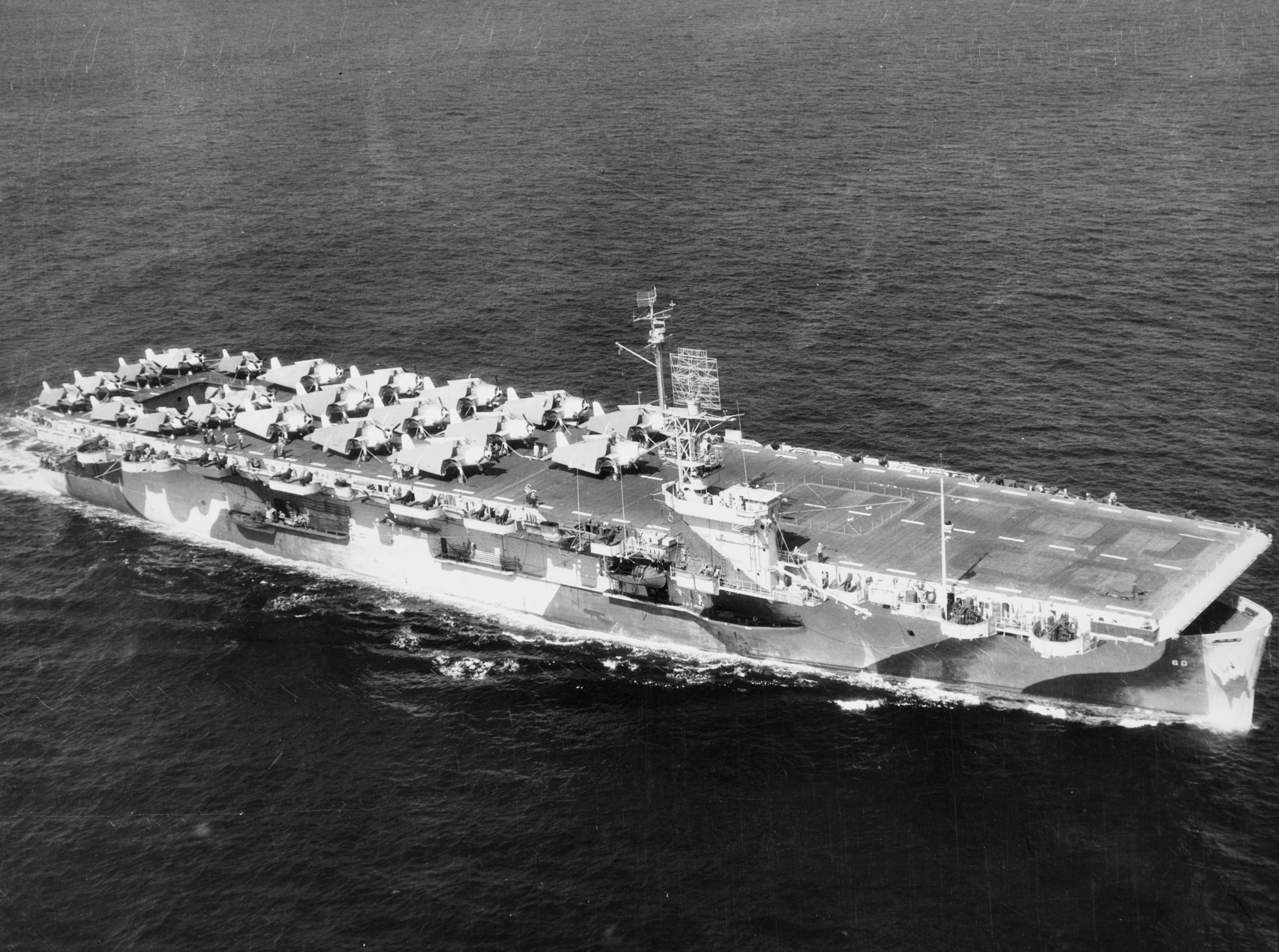
USS Guadalcanal (CVE-60)

The United States Navy had a sizable fleet of escort aircraft carriers during World War II and the early Cold War era that followed.

Name	Hull number	Class	Laid Down	Launched	Commissioned	Notes
Long Island	CVE-1	Long Island	7 July 1939	11 January 1940	2 June 1941	Built as Mormacmail (I)
Unnamed	CVE-2		6 December 1930	5 December 1931		Cancelled conversion of SS Manhattan (1931)
Unnamed	CVE-3		20 January 1931	20 August 1932		Cancelled conversion of SS Washington
Unnamed	CVE-4		22 August 1938	31 August 1939		Cancelled conversion of SS America (1939)
Unnamed	CVE-5			1928		Cancelled conversion of MS Kungsholm (1928)
Unnamed	BAVG-1	Avenger	7 June 1939	14 December 1939	17 November 1941	Built as Mormacland Became HMS Archer (D78)
Unnamed	BAVG-2	Avenger	28 November 1939	27 November 1940	2 March 1942	Built as Rio Hudson Became HMS Avenger (D14) Sunk by U-155, 15 November 1942
Unnamed	BAVG-3	Avenger	28 December 1939	18 December 1940	6 May 1942	Built as Rio Parana Became HMS Biter (D97)
Unnamed	BAVG-4	Charger	19 January 1940	1 March 1941	2 October 1941	Built as Rio de la Plata Became HMS Charger (D27) Returned to USN, 4 October 1941; Redesignated USS Charger (CVE-30), 20 August 1942
Unnamed	BAVG-5	Avenger	14 March 1940	12 April 1941	2 July 1942	Built as Rio de Janeiro Became HMS Dasher (D37); Sunk by aviation fuel explosion, 27 March 1943
Unnamed	BAVG-6	Attacker	3 November 1941	7 March 1942	31 January 1943	Built as Mormacmail (II) Became HMS Tracker (D24)
Altamaha	CVE-6	Attacker	15 April 1941	4 April 1942	31 October 1942	Built as Mormacmail (III) Became HMS Battler (D18)
Barnes	CVE-7	Attacker	17 April 1941	27 September 1941	30 September 1942	Built as Steel Artisan Became HMS Attacker (D02)
Block Island	CVE-8	Attacker	15 May 1941	22 May 1942	9 January 1943	Built as Mormacpenn Became HMS Hunter (D80)
Bogue	CVE-9	Bogue	1 October 1941	15 January 1942	26 September 1942	Built as Steel Advocate
Breton	CVE-10	Attacker	28 June 1941	15 February 1943	9 April 1943	Built as Mormacgulf Became HMS Chaser (D32)
Card	CVE-11	Bogue	27 October 1941	27 February 1942	8 November 1942	
Copahee	CVE-12	Bogue	18 June 1941	21 October 1941	15 June 1942	
Core	CVE-13	Bogue	2 January 1942	15 May 1942	10 December 1942	
Croatan	CVE-14	Attacker	5 September 1941	4 April 1942	20 February 1943	Became HMS Fencer (D64)
Hamlin	CVE-15	Attacker	6 October 1941	5 March 1942	21 December 1942	Became HMS Stalker (D91)
Nassau	CVE-16	Bogue	27 November 1941	4 April 1942	20 August 1942	
St. George	CVE-17	Attacker	31 July 1941	18 July 1942	14 June 1943	Became HMS Pursuer (D73)
Altamaha	CVE-18	Bogue	19 December 1941	22 May 1942	15 September 1942	
Prince William	CVE-19	Attacker	15 December 1941	7 May 1942	28 April 1943	Became HMS Striker (D12)
Barnes	CVE-20	Bogue	19 January 1942	2 May 1942	20 February 1943	
Block Island	CVE-21	Bogue	19 January 1942	1 May 1942	8 March 1943	
Unnamed	CVE-22	Attacker	20 February 1942	20 June 1942	7 April 1943	Became HMS Searcher (D40)
Breton	CVE-23	Bogue	25 February 1942	27 June 1942	12 April 1943	
Unnamed	CVE-24	Attacker	11 April 1942	16 July 1942	25 April 1943	Became HMS Ravager (D70)
Croatan	CVE-25	Bogue	15 April 1942	1 August 1942	28 April 1943	
Sangamon	CVE-26	Sangamon	13 March 1939	4 November 1939	25 August 1942	Lead ship of her class (converted from Cimarron-class oiler)
Suwannee	CVE-27	Sangamon	3 June 1938	4 March 1939	24 September 1942	
Chenango	CVE-28	Sangamon	10 July 1938	1 April 1939	19 September 1942	
Santee	CVE-29	Sangamon	31 May 1938	4 March 1939	24 August 1942	
Charger	CVE-30	Charger	19 January 1940	1 March 1941	3 March 1942	Same ship as "BAVG-4" and HMS Charger (D27)
Prince William	CVE-31	Bogue	18 May 1942	23 August 1942	9 April 1943	Last ship, first group of Bogue-class, sometimes referred to as Prince William-class
Chatham	CVE-32	Ruler	25 May 1942	19 September 1942	11 August 1943	Became HMS Slinger (D26) First ship, second group of Bogue-class
Glacier	CVE-33	Ruler	9 June 1942	7 September 1942	28 October 1943	Became HMS Atheling (D51)
Pybus	CVE-34	Ruler	23 June 1942	7 October 1942	6 August 1943	Became HMS Emperor (D98)
Baffins	CVE-35	Ruler	18 July 1942	18 October 1942	20 July 1943	Became HMS Ameer (D01)
Bolinas	CVE-36	Ruler	3 August 1942	11 November 1942	2 August 1943	Became HMS Begum (D38)
Bastian	CVE-37	Ruler	25 August 1942	15 December 1942	4 August 1943	Became HMS Trumpeter (D09)
Carnegie	CVE-38	Ruler	9 September 1942	30 December 1942	12 August 1943	Became HMS Empress (D42)
Cordova	CVE-39	Ruler	22 September 1942	30 January 1943	25 August 1943	Became HMS Khedive (D62)
Delgada	CVE-40	Ruler	9 October 1942	20 February 1943	20 November 1943	Became HMS Speaker (D90)
Edisto	CVE-41	Ruler	20 October 1942	22 March 1943	7 September 1943	Became HMS Nabob (D77)
Estero	CVE-42	Ruler	31 October 1942	22 March 1943	3 November 1943	Became HMS Premier (D23)
Jamaica	CVE-43	Ruler	13 November 1942	21 April 1943	27 September 1943	Became HMS Shah (D21)
Keweenaw	CVE-44	Ruler	27 November 1942	6 May 1943	25 October 1943	Became HMS Patroller (D07)
Prince	CVE-45	Ruler	17 December 1942	18 May 1943	17 January 1944	Became HMS Rajah (D10)
Niantic	CVE-46	Ruler	5 January 1943	2 June 1943	8 November 1943	Became HMS Ranee (D03)
Perdido	CVE-47	Ruler	1 February 1943	16 June 1943	31 January 1944	Became HMS Trouncer (D85)
Sunset	CVE-48	Ruler	23 February 1943	15 July 1943	19 November 1943	Became HMS Thane (D48)
St. Andrews	CVE-49	Ruler	12 March 1943	2 August 1943	7 December 1943	Became HMS Queen (D19)
St. Joseph	CVE-50	Ruler	25 March 1943	21 August 1943	22 December 1943	Became HMS Ruler (D72)
St. Simon	CVE-51	Ruler	26 April 1943	9 September 1943	31 December 1943	Became HMS Arbiter (D31)
Vermillion	CVE-52	Ruler	10 May 1943	27 September 1943	20 January 1944	Became HMS Smiter (D55)
Willapa	CVE-53	Ruler	21 May 1943	8 November 1943	5 February 1944	Became HMS Puncher (D79)
Winjah	CVE-54	Ruler	5 June 1943	22 November 1943	18 February 1944	Became HMS Reaper (D82), last ship of Bogue-class
Casablanca	CVE-55	Casablanca	3 November 1942	5 April 1943	8 July 1943	Lead ship of her class
Liscome Bay	CVE-56	Casablanca	9 December 1942	19 April 1943	7 August 1943	
Anzio	CVE-57	Casablanca	1 May 1943	27 August 1943	5 August 1946	Originally named Alikula Bay, commissioned as Coral Sea (1943-1944), renamed Anzio (1944-1959)
Corregidor	CVE-58	Casablanca	17 December 1942	12 May 1943	31 August 1943	
Mission Bay	CVE-59	Casablanca	28 December 1942	26 May 1943	13 September 1943	
Guadalcanal	CVE-60	Casablanca	5 January 1943	5 June 1943	25 September 1943	
Manila Bay	CVE-61	Casablanca	15 January 1943	10 July 1943	5 October 1943	
Natoma Bay	CVE-62	Casablanca	17 January 1943	20 July 1943	14 October 1943	
Midway	CVE-63	Casablanca	23 January 1943	17 August 1943	23 October 1943	Originally named Chapin Bay, commissioned as Midway (1943-1944), renamed St. Lo (1944)
Tripoli	CVE-64	Casablanca	1 February 1943	13 July 1943	31 October 1943	
Wake Island	CVE-65	Casablanca	6 February 1943	15 September 1943	7 November 1943	
White Plains	CVE-66	Casablanca	11 February 1943	27 September 1943	15 November 1943	
Solomons	CVE-67	Casablanca	19 March 1943	6 October 1943	21 November 1943	
Kalinin Bay	CVE-68	Casablanca	26 April 1943	15 October 1943	27 November 1943	
Kasaan Bay	CVE-69	Casablanca	May 1943	24 October 1943	4 December 1943	Laid down as Type S4-S2-BB3 oiler, completed as CVE-69
Fanshaw Bay	CVE-70	Casablanca	18 May 1943	1 November 1943	9 December 1943	
Kitkun Bay	CVE-71	Casablanca	3 May 1943	8 November 1943	15 December 1943	
Tulagi	CVE-72	Casablanca	7 June 1943	15 November 1943	21 December 1943	
Gambier Bay	CVE-73	Casablanca	10 July 1943	22 November 1943	28 December 1943	Only American aircraft carrier sunk by enemy surface gunfire during World War II at the Battle off Samar.
Nehenta Bay	CVE-74	Casablanca	20 July 1943	28 November 1943	3 January 1944	
Hoggatt Bay	CVE-75	Casablanca	17 August 1943	4 December 1943	11 January 1944	
Kadashan Bay	CVE-76	Casablanca	2 September 1943	11 December 1943	18 January 1944	
Marcus Island	CVE-77	Casablanca	15 September 1943	16 December 1943	26 January 1944	
Savo Island	CVE-78	Casablanca	27 September 1943	22 December 1943	3 February 1944	
Ommaney Bay	CVE-79	Casablanca	6 October 1943	29 December 1943	11 February 1944	
Petrof Bay	CVE-80	Casablanca	15 October 1943	5 January 1944	18 February 1944	
Rudyerd Bay	CVE-81	Casablanca	24 October 1943	12 January 1944	25 February 1944	
Saginaw Bay	CVE-82	Casablanca	1 November 1943	19 January 1944	2 March 1944	
Sargent Bay	CVE-83	Casablanca	8 November 1943	31 January 1944	9 March 1944	
Shamrock Bay	CVE-84	Casablanca	15 March 1943	4 February 1944	15 March 1944	
Shipley Bay	CVE-85	Casablanca	22 November 1943	12 February 1944	21 March 1944	
Sitkoh Bay	CVE-86	Casablanca	23 November 1943	19 February 1944	28 March 1944	
Steamer Bay	CVE-87	Casablanca	4 December 1943	26 February 1944	4 April 1944	
Cape Esperance	CVE-88	Casablanca	11 December 1943	3 March 1944	9 April 1944	Name changed from Tananek Bay 6 November 1943
Takanis Bay	CVE-89	Casablanca	16 December 1943	10 March 1944	15 April 1944	
Thetis Bay	CVE-90	Casablanca	22 December 1943	16 March 1944	12 April 1944	
Makassar Strait	CVE-91	Casablanca	29 December 1943	22 March 1944	27 April 1944	
Windham Bay	CVE-92	Casablanca	5 January 1944	29 March 1944	3 May 1944	
Makin Island	CVE-93	Casablanca	12 January 1944	5 April 1944	9 May 1944	
Lunga Point	CVE-94	Casablanca	19 January 1944	11 April 1944	14 May 1944	
Bismarck Sea	CVE-95	Casablanca	31 January 1944	17 April 1944	20 May 1944	
Salamaua	CVE-96	Casablanca	4 February 1944	22 April 1944	26 May 1944	Originally named Anguilla Bay
Hollandia	CVE-97	Casablanca	12 February 1944	28 April 1944	1 June 1944	
Kwajalein	CVE-98	Casablanca	19 February 1944	4 May 1944	7 June 1944	
Admiralty Islands	CVE-99	Casablanca	26 February 1944	10 May 1944	13 June 1944	
Bougainville	CVE-100	Casablanca	3 March 1944	16 May 1944	18 June 1944	
Matanikau	CVE-101	Casablanca	10 March 1944	22 May 1944	24 June 1944	
Attu	CVE-102	Casablanca	16 March 1944	27 May 1944	30 June 1944	
Roi	CVE-103	Casablanca	22 March 1944	2 June 1944	6 July 1944	
Munda	CVE-104	Casablanca	29 March 1944	27 May 1944	8 July 1944	Last ship of Casablanca-class
Commencement Bay	CVE-105	Commencement Bay	23 September 1943	9 May 1944	27 November 1944	Lead ship of her class
Block Island	CVE-106	Commencement Bay	25 October 1943	10 June 1944	30 December 1944	
Gilbert Islands	CVE-107	Commencement Bay	29 November 1943	20 July 1944	5 February 1945	
Kula Gulf	CVE-108	Commencement Bay	16 December 1943	15 August 1944	12 May 1945	
Cape Gloucester	CVE-109	Commencement Bay	10 January 1944	12 September 1944	5 March 1945	
Salerno Bay	CVE-110	Commencement Bay	7 February 1944	26 September 1944	19 May 1945	
Vella Gulf	CVE-111	Commencement Bay	7 March 1944	19 October 1944	9 April 1945	
Siboney	CVE-112	Commencement Bay	1 April 1944	9 November 1944	14 May 1945	Laid down as Frosty Bay, renamed Siboney 26 April 1944
Puget Sound	CVE-113	Commencement Bay	12 May 1944	20 September 1944	18 June 1945	
Rendova	CVE-114	Commencement Bay	15 June 1944	29 December 1944	22 October 1945	
Bairoko	CVE-115	Commencement Bay	25 July 1944	25 January 1945	16 July 1945	
Badoeng Strait	CVE-116	Commencement Bay	18 August 1944	15 February 1945	14 November 1945	
Saidor	CVE-117	Commencement Bay	29 September 1944	17 March 1945	4 September 1945	
Sicily	CVE-118	Commencement Bay	23 October 1944	14 April 1945	27 February 1946	
Point Cruz	CVE-119	Commencement Bay	4 December 1944	18 May 1945	16 October 1945	
Mindoro	CVE-120	Commencement Bay	2 January 1945	27 June 1945	4 December 1945	
Rabaul	CVE-121	Commencement Bay	29 January 1945	14 June 1945		Acquired by the Navy 30 August 1946, never commissioned.
Palau	CVE-122	Commencement Bay	19 February 1945	6 August 1945	15 January 1946	
Tinian	CVE-123	Commencement Bay	20 March 1945	5 September 1945		Acquired by the Navy 30 July 1946, never commissioned.
Bastogne	CVE-124	Commencement Bay	2 April 1945			Laid down, cancelled before launch
Eniwetok	CVE-125	Commencement Bay	20 April 1945			Laid down, cancelled before launch
Lingayen	CVE-126	Commencement Bay	1 May 1945			Laid down, cancelled before launch
Okinawa	CVE-127	Commencement Bay	22 May 1945			Laid down, cancelled before launch
Unnamed	CVE-128	Commencement Bay				Cancelled
Unnamed	CVE-129	Commencement Bay				Cancelled
Unnamed	CVE-130	Commencement Bay				Cancelled
Unnamed	CVE-131	Commencement Bay				Cancelled
Unnamed	CVE-132	Commencement Bay				Cancelled
Unnamed	CVE-133	Commencement Bay				Cancelled
Unnamed	CVE-134	Commencement Bay				Cancelled
Unnamed	CVE-135	Commencement Bay				Cancelled
Unnamed	CVE-136	Commencement Bay				Cancelled
Unnamed	CVE-137	Commencement Bay				Cancelled
Unnamed	CVE-138	Commencement Bay				Cancelled
Unnamed	CVE-139	Commencement Bay				Cancelled / Last ship of Commencement Bay-class

== See also ==
- List of aircraft carriers of the United States Navy
- List of aircraft carrier classes of the United States Navy
- List of United States Navy ships
- List of United States Navy losses in World War II § Escort aircraft carriers (CVE) - abbreviated list
- List of U.S. Navy ships sunk or damaged in action during World War II § Aircraft carrier, escort (CVE) - detailed list
- List of aircraft carriers
- List of aircraft carriers in service
- Timeline for aircraft carrier service
- List of aircraft carriers by configuration
- List of sunken aircraft carriers
- List of amphibious warfare ships
- List of escort aircraft carriers of the Royal Navy
- List of seaplane carriers of the Royal Navy

== Notes and references ==
- The Ships and Aircraft of the U.S. Fleet, by James C. Fahey, Associate, United States Naval Institute, 1945 (Victory Edition)
