= List of escort carriers of the Royal Navy =

The escort aircraft carrier, also called a "jeep carrier" or "baby flattop" in the US Navy or "Woolworth Carrier" by the Royal Navy, was a small and slow type of aircraft carrier used by the Royal Navy in the Second World War. They were typically half the length and one-third the displacement of the larger fleet carriers. While they were slower, less armed, unarmoured and carried fewer aircraft, they were less expensive and could be built more quickly. This was their principal advantage, as escort carriers could be completed in greater numbers as a stop-gap when fleet carriers were scarce. The lack of protection made escort carriers particularly vulnerable and several were sunk with great loss of life. The light carrier (hull classification symbol CVL) was a similar concept to escort carriers in most respects, but they were designed for higher speeds for deployment with fleet carriers.

Escort carriers were too slow to keep up with the main forces consisting of fleet carriers, battleships, and cruisers. Instead, they were used to defend convoys from enemy threats such as submarines and planes. In the invasions of mainland Europe and Pacific islands, escort carriers provided air support to ground forces during amphibious operations. Escort carriers also served as backup aircraft transports for fleet carriers and ferried aircraft of all military services to points of delivery.

In addition, escort carriers such as HMS Vindex and HMS Nairana played an important role in hunter-killer anti-submarine sweeps in company with RN and RCN destroyers, frigates and corvettes (e.g. 6th Canadian Escort Group and 2nd British Escort Group). HMS Vindex is credited with the sinking, or taking part in the sinking, of four U-boats (U344, U653, U765, U394).

Escort carriers should not be confused with the Merchant Aircraft Carrier or CAM ship.

== Key ==
Main guns	The number and type of the main battery guns
Displacement	Ship displacement at full combat load
Propulsion	Number of shafts, type of propulsion system, and top speed generated
Service	The dates work began and finished on the ship and its ultimate fate
Laid down	The date the keel began to be assembled
Commissioned	The date the ship was commissioned

== List ==
=== Audacity ===
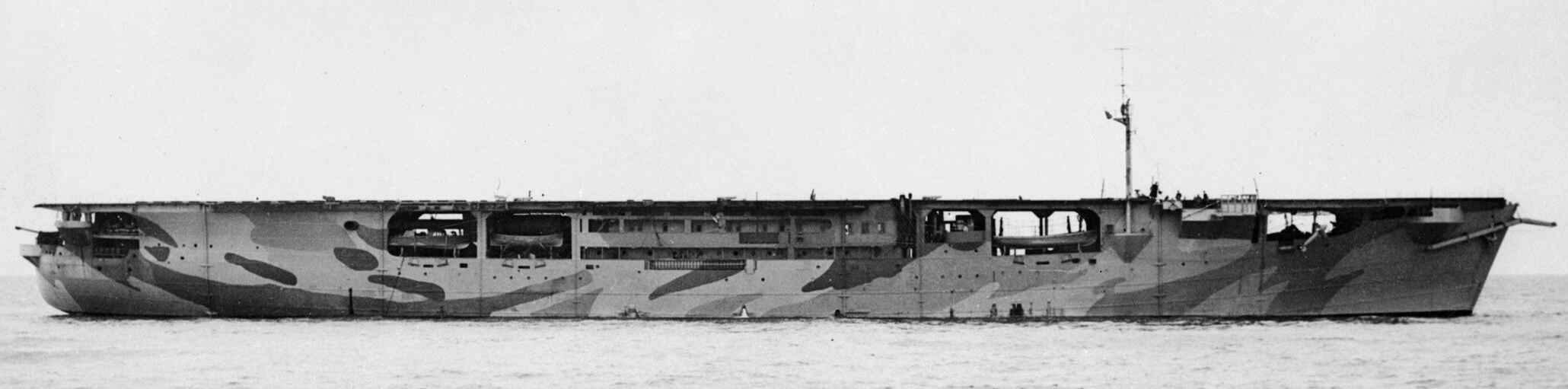
HMS Audacity

Ship	Aircraft	Displacement	Propulsion	Service		
Ship	Aircraft	Displacement	Propulsion	Converted	Commissioned	Fate
Audacity	8	11,000 long tons (11,177 t)	2 diesels, 1 shaft	1941	17 June 1941	Sunk by torpedoes from U-751 21 December 1941

=== Long Island class ===
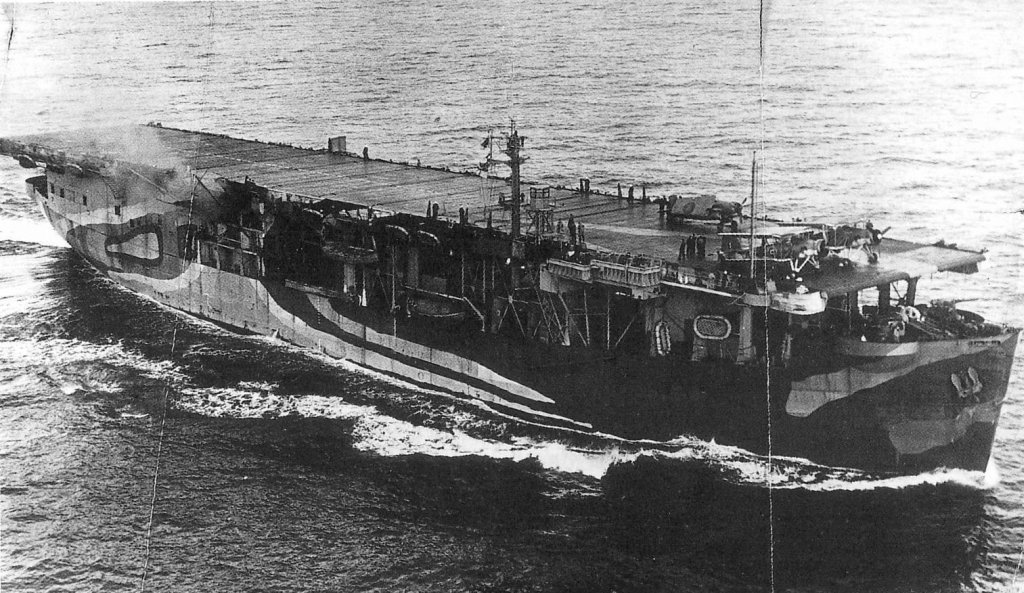
HMS Archer

Ship	Aircraft	Displacement	Propulsion	Service		
Ship	Aircraft	Displacement	Propulsion	Converted	Commissioned	Fate
Archer	16	12,860 long tons (13,066 t)	4 x diesels driving 1 shaft	1941	18 November 1941	Became Empire Lagan 1946

=== Avenger class ===
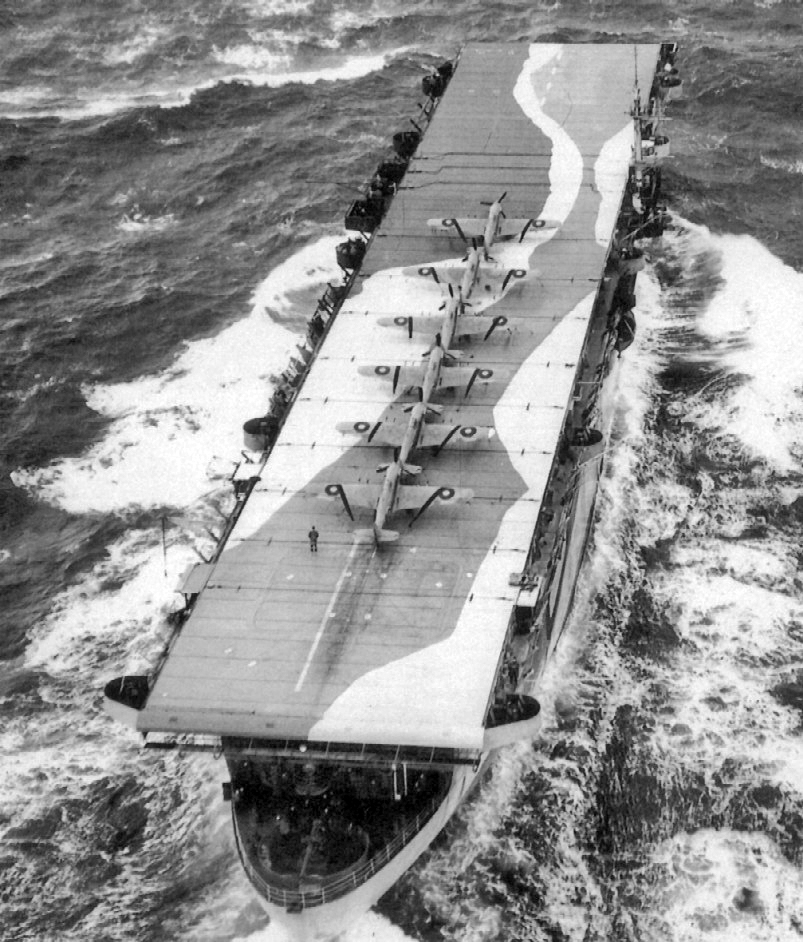
HMS Avenger

Ship	Aircraft	Displacement	Propulsion	Service		
Ship	Aircraft	Displacement	Propulsion	Converted	Commissioned	Fate
Avenger	15	14,500 long tons (14,733 t)	2 diesels, 1 shaft	27 November 1940	2 March 1942	Torpedoed and sunk west of Gibraltar by U-155 on 15 November 1942
Biter	15	14,500 long tons (14,733 t)	2 diesels, 1 shaft	8 December 1940	1 May 1942.	Sold to France and renamed Dixmude 1945
Dasher	15	14,500 long tons (14,733 t)	2 diesels, 1 shaft	12 April 1941	1 July 1942	Destroyed by an aviation fuel explosion on 27 March. 1943

=== Attacker class ===
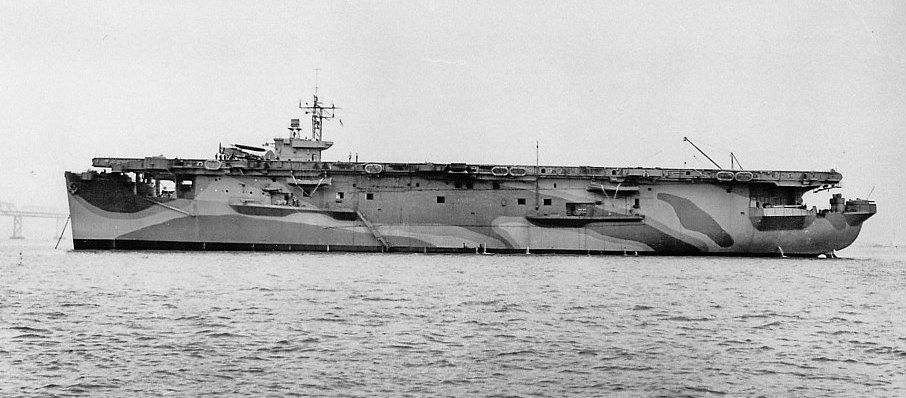
HMS Attacker 1942

Ship	Aircraft	Displacement	Propulsion	Service		
Ship	Aircraft	Displacement	Propulsion	Laid down	Commissioned	Fate
Battler	24	9,800 long tons (9,957 t)	2 Foster-Wheeler boilers 2 Westinghouse geared turbines driving 1 shaft	15 April 1941	15 November 1942	Returned to the USN on 12 February 1946
Attacker	24	9,800 long tons (9,957 t)	2 Foster-Wheeler boilers, 2 Westinghouse geared turbines driving 1 shaft	17 April 1941	10 October 1942	Returned to the USN on 5 January 1946
Hunter	24	9,800 long tons (9,957 t)	2 Foster-Wheeler boilers, 2 Westinghouse geared turbines driving 1 shaft	22 May 1942	11 January 1943	Returned to the USN on 29 December 1945
Chaser	24	9,800 long tons (9,957 t)	2 Foster-Wheeler boilers, 2 Westinghouse geared turbines driving 1 shaft	28 June 1941	9 April 1943	Returned to the USN on 12 May 1946
Fencer	24	9,800 long tons (9,957 t)	2 Foster-Wheeler boilers, 2 Westinghouse geared turbines driving 1 shaft	5 September 1941	20 February 1943	Returned to the USN on 11 December 1946
Stalker	24	9,800 long tons (9,957 t)	2 Foster-Wheeler boilers, 2 Westinghouse geared turbines driving 1 shaft	6 October 1941	30 December 1942	Returned to the USN on 29 December 1945
Pursuer	24	9,800 long tons (9,957 t)	2 Foster-Wheeler boilers, 2 Westinghouse geared turbines driving 1 shaft	31 July 1941	14 June 1943	Returned to the USN on 12 February 1946
Striker	24	9,800 long tons (9,957 t)	2 Foster-Wheeler boilers, 2 Westinghouse geared turbines driving 1 shaft	15 December 1941	29 April 1943	Returned to the USN on 12 February 1946
Searcher	24	9,800 long tons (9,957 t)	2 Foster-Wheeler boilers, 2 Westinghouse geared turbines driving 1 shaft	20 February 1942	7 April 1943	Returned to the USN on 29 November 1945
Ravager	24	9,800 long tons (9,957 t)	2 Foster-Wheeler boilers, 2 Westinghouse geared turbines driving 1 shaft	11 April 1942	26 April 1943	Returned to the USN on 26 February 1946
Tracker	24	9,800 long tons (9,957 t)	2 Foster-Wheeler boilers, 2 Westinghouse geared turbines driving 1 shaft	3 November 1941	31 January 1943	Returned to the USN on 29 November 1945

=== Ruler class ===
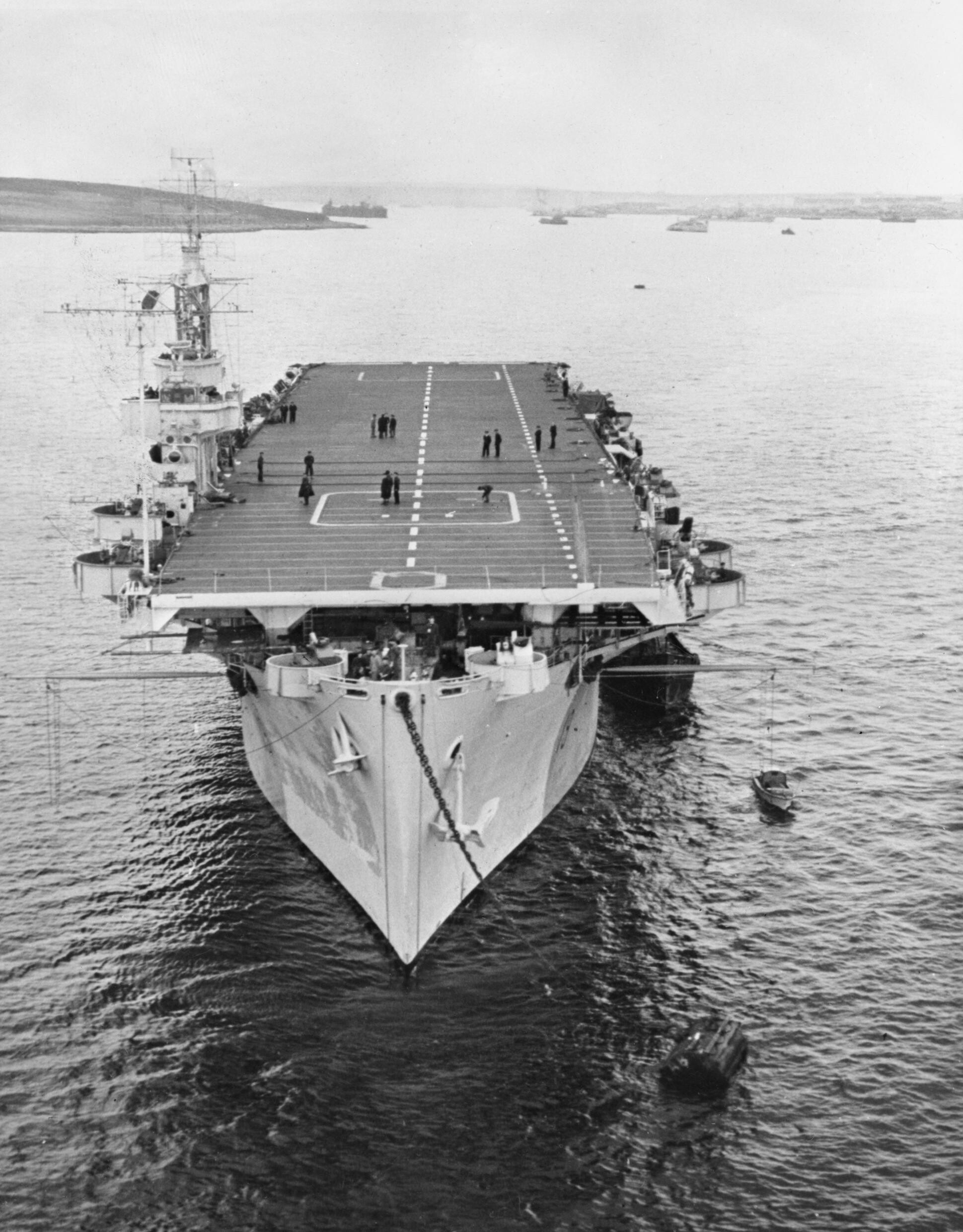
HMS Queen

Ship	Aircraft	Displacement	Propulsion	Service		
Ship	Aircraft	Displacement	Propulsion	Laid down	Commissioned	Fate
Slinger	24	14,000 long tons (14,225 t)	2 Foster-Wheeler boilers; 2 Westinghouse geared turbines, 1 shaft	25 May 1942	11 August 1943	Returned to the USN on 27 February 1946
Atheling	24	14,000 long tons (14,225 t)	2 Foster-Wheeler boilers; 2 Westinghouse geared turbines, 1 shaft	9 June 1942	31 July 1943	Returned to the USN on 13 December 1946
Emperor	24	14,000 long tons (14,225 t)	2 Foster-Wheeler boilers; 2 Westinghouse geared turbines, 1 shaft	23 June 1942	6 August 1943	Returned to the USN on 4 February 1946
Ameer	24	14,000 long tons (14,225 t)	2 Foster-Wheeler boilers; 2 Westinghouse geared turbines, 1 shaft	18 July 1942	20 July 1943	Returned to the USN on 17 January 1946
Begum	24	14,000 long tons (14,225 t)	2 Foster-Wheeler boilers; 2 Westinghouse geared turbines, 1 shaft	3 August 1942	2 August 1943	Returned to the USN on 4 January 1946
Trumpeter	24	14,000 long tons (14,225 t)	2 Foster-Wheeler boilers; 2 Westinghouse geared turbines, 1 shaft	25 August 1942	4 August 1943	Returned to the USN on 6 April 1946
Empress	24	14,000 long tons (14,225 t)	2 Foster-Wheeler boilers; 2 Westinghouse geared turbines, 1 shaft	9 September 1942	9 August 1943	Returned to the USN on 4 February 1946
Khedive	24	14,000 long tons (14,225 t)	2 Foster-Wheeler boilers; 2 Westinghouse geared turbines, 1 shaft	30 December 1942	25 August 1943	Returned to the USN on 26 January 1946
Speaker	24	14,000 long tons (14,225 t)	2 Foster-Wheeler boilers; 2 Westinghouse geared turbines, 1 shaft	9 October 1942	20 November 1943	Returned to the USN on 17 July 1946
Nabob	24	14,000 long tons (14,225 t)	2 Foster-Wheeler boilers; 2 Westinghouse geared turbines, 1 shaft	20 October 1942	7 September 1943, into the Royal Canadian Navy under Royal Navy control	Returned to USN 16 March 1945
Premier	24	14,000 long tons (14,225 t)	2 Foster-Wheeler boilers; 2 Westinghouse geared turbines, 1 shaft	31 October 1942	3 November 1943	Returned to the USN on 2 April 1946
Shah	24	14,000 long tons (14,225 t)	2 Foster-Wheeler boilers; 2 Westinghouse geared turbines, 1 shaft	13 November 1942	27 September 1943	Returned to the USN on 6 December 1945
Patroller	24	14,000 long tons (14,225 t)	2 Foster-Wheeler boilers; 2 Westinghouse geared turbines, 1 shaft	27 November 1942	25 October 1943	Returned to the USN on 13 December 1946
Rajah	24	14,000 long tons (14,225 t)	2 Foster-Wheeler boilers; 2 Westinghouse geared turbines, 1 shaft	17 December 1942	17 January 1944	Returned to the USN on 13 December 1946
Ranee	24	14,000 long tons (14,225 t)	2 Foster-Wheeler boilers; 2 Westinghouse geared turbines, 1 shaft	5 January 1943	8 November 1943	Returned to the USN on 21 November 1946
Trouncer	24	14,000 long tons (14,225 t)	2 Foster-Wheeler boilers; 2 Westinghouse geared turbines, 1 shaft	1 January 1943	31 January 1944	Returned to the USN 3 March 1946
Thane	24	14,000 long tons (14,225 t)	2 Foster-Wheeler boilers; 2 Westinghouse geared turbines, 1 shaft	22 February 1943	19 November 1943	Returned to the USN on 5 December 1945
Queen	24	14,000 long tons (14,225 t)	2 Foster-Wheeler boilers; 2 Westinghouse geared turbines, 1 shaft	12 March 1943	7 December 1943	Returned to the USN on 31 October 1946
Ruler	24	14,000 long tons (14,225 t)	2 Foster-Wheeler boilers; 2 Westinghouse geared turbines, 1 shaft	21 March 1943	22 December 1943	Returned to the USN on 29 January 1946
Arbiter	24	14,000 long tons (14,225 t)	2 Foster-Wheeler boilers; 2 Westinghouse geared turbines, 1 shaft	26 April 1943	31 December 1943	Returned to the USN on 3 March 1946
Smiter	24	14,000 long tons (14,225 t)	2 Foster-Wheeler boilers; 2 Westinghouse geared turbines, 1 shaft	10 May 1943	20 January 1944	Returned to the USN on 6 April 1946
Puncher	24	14,000 long tons (14,225 t)	2 Foster-Wheeler boilers; 2 Westinghouse geared turbines, 1 shaft	21 May 1943	5 February 1944, into the Royal Canadian Navy under Royal Navy control	Returned to the USN on 16 January 1946
Reaper	24	14,000 long tons (14,225 t)	2 Foster-Wheeler boilers; 2 Westinghouse geared turbines, 1 shaft	5 June 1943	21 February 1944	Returned to the USN on 20 May 1946

=== Activity ===
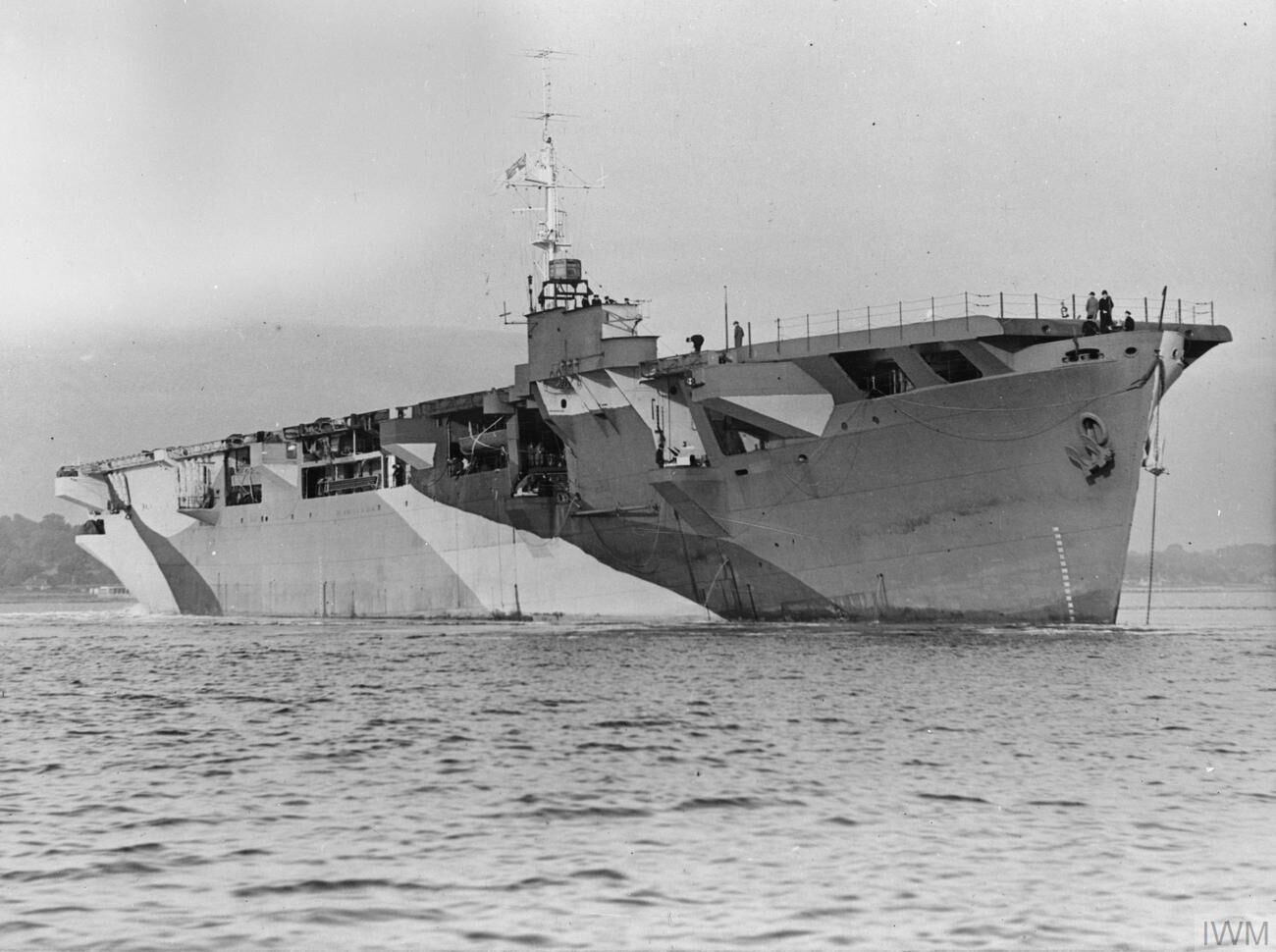
HMS Activity

Ship	Aircraft	Displacement	Propulsion	Service		
Ship	Aircraft	Displacement	Propulsion	Laid down	Commissioned	Fate
Activity	10	14,250 long tons (14,479 t)	2 × diesel engines	1 February 1940	1944	Sold in March 1946

=== Nairana class ===
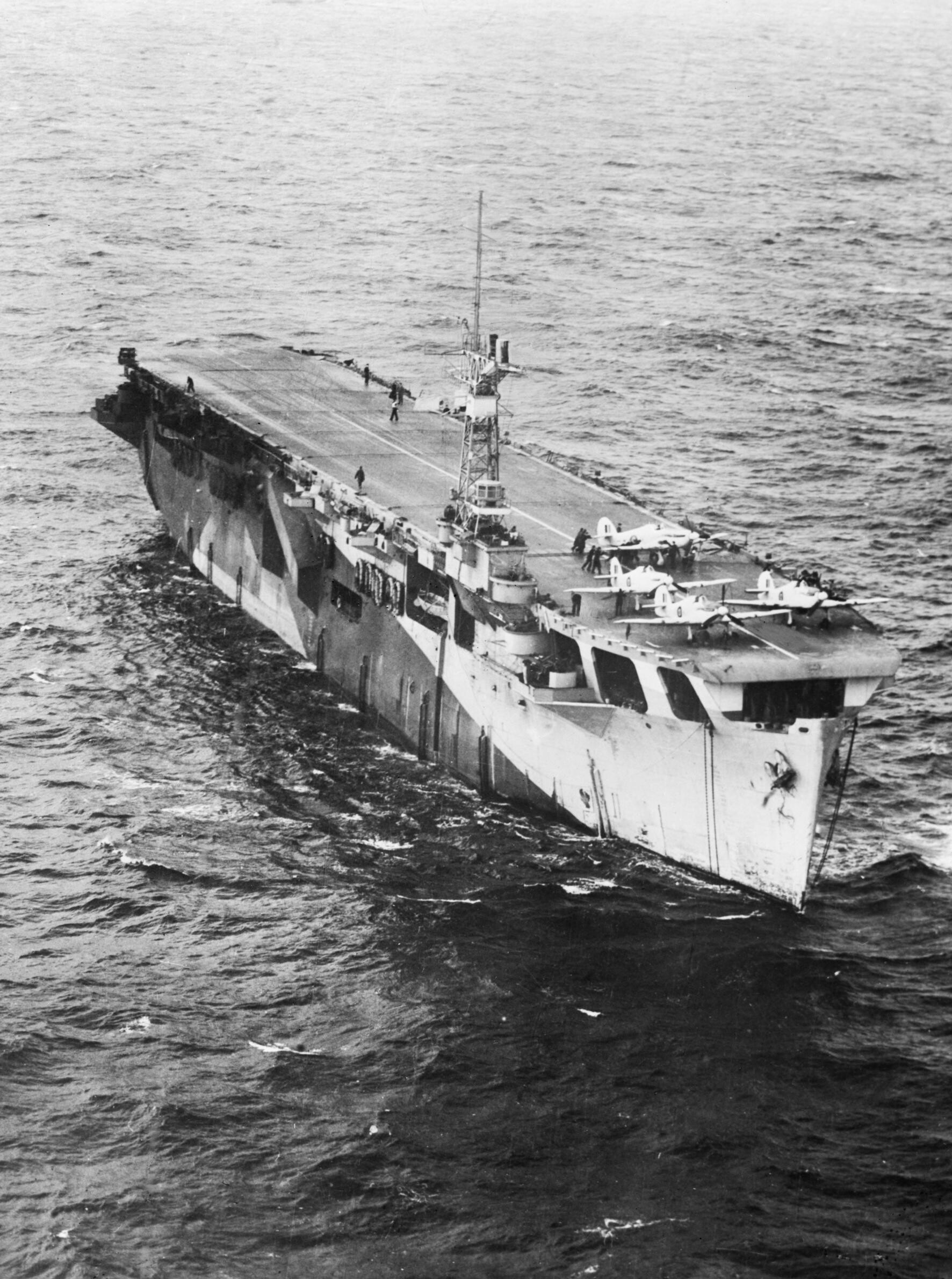
HMS Nairana

Ship	Aircraft	Displacement	Propulsion	Service		
Ship	Aircraft	Displacement	Propulsion	Laid down	Commissioned	Fate
Nairana	15–20	14,050 long tons (14,275 t)	2 sets 5-cylinder Doxford Diesels. 2 shafts	20 May 1943	12 December 1943	Transferred to Netherlands 20 March 1946
Vindex	15–20	16,830 long tons (17,100 t)		1 July 1942	3 December 1943	Sold 1947 and became MS Port Vindex
Campania	15–20	16,830 long tons (17,100 t)		1 July 1942	3 December 1943	Sold 1947 and became MS Port Victor

=== Pretoria Castle ===
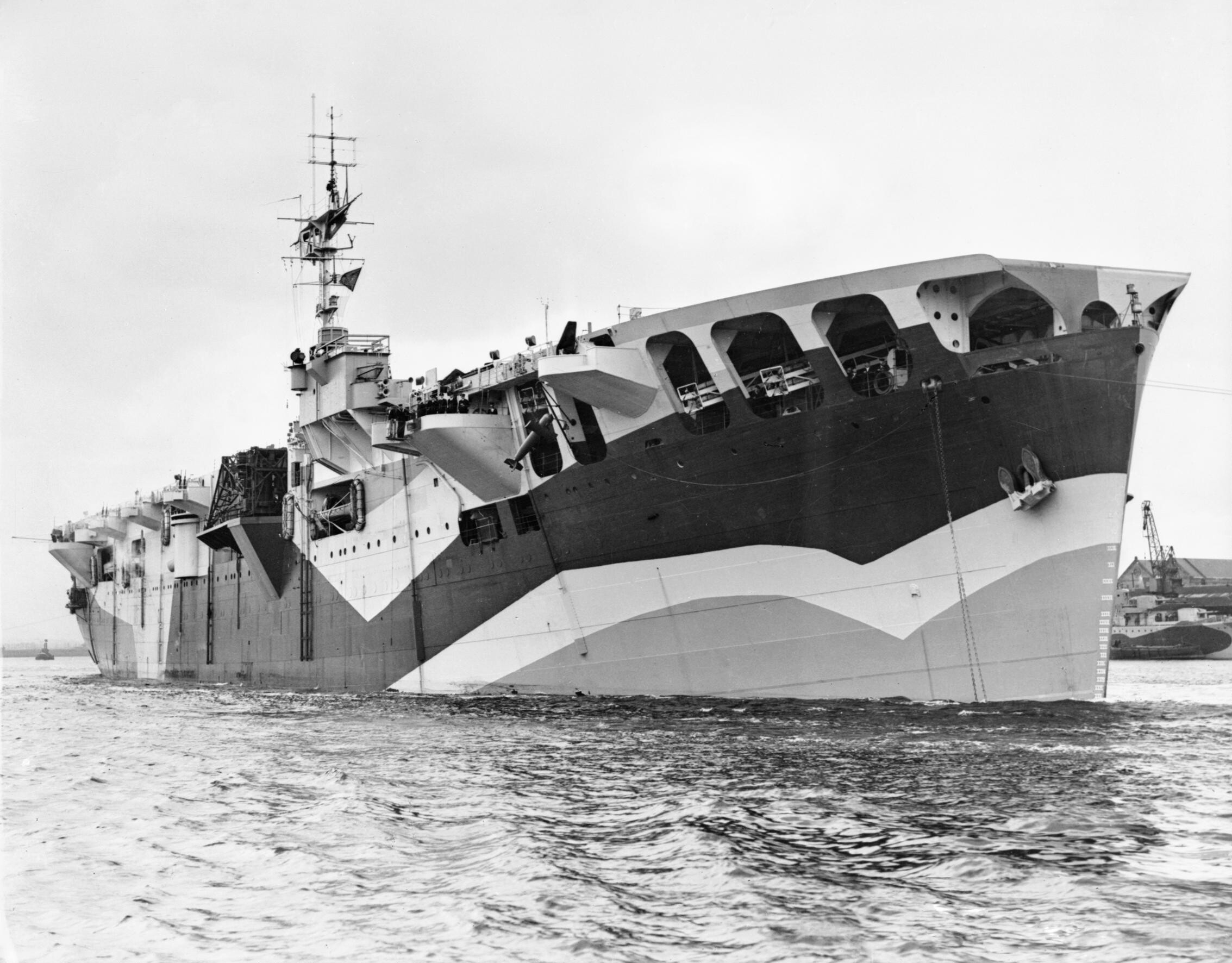
HMS Pretoria Castle

Ship	Aircraft	Displacement	Propulsion	Service		
Ship	Aircraft	Displacement	Propulsion	Laid down	Commissioned	Fate
Pretoria Castle	15	23,450 long tons (23,826 t)	2-shaft diesel engine: 16,000 bhp	12 October 1938	9 April 1943	Sold 26 January 1946
