= Bogue-class escort carrier =

Aircraft carrier class of the US Navy

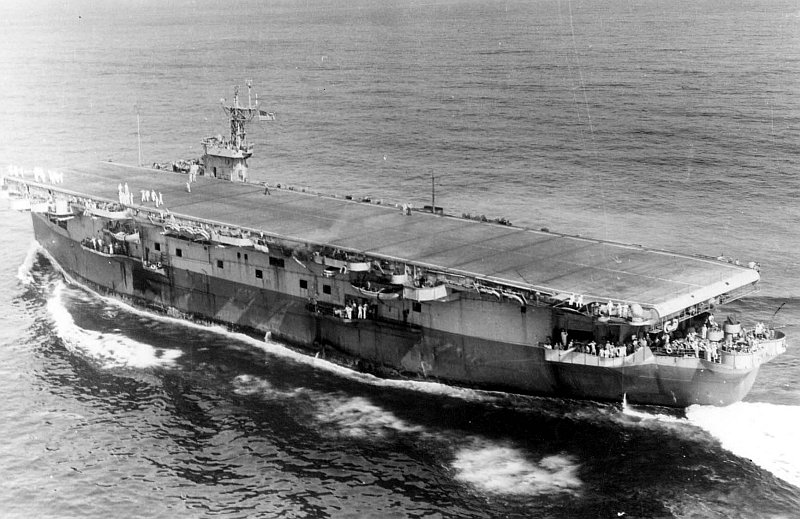
- USS Bogue (CVE-9)

Class overview
- Name: Bogue class
- Builders: Seattle-Tacoma Shipbuilding; Ingalls Shipbuilding; Western Pipe & Steel
- Operators: Royal Navy; United States Navy
- Preceded by: Long Island class
- Succeeded by: Sangamon class
- Subclasses: Attacker class; Ruler class (Ameer class); Prince William class
- In commission: 1942–1947
- Completed: 45
- Lost: 3

General characteristics
- Type: Escort carrier
- Displacement: 8,390 long tons (8,520 t) (standard); 13,980 long tons (14,200 t) (full load)
- Length: 465 ft (142 m) (wl); 495 ft 8 in (151.08 m) (oa); 440 ft (130 m) (fd)
- Beam: 69 ft 6 in (21.18 m) wl; 82 ft (25 m) (fd); 111 ft 6 in (33.99 m) (extreme width)
- Draft: 23 ft 3 in (7.09 m) (mean); 26 ft (7.9 m) (max)
- Installed power: 2 × Foster-Wheeler 285 psi (1,970 kPa) boilers; 8,500 shp (6,300 kW)
- Propulsion: 1 × Allis-Chalmers steam turbine; 1 × Screw
- Speed: 18 kn (33 km/h; 21 mph)
- Range: 26,300 nmi (48,700 km; 30,300 mi) at 15 kn (28 km/h; 17 mph)
- Capacity: 2,400 long tons (2,439 t) (fuel oil); 100,000 US gal (380,000 L; 83,000 imp gal) (Avgas)
- Complement: 890
- Armament: As designed: 2 × 5 in (127 mm)/51 caliber; 10 × 20 mm (0.79 in) Oerlikon anti-aircraft cannons; Varied, ultimate armament: 2 × 5 in (127 mm)/38 cal dual-purpose gun (DP); 8 × twin 40 mm (1.57 in) Bofors anti-aircraft guns; 20 × 20 mm Oerlikon anti-aircraft cannons
- Aircraft carried: 19-24
- Aviation facilities: 1 × hydraulic catapult; 2 × elevators

The Bogue class was a class of 45 escort carriers built in the United States during World War II. Of this total 34 were transferred, through the Lend-Lease program, to Britain's Royal Navy for wartime service. Several subclasses were recognized within the group, one of which, consisting of the 11 ships retained in American service, was also, by itself, identified as the Bogue class.

The first 22 ships of the class were converted from finished or near-finished Maritime Commission Type C3-S-A1 and C3-S-A2 hulls, with 11 being retained by the USN as the Bogue class, and the other 11 transferring to the Royal Navy, where they were given new names and classified as the Attacker class. The remaining 23 ships were built from the keel up on hulls based on the C3-class, but incorporating greater internal subdivision and retaining their as-built American-made main armament, and were classified as Ruler class, or the Ameer class. Prince William, the last of the USN ships to be built, was the only unit in American service considered equivalent to the Ruler-class, rather than the Attackers; as such it is sometimes referred to as its own subclass.

Following the war, those ships that served with the Royal Navy were returned to the United States and were either scrapped or converted for mercantile use. Of the 11 vessels that had served in the U. S. Navy during the war, ten were kept in service for helicopter and aircraft transport operations.

== Construction and design ==
The Bogue-class escort carriers were based on the Maritime Commission's Type C3 cargo ship hull. They were originally to be named for sounds. All of the ships for the USN and half of the ships for the Royal Navy were built by the Seattle-Tacoma Shipbuilding Corporation, while the remainder (all early Royal Navy ships) were produced by Ingalls Shipbuilding of Pascagoula, Mississippi, and Western Pipe and Steel Company of San Francisco, California.

=== Specifications ===
The ships retained by the U.S. Navy displaced 8,390 long tons (8,520 t) at standard load and 13,980 long tons (14,200 t) at full load. These ships had a waterline length of 465 ft (142 m), with an overall length of 495 ft 8 in (151.08 m)(Ruler-class ships were about 4 ft [1.2 m] shorter, and displaced c. 1,400 tons more [deep load]). Their beam was 69 ft 6 in (21.18 m) at the waterline, with a maximum beam of 111 ft 6 in (33.99 m). Their draft was 24 ft 8 in (7.52 m) at full load and 21 ft (6.4 m) at light load.

=== Propulsion and power ===
The previous Long Island and Charger-class escort carriers had suffered from reliability and performance issues with their diesel engines, so it was decided that the Bogues would use two water-tube boilers, built by Foster-Wheeler, feeding steam to one or two (sources vary) steam-turbine engine(s)connected to a single shaft. This produced 8,500 bhp (6,300 kW), which could propel the ships at 18 kn (33 km/h; 21 mph). They could sail 26,300 nmi (48,700 km; 30,300 mi) at 15 kn (28 km/h; 17 mph).

=== Aircraft facilities ===
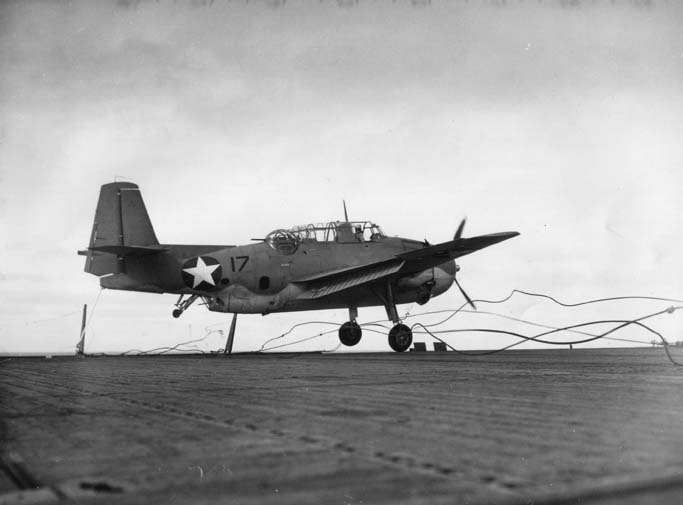
Landing of a USN Grumman TBF-1 Avenger on the escort carrier Card on 9 December 1942.

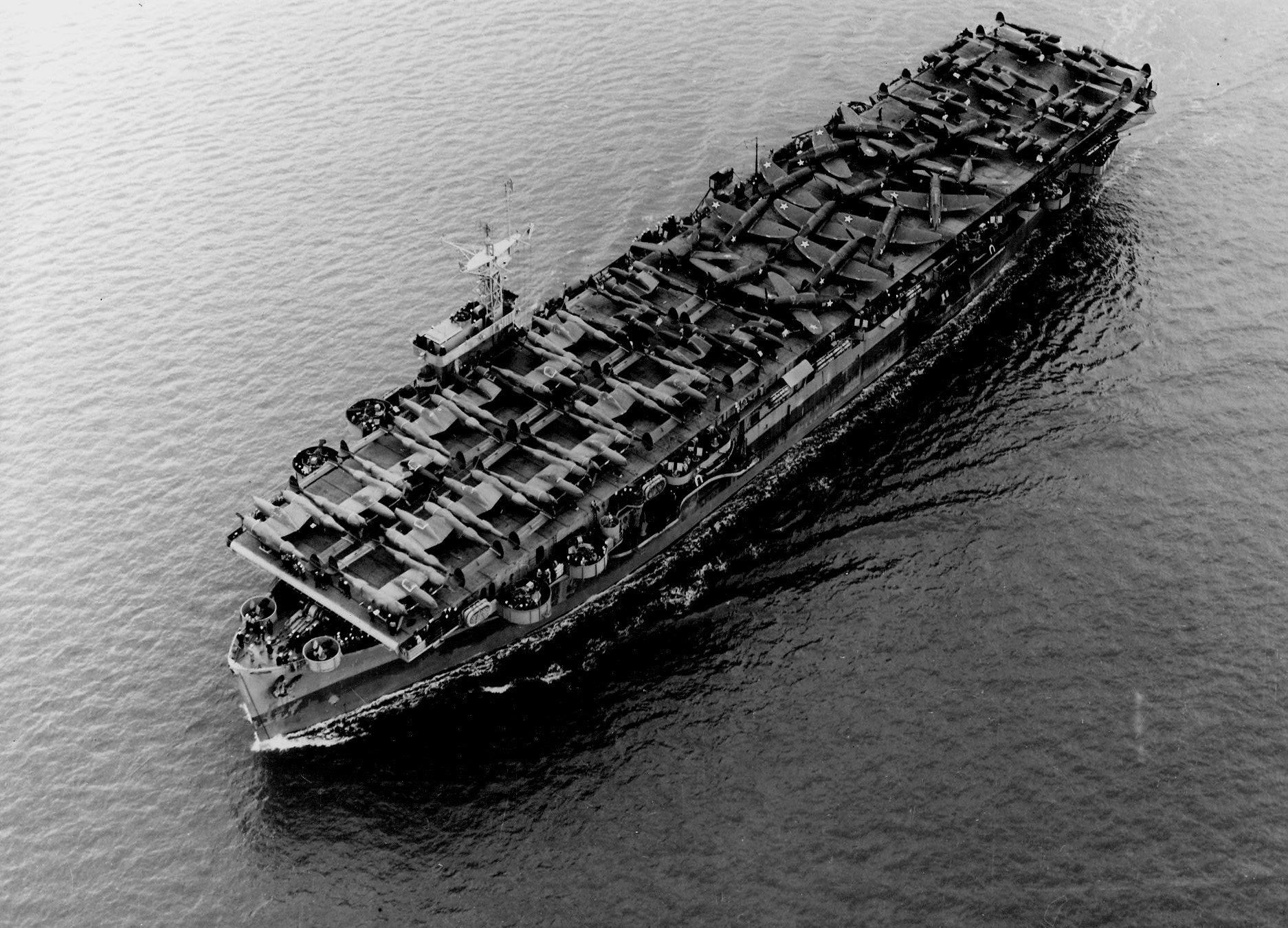
The US Navy escort carrier Barnes underway in the Pacific Ocean, on 1 July 1943, transporting US Army Air Forces Lockheed P-38 Lightning and Republic P-47 Thunderbolt aircraft.

The Bogue class had the capacity for up to 24 antisubmarine or fighter aircraft, which could be a mixture of Grumman/General Motors Wildcat, Vought Corsair, and Grumman/General Motors Avenger planes. The exact composition of the embarked squadrons depended upon the mission. Some squadrons were composite squadrons for convoy defense, and would be equipped with antisubmarine and fighter aircraft, while other squadrons working in a strike-carrier role would only be equipped with fighter aircraft. When used in ferry service, the ships could carry up to 90 aircraft between both the flight and hangar decks.

Aircraft facilities consisted of a small, combined bridge–flight control island on the forward starboard side of the ship. The flight deck measured 440 ft × 82 ft (134 m × 25 m), and incorporated nine arresting wires and three barriers at the stern, along with one hydraulic catapult capable of launching aircraft weighing up to 3.5 short tons (3.2 t) at 61 kn (113 km/h; 70 mph) on the port side at the bow. The hangar deck measured 262 ft × 62 ft × 18 ft (79.9 m × 18.9 m × 5.5 m), larger than on the previous Long Island class, and was fully enclosed. Elevators with a capacity of 6.5 short tons (5.9 t) were located at the fore and aft ends of the hangar. The hangar deck retained the sheer of the main deck of the merchant ships on which they were built; this meant that, to move an airplane from the central part of the hangar to either of the elevators involved rolling it uphill. To help with this winches and cables had to be used; nonetheless, even with these aids moving planes about on the hangar deck remained difficult in normal conditions and nearly impossible in rough seas. The ships were also equipped with derricks for retrieving seaplanes and loading and unloading aircraft.

=== Armament ===
The Bogue class ships were equipped with a variety of weapons, which changed throughout the war and varied from subclass to subclass. The early ships were equipped with two 5-inch (127 mm)/51 caliber guns, suitable only for use against surface targets, on sponsons at either side of the stern; on Attacker-class vessels these were replaced with 4-inch guns of indeterminate type (compatible with British-made anmunition) before the ships entered service, while on Ruler - and American Bogue-class ships they were replaced, or equipped from the start, with two 5-inch (127 mm)/38 caliber, dual-purpose guns. For antiaircraft (AA) cover, early ships were initially equipped with ten 20-millimeter (0.79 in) Oerlikon cannons, which were later augmented with up to eight twin-mounted 40-millimeter (1.57 in) Bofors AA guns and an additional 10 to 18 Oerlikons in single or twin mounts.

After the war, the 10 remaining Bogue-class escort carriers retained in US service were redesignated as "helicopter escort carriers" (CVHE) in 1955, and five of these were redesignated as "utility escort carriers" (CVU) in 1958, then aircraft ferry (AKV) in 1958, and operating under US Military Sea Transportation Service during the Vietnam War.

== Transfer to the Royal Navy ==
Thirty-four of the 45 ships of the Bogue class were transferred to the Royal Navy under the provisions of the Lend-Lease program; they were given new names for their RN service and returned to the USN after the war. Of the first group of 22 ships, 11 were transferred to the RN and reclassified as Attacker class. These ships had been converted from Maritime Commission Type C3 cargo ships that were finished or had already been laid down. A second group of 23 ships was built from the keel up, based on C3-S-A1 or C3-S-A1 plans, and transferred to the RN and reclassified as Ruler class, or Ameer class, in British service, and sometimes as the Prince William class by the USN.

As delivered, these carriers required modifications to conform to RN standards. The Attacker-class ships had their conversions carried out in drydocks in United Kingdom, but, because British ports were overburdened with other work, 19 of the 23 ships of the Ameer class were modified by Burrard Dry Dock at Vancouver, British Columbia, Canada. Changes included extending the flight deck, fitting redesigned flying controls and fighter direction layout, modifications to the hangar, accommodation and storerooms, extra safety measures, oiling at sea arrangements, gunnery and other internal communications, extra wireless and radio facilities, ship blackout arrangements, and other changes necessary for British service.

The consequential delays in getting these ships into active service caused critical comments from some in the USN.

== Ships of class ==
Converted from C-3 cargo ships

=== First group ===
List of Bogue-class/Attacker-class escort carriers
Hull number	US name	Pennant number	British name	Builder	Laid down	Launched	Commissioned	Decommissioned	Fate
CVE-6	Altamaha (ex-Mormacmail)	D18	Battler	Ingalls Shipbuilding	15 April 1941	4 April 1942	15 November 1942	12 February 1946	Returned to US, sold for scrap 14 May 1946
CVE-7	Barnes (ex-Steel Artisan)	D02	Attacker	Western Pipe and Steel Company	17 April 1941	27 September 1941	30 September 1942	5 January 1946	Returned to US, sold for mercantile use February 1947
CVE-8	Block Island (ex-Mormacpenn)	D80	Hunter (ex-Trailer)	Ingalls Shipbuilding	15 May 1941	22 May 1942	9 January 1943	29 December 1945	Returned to US, sold for mercantile use 17 January 1947
CVE-9	Bogue (ex-Steel Advocate)	—N/a	—N/a	Seattle-Tacoma Shipbuilding Corporation	1 October 1941	15 January 1942	26 September 1942	30 November 1946	Sold for scrapping 1960
CVE-10	Breton	D32	Chaser	Ingalls Shipbuilding	28 June 1941	19 June 1942	9 April 1943	12 May 1946	Returned to US, sold for mercantile use
CVE-11	Card	—N/a	—N/a	Seattle-Tacoma Shipbuilding Corporation	27 October 1941	27 February 1942	8 November 1942	13 May 1946	Converted to an aircraft transport as USNS Card, sold for scrapping in 1971
CVE-12	Copahee	—N/a	—N/a	Seattle-Tacoma Shipbuilding Corporation	18 June 1941	21 October 1941	15 June 1942	5 July 1946	Sold for scrapping 1961
CVE-13	Core	—N/a	—N/a	Seattle-Tacoma Shipbuilding Corporation	2 January 1942	15 May 1942	10 December 1942	4 October 1946	Sold for scrapping 1971
CVE-14	Croatan	D64	Fencer	Western Pipe and Steel Company	5 September 1941	4 April 1942	20 February 1943	21 December 1945	Returned to US, sold for mercantile use
CVE-15	Hamlin	D91	Stalker	Western Pipe and Steel Company	6 October 1941	5 March 1942	21 December 1942	29 December 1945	Returned to US, sold for mercantile use
CVE-16	Nassau	—N/a	—N/a	Seattle-Tacoma Shipbuilding Corporation	27 November 1941	4 April 1942	20 August 1942	28 October 1946	Sold for scrap 1961
CVE-17	St. George	D73	Pursuer	Ingalls Shipbuilding	31 July 1941	18 July 1942	14 June 1943	12 February 1946	Returned to US, sold for scrapping 1946
CVE-18	Altamaha	—N/a	—N/a	Seattle-Tacoma Shipbuilding Corporation	19 December 1941	22 May 1942	15 September 1942	27 September 1946	Sold for scrapping 1961
CVE-19	Prince William	D12	Striker	Western Pipe and Steel Company	15 December 1941	7 May 1942	18 May 1943	12 February 1946	Returned to US, sold for scrapping 1948
CVE-20	Barnes	—N/a	—N/a	Seattle-Tacoma Shipbuilding Corporation	19 January 1942	2 May 1942	20 February 1943	29 August 1946	Sold for scrapping 1960
CVE-21	Block Island	—N/a	—N/a	Seattle-Tacoma Shipbuilding Corporation	19 January 1942	1 May 1942	8 March 1943	—N/a	Torpedoed by German submarine U-549, scuttled 29 May 1944
AVG-22	—N/a	D40	Searcher	Seattle-Tacoma Shipbuilding Corporation	20 February 1942	20 June 1942	7 April 1943	29 November 1945	Returned to US, sold for mercantile use
CVE-23	Breton	—N/a	—N/a	Seattle-Tacoma Shipbuilding Corporation	25 February 1942	27 June 1942	12 April 1943	20 August 1946	Sold for scrapping 1972
AVG-24	—N/a	D70	Ravager	Seattle-Tacoma Shipbuilding Corporation	11 April 1942	16 July 1942	25 April 1943	27 February 1946	Returned to US, sold for mercantile use
CVE-25	Croatan	—N/a	—N/a	Seattle-Tacoma Shipbuilding Corporation	15 April 1942	1 August 1942	28 April 1943	20 May 1946	Sold for scrapping 1971
BAVG-6	—N/a	D24	Tracker	Seattle-Tacoma Shipbuilding Corporation	3 November 1941	7 March 1942	31 January 1943	2 November 1946	Returned to US, sold for mercantile use
CVE-31	Prince William	—N/a	—N/a	Seattle-Tacoma Shipbuilding Corporation	18 May 1942	23 August 1942	9 April 1943	29 August 1946	Sold for scrapping, 1961

=== Second group ===
Built from the keel up as escort carriers. All were built by the Seattle-Tacoma Shipbuilding Corporation. General characteristics as the Attacker class, except for displacement and armament.

List of Bogue-class/Ameer ("Ruler") -class escort carriers
Hull number	US name	Pennant number	British name	Laid down	Launched	Commissioned	Decommissioned	Fate
CVE-32	Chatham	D26	Slinger	25 May 1942	19 September 1942	11 August 1943	12 April 1946	Returned to US, sold for mercantile use
CVE-33	Glacier	D51	Atheling	9 June 1942	7 September 1942	28 October 1943	6 December 1946	Returned to US, sold for mercantile use
CVE-34	Pybus	D98	Emperor	23 June 1942	7 October 1942	6 August 1943	28 March 1946	Returned to US, sold for scrapping 1946
CVE-35	Baffins	D01	Ameer	18 July 1942	18 October 1942	20 July 1943	20 March 1946	Returned to US, sold for mercantile use
CVE-36	Bolinas	D38	Begum	3 August 1942	11 November 1942	2 August 1943	26 February 1946	Returned to US, sold for mercantile use
CVE-37	Bastian	D09	Trumpeter	25 August 1942	15 December 1942	4 August 1943	19 June 1946	Returned to US, sold for mercantile use
CVE-38	Carnegie	D42	Empress	9 September 1942	30 December 1942	12 August 1943	28 March 1946	Returned to US, sold for scrapping 1946
CVE-39	Cordova	D62	Khedive	22 September 1942	30 January 1943	25 August 1943	19 July 1946	Returned to US, sold for mercantile use
CVE-40	Delgada	D90	Speaker	9 October 1942	20 February 1943	20 November 1943	25 September 1946	Returned to US, sold for mercantile use
CVE-41	Edisto	D77	Nabob	20 October 1942	22 March 1943	7 September 1943	10 October 1944	Torpedoed by German submarine U-354, judged not worth repair. Later salvaged and sold for mercantile use.
CVE-42	Estero	D23	Premier	31 October 1942	22 March 1943	3 November 1943	21 May 1946	Returned to US, sold for mercantile use
CVE-43	Jamaica	D21	Shah	13 November 1942	21 April 1943	27 September 1943	7 February 1946	Returned to US, sold for mercantile use
CVE-44	Keweenaw	D07	Patroller	27 November 1942	6 May 1943	25 October 1943	7 February 1947	Returned to US, sold for mercantile use
CVE-45	Prince	D10	Rajah	17 December 1942	18 May 1943	17 January 1944	7 February 1947	Returned to US, sold for mercantile use
CVE-46	Niantic	D03	Ranee	5 January 1943	2 June 1943	8 November 1943	22 January 1947	Returned to US, sold for mercantile use
CVE-47	Perdido	D85	Trouncer	1 February 1943	16 June 1943	31 January 1944	12 April 1946	Returned to US, sold for mercantile use
CVE-48	Sunset	D48	Thane	23 February 1943	15 July 1943	19 November 1943	1945	Torpedoed by German submarine U-1172, declared a total loss and sold for scrap.
CVE-49	St. Andrews	D19	Queen	12 March 1943	2 August 1943	7 December 1943	1946	Returned to US, sold for mercantile use
CVE-50	St. Joseph	D72	Ruler	25 March 1943	21 August 1943	22 December 1943	29 January 1946	Returned to US, sold for scrapping 1946
CVE-51	St. Simon	D31	Arbiter	26 April 1943	9 September 1943	31 December 1943	12 April 1946	Returned to US, sold for mercantile use
CVE-52	Vermillion	D55	Smiter	10 May 1943	27 September 1943	20 January 1944	6 May 1946	Returned to US, sold for mercantile use
CVE-53	Willapa	D79	Puncher	21 May 1943	8 November 1943	5 February 1944	16 February 1946	Returned to US, sold for mercantile use
CVE-54	Winjah	D82	Reaper	5 June 1943	22 November 1943	18 February 1944	2 July 1946	Used for captured aircraft transport after May 1945, then returned to US, sold for mercantile use.

== See also ==
- List of aircraft carriers
- List of aircraft carriers of World War II
- List of ship classes of World War II

== Bibliography ==
- Petrescu, Relly; Petrescu, Florian (February 2013). The Aviation History. Norderstedt: Books on Demand GmbH. ISBN 9783848266395.
- Chesneau, Roger (1998). Aircraft Carriers of the World: 1914 to the Present. London, England: Brockhampton Press. ISBN 1860198759.
- Fontenoy, Paul (2006). Aircraft Carriers: An Illustrated History of Their Impact. Santa Barbara, California: ABC-Clio, Inc. ISBN 9781851095735.
- Jane, Frederick Thomas; Prendergast, Maurice; Parkes, Oscar (1961). Jane's Fighting Ships. Santa Barbara, California: Jane's Publishing Company Limited.
- Wragg, David (2005). The Escort Carrier in the Second World War: Combustible, Vulnerable, Expendable!. Barnsley, South Yorkshire, England: Pen & Sword Books. ISBN 9781783409327.
- Gardiner, Robert (1984). Conway's All the World's Fighting Ships 1922-1946. Naval Institute Press. ISBN 9780870219139.
- Konstam, Angus (2019). British Escort Carriers 1941–1945. Oxford, United Kingdom: Osprey Publishing Ltd. ISBN 978-1-4728-3625-0.
- Poolman, Kenneth (1972). Escort Carrier 1941–1945. London: Ian Allan. ISBN 0-7110-0273-8.
- Morison, Samuel (2002). History of United States Naval Operations in World War II. Urbana, Illinois: University of Illinois Press. ISBN 978-0-252-07062-4.
