= Ruler-class escort carrier =

1943 class of escort aircraft carriers of the Royal Navy

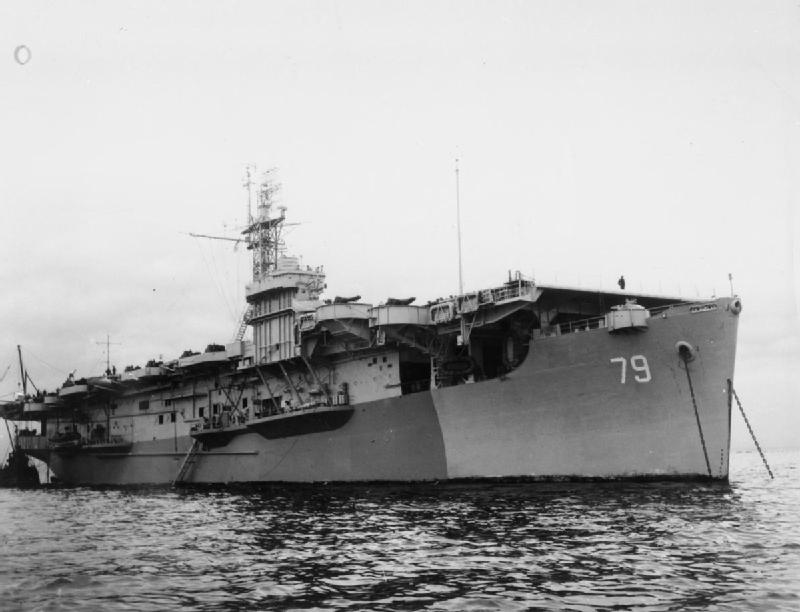
- HMS Puncher

Class overview
- Name: Ruler class
- Builders: Seattle-Tacoma Shipbuilding Corporation
- Operators: Royal Navy
- Preceded by: Attacker class
- Succeeded by: None
- Built: 1942–1943
- Planned: 23
- Completed: 23
- Lost: 2

General characteristics
- Type: Escort carrier
- Displacement: 11,420 long tons (11,600 t)
- Length: 492 ft 3 in (150.0 m)
- Beam: 69 ft 6 in (21.2 m)
- Draught: 25 ft 6 in (7.77 m)
- Installed power: 9,350 shp (6,970 kW)
- Propulsion: 1 shaft geared steam turbines
- Speed: 17 knots (31 km/h; 20 mph)
- Complement: 646
- Armament: 2 × 5", 38 caliber DP guns in single mounts; 16 × Bofors 40 mm anti-aircraft gun in twin mounts; 20 × Oerlikon 20 mm anti-aircraft cannons in single mounts
- Aircraft carried: 24
- Aviation facilities: Hangar 260 ft × 62 ft (79 m × 19 m); Two 42 ft × 34 ft (13 m × 10 m) lifts; Nine arrestor wires
- Notes: Built in two groups of 8 and 15

The Ruler class was a group of 23 American-built escort aircraft carriers which were supplied under Lend-Lease to Britain's Royal Navy during the Second World War. A subset of the 45-strong Bogue-class, all 23 hulls were built by the Seattle-Tacoma Shipbuilding Corporation; most were completed by the same firm, though at least eight were towed, unfinished, to Portland, Oregon for completion as aircraft carriers by Willamette Iron and Steel (Premier, Queen, Rajah, Slinger Speaker) or Commercial Iron Works (Ameer, Trouncer, Trumpeter). The Rulers were the most numerous single class of aircraft carriers to serve with the Royal Navy.

After the Second World War some of these ships were scrapped almost immediately, while others had their flight decks removed and were converted into merchant ships. All had been scrapped by the 1970s.

== Design and description ==
The hulls that became the Ruler class were earmarked for completion as escort carriers before they were laid down, and incorporated several changes (most notably, greater internal subdivision) that differentiated them from earlier Bogues that had been laid down as merchant ships and later converted. The ships had an overall length of 492 feet 3 inches (150.0 m)(slightly shorter than the earlier Attacker class), a beam of 69 feet 6 inches (21.2 m) and a draught of 25 ft 6 in (7.8 m). Motive power was supplied by two boilers, each powering an Allis-Chalmers steam turbine, which together delivered 9,350 shaft horsepower (6,970 kW) to one shaft, which could propel the ship at 16.5 knots (30.6 km/h; 19.0 mph). The ships had complements of 646 officers and men.

Aircraft facilities included a 438 by 80 foot (134 by 24 m) flight deck overlying a 260-by-62-foot (79.2 by 18.9 m) hangar, with 43-by-34-foot (13.1 by 10.4 m) aircraft lifts at its fore and aft ends; one aircraft catapult, forward on the port side; and nine arrestor wires. A small (ca. 25- by 6-foot/7.6 by 1.8 m) combined bridge–flight control island was located far forward on the starboard side, outside the footprint of the hull and flight deck and braced from beneath by external struts. Armament comprised two American-built 5-inch, 38-caliber dual purpose guns in single mounts (differentiating these ships from the earlier Attacker class ships, whose original 5-inch guns had been swapped out for 4-inch guns once the ships reached Britain), sixteen 40 mm (1.6 in) Bofors anti-aircraft guns in twin mounts, and twenty 20 mm (0.79 in) Oerlikon anti-aircraft cannon in single mounts.

As built they were intended for three types of operations, "Assault" or strike, convoy escort, or aircraft ferry. They had a maximum capacity of twenty-four aircraft, generally a mix of American-built Grumman/General Motors Martlet or Vought Corsair, or British-built Hawker Sea Hurricane fighters, and Fairey Swordfish (British) or Grumman Avenger (American) torpedo bombers (acting as anti-submarine aircraft), with the mix varying by date and assignment.

== Ships ==
Some British sources include the carriers Ravager, Searcher, and Tracker, all listed elsewhere on Wikipedia as part of the earlier Attacker class, as part of the Ruler class instead, while other sources state that six Rulers--Patroller, Puncher, Reaper, Slinger, Smiter, and Trouncer--together constitute a separate class, the Smiter class. Since no overwhelmingly convincing arguments supporting these interpretations seem to exist, the class designations reflected in the list below will be adhered to here.

=== First group ===
- HMS Patroller
- HMS Puncher (crewed by the Royal Canadian Navy)
- HMS Reaper
- HMS Slinger
- HMS Smiter ^{X}
- HMS Speaker ^{XX}
- HMS Trouncer
- HMS Trumpeter ^{X}

=== Second group ===
- HMS Arbiter
- HMS Ameer ^{XX}
- HMS Atheling ^{X}
- HMS Begum ^{X}
- HMS Emperor ^{XX}
- HMS Empress
- HMS Khedive ^{X}
- HMS Nabob ^{X} (crewed by the Royal Canadian Navy) (torpedoed 22 August 1944, by U-354 west of the North Cape)
- HMS Premier ^{X}
- HMS Queen ^{X}
- HMS Rajah
- HMS Ranee
- HMS Ruler ^{XX}
- HMS Shah ^{X}
- HMS Thane (torpedoed 15 January 1945, by U-1172 in the Clyde estuary).

^{X} = Fitted for anti-submarine warfare.
^{XX} = Fitted for strike-operations.
All the others were mainly used for aircraft transport with an added strike capability.

== Bibliography ==
- Cocker, Maurice (2008). Aircraft-Carrying Ships of the Royal Navy. Stroud, Gloucestershire: The History Press. ISBN 978-0-7524-4633-2.
