= USS Copahee =

Bogue-class escort carrier of the US Navy

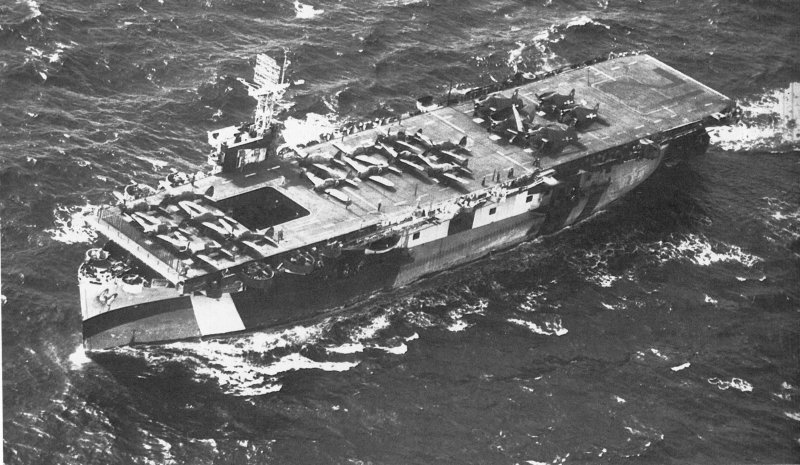
- USS Copahee in 1944

History

United States
- Name: USS Copahee
- Namesake: Copahee Sound in South Carolina
- Laid down: 18 June 1941
- Launched: 21 October 1941
- Commissioned: 15 June 1942
- Decommissioned: 5 July 1946
- Stricken: 1 March 1959
- Fate: Scrapped in 1961

General characteristics
- Class & type: Bogue-class escort carrier
- Displacement: 7,800 tons
- Length: 495.7 ft (151.1 m)
- Beam: 111.5 ft (34.0 m)
- Draft: 26 ft (7.9 m)
- Propulsion: 2 boilers (285 psi); 1 steam turbine; 1 shaft; 8,500 shp (6.3 MW)
- Speed: 16.5 knots (30.6 km/h)
- Complement: 890 officers and men
- Armament: 2 × 4"/50, 5"/38 or 5"/51 guns, 8 twin × 40 mm, 27 × 20 mm guns
- Aircraft carried: 24

USS Copahee (CVE-12) was a Bogue-class escort carrier that served in the United States Navy during World War II. Originally classified AVG-12, was changed to ACV-12, 20 August 1942; CVE-12, 15 July 1943; and CVHE-12, 12 June 1955.

She was laid down on 18 June 1941, as Steel Architect, under Maritime Commission contract (hull 169) in Tacoma, Washington by Todd Pacific Shipyards, launched 21 October 1941; sponsored by Mrs. W. M. Wells; acquired by the United States Navy on 8 February 1942; and commissioned 15 June 1942, Commander J. G. Farrell in command.

== Service history ==
Sailing from Alameda 5 September 1942, Copahee arrived at Nouméa 28 September with her cargo of planes, stores and passengers. From 7 October to 11 October, she cruised toward Guadalcanal to launch 20 Marine fighter planes and 18 SBD-3s of VMSB-141 for Henderson Field, then returned to San Diego, California 29 October for overhaul.

After training at Pearl Harbor, Copahee sailed to San Diego, arriving 25 February 1943 to begin transport duty carrying aircraft, aviation stores and personnel to the forward bases in the New Hebrides, Fijis, and New Caledonia as well as islands in the Hawaiian chain, departing San Diego on 10 March 1943 until 7 June 1943.

Between 2 September 1943 and 19 January 1944, she made two voyages to deliver aircraft at Townsville and Brisbane, Australia, and one to Pearl Harbor. She sailed from San Diego 10 April to ferry aircraft from Pearl Harbor to Majuro until 3 June, when she began supporting the Marianas operation by supplying replacement pilots and aircraft to carriers of the 5th Fleet. On 28 July 1944, she returned to San Diego, California with a load of captured Japanese planes (13 Mitsubishi A6M Zeros and 1 Nakajima B5N "Kate") and equipment (37 engines) to be used for intelligence and training purposes.

After overhaul, Copahee returned to transport duty. Until the end of the war she made six voyages from Alameda, carrying her vital cargo to Manus, Majuro, Guam, Saipan, and Pearl Harbor. From 6 September to 21 December 1945, she participated in Operation Magic Carpet, returning homeward-bound servicemen from Saipan, Guam, Eniwetok, and the Philippines to the west coast. She returned to Alameda 21 December 1945, and was decommissioned and placed in reserve at Tacoma, Washington, 5 July 1946.

Copahee was redesignated as a helicopter escort carrier (CVHE-12) on 12 June 1955. Stricken for disposal on 1 March 1959, Copahee was sold for scrap in 1961.

== Awards ==
Copahee received one battle star for World War II service.
