= HMS Puncher (D79) =

1944 Ruler-class escort aircraft carrier

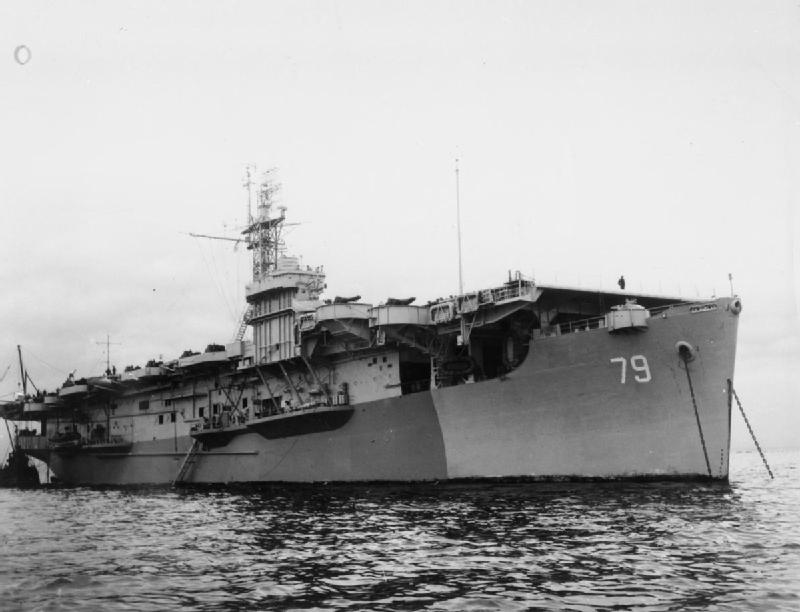
- HMS Puncher in April 1945

History

United States
- Name: USS Willapa
- Namesake: Willapa Bay in Washington
- Builder: Seattle-Tacoma Shipbuilding Corporation
- Laid down: 21 May 1943
- Launched: 8 November 1943
- Fate: Transferred to the Royal Navy

United Kingdom
- Name: HMS Puncher
- Commissioned: 5 February 1944
- Decommissioned: 16 February 1946
- Identification: Pennant number D79
- Honours and awards: Atlantic 1944
- Fate: Returned to US, sold as a merchant ship 9 January 1947
- Name: Muncaster Castle (1949–54); Bardic (1954–59); Ben Nevis (1959–73)
- In service: 1949
- Out of service: 1973
- Fate: Scrapped in 1973

General characteristics
- Class & type: Ruler-class escort carrier (UK)
- Displacement: 11,400 long tons (11,600 t) (standard); 15,390 long tons (15,640 t) (full)
- Length: 492 ft 3 in (150.0 m)
- Beam: 69 ft 6 in (21.2 m) wl; 108 ft 6 in (33.1 m) max
- Draught: 25 ft 5 in (7.7 m)
- Installed power: 2 × Foster Wheeler boilers; 8,500 shp (6,338 kW)
- Propulsion: 1 × Allis-Chalmers geared steam turbine; 1 shaft
- Speed: 18 knots (33 km/h)
- Range: 27,500 nmi (50,930 km) at 11 knots (20 km/h) max
- Endurance: 3,160 long tons (3,210 t) fuel oil
- Complement: 646
- Sensors & processing systems: SG surface search radar; SK air search radar
- Armament: 2 × 5-inch (127 mm)/51 cal. guns; 8 × twin 40 mm Bofors guns; 14 × twin Oerlikon 20 mm cannon; 7 × single Oerlikon 20 mm cannon
- Aircraft carried: 18–24
- Aviation facilities: 450 ft × 80 ft (137 m × 24 m) flight deck; 260 ft × 62 ft × 18 ft (79 m × 19 m × 5 m) hangar

USS Willapa (AVG-53/ACV-53/CVE-53) was a Bogue-class escort carrier (originally an auxiliary aircraft carrier) built during World War II for the United States Navy. Never seeing American service, the ship was transferred to the United Kingdom as part of Lend-Lease. The escort carrier was renamed HMS Puncher (D79) of the British Ruler class and crewed by the Royal Canadian Navy with aircrew from the Fleet Air Arm. Primarily used as an aircraft transport, Puncher took part in operations along the Norwegian coast towards the end of the war. Following the war the ship was converted for mercantile service and renamed Muncaster Castle, Bardic and Ben Nevis, before being broken up in 1973.

== Design and description ==
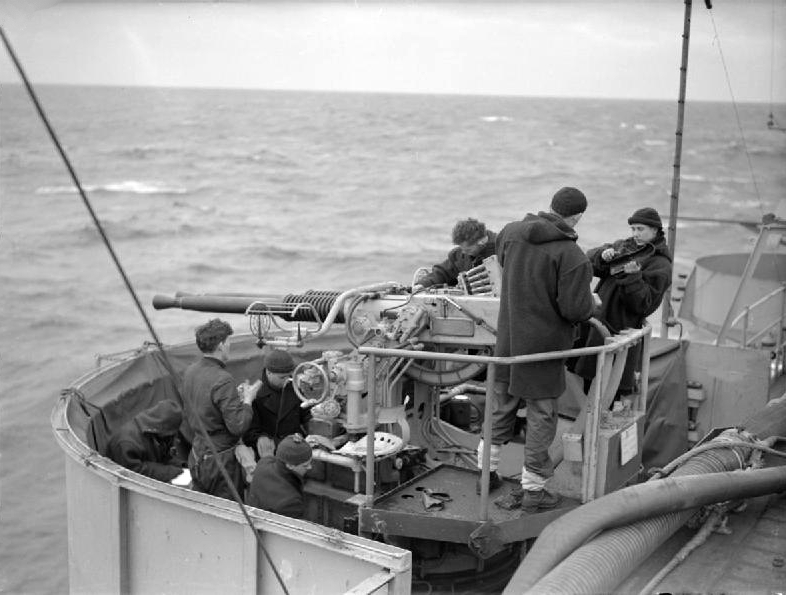
A typical twin 40 mm Bofors anti-aircraft gun

The Bogue class were larger and had a greater aircraft capacity than all the preceding American-built escort carriers. They were also all laid down as escort carriers and not converted merchant ships. The Ruler type vessels were essentially a repeat version of the Attacker class. Based on the Type C3 design, the Ruler class were acquired by the Royal Navy as part of Lend-Lease after delays in the construction of the Casablanca class, which the Royal Navy had intended to acquire. All the vessels in the class had a complement of 646 officers and ratings and an overall length of 492 feet 3 inches (150.0 m), a beam of 69 feet 6 inches (21.2 m) at the waterline and 108 feet 6 inches (33.07 m) total with a mean draught of 25 ft 5 in (7.7 m). The escort carriers had a standard displacement of 11,400 long tons (11,600 t) and a deep load displacement of 15,390 long tons (15,640 t). Propulsion was provided by one shaft turned by an Allis-Chalmers geared steam turbine powered by two Foster Wheeler boilers, rated at 8,500 shaft horsepower (6,338 kW), which could propel the ship at maximum 18 knots (33 km/h). The escort carrier could carry 3,160 long tons (3,210 t) of fuel oil and had a maximum range of 27,500 nautical miles (50,930 km) at 11 knots (20 km/h) or 18,750 nautical miles (34,725 km) at maximum speed.

Aircraft operations were commanded from a small combined bridge–flight control on the starboard side of the ship. The flight deck was 450 feet (137 m) long and 80 feet (24 m) wide. The H4C hydraulic aircraft catapult was capable of launching 16,000-pound (7,257 kg) aircraft at 74 knots (137 km/h). To receive aircraft the ship was equipped with nine arrestor wires capable of taking 19,800-pound (9,000 kg) aircraft at 55 knots (102 km/h), backed up by three aircraft barriers. Two aircraft elevators accessed the hangar, with the forward elevator being 42 feet (12.8 m) long by 34 feet (10.4 m) wide and the aft elevator being 34 feet wide and 42 feet long with both capable of taking 14,000-pound (6,350 kg) aircraft. Aircraft could be housed in the 260-by-62-by-18-foot (79.2 by 18.9 by 5.5 m) hangar below the flight deck. However, the sloping contour of the hangar combined with the elevator arrangement made handling and storage of aircraft difficult and time-consuming. The escort carriers could store 3,600 imperial gallons (16,366 L; 4,323 US gal) of avgas. They had a maximum aircraft capacity of twenty-four aircraft which could be a mixture of fighter and anti-submarine (ASW) aircraft, though up to 90 could be ferried.

Armament comprised two Mark 9 5-inch (127 mm)/51 calibre guns, eight twin-mounted 40 mm Bofors guns, fourteen twin-mounted 20 mm Oerlikon cannon and seven single-mounted 20 mm Oerlikon cannon. Since the escort carriers came as part of Lend-Lease, they retained their American radar systems, with the SG 10-inch (254 mm) surface radar and the SK 1.5 cm (1 in) air search radar. (Note: The 50 calibre denotes the length of the gun. This means that the length of the gun barrel is 50 times the bore diameter.)

== Construction and career ==
Willapa was laid down on 21 May 1943 at Seattle, Washington, by the Seattle-Tacoma Shipbuilding Corporation and reclassified CVE-53 on 10 June 1943. Willapa was launched on 8 November 1943. The ship was completed and transferred under lend-lease to the Royal Navy on 5 February 1944 and commissioned as HMS Puncher with the pennant number D79. On 15 March 1944, Puncher arrived at Vancouver to undergo conversion to Royal Navy standards. The British Admiralty had agreed that, after the end of World War II, the Royal Canadian Navy would have its own aircraft carriers. For this reason, Puncher and Nabob were crewed by Royal Canadian Navy personnel to establish the knowledge base for the future carriers. However, as the Royal Canadian Navy lacked trained air personnel, the aircrew was from the Fleet Air Arm. Puncher remained under British control due to stipulations in the Lend-Lease act that prevented the Royal Navy from transferring Lend-Lease equipment to a third party.

Puncher spent the war in the Atlantic Ocean and Mediterranean Sea. In June 1944, the escort carrier transported motor launches from New Orleans to New York. The following month, the ship transported United States Army Air Force aircraft from Norfolk, Virginia, to Casablanca in North Africa, then returned to Norfolk. From there, Puncher made two more ferry trips, taking the Vought Corsairs meant for 1845 Naval Air Squadron to the United Kingdom. Following the ferry trips, Puncher put in for repairs to builder's defects. On 21 November 1944, Puncher embarked 821 Naval Air Squadron for trials in the Clyde area. However, on 22 November, the ship suffered a main gear failure and was forced to return to port for repairs. The gearbox proved too damaged for repair, and her sister ship, Nabob, had been laid up at Firth of Forth due to being torpedoed off Norway in August 1944, so a gearbox was removed from Nabob and installed aboard Puncher.

On 1 February 1945, Puncher joined the British Home Fleet at Scapa Flow, embarking 881 Naval Air Squadron in Grumman Wildcats and 821 Naval Air Squadron in Fairey Barracudas. Initially serving in a training role, within the year, Puncher was re-tasked to both airstrike and combat air patrol (CAP) missions, as the damaged Nabob had been decommissioned. Operations included strikes against military sites in German-occupied Norway and CAP missions covering mine-laying operations of her sister ship HMS Premier. On 11 February, Puncher's Wildcats formed part of the fighter escort for a minelaying airstrike along the western coast of Norway. The escort carrier's aircraft then provided fighter cover for a British minesweeping mission clearing German-laid mines along the Norwegian coast. On 24 March, Puncher's aircraft took part in an airstrike in the area of Trondheim. A second strike was planned for 3 April but was cancelled due to bad weather. Beginning on 25 June 1945, following the surrender of Germany, Puncher was utilized as a troop transport, carrying Canadian soldiers back to Canada. Her hangar had bunks welded into them and was used in this role until the end of 1945.

Paid off on 16 February 1946 at Norfolk, Virginia and returned to American custody that day, the escort carrier was struck from the Navy Registry on 12 March 1946, having never seen active service with the United States Navy. The vessel was initially sold to William B. St. John, of New York City, on 9 January 1947. The ship was subsequently resold to the British firm J. Chambers & Co on 4 February 1947 and converted for mercantile service. The ship reappeared as Muncaster Castle in 1949 and was renamed Bardic in 1954. The vessel was sold to Ben Line Steamers in 1959 and renamed Ben Nevis (sometimes spelled as Bennevis). The vessel sailed under that name until she was sold for scrap and broken up at Kaoshiung, Taiwan on 11 June 1973 by Swie Horng Steel Enterprise Co.
