= HMS Trouncer (D85) =

American escort carrier transferred to the Royal Navy

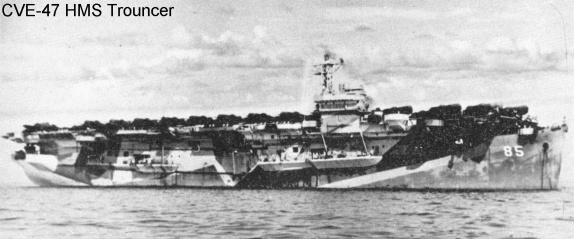

History

United Kingdom
- Name: HMS Trouncer
- Builder: Seattle-Tacoma Shipbuilding Corporation
- Laid down: 1 February 1943
- Launched: 16 June 1943
- Commissioned: 31 January 1944
- Decommissioned: 12 April 1946
- Identification: Pennant number:D85
- Fate: Sold as Merchant ship; scrapped 1973

General characteristics
- Class & type: Bogue-class escort carrier (USA); Ruler-class escort carrier (UK)
- Displacement: 9,800 tons
- Length: 495 ft 8 in (151.08 m)
- Beam: 69 ft 6 in (21.18 m)
- Draught: 26 ft (7.9 m)
- Speed: 18 knots (33 km/h)
- Complement: 890 officers and men
- Armament: 2 × 4"/50, 5"/38 or 5"/51 guns; 8 × twin 40 mm Bofors; 27 × single 20 mm Oerlikon
- Aircraft carried: 28

Service record
- Operations: Battle of the Atlantic

The USS Perdido (CVE-47) (previously AVG-47, later ACV-47) was a Bogue-class escort carrier laid down as ACV-47 under Maritime Commission contract by Seattle-Tacoma Shipbuilding of Tacoma, Washington, 1 February 1943; launched 16 June 1943; sponsored by Mrs. H. M. Bemis, reclassified as CVE-47 on 15 July 1943; and completed at the Commercial Iron Works, Portland, Oregon.

Assigned to the United Kingdom under lend lease 23 June 1943, Perdido was taken over by the Royal Navy at Portland, 31 January 1944. During the remainder of World War II, she served the Royal Navy as Ruler-class escort carrier HMS Trouncer (D85) and took part in convoy escort and ASW patrol operations. The escort carrier returned to Norfolk, Virginia, 21 February 1946. Perdido was returned to the U.S. Navy 3 March 1946, and on 25 March, the Secretary of the Navy authorized her for disposal. Her name was struck from the Naval Register 12 April 1946. She was sold to William B. St. John, delivered to her purchaser 6 March 1947 and pressed into merchant service as Greystroke Castle (renamed Gallic in 1954 and Berinnes in 1959). She was sold for scrap in Taiwan in 1973.

== Design and description ==
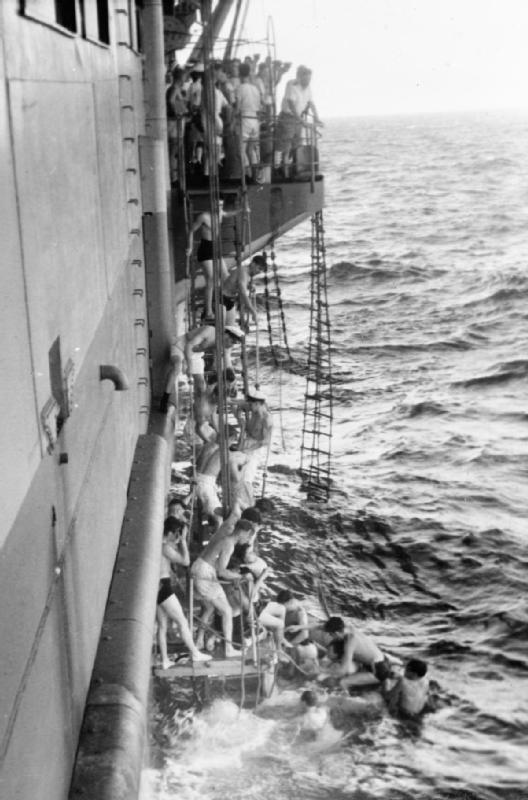
Survivors from the SS Empire Patrol board the Trouncer 1 October 1945, 38 miles off Port Said

These ships were all larger and had a greater aircraft capacity than all the preceding American built escort carriers. They were also all laid down as escort carriers and not converted merchant ships. All the ships had a complement of 646 men and an overall length of 492 feet 3 inches (150.0 m), a beam of 69 feet 6 inches (21.2 m) and a draught of 25 ft 6 in (7.8 m). Propulsion was provided a steam turbine, two boilers connected to one shaft giving 9,350 brake horsepower (SHP), which could propel the ship at 16.5 knots (30.6 km/h; 19.0 mph).

Aircraft facilities were a small combined bridge–flight control on the starboard side, two aircraft lifts 43 feet (13.1 m) by 34 feet (10.4 m), one aircraft catapult and nine arrestor wires. Aircraft could be housed in the 260 feet (79.2 m) by 62 feet (18.9 m) hangar below the flight deck. Armament comprised: two 4"/50, 5"/38 or 5"/51 Dual Purpose guns in single mounts, sixteen 40 mm Bofors anti-aircraft guns in twin mounts and twenty 20 mm Oerlikon anti-aircraft cannons in single mounts. They had a maximum aircraft capacity of twenty-four aircraft which could be a mixture of Grumman Martlet, Vought F4U Corsair or Hawker Sea Hurricane fighter aircraft and Fairey Swordfish or Grumman Avenger anti-submarine aircraft.
