= HMS Rajah =

Escort carrier

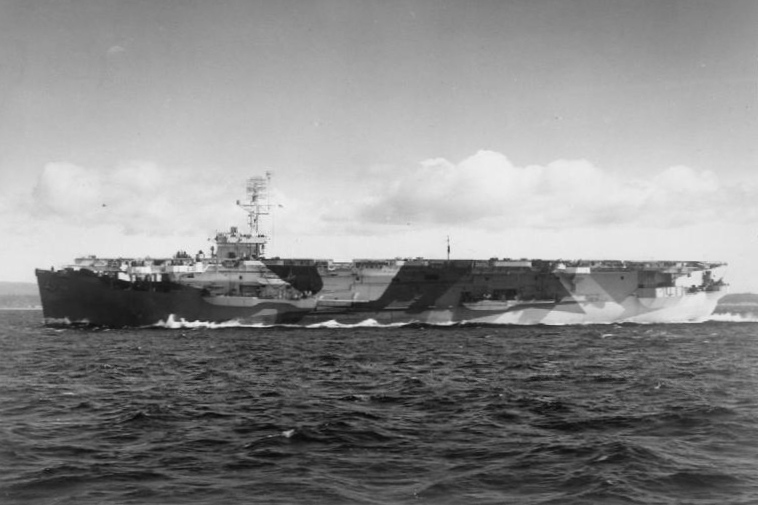
- Rajah in 1944

History

United States
- Name: USS Prince
- Builder: Seattle-Tacoma Shipbuilding Corporation
- Laid down: 17 December 1942
- Launched: 18 May 1943
- Fate: Transferred to Royal Navy

United Kingdom
- Name: HMS Rajah
- Commissioned: 17 January 1944
- Decommissioned: 7 February 1947
- Identification: Pennant number:D10
- Fate: Sold as a merchant ship; sold for scrap 1975

General characteristics
- Class & type: Bogue-class escort carrier (USA); Ruler-class escort carrier (UK)
- Displacement: 9,800 tons
- Length: 495 ft 7 in (151.05 m)
- Beam: 69 ft 6 in (21.18 m)
- Draught: 25 ft 6 in (7.77 m)
- Propulsion: Steam turbines, one shaft, 8,500 shp (6.3 MW)
- Speed: 17 knots (31 km/h)
- Complement: 646 officers and men
- Armament: 2 × 4"/50, 5"/38 or 5"/51 guns; 8 × twin 40 mm Bofors; 35 × single 20 mm Oerlikon
- Aircraft carried: 24

USS Prince (CVE-45) (originally named McClure, designated AVG-45 then later ACV-45) was an escort carrier laid down on 17 December 1942 by the Seattle-Tacoma Shipbuilding Corporation of Tacoma, Washington. She was renamed Prince on 13 November 1942 and launched on 18 May 1943. She was sponsored by Mrs. J. L. McGuigan, reclassified CVE-45 on 15 July 1943 and transferred to the United Kingdom under Lend-Lease on 17 October 1943.

Prince served the United Kingdom as HMS Rajah (D10). She was returned to the United States Navy at Norfolk, Virginia on 13 December 1946. She was struck from the Naval Vessel Registry on 7 February 1947 and delivered to her purchaser, Waterman Steamship Corporation, on 7 July. She became the merchant ship Drente (later renamed Lambros, then Ulysses) in 1948. She was scrapped in Taiwan in 1975.

== Design and description ==
These ships were all larger and had a greater aircraft capacity than all the preceding American built escort carriers. They were also all laid down as escort carriers and not converted merchant ships. All the ships had a complement of 646 men and an overall length of 492 feet 3 inches (150.0 m), a beam of 69 feet 6 inches (21.2 m) and a draught of 25 ft 6 in (7.8 m). Propulsion was provided by two boilers connected to a steam turbine, which was connected to one shaft, giving 9,350 brake horsepower (SHP). This could propel the ship at 16.5 knots (30.6 km/h; 19.0 mph).

Aircraft facilities were a small combined bridge–flight control on the starboard side, two aircraft lifts 43 feet (13.1 m) by 34 feet (10.4 m), one catapult and nine arrestor wires. Aircraft could be housed in the 260 feet (79.2 m) by 62 feet (18.9 m) hangar below the flight deck. The ship's armament comprised: two 4"/50, 5"/38 or 5"/51 Dual Purpose guns in single mounts, sixteen 40 mm Bofors anti-aircraft guns in twin mounts and twenty 20 mm Oerlikon anti-aircraft cannons in single mounts. Each ship had a maximum capacity of twenty-four aircraft which could be a mixture of Grumman Martlet, Vought F4U Corsair or Hawker Sea Hurricane fighters and Fairey Swordfish or Grumman Avenger anti-submarine aircraft.
