= HMS Speaker (D90) =

1943 escort carrier

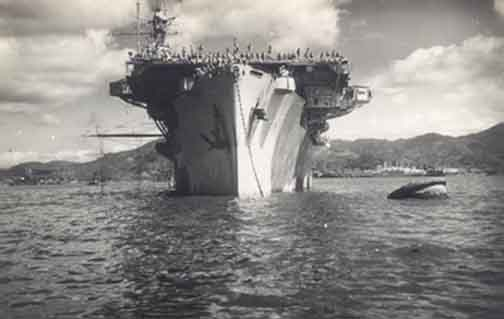
- HMS Speaker

History

United Kingdom
- Name: HMS Speaker
- Builder: Seattle-Tacoma Shipbuilding Corporation
- Laid down: 9 October 1942
- Launched: 20 February 1943
- Commissioned: 20 November 1943
- Decommissioned: 25 September 1946
- Identification: Pennant number:D90
- Fate: Merchant ship; sold for scrap 1972

General characteristics
- Class & type: Bogue-class escort carrier (USA); Ruler-class escort carrier (UK)
- Displacement: 8,333 tons
- Length: 496 ft (151 m)
- Beam: 69 ft 6 in (21.18 m)
- Draught: 23 ft 3 in (7.09 m)
- Speed: 18 knots (33 km/h)
- Complement: 646 officers and men
- Armament: 2 × 4"/50, 5"/38 or 5"/51 guns; 8 × twin 40 mm Bofors; 35 × single 20 mm Oerlikon
- Aircraft carried: 18-24

Service record
- Part of: British Pacific Fleet
- Operations: Battle of Okinawa

HMS Speaker (D90), a Ruler-class escort carrier, based on a "C3" hull, was originally the Bogue-class USS Delgada (AVG/ACV/CVE-40), which was transferred to the United Kingdom under the Lend-Lease program.

== Design and description ==
These ships were all larger and had a greater aircraft capacity than all the preceding American built escort carriers. They were also all laid down as escort carriers and not converted merchant ships. All the ships had a complement of 646 men and an overall length of 492 feet 3 inches (150.0 m), a beam of 69 feet 6 inches (21.2 m) and a draught of 25 ft 6 in (7.8 m). Propulsion was provided by one shaft, two boilers and a steam turbine giving 9,350 shaft horsepower (SHP), which could propel the ship at 16.5 knots (30.6 km/h; 19.0 mph).

Aircraft facilities were a small combined bridge–flight control on the starboard side, two aircraft lifts 43 feet (13.1 m) by 34 feet (10.4 m), one aircraft catapult and nine arrestor wires. Aircraft could be housed in the 260 feet (79.2 m) by 62 feet (18.9 m) hangar below the flight deck. Armament comprised: two 4"/50, 5"/38 or 5"/51 Dual Purpose guns in single mounts, sixteen 40 mm Bofors anti-aircraft guns in twin mounts and twenty 20 mm Oerlikon anti-aircraft cannons in single mounts. They had a maximum aircraft capacity of twenty-four aircraft which could be a mixture of Grumman Martlet, Vought F4U Corsair or Hawker Sea Hurricane fighter aircraft and Fairey Swordfish or Grumman Avenger anti-submarine aircraft.

== Preparations ==
Delgada was launched 20 February 1943 by the Seattle-Tacoma Shipbuilding Corporation, Seattle, Washington; sponsored by Mrs. James B. Sykes and reclassified CVE-40 on 15 July 1943. She was transferred to the United Kingdom under Lend-Lease on 20 November 1943, and served as HMS Speaker (D90).

After the loading of equipment, familiarisation by the Royal Navy sailing crew and a day's steaming trials, Speaker was accepted. She was formally commissioned on 20 November 1943, when the White Ensign was hoisted at a ceremony attended by the builders and the U.S. Naval authorities, and by 6 December she was ready to sail.

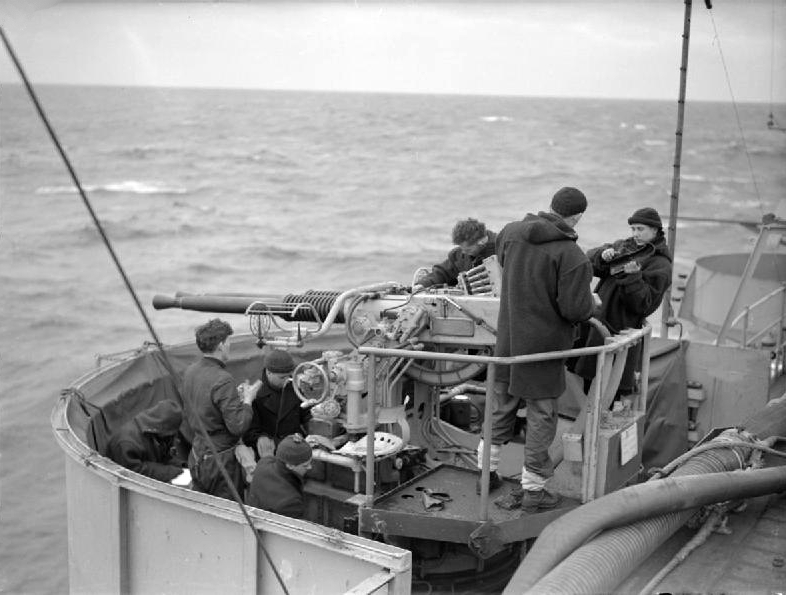
Twin 40 mm Bofors anti-aircraft gun.

As delivered, these carriers required modifications to conform to British standards and the initial works were done at Burrards at Vancouver, British Columbia, Canada. These included extending the flight deck, fitting redesigned Rying controls and fighter direction layout, modifications to hangar, accommodation and store rooms, extra safety measures, oiling at sea arrangements, gunnery and other internal communications, extra wireless and radio facilities, ship black-out arrangements and other necessary items.

After working up off Vancouver, a passage through the Panama Canal on 8 March 1944 (which required temporary adaptations to conform to the width restrictions), further works at Norfolk, Virginia and loading crated aircraft, stores and passengers at Staten Island, New York, Speaker sailed for Liverpool on 8 March. She sailed with an eastbound convoy and arrived on 8 April. She returned to the U.S. to perform a second aircraft ferry run.

On 17 May, she was at Greenock awaiting orders. Now required to be an assault aircraft carrier, supporting army operations, she underwent further modifications at the Caledon Shipbuilding & Engineering Company, Dundee.

While waiting for her squadron of Hellcats (1840 Naval Air Squadron) to complete their training, Speaker filled in as a training carrier from 16 October to 14 December. Nearly 1,500 landings were made by Fairey Barracuda, Fairey Swordfish and Curtiss Helldiver aircraft.

== En route to the Far East ==
In late December, Squadron 1840 embarked with new rocket-fitted, Mk. III Hellcats. Speaker sailed from the Clyde for Gibraltar and the Mediterranean on 11 January 1945, in company with HMS Slinger, HMS Khedive and three destroyers. While passing through the Mediterranean, the flotilla flew an anti-submarine search off North Africa after a reported sighting by a merchantman, but without success. The flotilla continued on to join the Eastern Fleet at Colombo, Ceylon (now Sri Lanka). They paused briefly at Alexandria and refuelled at Aden. Flying practice continued en route, one aircraft and pilot being lost in an accident in the Red Sea.

At Colombo, where they arrived on 4 February, Speaker and Slinger were ordered onward to join the British Pacific Fleet (BPF) at Sydney, Australia. While off Western Australia, the two carriers assisted in a search for survivors of a troopship sinking. They arrived at Sydney on 23 February. Eight of Speaker's aircraft and pilots were transferred to HMS Indomitable. While in port, repairs and maintenance were completed and crew enjoyed shore leave in local homes.

== British Pacific Fleet ==
Speaker left Sydney on 9 March for the BPF forward base at Manus Island, via the Jomard Passage. After a short and bleak stay, and now part of 30th Aircraft Carrier Squadron, they sailed on 18 March with Striker and an escort led by HMS Kempenfelt. Their role was to provide air cover (Combat Air Patrol) for the British fuelling area during Operation Iceberg (the invasion of Okinawa). The escort for the "logistic" force were British and Australian destroyers, sloops, frigates and corvettes (such as Pheasant, Crane, Woodcock, Whimbul, Avon, Derg, Findhorn, Parrett, Bathhurst, Cessnock, Pirie and Whyalla).

Despite the routine nature of the duty and the lack of combat action, the morale of the logistic force and its escorts remained high.

On 23 May, the BPF retired to Leyte, for replenishment and Speaker's remaining pilots and aircraft, and some maintenance personnel, were transferred to Indomitable to boost front-line strength. Speaker was transferred to be a replenishment carrier, with a supply of replacement aircraft for the fleet's operational losses and receiving "flyable duds" for repair and injured crew for treatment on the hospital ship Oxfordshire.

Operation Iceberg completed in mid-May and the BPF returned to Sydney for repairs, storing and shore leave for the crews. En route, Speaker took a sick Australian soldier off an American troopship (Pontius H. Ross) for emergency surgery.

== Post-war ==
HMS Speaker was returned to the United States on 27 July 1946 having stopped at the Royal Naval Dockyard in Bermuda on 18 July where she disembarked Captain S.V. Jethson, RN, to take over duties as Captain Superintendent from Commodore-in-Charge Rear Admiral CH Knox-Little and as Captain-in-Charge of HM Naval Establishments in Bermuda and Commanding Officer of HMS Malabar, and Bermudian soldiers returning from overseas service in the Second World War, then having arrived at Norfolk Navy Yard on 20 July. The flight deck was removed and was sold into merchant service 22 April 1947 as Lancero (later renamed President Osmena in 1965 and Lucky One in 1971). The ship was sold for scrap in Taiwan in 1972.
