= HMS Smiter (D55) =

1943 Bogue-class auxiliary aircraft carrier

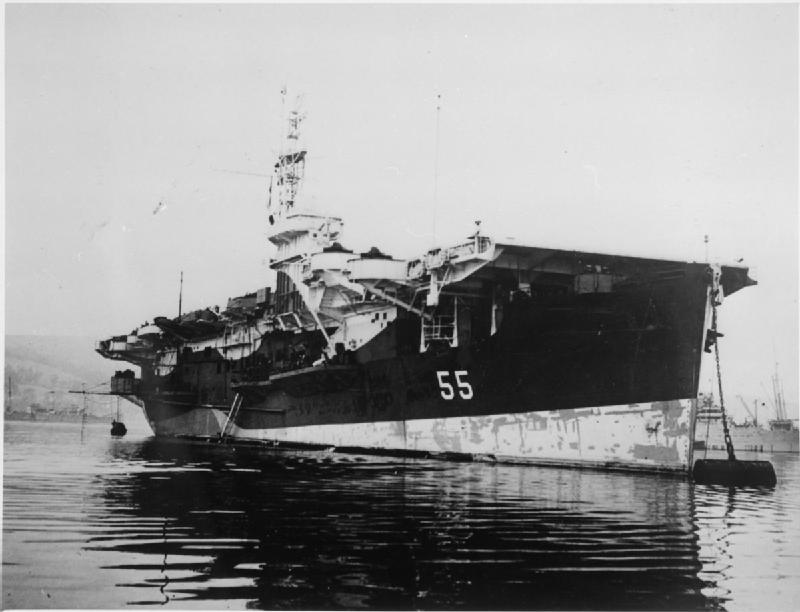
- HMS Smiter

History

United States
- Name: USS Vermillion
- Namesake: Vermillion Bay in Louisiana
- Builder: Seattle-Tacoma Shipbuilding Corporation
- Laid down: 10 May 1943
- Launched: 27 September 1943
- Fate: Transferred to Royal Navy

United Kingdom
- Name: HMS Smiter
- Commissioned: 20 January 1944
- Decommissioned: 6 May 1946
- Identification: Pennant number:D55
- Fate: Sold as merchant ship SS Artillero; wrecked 1967

General characteristics
- Class & type: Bogue-class escort carrier (US); Ruler-class escort carrier (UK)
- Displacement: 7,800 tons
- Length: 495 ft 8 in (151.08 m)
- Beam: 69 ft 6 in (21.18 m)
- Draught: 26 ft (7.9 m)
- Propulsion: Steam turbines, 1 shaft, 8,500 shp (6.3 MW)
- Speed: 17.5 knots (32.4 km/h)
- Complement: 890 officers and men
- Armament: 2 × 4"/50, 5"/38 or 5"/51 guns; 4 × twin 40 mm Bofors; 10 × single 20 mm Oerlikon
- Aircraft carried: 28

USS Vermillion (CVE-52) (previously AVG-52 then later ACV-52) was laid down on 10 May 1943 by the Seattle-Tacoma Shipbuilding Corporation as a Bogue-class auxiliary aircraft carrier; redesignated an escort aircraft carrier, on 10 June 1943; assigned to the United Kingdom under Lend-Lease on 23 June 1943; launched on 27 September 1943; and accepted by Britain on 20 January 1944.

== Service history ==
Commissioned in the Royal Navy as HMS Smiter (D55) (pronounced "smite·er"), designated a Ruler-class escort carrier, she served the British throughout the remainder of World War II. She returned to the United States at Norfolk Naval Base, Virginia on 20 March 1946 and was officially transferred back to the United States Navy on 6 April 1946. She was immediately determined to be surplus to the needs of the Navy and was designated for sale. Her name was struck from the Navy Registry on 6 May 1946.

On 28 January 1947, she was sold to the Newport News Shipbuilding and Drydock Company, Norfolk, Virginia, for conversion to mercantile service. She was subsequently resold to Compania Argentina de Navigacion Dodero, S.A., and entered mercantile service in 1948 at Buenos Aires as SS Artillero (renamed President Garcia in 1965). She was wrecked off Guernsey in July 1967, deemed a total loss and was scrapped at Hamburg in November of the same year.

== Design and description ==
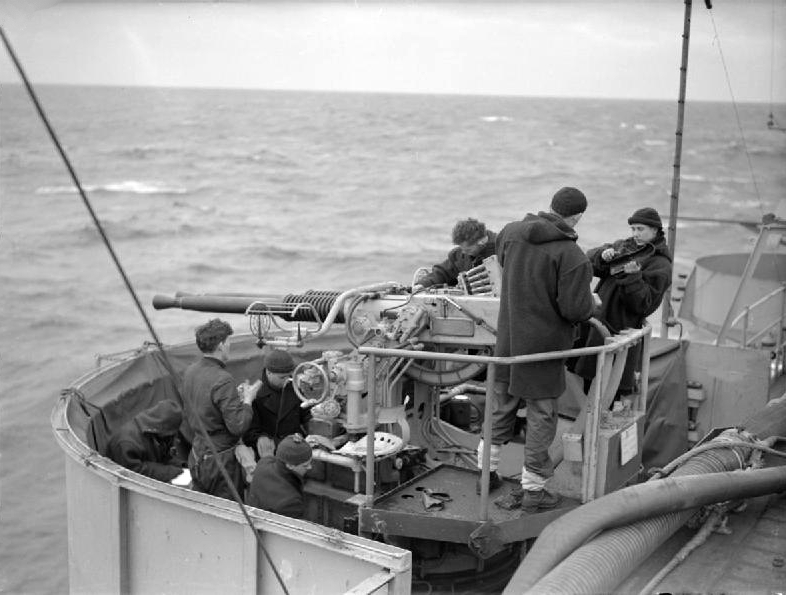
Twin 40 mm Bofors anti-aircraft gun.

These ships were all larger and had a greater aircraft capacity than all the preceding American built escort carriers. They were also all laid down as escort carriers and not converted merchant ships. All the ships had a complement of 646 men and an overall length of 492 feet 3 inches (150.0 m), a beam of 69 feet 6 inches (21.2 m) and a draught of 25 ft 6 in (7.8 m). Propulsion was provided by one shaft, two boilers and a steam turbine giving 9,350 shaft horsepower (SHP), which could propel the ship at 16.5 knots (30.6 km/h; 19.0 mph).

Aircraft facilities were a small combined bridge–flight control on the starboard side, two aircraft lifts 43 feet (13.1 m) by 34 feet (10.4 m), one aircraft catapult and nine arrestor wires. Aircraft could be housed in the 260 feet (79.2 m) by 62 feet (18.9 m) hangar below the flight deck. Armament comprised: two 4"/50, 5"/38 or 5"/51 Dual Purpose guns in single mounts, sixteen 40 mm Bofors anti-aircraft guns in twin mounts and twenty 20 mm Oerlikon anti-aircraft cannon in single mounts. They had a maximum aircraft capacity of twenty-four aircraft which could be a mixture of Grumman Martlet, Vought F4U Corsair or Hawker Sea Hurricane fighter aircraft and Fairey Swordfish or Grumman Avenger anti-submarine aircraft.
