= HMS Thane =

American escort carrier transferred to the Royal Navy

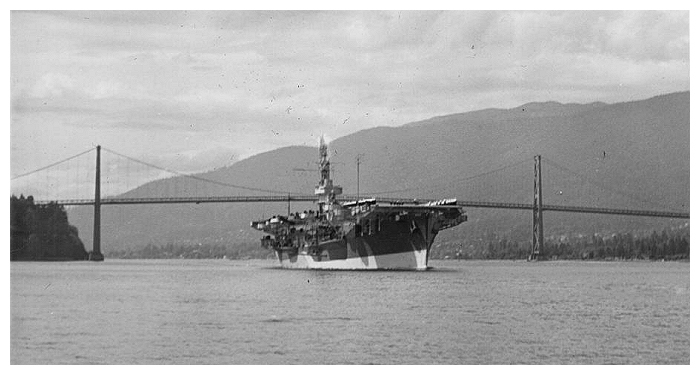

History

United Kingdom
- Name: HMS Thane
- Builder: Seattle-Tacoma Shipbuilding Corporation
- Laid down: 23 February 1943
- Launched: 15 July 1943
- Commissioned: 19 November 1943
- Decommissioned: October 1945
- Identification: Pennant number:D48
- Fate: Sold for scrap

General characteristics
- Class & type: Bogue-class escort carrier (USA); Ruler-class escort carrier (UK)
- Displacement: 7,800 tons
- Length: 495 ft 8 in (151.08 m)
- Beam: 69 ft 6 in (21.18 m)
- Draught: 26 ft (7.9 m)
- Speed: 17.5 knots (32.4 km/h)
- Complement: 890 officers and men
- Armament: 2 × 4"/50, 5"/38 or 5"/51 guns; 51 × twin 40 mm Bofors; 10 × single 20 mm Oerlikon
- Aircraft carried: 28

Service record
- Operations: Battle of the Atlantic

USS Sunset (CVE-48) (previously AVG-48 then ACV-48) was a Bogue-class escort carrier. Assigned on 23 August 1942 to MC hull 259, a modified C3-S-A1 laid down on 23 February 1943 by Seattle-Tacoma Shipbuilding of Tacoma, Washington; launched on 15 July and redesignated CVE-48 the same day; sponsored by Mrs. C.E. Taylor. She was transferred to the United Kingdom under Lend-Lease agreement on 19 November; and commissioned the same day as HMS Thane (D48), a Ruler-class escort carrier in the Royal Navy.

HMS Thane operated in the North Atlantic protecting convoys and ferrying aircraft for use in the European Theater. On 15 January 1945, while ferrying aircraft in the Irish Sea, she was torpedoed by the German submarine U-1172 and severely damaged, losing her starboard aft 5 inch gun and its sponson, disabling propulsion, and losing 10 men. Taken to Gare Loch in the Firth of Clyde, southwest Scotland, she was examined, declared a constructive total loss and decommissioned to reserve. She was returned to United States custody while in the United Kingdom on 12 May. Determined to be of no use to the United States Navy, she was slated for disposal in October; and she was subsequently scrapped.

== Design and description ==
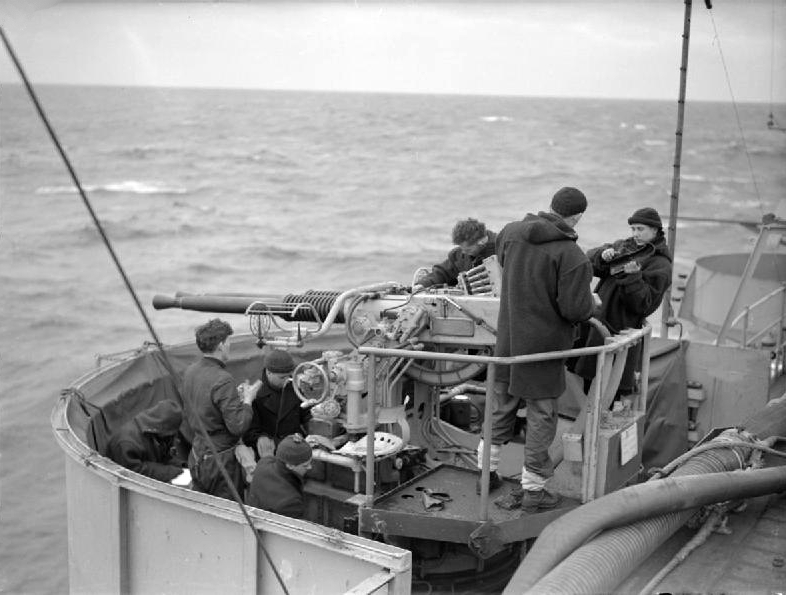
Twin 40 mm Bofors anti-aircraft gun.

These ships were all larger and had a greater aircraft capacity than all the preceding American built escort carriers. They were also all laid down as escort carriers and not converted merchant ships. All the ships had a complement of 646 men and an overall length of 492 feet 3 inches (150.0 m), a beam of 69 feet 6 inches (21.2 m) and a draught of 25 ft 6 in (7.8 m). Propulsion was provided a steam turbine, two boilers connected to one shaft giving 9,350 shaft horsepower (6,970 kW), which could propel the ship at 16.5 knots (30.6 km/h; 19.0 mph).

Aircraft facilities were a small combined bridge–flight control on the starboard side, two aircraft lifts 43 feet (13.1 m) by 34 feet (10.4 m), one aircraft catapult and nine arrestor wires. Aircraft could be housed in the 260 feet (79.2 m) by 62 feet (18.9 m) hangar below the flight deck. Armament comprised: two 4"/50, 5"/38 or 5"/51 Dual Purpose guns in single mounts, sixteen 40 mm Bofors anti-aircraft guns in twin mounts and twenty 20 mm Oerlikon anti-aircraft cannons in single mounts. They had a maximum aircraft capacity of twenty-four aircraft which could be a mixture of Grumman Martlet, Vought F4U Corsair or Hawker Sea Hurricane fighter aircraft and Fairey Swordfish or Grumman Avenger anti-submarine aircraft.

The last voyage of Thane brought the first helicopters to the UK. Nine Sikorsky R-4B Hoverflys were flown on at Norfolk, Virginia on 29–30 December 1944, snowy weather delaying the loading of half of them to the following day. On arrival of the damaged Thane, seven were flown off to RDU Abbotsinch and two, thought to be damaged, were craned off.
