= HMS Patroller =

1943 Ruler-class escort carrier of the Royal Navy

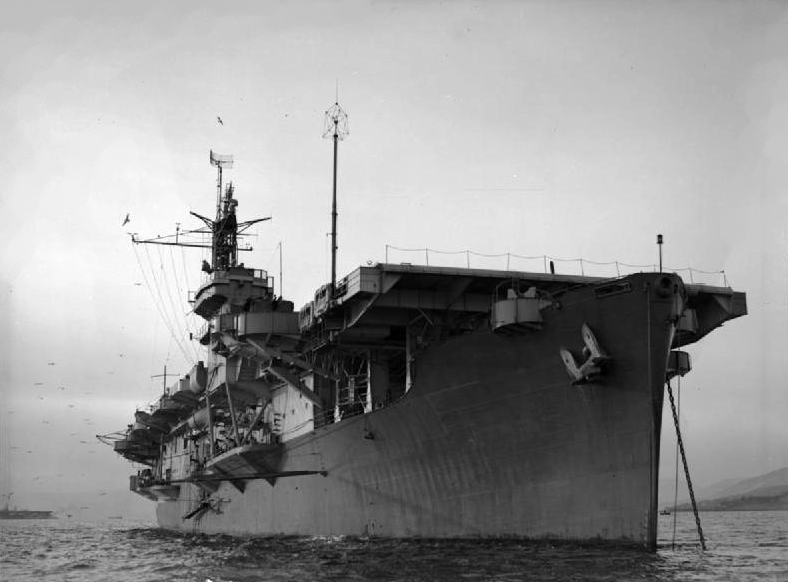
- Ruler-class escort carrier

History

United States
- Name: USS Keweenaw
- Builder: Seattle-Tacoma Shipbuilding Corporation
- Laid down: 27 November 1942
- Launched: 6 May 1943
- Fate: Transferred to Royal Navy 22 October 1943

United Kingdom
- Name: HMS Patroller
- Commissioned: 25 October 1943
- Decommissioned: 7 February 1947
- Out of service: Returned to the US Navy 13 December 1946
- Identification: Pennant number:D07
- Fate: Sold as merchant ship; renamed Almkerk 1948 and Pacific Alliance 1969 sold for scrap 1974

General characteristics
- Class & type: Bogue-class escort carrier (USA); Ruler-class escort carrier (UK)
- Displacement: 9,800 tons
- Length: 492 ft 3 in (150.0 m)
- Beam: 69 ft 6 in (21.2 m)
- Draught: 25 ft 6 in (7.8 m)
- Propulsion: Steam turbines, 1 shaft, 9,350 shp
- Speed: 17 knots (31 km/h)
- Complement: 646
- Armament: 2 × 4"/50, 5"/38 or 5"/51 Dual Purpose guns in single mounts; 16 X 40 mm Bofors anti-aircraft guns in twin mounts; 20 X 20 mm Oerlikon anti-aircraft cannons in single mounts
- Aircraft carried: 24
- Aviation facilities: 2 X aircraft lifts 43 ft (13.1 m) by 34 ft (10.4 m); 1 X aircraft catapult; 9 X arrestor wires

HMS Patroller was an escort carrier in the Royal Navy during the Second World War. Laid down in 1942 at the Seattle-Tacoma Shipbuilding company, she was originally named USS Keweenaw (CVE-44). USS Keweenaw (previously AVG-44 then later ACV-44) was an escort carrier laid down under Maritime Commission contract by Seattle-Tacoma Shipbuilding of Tacoma, Washington, 27 November 1942; launched 6 May 1943; sponsored by Mrs. R. G. Risley; assigned to the United Kingdom 10 June 1943; reclassified CVE-44 on 15 July 1943; and transferred to the United Kingdom under lend-lease 22 October 1943.

During the remainder of war, she served the Royal Navy as HMS Patroller and operated in the Atlantic on convoy escort and patrol duty, with brief stints as a transport carrier for both the Army and Navy. Arriving Norfolk, Virginia, 9 December 1946, she was returned to the United States Navy the same day. Her name was struck from the Naval Vessel Registry 7 February 1947 and she was sold to Waterman Steamship Corp., 26 August 1947 as Almkerk (later renamed Pacific Reliance). She was scrapped in Taiwan in 1974.

== Design and description ==
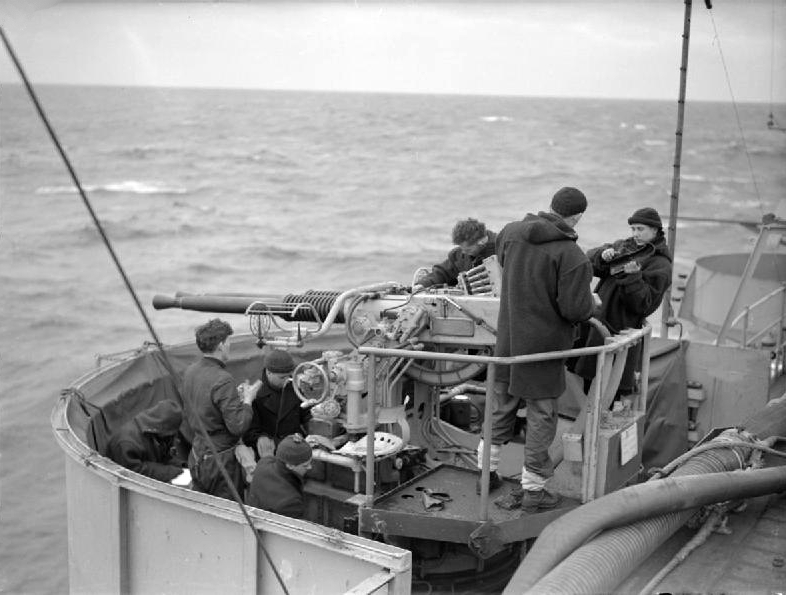
Twin 40 mm Bofors anti-aircraft gun.

These ships were all larger and had a greater aircraft capacity than all the preceding American built escort carriers. They were also all laid down as escort carriers and not converted merchant ships. All the ships had a complement of 646 men and an overall length of 492 feet 3 inches (150.0 m), a beam of 69 feet 6 inches (21.2 m) and a draught of 25 ft 6 in (7.8 m). Propulsion was provided by one shaft, two boilers and a steam turbine giving 9,350 shaft horsepower (SHP), which could propel the ship at 16.5 knots (30.6 km/h; 19.0 mph).

Aircraft facilities were a small combined bridge–flight control on the starboard side, two aircraft lifts 43 feet (13.1 m) by 34 feet (10.4 m), one aircraft catapult and nine arrestor wires. Aircraft could be housed in the 260 feet (79.2 m) by 62 feet (18.9 m) hangar below the flight deck. Armament comprised: two 4"/50, 5"/38 or 5"/51 Dual Purpose guns in single mounts, sixteen 40 mm Bofors anti-aircraft guns in twin mounts and twenty 20 mm Oerlikon anti-aircraft cannons in single mounts. They had a maximum aircraft capacity of twenty-four aircraft which could be a mixture of Grumman Martlet, Vought F4U Corsair or Hawker Sea Hurricane fighter aircraft and Fairey Swordfish or Grumman Avenger anti-submarine aircraft.
