= HMS Premier =

American escort carrier transferred to the Royal Navy

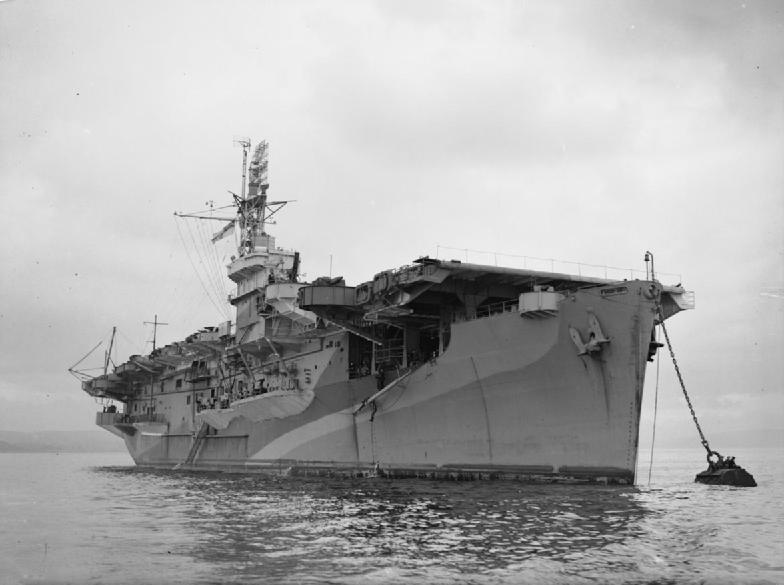
- HMS Premier

History

United States
- Name: USS Estero
- Namesake: Estero Island in Florida
- Builder: Seattle-Tacoma Shipbuilding Corporation
- Laid down: 31 October 1942
- Launched: 22 March 1943
- Completed: October 1943
- Fate: Transferred to Royal Navy

United Kingdom
- Name: HMS Premier
- Commissioned: 3 November 1943
- Decommissioned: 21 May 1946
- Identification: Pennant number:D23
- Fate: Sold as merchant ship; for scrap 1974

General characteristics
- Class & type: Bogue-class escort carrier (USA); Ruler-class escort carrier (UK)
- Displacement: 16,620 tons (full)
- Length: 495 ft 7 in (151.05 m)
- Beam: 69 ft 6 in (21.18 m)
- Draught: 26 ft (7.9 m)
- Propulsion: Steam turbines, 1 shaft, 8,500 shp (6.3 MW)
- Speed: 18 knots (33 km/h)
- Complement: 890 officers and men
- Armament: 2 × 4"/50, 5"/38 or 5"/51 guns; 8 × twin 40 mm Bofors; 35 × single 20 mm Oerlikon
- Aircraft carried: 24

The first USS Estero (CVE-42) (previously AVG-42 then later ACV-42) was an escort aircraft carrier launched 22 March 1943 by the Seattle-Tacoma Shipbuilding Corporation, Seattle, Washington, and sponsored by Mrs. C. N. Ingraham. She was reclassified CVE-42 on 15 July 1943. Completed in October 1943, she was transferred to the Royal Navy on 3 November 1943 and commissioned the same day as HMS Premier.

She served in World War II as an ASW escort carrier in European waters and additionally as a ferry carrier. She was returned to United States custody 2 April 1946, she was stricken on 21 May 1946 and was sold into merchant service as the Rhodesia Star (later renamed Hong Kong Knight) in 1947. She was scrapped in Taiwan in 1974.

== Design and description ==
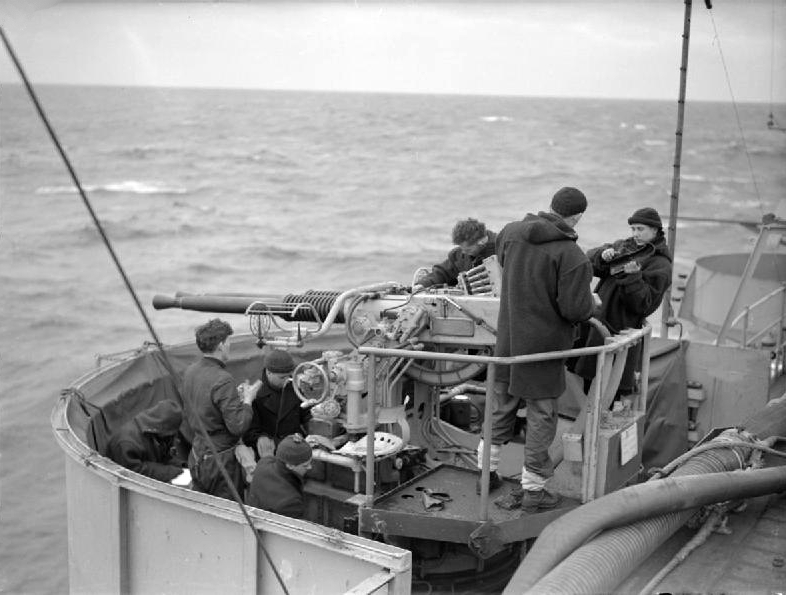
Twin 40 mm Bofors anti-aircraft gun.

These ships were all larger and had a greater aircraft capacity than all the preceding American built escort carriers. They were also all laid down as escort carriers and not converted merchant ships. All the ships had a complement of 646 men and an overall length of 492 feet 3 inches (150.0 m), a beam of 69 feet 6 inches (21.2 m) and a draught of 25 ft 6 in (7.8 m). Propulsion was provided a steam turbine, two boilers connected to one shaft giving 9,350 brake horsepower (SHP), which could propel the ship at 16.5 knots (30.6 km/h; 19.0 mph).

Aircraft facilities were a small combined bridge–flight control on the starboard side, two aircraft lifts 43 feet (13.1 m) by 34 feet (10.4 m), one aircraft catapult and nine arrestor wires. Aircraft could be housed in the 260 feet (79.2 m) by 62 feet (18.9 m) hangar below the flight deck. Armament comprised: two 4"/50, 5"/38 or 5"/51 Dual Purpose guns in single mounts, sixteen 40 mm Bofors anti-aircraft guns in twin mounts and twenty 20 mm Oerlikon anti-aircraft cannons in single mounts. They had a maximum aircraft capacity of twenty-four aircraft which could be a mixture of Grumman Martlet, Vought F4U Corsair or Hawker Sea Hurricane fighter aircraft and Fairey Swordfish or Grumman Avenger anti-submarine aircraft.
