= List of United States Navy ships =

Ships of the United States Navy

Ships in current service
- Current ships

Ships grouped alphabetically
- A–B; C; D–F; G–H; I–K; L; M; N–O; P; Q–R; S; T–V; W–Z

Ships grouped by type
- Aircraft carriers; Airships; Amphibious warfare ships; Auxiliaries; Battlecruisers; Battleships; Cruisers; Destroyers; Destroyer escorts; Destroyer leaders; Escort carriers; Frigates; Hospital ships; Littoral combat ships; Mine warfare vessels; Monitors; Oilers; Patrol vessels; Registered civilian vessels; Sailing frigates; Steam frigates; Steam gunboats; Ships of the line; Sloops of war; Submarines; Torpedo boats; Torpedo retrievers; Unclassified miscellaneous; Yard and district craft

List of United States Navy ships is a comprehensive listing of all ships that have been in service to the United States Navy during the history of that service. The US Navy maintains its official list of ships past and present at the Naval Vessel Register (NVR), although it does not include early vessels. The NVR US Navy Inactive Classification Symbols is a concise list of inactive definitions. The Dictionary of American Naval Fighting Ships includes much detail on historical ships, and was used as the basis for many of Wikipedia's ship articles.

Due to the large number of entries, this list has been divided into the lists to be found in the infobox:

- Ships in current service
- Ships grouped alphabetically by the first letter of the ship's name
- Ships grouped by type

== See also ==
- List of U.S. military vessels named after living Americans
- List of U.S. military vessels named after women
- List of United States Navy ships named after U.S. states
- List of Sunken United States Navy Ships
- List of United States Navy losses in World War II - abbreviated list
- List of U.S. Navy ships sunk or damaged in action during World War II - detailed list
- List of ships of the United States Army
- List of ships of the United States Air Force
- List of ships of the United States Coast Guard
- List of museum ships of the United States military
- History of the United States Navy
- Hull classification symbol
- The Official Register, a government publication which maintained a list of US Navy ships in the 19th century
- List of US Navy Ships commissioned in 2025
