= List of U.S. Navy ships commissioned in 2025 =

The U.S. Navy has commissioned two vessels in 2025. The U.S. Navy has commissioned one attack submarine and one littoral combat ship.

| Ship | Photo | Type | Class | Serial number | Commission Date | Homeport | Notes |
|---|---|---|---|---|---|---|---|
| USS Iowa | USS Iowa (SSN-797) delivery | Attack Submarine | Virginia | SSN-797 | April 5, 2025 | Groton, CT | |
| USS Pierre | USS Pierre (LCS-38) arrives in Panama City, Florida | Littoral Combat Ship | Independence | LCS-38 | November 16, 2025 | San Diego, CA | |
