= United States Navy =

Maritime service branch of the U.S. military

- Emblem of the United States Navy
- Founded: March 27, 1794; 232 years ago (in current form) October 13, 1775; 251 years ago (as the Continental Navy)
- Country: United States
- Type: Navy
- Role: Naval warfare
- Size: 344,600 active personnel; 57,500 reserve personnel; 210,024 civilian employees (As of 2025); 480 ships total, of which 300 are deployable (As of 2019); 2,623 aircraft (As of 2018)
- Part of: United States Armed Forces; Department of the Navy
- Headquarters: The Pentagon; Arlington County, Virginia, U.S.
- Mottos: Semper Fortis ('Always Courageous'), (unofficial). Non sibi sed patriae ('Not for self but for country') (unofficial)
- Colors: Blue and gold
- March: "Anchors Aweigh"
- Anniversaries: 13 October
- Equipment: List of equipment of the United States Navy
- Engagements: See list: American Revolutionary War American–Algerian War (1785–1795) Quasi-War First Barbary War War of 1812 Second Barbary War West Indies Anti-Piracy Operations Seminole Wars African Anti-Slavery Operations Aegean Sea Anti-Piracy Operations First Sumatran expedition United States exploration expedition Patriot War Second Sumatran expedition Ivory Coast Expedition Capture of Monterey Mexican–American War Bombardment of Greytown Battle of Ty-ho Bay First Fiji Expedition Filibuster War Second Opium War Third Fiji expedition Reform War Paraguay expedition American Civil War Bombardment of Qui Nhon Shimonoseki Campaign Formosa Expedition United States expedition to Korea Egyptian Expedition (1882) Bering Sea Anti-Poaching Operations Kingdom of Hawaii overthrowal Second Samoan Civil War Banana Wars; Spanish–American War; Negro Rebellion; Occupation of Nicaragua; Occupation of Haiti; Occupation of the Dominican Republic (1916) Philippine–American War Boxer Rebellion World War I Bombardment of Samsun World War II Korean War First Taiwan Strait Crisis 1958 Lebanon crisis 1958 Taiwan Strait Crisis Vietnam War Occupation of the Dominican Republic (1965) Iranian Hostage Rescue Gulf of Sidra incident (1981) Multinational Force in Lebanon Invasion of Grenada Action in the Gulf of Sidra (1986) Bombing of Libya (1986) Tanker War; Earnest Will; Prime Chance; Eager Glacier; Nimble Archer; Praying Mantis 1989 air battle near Tobruk Invasion of Panama Gulf War Iraqi no-fly zones Somali Civil War; Operation Restore Hope; American military intervention in Somalia (2007–present); Somali Civil War (2009–present); Islamic State insurgency in Puntland Bosnian War Third Taiwan Strait Crisis Kosovo War International Force for East Timor Operation Enduring Freedom; Afghanistan (2001–2014); Philippines; Horn of Africa; Trans Sahara; Caribbean and Central America Iraq War Operation Burnt Frost Operation Ocean Shield Operation Odyssey Dawn 2014 Intervention against ISIL Operation Inherent Resolve War in Afghanistan (2015–2021) 2017 Shayrat missile strike Operation Prosperity Guardian 2024 missile strikes in Yemen Twelve-Day War; Operation Midnight Hammer 2026 Iran War; 2026 United States naval blockade of Iran
- Website: navy.mil

Commanders
- Commander-in-Chief: President Donald Trump
- Secretary of Defense: Pete Hegseth
- Secretary of the Navy: Hung Cao (acting)
- Chief of Naval Operations: ADM Daryl Caudle
- Vice Chief of Naval Operations: ADM James Kilby
- Master Chief Petty Officer of the Navy: MCPON John J. Perryman IV

Insignia
- Flag

- Ensign

- Union Jack

- Pennant

- Logo

Ships of the United States Navy

Ships in current service
- Current ships

Ships grouped alphabetically
- A–B; C; D–F; G–H; I–K; L; M; N–O; P; Q–R; S; T–V; W–Z

Ships grouped by type
- Aircraft carriers; Airships; Amphibious warfare ships; Auxiliaries; Battlecruisers; Battleships; Cruisers; Destroyers; Destroyer escorts; Destroyer leaders; Escort carriers; Frigates; Hospital ships; Littoral combat ships; Mine warfare vessels; Monitors; Oilers; Patrol vessels; Registered civilian vessels; Sailing frigates; Steam frigates; Steam gunboats; Ships of the line; Sloops of war; Submarines; Torpedo boats; Torpedo retrievers; Unclassified miscellaneous; Yard and district craft

The United States Navy (USN) is the maritime service branch of the United States Armed Forces and is designated as the navy of the United States in the Constitution. With 290 combat vessels, it is the world's second largest navy, behind the People's Liberation Army Navy, and by far the largest by displacement, at 4.5 million tons in 2021. It has the world's largest aircraft carrier fleet, with eleven in service, one undergoing trials, two new carriers under construction, and six other carriers planned as of 2024. The Navy is a part of the Department of Defense and is one of six armed forces and eight uniformed services of the United States.

The Navy originates from the Continental Navy, established in the American Revolutionary War. The Naval Act of 1794 provided for constructing six heavy frigates, the first ships of the Navy, in the prelude to the Barbary Wars. The American Civil War saw the blockade of the Confederacy and seizing control of its rivers. In World War II, the Navy was central in defeating the Imperial Japanese Navy in the Pacific War and Kriegsmarine U-boats in the Battle of the Atlantic, supplanting the Royal Navy as the world's largest navy. During the Cold War, the Navy, rivalled by the Soviet Navy, began providing nuclear deterrence via its ballistic missile submarines. The Navy was a major participant in the Korean and Vietnam Wars, and later the Gulf War, Yugoslav Wars and war on terror. A global power projecting blue-water navy, current large deployments include the Western Pacific, the Mediterranean, and the Indian Ocean, and it is able to rapidly respond to regional crises, making it a frequent actor in US foreign and military policy.

The Navy is part of the Department of the Navy, alongside the coequal United States Marine Corps, and is headed by the secretary of the Navy. The chief of naval operations (CNO) is the most senior Navy officer serving in the Department of the Navy. With 336,978 personnel on active duty and 101,583 in the Ready Reserve, the Navy is the third largest of US military service branches. The Navy maintains 290 deployable combat vessels as of 2023, including the world's largest fleet of nuclear-powered ships, between 11 aircraft carriers and 70 submarines. The world's largest naval aviation force with 4,012 operational aircraft, combat fleets include 471 F/A-18E/F Super Hornets and 458 Sikorsky MH-60 Seahawk helicopters. The Navy operates the Ohio-class submarines, which are assigned 1,895 nuclear warheads, representing 51% of the US nuclear stockpile and 19% of the global nuclear stockpile.

== Mission ==
To recruit, train, equip, and organize to deliver combat ready Naval forces to win conflicts and wars while maintaining security and deterrence through sustained forward presence.

— Mission statement of the United States Navy.

The Navy's three primary areas of responsibility are:

- The preparation of naval forces necessary for the effective prosecution of war.
- The maintenance of naval aviation, including land-based naval aviation, air transport essential for naval operations, and all air weapons and air techniques involved in the operations and activities of the Navy.
- The development of aircraft, weapons, military tactics, technique, organization, and equipment of naval combat and service elements.

U.S. Navy training manuals state that the overall mission of the armed forces is "to be prepared to conduct prompt and sustained combat operations in support of the national interest." The Navy's five enduring functions are: sea control, power projection, deterrence, maritime security, and sealift.

== History ==
=== Origins ===
It follows then as certain as that night succeeds the day, that without a decisive naval force we can do nothing definitive, and with it, everything honorable and glorious.

— George Washington 15 November 1781, to Marquis de Lafayette

Would to Heaven we had a navy able to reform those enemies to mankind or crush them into non-existence.

— George Washington 15 August 1786, to Marquis de Lafayette

Naval power . . . is the natural defense of the United States.

— John Adams

The Navy was rooted in the colonial seafaring tradition, which produced a large community of sailors, captains, and shipbuilders. In the early stages of the American Revolutionary War, Massachusetts had its own Massachusetts Naval Militia. The rationale for establishing a national navy was debated in the Second Continental Congress. Supporters argued that a navy would protect shipping, defend the coast, and make it easier to seek support from foreign countries. Detractors countered that challenging the British Royal Navy, then the world's preeminent naval power, was a foolish undertaking. Commander in Chief George Washington resolved the debate when he commissioned the ocean-going schooner USS Hannah to interdict British merchantmen and reported the captures to the Congress. On 13 October 1775, the Continental Congress authorized the purchase of two vessels to be armed for a cruise against British merchantmen; this resolution created the Continental Navy and is considered the first establishment of the U.S. Navy. The Continental Navy achieved mixed results; it was successful in a number of engagements and raided many British merchant vessels, but it lost twenty-four of its vessels and at one point was reduced to two in active service. In August 1785, after the Revolutionary War had drawn to a close, Congress had sold Alliance, the last ship remaining in the Continental Navy due to a lack of funds to maintain the ship or support a navy.

In 1972, the chief of naval operations, Admiral Elmo Zumwalt, authorized the Navy to celebrate its birthday on 13 October to honor the establishment of the Continental Navy in 1775.

=== From re-establishment to the Civil War ===
The United States was without a navy for nearly a decade, a situation that exposed U.S. merchant ships to attacks by the Barbary pirates. The sole armed maritime presence between 1790 and the launching of the U.S. Navy's first warships in 1797 was the U.S. Revenue-Marine, the primary predecessor of the U.S. Coast Guard. Although the United States Revenue Cutter Service conducted operations against the pirates, the pirates' depredations far outstripped its abilities and Congress passed the Naval Act of 1794 that established a permanent standing navy on 27 March 1794. The Naval Act ordered the construction and manning of six frigates and, by October 1797, the first three were brought into service: USS United States, USS Constellation, and USS Constitution. Due to his strong posture on having a strong standing Navy during this period, John Adams is "often called the father of the American Navy". In 1798–99 the Navy was involved in an undeclared Quasi-War with France. From 1801 to 1805, in the First Barbary War, the U.S. Navy defended U.S. ships from the Barbary pirates, blockaded the Barbary ports and executed attacks against the Barbary' fleets.

The U.S. Navy saw substantial action in the War of 1812, where it fought numerous engagements with Royal Navy. It emerged victorious in the Battle of Lake Erie and prevented the region from becoming a threat to American operations in the area. The result was a major victory for the U.S. Army at the Niagara Frontier of the war, and the defeat of Tecumseh's confederacy at the Battle of the Thames. Despite this, the U.S. Navy could not prevent the British from blockading its ports and landing troops. But after the War of 1812 ended in 1815, the U.S. Navy primarily focused its attention on protecting American shipping assets, sending squadrons to the Caribbean, the Mediterranean, where it participated in the Second Barbary War that ended piracy in the region, South America, Africa, and the Pacific. From 1819 to the outbreak of the Civil War, the Africa Squadron operated to suppress the slave trade, seizing 36 slave ships, although its contribution was smaller than that of the much larger Royal Navy. After 1840 several secretaries of the navy were southerners who advocated for strengthening southern naval defenses, expanding the fleet, and making naval technological improvements.

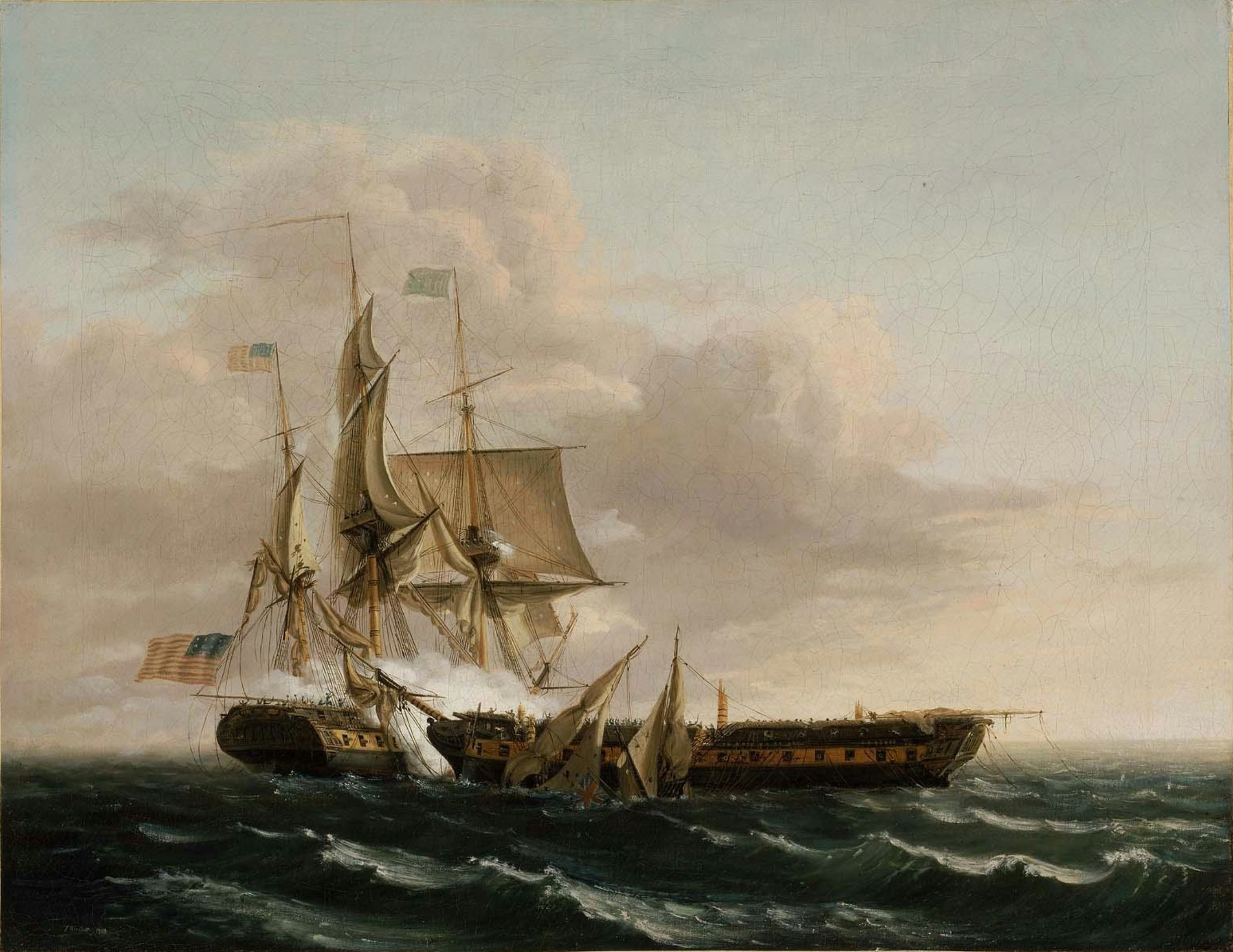
USS Constitution vs HMS Guerriere during the War of 1812

During the Mexican–American War the U.S. Navy blockaded Mexican ports, capturing or burning the Mexican fleet in the Gulf of California and capturing all major cities in Baja California peninsula. In 1846–1848 the Navy successfully used the Pacific Squadron under Commodore Robert F. Stockton and its marines and blue-jackets to facilitate the capture of California with large-scale land operations coordinated with the local militia organized in the California Battalion. The Navy conducted the U.S. military's first large-scale amphibious joint operation by successfully landing 12,000 army troops with their equipment in one day at Veracruz, Mexico. When larger guns were needed to bombard Veracruz, Navy volunteers landed large guns and manned them in the successful bombardment and capture of the city. This successful landing and capture of Veracruz opened the way for the capture of Mexico City and the end of the war. The U.S. Navy established itself as a player in United States foreign policy through the actions of Commodore Matthew C. Perry in Japan, which resulted in the Convention of Kanagawa in 1854.

Naval power played a significant role during the American Civil War, in which the Union had a distinct advantage over the Confederacy on the seas. A Union blockade on all major ports shut down exports and the coastal trade, but blockade runners provided a thin lifeline. The Brown-water navy components of the U.S. navy control of the river systems made internal travel difficult for Confederates and easy for the Union. The war saw ironclad warships in combat for the first time at the Battle of Hampton Roads in 1862, which pitted USS Monitor against CSS Virginia. For two decades after the war, however, the U.S. Navy's fleet was neglected and became technologically obsolete.

=== 20th century ===
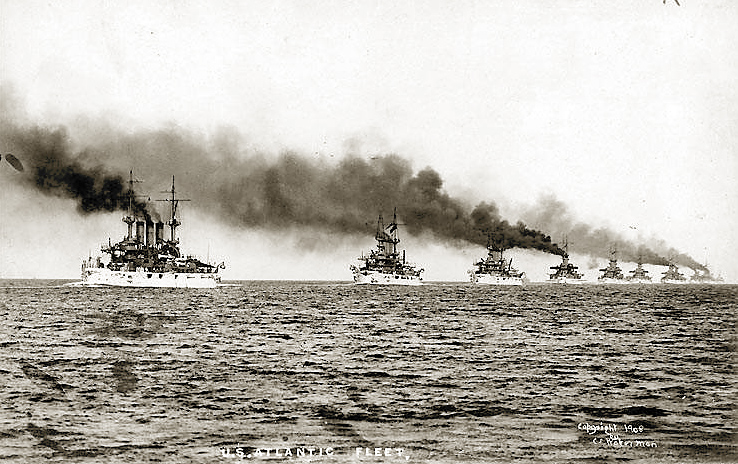
The Great White Fleet demonstrating U.S. naval power in 1907; it was proof that the U.S. Navy had blue-water capability.

A modernization program beginning in the 1880s when the first steel-hulled warships stimulated the American steel industry, and "the new steel navy" was born. This rapid expansion of the U.S. Navy and its decisive victory over the outdated Spanish Navy in 1898 brought a new respect for American technical quality. Rapid building of at first pre-dreadnoughts, then dreadnoughts brought the U.S. in line with the navies of countries such as Britain and Germany. In 1907, most of the Navy's battleships, with several support vessels, dubbed the Great White Fleet, were showcased in a 14-month circumnavigation of the world. Ordered by President Theodore Roosevelt, it was a mission designed to demonstrate the Navy's capability to extend to the global theater. By 1911, the U.S. had begun building the super-dreadnoughts at a pace to eventually become competitive with Britain. 1911 also saw the first naval aircraft with the navy which would lead to the informal establishment of United States Naval Flying Corps to protect shore bases. It was not until 1921 US naval aviation truly commenced.

==== World War I and interwar years ====
During World War I, the U.S. Navy spent much of its resources protecting and shipping hundreds of thousands of soldiers and marines of the American Expeditionary Force and war supplies across the Atlantic in U-boat infested waters with the Cruiser and Transport Force. It also concentrated on laying the North Sea Mine Barrage. Hesitation by the senior command meant that naval forces were not contributed until late 1917. Battleship Division Nine was dispatched to Britain and served as the Sixth Battle Squadron of the British Grand Fleet. Its presence allowed the British to decommission some older ships and reuse the crews on smaller vessels. Destroyers and U.S. Naval Air Force units like the Northern Bombing Group contributed to the anti-submarine operations. The strength of the United States Navy grew under an ambitious ship building program associated with the Naval Act of 1916.

Naval construction, especially of battleships, was limited by the Washington Naval Conference of 1921–22, the first arms control conference in history. The aircraft carriers USS Saratoga (CV-3) and USS Lexington (CV-2) were built on the hulls of partially built battle cruisers that had been canceled by the treaty. The New Deal used Public Works Administration funds to build warships, such as USS Yorktown (CV-5) and USS Enterprise (CV-6). By 1936, with the completion of USS Wasp (CV-7), the U.S. Navy possessed a carrier fleet of 165,000 tonnes displacement, although this figure was nominally recorded as 135,000 tonnes to comply with treaty limitations. Franklin Roosevelt, the number two official in the Navy Department during World War I, appreciated the Navy and gave it strong support. In return, senior leaders were eager for innovation and experimented with new technologies, such as magnetic torpedoes, and developed a strategy called War Plan Orange for victory in the Pacific in a hypothetical war with Japan that would eventually become reality.

==== World War II ====
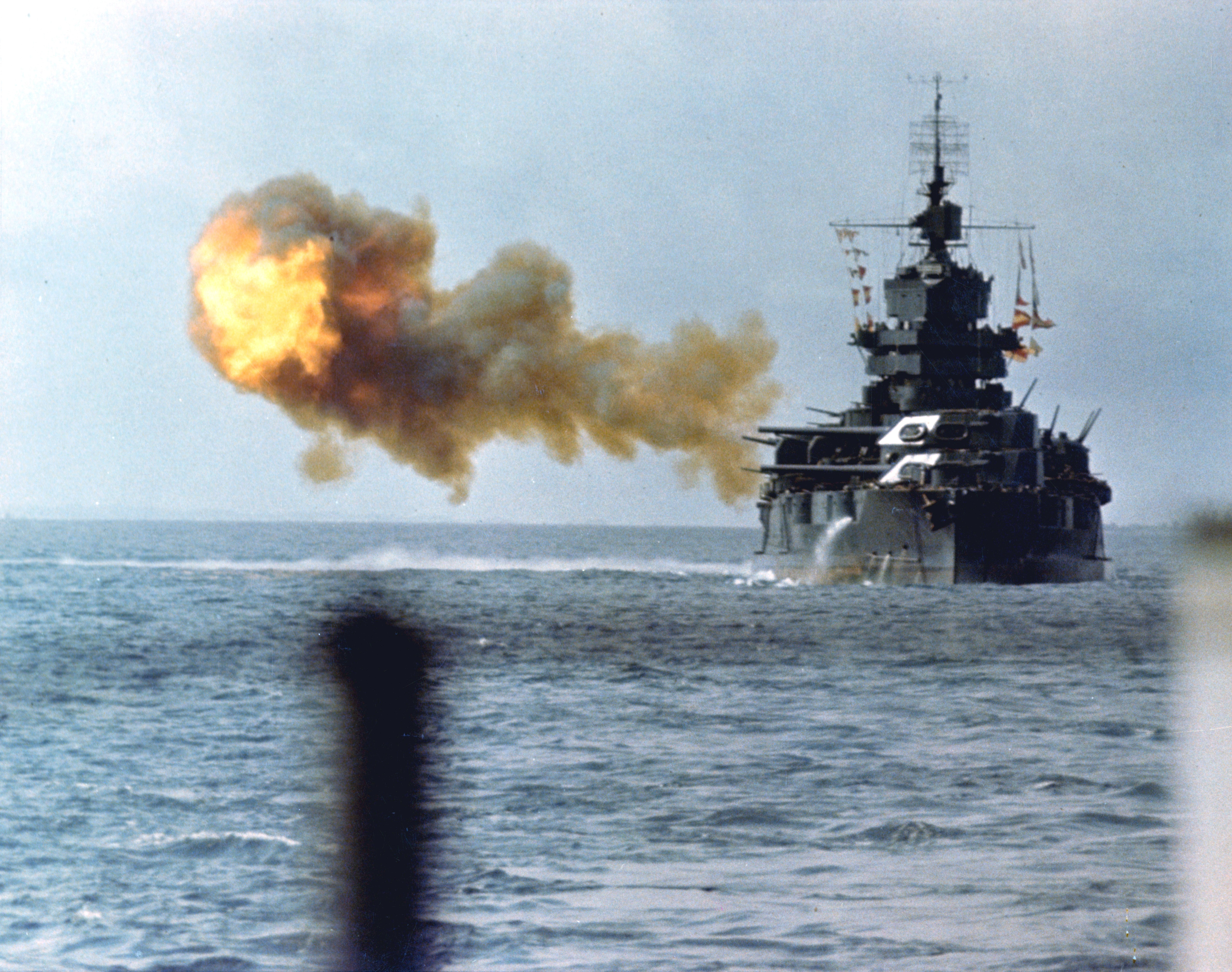
Battleship USS Idaho shelling Okinawa on 1 April 1945

The U.S. Navy grew into a formidable force in the years prior to World War II, with battleship production being restarted in 1937, commencing with USS North Carolina (BB-55). Though ultimately unsuccessful, Japan tried to neutralize this strategic threat with the surprise attack on Pearl Harbor on 7 December 1941. Following American entry into the war, the U.S. Navy grew tremendously as the United States was faced with a two-front war on the seas. It achieved notable acclaim in the Pacific Theater, where it was instrumental to the Allies' successful "island hopping" campaign. The U.S. Navy participated in many significant battles, including the Battle of the Coral Sea, the Battle of Midway, the Solomon Islands Campaign, the Battle of the Philippine Sea, the Battle of Leyte Gulf, and the Battle of Okinawa. By 1943, the navy's size was larger than the combined fleets of all the other combatant nations in World War II. By war's end in 1945, the U.S. Navy had added hundreds of new ships, including 18 aircraft carriers and 8 battleships, and had over 70% of the world's total numbers and total tonnage of naval vessels of 1,000 tons or greater. At its peak, the U.S. Navy was operating 6,768 ships on V-J Day in August 1945.

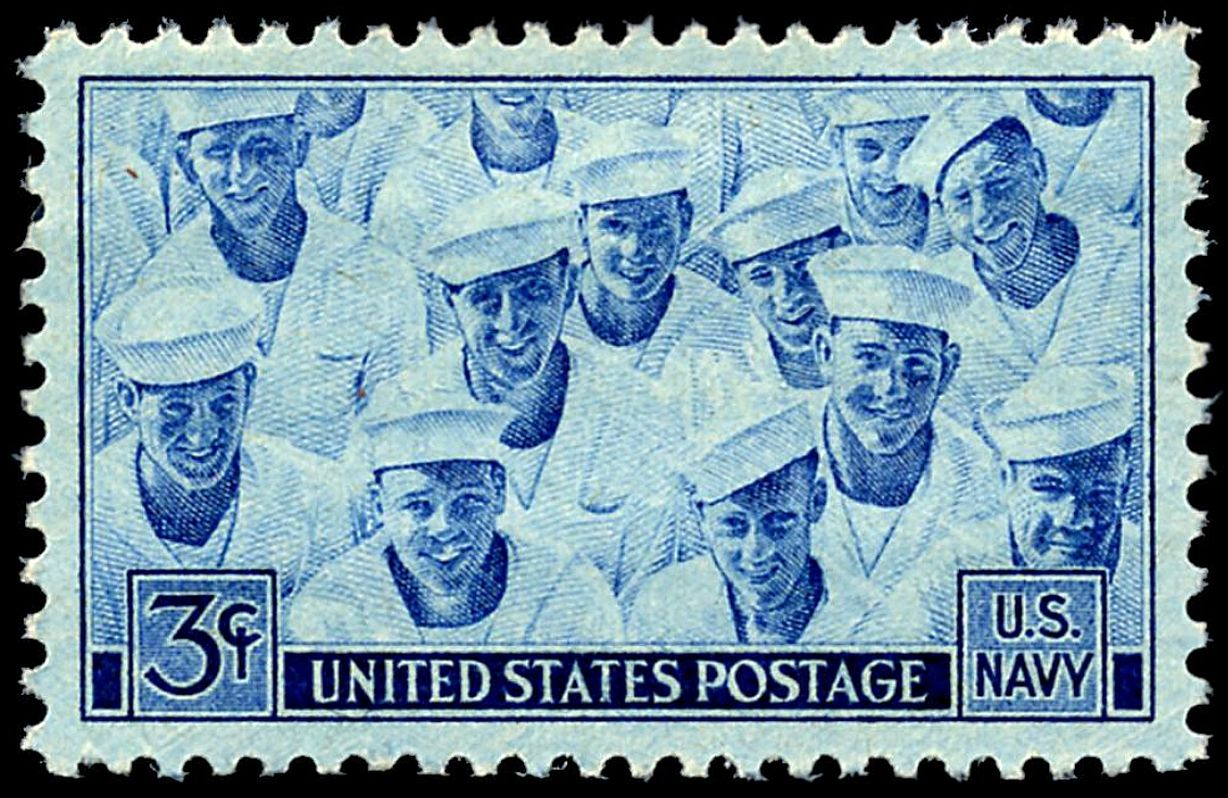
On Navy Day, 27 October 1945, the U.S. Post Office issued a commemorative stamp in honor of the Navy and the end of WW2.

Doctrine had significantly shifted by the end of the war. The U.S. Navy had followed in the footsteps of the navies of Great Britain and Germany which favored concentrated groups of battleships as their main offensive naval weapons. The development of the aircraft carrier and its devastating use by the Japanese against the U.S. at Pearl Harbor, however, shifted U.S. thinking. The Pearl Harbor attack destroyed or took out of action a significant number of U.S. Navy battleships. This placed much of the burden of retaliating against the Japanese on the small number of aircraft carriers. During World War II some 4,000,000 Americans served in the United States Navy.

==== Cold War and 1990s ====
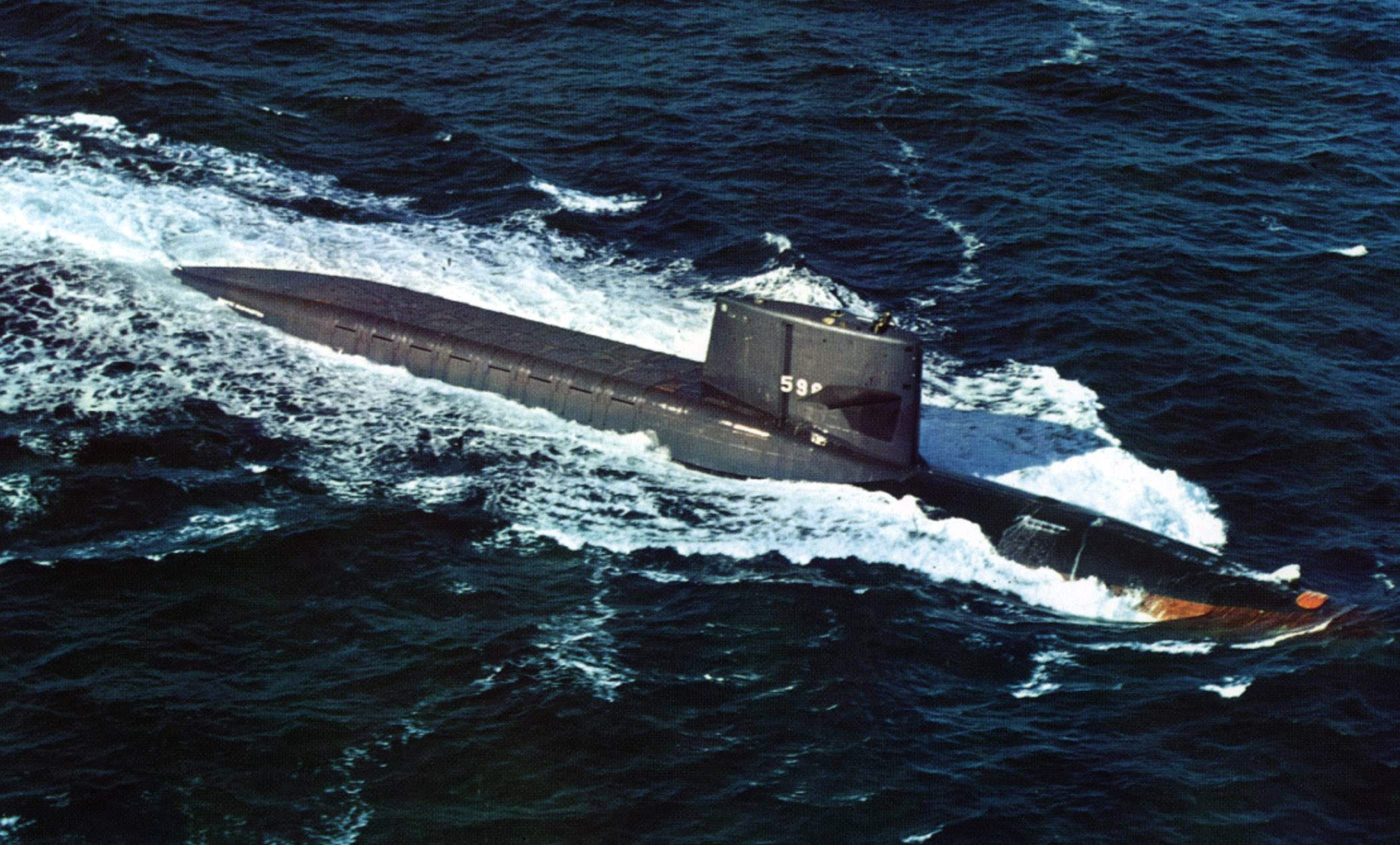
USS George Washington, a ballistic missile submarine

The potential for armed conflict with the Soviet Union during the Cold War pushed the U.S. Navy to continue its technological advancement by developing new weapons systems, ships, and aircraft. U.S. naval strategy changed to that of forward deployment in support of U.S. allies with an emphasis on carrier battle groups.

The navy was a major participant in the Korean and Vietnam Wars, blockaded Cuba during the Cuban Missile Crisis, and, through the use of ballistic missile submarines, became an important aspect of the United States' nuclear strategic deterrence policy. The U.S. Navy conducted various combat operations in the Persian Gulf against Iran in 1987 and 1988, most notably Operation Praying Mantis. The Navy was extensively involved in Operation Urgent Fury, Operation Desert Shield, Operation Desert Storm, Operation Deliberate Force, Operation Allied Force, Operation Desert Fox and Operation Southern Watch.

The U.S. Navy has also been involved in search and rescue/search and salvage operations, sometimes in conjunction with vessels of other countries as well as with U.S. Coast Guard ships. Two examples are the 1966 Palomares B-52 crash incident and the subsequent search for missing hydrogen bombs, and Task Force 71 of the Seventh Fleet's operation in search for Korean Air Lines Flight 007, shot down by the Soviets on 1 September 1983.

=== 21st century ===
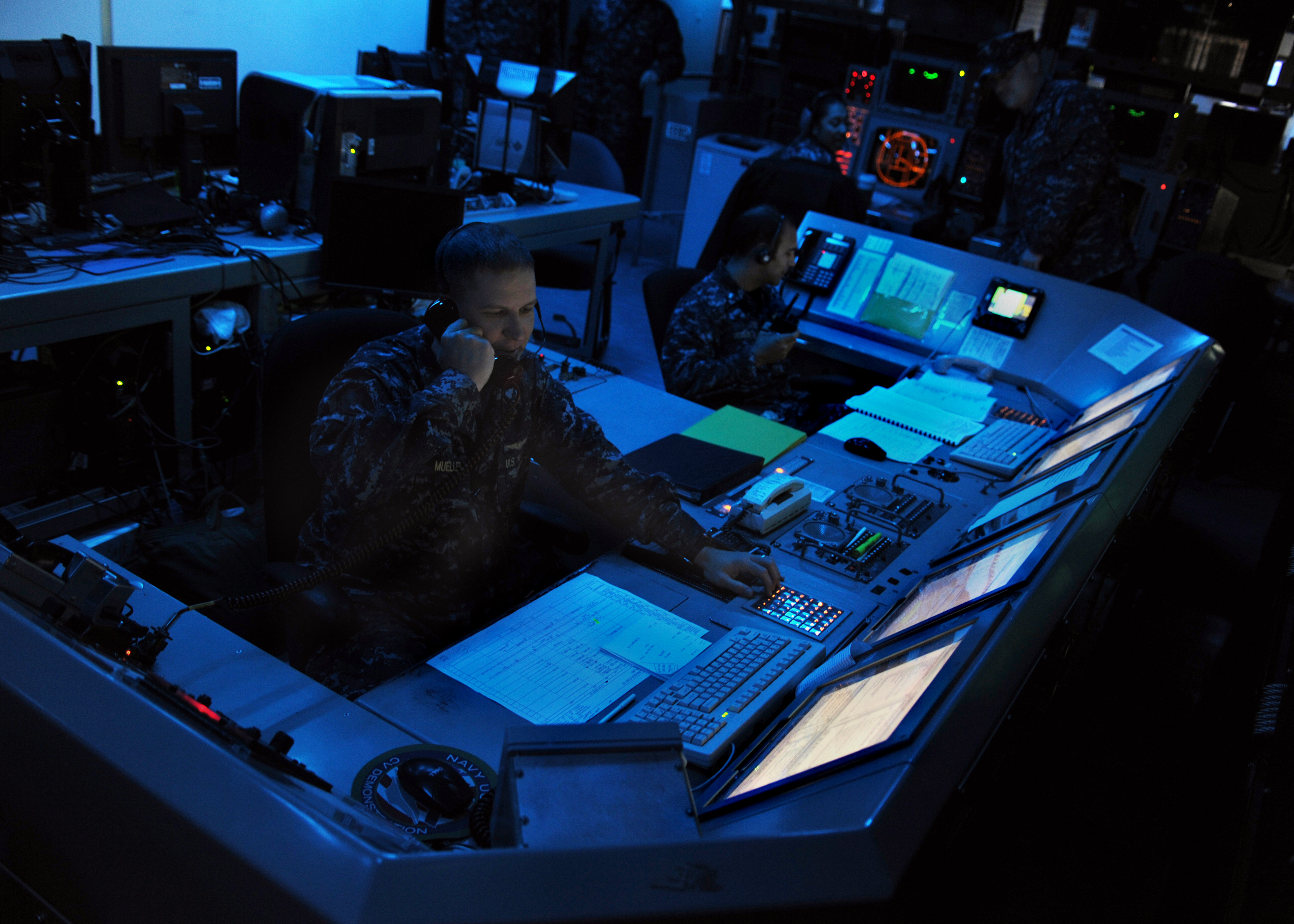
U.S. Navy officers aboard the aircraft carrier USS Abraham Lincoln monitor defense systems during early 2010s maritime security operations exercises.

The U.S. Navy continues to be a major support for U.S. interests in the 21st century. Since the end of the Cold War, it has shifted its focus from preparations for large-scale war with the Soviet Union to special operations and strike missions in regional conflicts. The navy participated in Operation Enduring Freedom, Operation Iraqi Freedom, and is a major participant in the ongoing war on terror, largely in this capacity. Development continues on new ships and weapons, including the Gerald R. Ford-class aircraft carrier and the Littoral combat ship. Because of its size, weapons technology, and ability to project force far from U.S. shores, the current U.S. Navy remains an asset for the United States. Moreover, it is the principal means through which the U.S. maintains global order, namely by safeguarding global trade and protecting allied nations.

In 2007, the U.S. Navy joined with the U.S. Marine Corps and U.S. Coast Guard to adopt a new maritime strategy called A Cooperative Strategy for 21st Century Seapower that raises the notion of prevention of war to the same philosophical level as the conduct of war. The strategy was presented by the Chief of Naval Operations, the Commandant of the Marine Corps, and Commandant of the Coast Guard at the International Sea Power Symposium in Newport, Rhode Island on 17 October 2007.

The strategy recognized the economic links of the global system and how any disruption due to regional crises (man-made or natural) can adversely impact the U.S. economy and quality of life. This new strategy charts a course for the Navy, Coast Guard, and Marine Corps to work collectively with each other and international partners to prevent these crises from occurring or reacting quickly should one occur to prevent negative impacts on the U.S.

In 2010, Admiral Gary Roughead, Chief of Naval Operations, noted that demands on the Navy have grown as the fleet has shrunk and that in the face of future budget declines, the U.S. Navy must rely even more on international partnerships.

In its 2013 budget request, the navy focused on retaining all eleven big deck carriers, at the expense of cutting numbers of smaller ships and delaying the SSBN replacement. By the next year the USN found itself unable to maintain eleven aircraft carriers in the face of the expiration of budget relief offered by the Bipartisan Budget Act of 2013 and CNO Jonathan Greenert said that a ten-ship carrier fleet would not be able to sustainably support military requirements. The British First Sea Lord George Zambellas said that the USN had switched from "outcome-led to resource-led" planning.

One significant change in U.S. policymaking that is having a major effect on naval planning is the Pivot to East Asia. In response, the Secretary of the Navy Ray Mabus stated in 2015 that 60 percent of the total U.S. fleet will be deployed to the Pacific by 2020. The Navy's most recent 30-year shipbuilding plan, published in 2016, calls for a future fleet of 350 ships to meet the challenges of an increasingly competitive international environment. A provision of the 2018 National Defense Authorization Act called for expanding the naval fleet to 355 ships "as soon as practicable", but did not establish additional funding nor a timeline.

== Organization ==
Organization of the United States Navy within the Department of Defense

The U.S. Navy falls under the administration of the Department of the Navy, under civilian leadership of the Secretary of the Navy (SECNAV). The most senior naval officer is the Chief of Naval Operations (CNO), a four-star admiral who is immediately under and reports to the Secretary of the Navy. At the same time, the Chief of Naval Operations is a member of the Joint Chiefs of Staff (JCS), though the JCS plays only an advisory role to the President and does not nominally form part of the chain of command. The Secretary of the Navy and Chief of Naval Operations are responsible for organizing, recruiting, training, and equipping the Navy so that it is ready for operation under the commanders of the unified combatant commands.

=== Operating forces ===
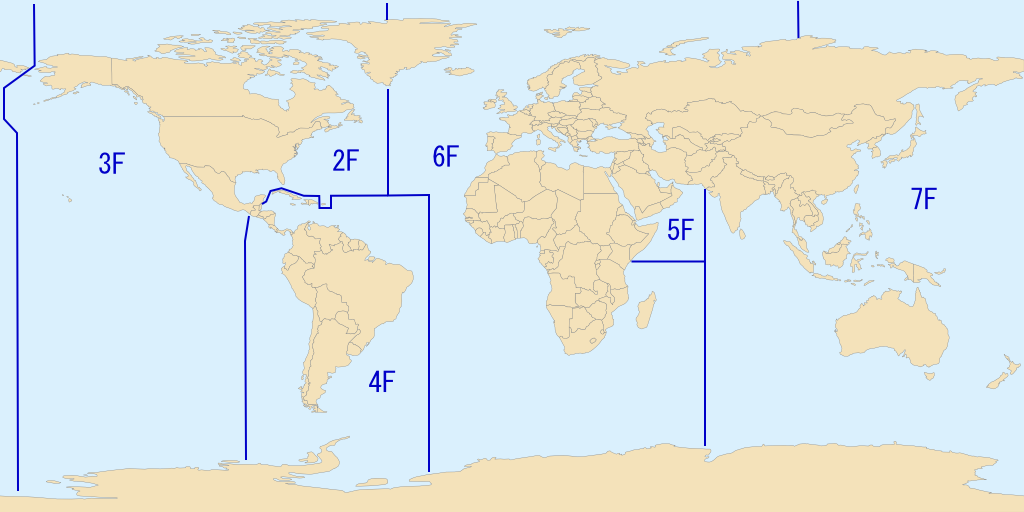
Areas of responsibility for each of the United States Navy fleets. Tenth Fleet serves as the numbered fleet for U.S. Fleet Cyber Command and therefore is not shown.

There are ten components in the operating forces of the U.S. Navy:

- The United States Fleet Forces Command
- The United States Pacific Fleet
- The United States Naval Forces Central Command
- The United States Naval Forces Europe and Africa
- The United States Naval Forces Southern Command
- The Naval Network Warfare Command
- The Navy Reserve
- The United States Naval Special Warfare Command
- The Operational Test and Evaluation Force
- The Military Sealift Command

Fleet Forces Command controls a number of unique capabilities, including the Naval Expeditionary Combat Command and the Naval Information Forces.

The United States Navy has seven active numbered fleets – Second, Third, Fifth, Sixth, Seventh and Tenth Fleets are each led by a vice admiral, and the Fourth Fleet is led by a rear admiral. These seven fleets are further grouped under Fleet Forces Command (the former Atlantic Fleet), Pacific Fleet, Naval Forces Europe-Africa, and Naval Forces Central Command, whose commander also doubles as Commander Fifth Fleet; the first three commands being led by four-star admirals. The United States First Fleet existed after World War II from 1947, but it was redesignated the Third Fleet in early 1973. The Second Fleet was deactivated in September 2011 but reestablished in August 2018 amid heightened tensions with Russia. It is headquartered in Norfolk, Virginia, with responsibility over the East Coast and North Atlantic. In early 2008, the Navy reactivated the Fourth Fleet to control operations in the area controlled by Southern Command, which consists of US assets in and around Central and South America. Other number fleets were activated during World War II and later deactivated, renumbered, or merged.

=== Shore establishments ===
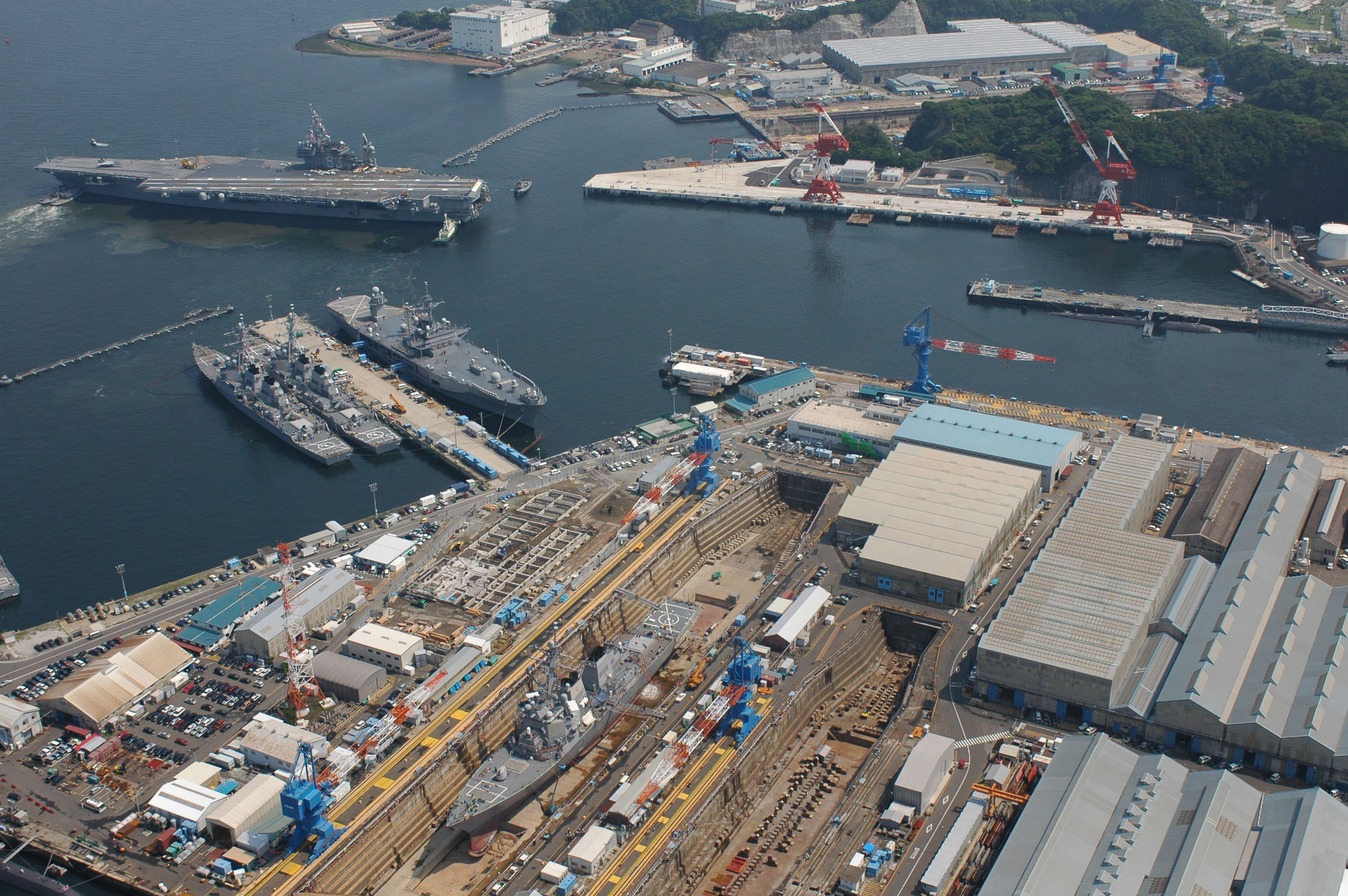
USS Kitty Hawk docking at the U.S. Navy base in Yokosuka, Japan

Shore establishments exist to support the mission of the fleet through the use of facilities on land. Among the commands of the shore establishment, as of April 2011, are the Naval Education and Training Command, the U.S. Fleet Cyber Command, the Navy Space Command, the Navy Installations Command, the Naval Meteorology and Oceanography Command, the Naval Information Warfare Systems Command, the Naval Facilities Engineering Command, the Naval Supply Systems Command, the Naval Air Systems Command, the Naval Sea Systems Command, the Bureau of Medicine and Surgery, the Bureau of Naval Personnel, the Office of Naval Research, the Office of Naval Intelligence, the United States Naval Academy, the Naval Safety Command, the Naval Aviation Warfighting Development Center, and the United States Naval Observatory. Official Navy websites list the Office of the Chief of Naval Operations and the Chief of Naval Operations as part of the shore establishment, but these two entities effectively sit superior to the other organizations, playing a coordinating role.

=== Relationships with other service branches ===
==== United States Marine Corps ====
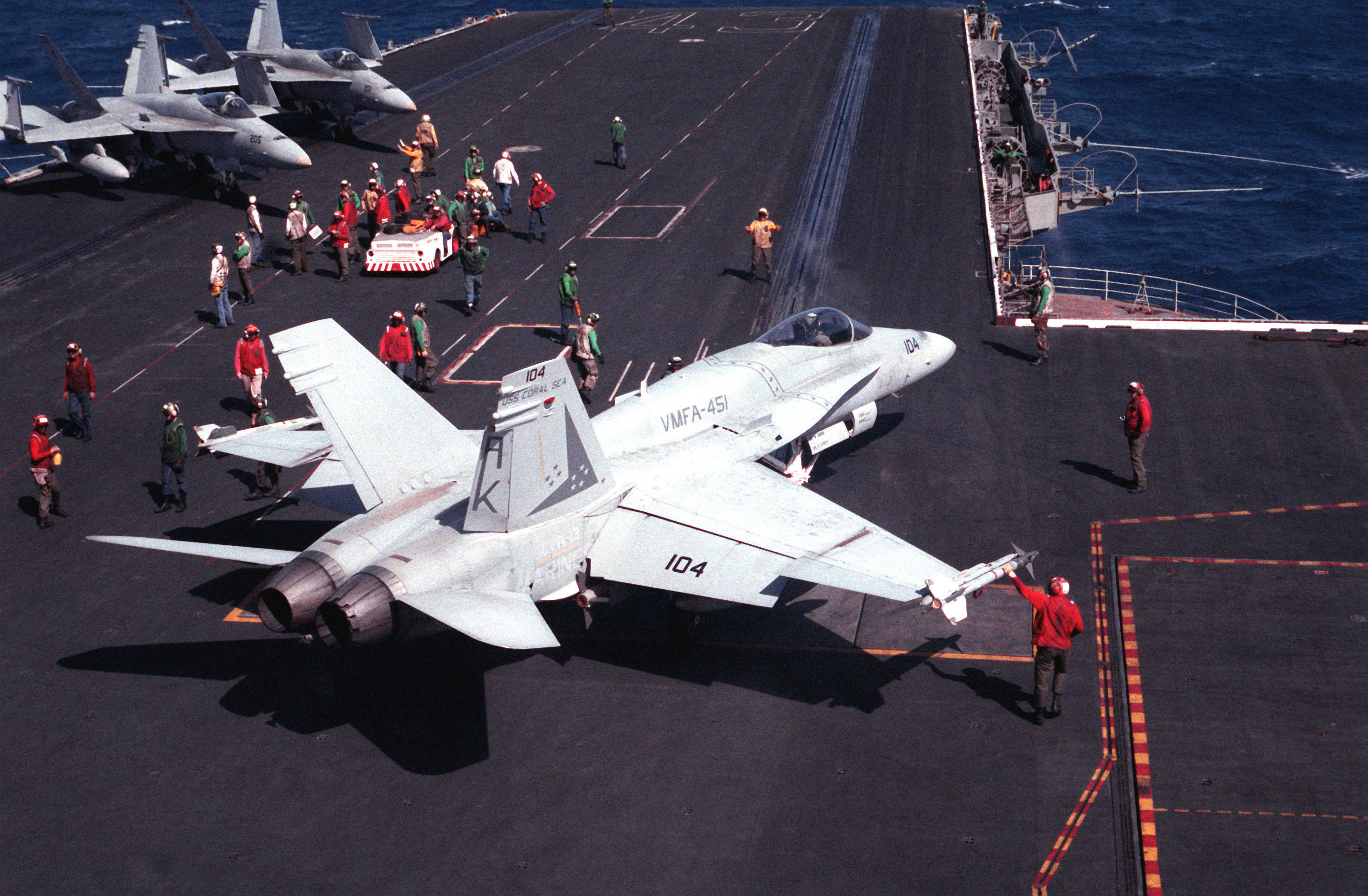
A Marine F/A-18 from VMFA-451 preparing to launch from USS Coral Sea

In 1834, the United States Marine Corps came under the Department of the Navy. Historically, the Navy has had a unique relationship with the USMC, partly because they both specialize in seaborne operations. Together the Navy and Marine Corps form the Department of the Navy and report to the Secretary of the Navy. However, the Marine Corps is a distinct, separate service branch with its own uniformed service chief – the Commandant of the Marine Corps, a four-star general.

The Marine Corps depends on the Navy for medical support (dentists, doctors, nurses, medical technicians known as corpsmen) and religious support (chaplains). Thus, Navy officers and enlisted sailors fulfill these roles. When attached to Marine Corps units deployed to an operational environment they generally wear Marine camouflage uniforms, but otherwise, they wear Navy dress uniforms unless they opt to conform to Marine Corps grooming standards.

In the operational environment, as an expeditionary force specializing in amphibious operations, Marines often embark on Navy ships to conduct operations from beyond territorial waters. Marine units deploying as part of a Marine Air-Ground Task Force (MAGTF) operate under the command of the existing Marine chain of command. Although Marine units routinely operate from amphibious assault ships, the relationship has evolved over the years much as the Commander of the Carrier Air Group/Wing (CAG) does not work for the carrier commanding officer, but coordinates with the ship's CO and staff. Some Marine aviation squadrons, usually fixed-wing assigned to carrier air wings train and operate alongside Navy squadrons; they fly similar missions and often fly sorties together under the cognizance of the CAG. Aviation is where the Navy and Marines share the most common ground since aircrews are guided in their use of aircraft by standard procedures outlined in a series of publications known as NATOPS manuals.

==== United States Coast Guard ====
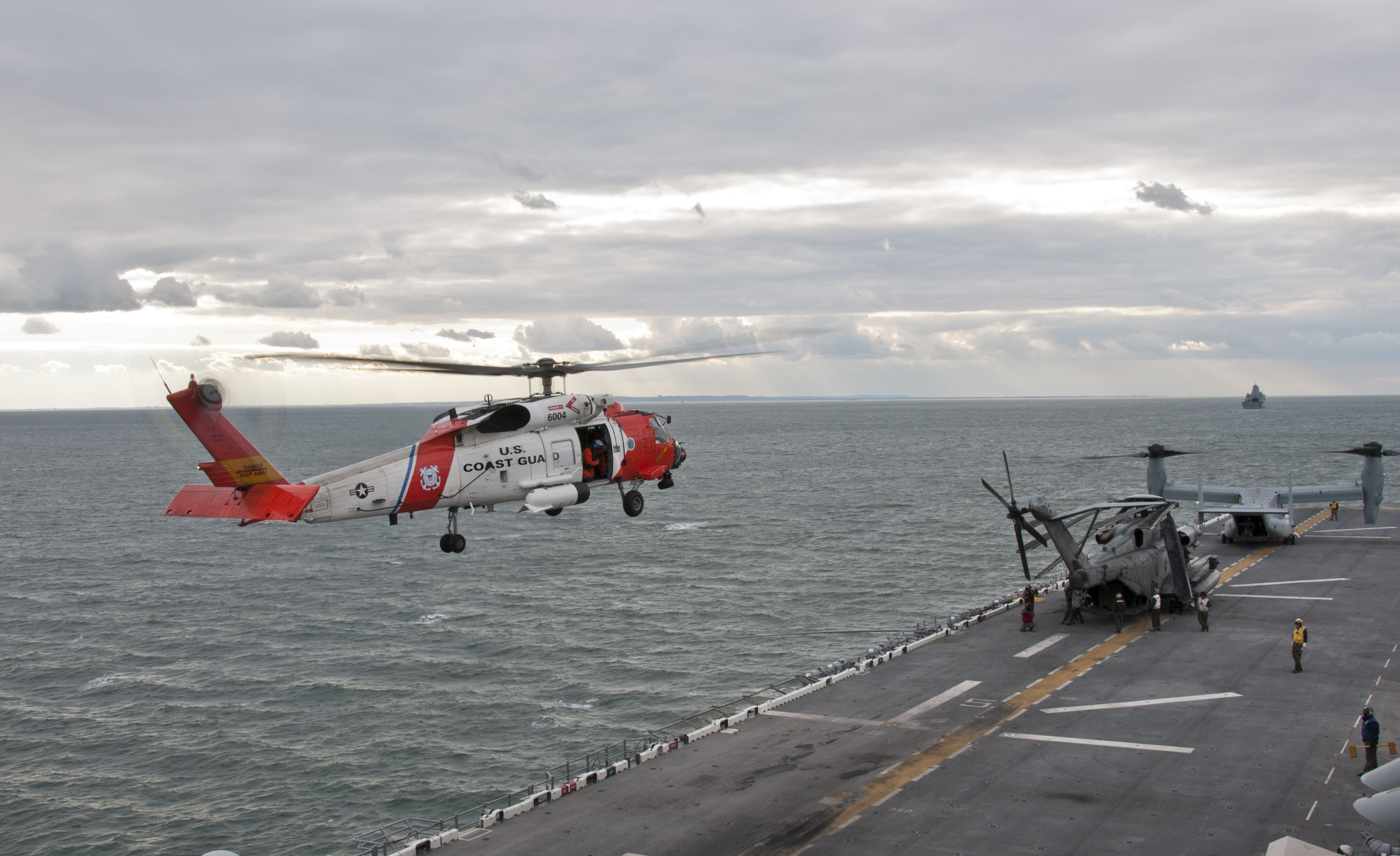
A U.S. Coast Guard helicopter preparing to land on the flight deck of the amphibious assault ship USS Wasp

The United States Coast Guard, in its peacetime role with the Department of Homeland Security, fulfills its law enforcement and rescue role in the maritime environment. It provides Law Enforcement Detachments (LEDETs) to Navy vessels, where they perform arrests and other law enforcement duties during naval boarding and interdiction missions. In times of war, the Coast Guard may be called upon to operate as a service within the Navy. At other times, Coast Guard Port Security Units are sent overseas to guard the security of ports and other assets. The Coast Guard also jointly staffs the Navy's naval coastal warfare groups and squadrons (the latter of which were known as harbor defense commands until late-2004), which oversee defense efforts in foreign littoral combat and inshore areas.

== Personnel ==
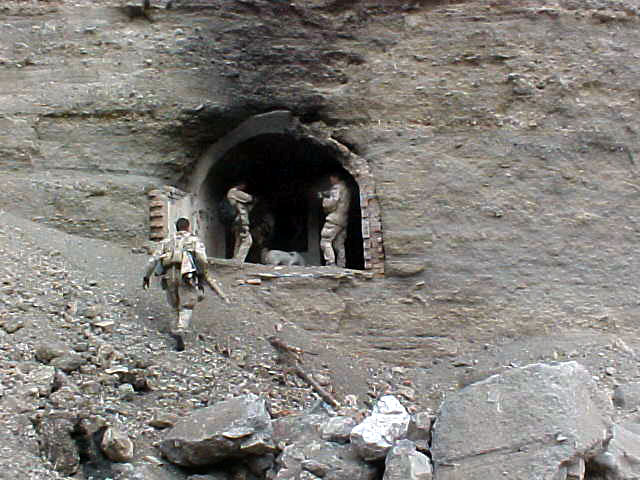
Navy SEALs at one of the entrances to the Zhawar Kili cave complex

The United States Navy has over 400,000 personnel, approximately a quarter of whom are in ready reserve. Of those on active duty, more than eighty percent are enlisted sailors and around fifteen percent are commissioned officers; the rest are midshipmen of the United States Naval Academy and midshipmen of the Naval Reserve Officer Training Corps at over 180 universities around the country and officer candidates at the Navy's Officer Candidate School.

Enlisted sailors complete basic military training at boot camp and then are sent to complete training for their individual careers.

Sailors prove they have mastered skills and deserve responsibilities by completing Personnel Qualification Standards (PQS) tasks and examinations. Among the most important is the "warfare qualification", which denotes a journeyman level of capability in Surface Warfare, Aviation Warfare, Information Dominance Warfare, Naval Aircrew, Special Warfare, Seabee Warfare, Submarine Warfare or Expeditionary Warfare. Many qualifications are denoted on a sailor's uniform with U.S. Navy badges and insignia.

=== Uniforms ===
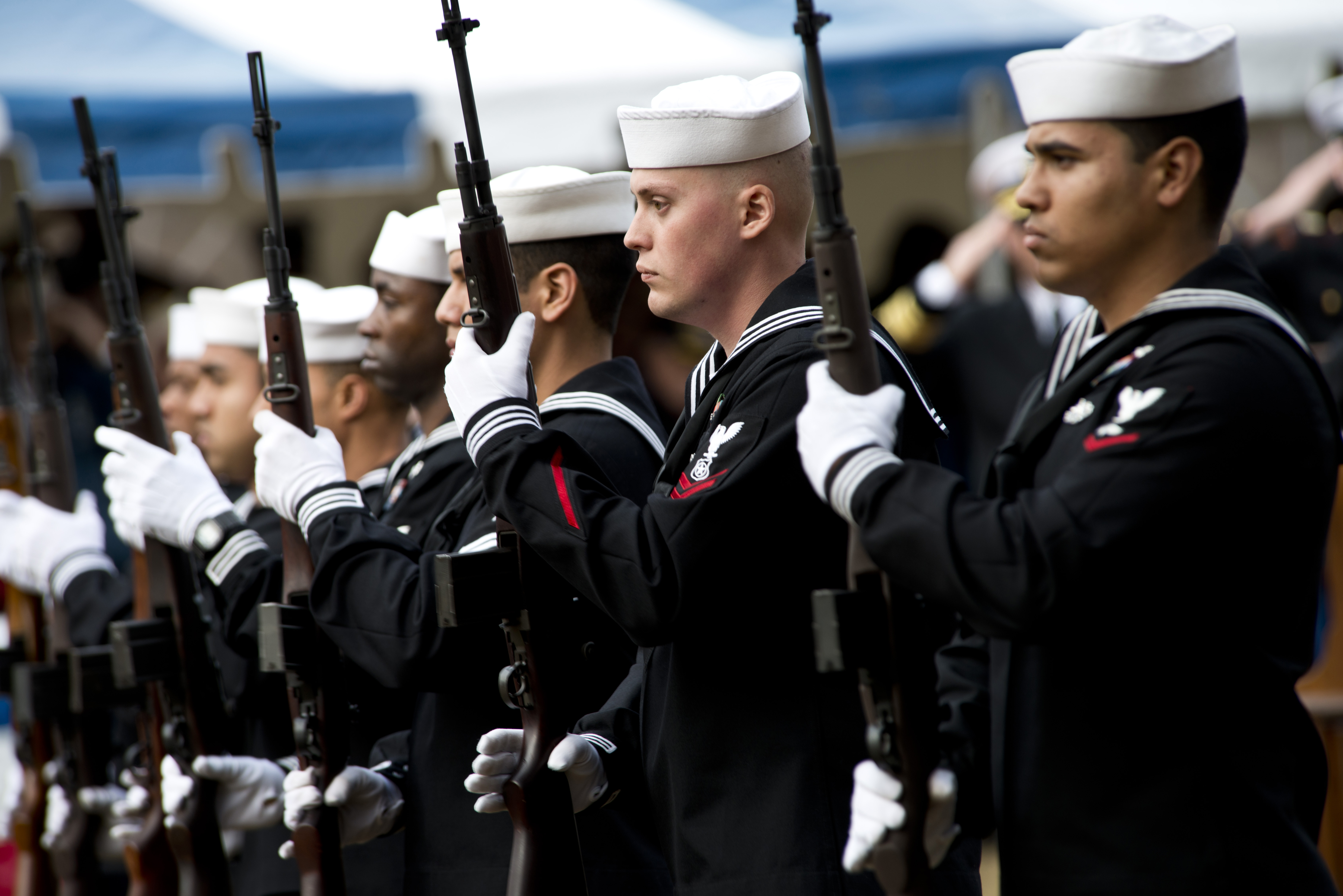
Members of the Honor Guard prepare for the 21 Gun Salute during a Pearl Harbor Remembrance Ceremony at Joint Expeditionary Base Little Creek-Fort Story, 7 December 2012

The uniforms of the U.S. Navy have evolved gradually since the first uniform regulations for officers were issued in 1802 on the formation of the Navy Department. The predominant colors of U.S. Navy uniforms are navy blue and white. U.S. Navy uniforms were based on Royal Navy uniforms of the time and have tended to follow that template.

==== Commissioned officers ====
US DoD pay grade	Special grade (Note: Reserved for wartime use only.)	O-10	O-9	O-8	O-7	O-6	O-5	O-4	O-3	O-2	O-1
NATO code	OF-10	OF-9	OF-8	OF-7	OF-6	OF-5	OF-4	OF-3	OF-2	OF-1
Collar insignia
Shoulder insignia
Sleeve insignia
Title	Fleet admiral	Admiral	Vice admiral	Rear admiral	Rear admiral (lower half)	Captain	Commander	Lieutenant commander	Lieutenant	Lieutenant (junior grade)	Ensign
Abbreviation	FADM	ADM	VADM	RADM	RDML	CAPT	CDR	LCDR	LT	LTJG	ENS

Navy officers serve either as a line officer or as a staff corps officer. Line officers wear an embroidered gold star above their rank of the naval service dress uniform while staff corps officers and commissioned warrant officers wear unique designator insignias that denotes their occupational specialty.

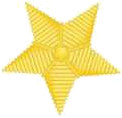
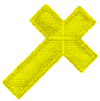
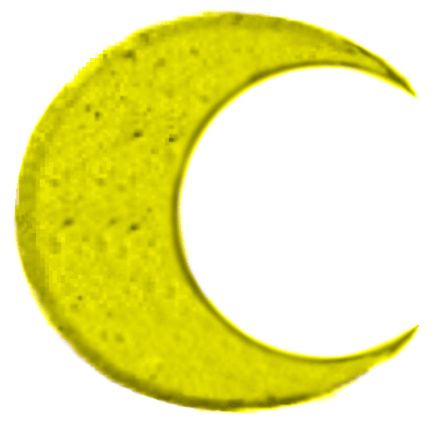
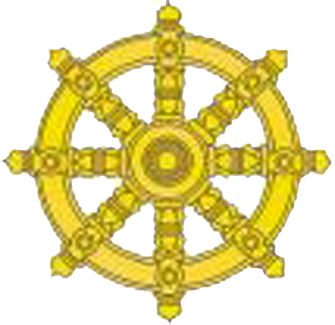
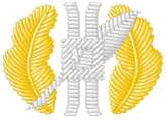
Type	Line officer	Medical Corps	Dental Corps	Nurse Corps	Medical Service Corps	Judge Advocate General's Corps
Insignia
Designator^{1}	1XXX	210X	220X	290X	230X	250X
Chaplain Corps (Christian Faith)	Chaplain Corps (Jewish Faith)	Chaplain Corps (Muslim Faith)	Chaplain Corps (Buddhist Faith)	Supply Corps	Civil Engineer Corps	Law Community (Limited Duty Officer)
410X	410X	410X	410X	310X	510X	655X

==== Warrant officers ====
US DoD pay grade	W-5	W-4	W-3	W-2	W-1
NATO code	WO-5	WO-4	WO-3	WO-2	WO-1
Collar insignia
Shoulder insignia
Sleeve insignia
Title	Chief warrant officer 5	Chief warrant officer 4	Chief warrant officer 3	Chief warrant officer 2	Warrant officer 1
Abbreviation	CWO-5	CWO-4	CWO-3	CWO-2	WO-1

Warrant and chief warrant officer ranks are held by technical specialists who direct specific activities essential to the proper operation of the ship, which also require commissioned officer authority. Navy warrant officers serve in 30 specialties covering five categories. Warrant officers should not be confused with the limited duty officer (LDO) in the Navy. Warrant officers perform duties that are directly related to their previous enlisted service and specialized training. This allows the Navy to capitalize on the experience of warrant officers without having to frequently transition them to other duty assignments for advancement. Most Navy warrant officers are accessed from the chief petty officer pay grades, E-7 through E-9, analogous to a senior non-commissioned officer in the other services, and must have a minimum 14 years in service.

==== Enlisted ====
Sailors in pay grades E-1 through E-3 are considered to be in apprenticeships. They are divided into five definable groups, with colored group rate marks designating the group to which they belong: Seaman, Fireman, Airman, Constructionman, and Hospitalman. E-4 to E-6 are non-commissioned officers (NCOs), and are specifically called Petty officers in the Navy. Petty Officers perform not only the duties of their specific career field but also serve as leaders to junior enlisted personnel. E-7 to E-9 are still considered Petty Officers, but are considered a separate community within the Navy. They have separate berthing and dining facilities (where feasible), wear separate uniforms, and perform separate duties.

After attaining the rate of Master Chief Petty Officer, a service member may choose to further their career by becoming a Command Master Chief Petty Officer (CMC). A CMC is considered to be the senior-most enlisted service member within a command, and is the special assistant to the commanding officer in all matters pertaining to the health, welfare, job satisfaction, morale, use, advancement and training of the command's enlisted personnel. CMCs can be Command level (within a single unit, such as a ship or shore station), Fleet level (squadrons consisting of multiple operational units, headed by a flag officer or commodore), or Force level (consisting of a separate community within the Navy, such as Subsurface, Air, Reserves).

CMC insignia are similar to the insignia for Master Chief, except that the rating symbol is replaced by an inverted five-point star, reflecting a change in their rating from their previous rating (i.e., MMCM) to CMDCM. The stars for Command Master Chief are silver, while stars for Fleet, and gold stars for Force. Additionally, CMCs wear a badge, worn on their left breast pocket, denoting their title (Command/Fleet/Force).

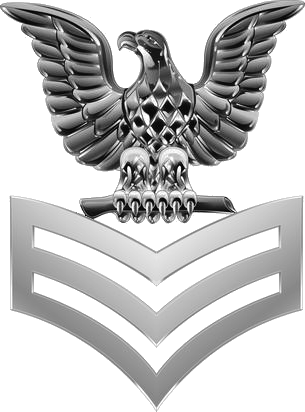
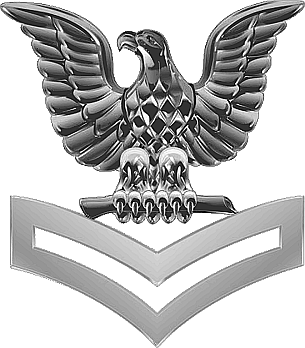
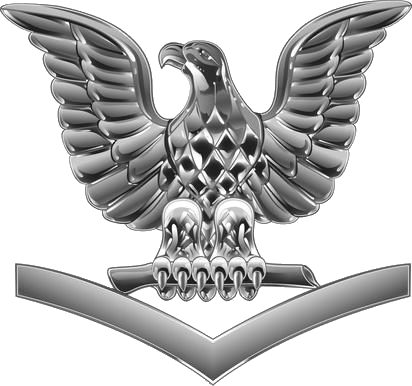
US DoD pay grade	E-9 Special (Note: SEAC and MCPON have E-9 pay grades but are given unique pay.)		E-9			E-8		E-7	E-6	E-5	E-4	E-3	E-2	E-1
NATO code	OR-9					OR-8		OR-7	OR-6	OR-5	OR-4	OR-3	OR-2	OR-1
Collar insignia														No insignia
Sleeve insignia														No insignia
Title	Senior Enlisted Advisor to the Chairman	Master Chief Petty Officer of the Navy	Fleet/force master chief petty officer	Command master chief petty officer	Master chief petty officer	Command senior chief petty officer	Senior chief petty officer	Chief petty officer	Petty officer first class	Petty officer second class	Petty officer third class	Seaman	Seaman apprentice	Seaman recruit
Abbreviation	SEAC	MCPON	FLTCM/FORCM	CMDCM	MCPO	CMDCS	SCPO	CPO	PO1	PO2	PO3	SN	SA	SR

==== Badges of the United States Navy ====
Insignia and badges of the United States Navy are military "badges" issued by the Department of the Navy to naval service members who achieve certain qualifications and accomplishments while serving on both active and reserve duty in the United States Navy. Most naval aviation insignia are also permitted for wear on uniforms of the United States Marine Corps.

As described in Chapter 5 of U.S. Navy Uniform Regulations, "badges" are categorized as breast insignia (usually worn immediately above and below ribbons) and identification badges (usually worn at breast pocket level). Breast insignia are further divided between command and warfare and other qualification.

Insignia come in the form of metal "pin-on devices" worn on formal uniforms and embroidered "tape strips" worn on work uniforms. For the purpose of this article, the general term "insignia" shall be used to describe both, as it is done in Navy Uniform Regulations. The term "badge", although used ambiguously in other military branches and in informal speak to describe any pin, patch, or tab, is exclusive to identification badges and authorized marksmanship awards according to the language in Navy Uniform Regulations, Chapter 5. Below are just a few of the many badges maintained by the Navy. The rest can be seen in the article cited at the top of this section:

Naval Aviator Badge

Submarine Officer badge

Surface Warfare Officer Insignia

== Bases ==
Map of naval bases in the United States

The size, complexity, and international presence of the United States Navy requires a large number of navy installations to support its operations. While the majority of bases are located inside the United States itself, the Navy maintains a significant number of facilities abroad, either in U.S.-controlled territories or in foreign countries under a Status of Forces Agreement (SOFA).

=== Eastern United States ===
The second largest concentration of installations is at Hampton Roads, Virginia, where the navy occupies over 36,000 acres (15,000 ha) of land. Located at Hampton Roads are Naval Station Norfolk, homeport of the Atlantic Fleet; Naval Air Station Oceana, a master jet base; Naval Amphibious Base Little Creek; and Training Support Center Hampton Roads as well as a number of Navy and commercial shipyards that service navy vessels. The Aegis Training and Readiness Center is located at the Naval Support Activity South Potomac in Dahlgren, Virginia. Maryland is home to NAS Patuxent River, which houses the Navy's Test Pilot School. Also located in Maryland is the United States Naval Academy, situated in Annapolis. NS Newport in Newport, Rhode Island is home to many schools and tenant commands, including the Officer Candidate School, Naval Undersea Warfare Center, and more, and also maintains inactive ships.

There is also a naval base in Charleston, South Carolina. This is home to the Naval Nuclear Power Training Command, under which reside the Nuclear Field "A" Schools (for Machinist Mates (Nuclear), Electrician Mates (Nuclear), and Electronics Technicians (Nuclear)), Nuclear Power School (Officer and Enlisted); and one of two Nuclear Power Training Unit 'Prototype' schools. The state of Florida is the location of three major bases, NS Mayport, the Navy's fourth largest, in Jacksonville, Florida; NAS Jacksonville, a Master Air Anti-submarine Warfare base; and NAS Pensacola; home of the Naval Education and Training Command, the Naval Air Technical Training Center that provides specialty training for enlisted aviation personnel and is the primary flight training base for Navy and Marine Corps Naval Flight Officers and enlisted Naval Aircrewmen. There is also NSA Panama City, Florida which is home to the Center for Explosive Ordnance Disposal and Diving (CENEODIVE) and the Navy Diving and Salvage Training Center and NSA Orlando, Florida, which home to the Naval Air Warfare Center Training Systems Division (NAWCTSD).

The main U.S. Navy submarine bases on the east coast are located in Naval Submarine Base New London in Groton, Connecticut and NSB Kings Bay in Kings Bay, Georgia. The Portsmouth Naval Shipyard near Portsmouth, New Hampshire, which repairs naval submarines. NS Great Lakes, north of Chicago, Illinois is the home of the Navy's boot camp for enlisted sailors.

The Washington Navy Yard in Washington, D.C., is the Navy's oldest shore establishment and serves as a ceremonial and administrative center for the U.S. Navy, home to the chief of naval operations and numerous commands.

=== Western United States and Hawaii ===
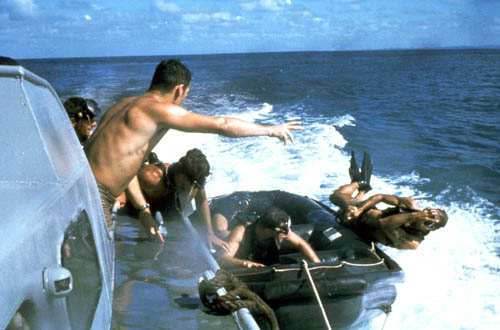
Underwater Demolition Team members using the casting technique from a speeding boat

The U.S. Navy's largest complex is Naval Air Weapons Station China Lake, California, which covers 1.1 million acres (4,500 km^{2}) of land, or approximately one-third of the U.S. Navy's total land holdings.

Naval Base San Diego, California, is the main homeport of the Pacific Fleet, although its headquarters is located in Pearl Harbor, Hawaii. NAS North Island is located on the north side of Coronado, California, and is home to Headquarters for Naval Air Forces and Naval Air Force Pacific, the bulk of the Pacific Fleet's helicopter squadrons, and part of the West Coast aircraft carrier fleet. NAB Coronado is located on the southern end of the Coronado Island and is home to the navy's west coast SEAL teams and special boat units. NAB Coronado is also home to the Naval Special Warfare Center, the primary training center for SEALs.

The other major collection of naval bases on the west coast is in Puget Sound, Washington. Among them, NS Everett is one of the newer bases and the navy states that it is its most modern facility.

NAS Fallon, Nevada serves as the primary training ground for navy strike aircrews and is home to the Naval Strike Air Warfare Center. Master Jet Bases are also located at NAS Lemoore, California, and NAS Whidbey Island, Washington, while the carrier-based airborne early warning aircraft community and major air test activities are located at NAS Point Mugu, California. The naval presence in Hawaii is centered on NS Pearl Harbor, which hosts the headquarters of the Pacific Fleet and many of its subordinate commands.

=== United States territories ===
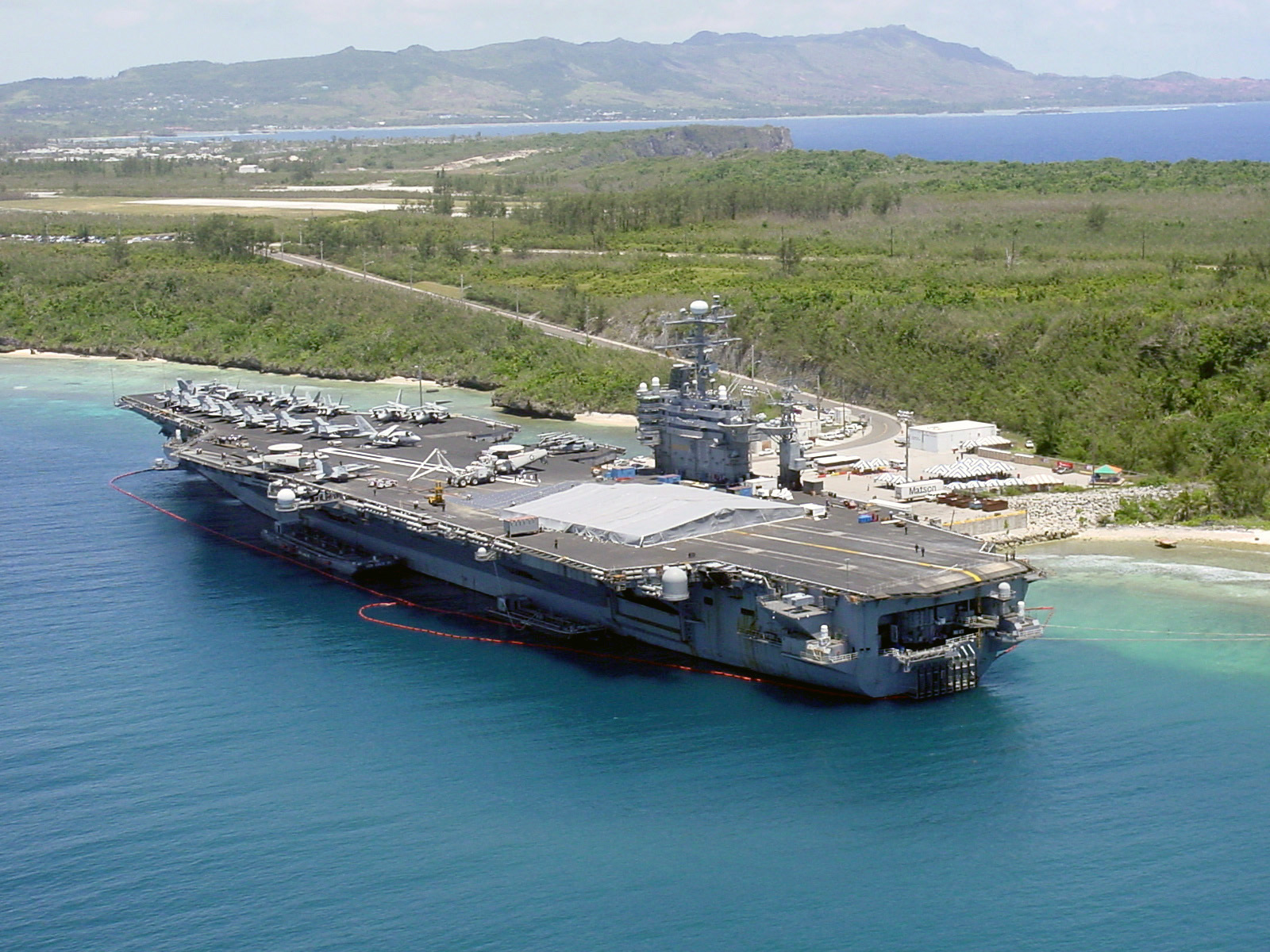
USS Carl Vinson pier side in Apra Harbor, Guam

Guam, an island strategically located in the Western Pacific Ocean, maintains a sizable U.S. Navy presence, including NB Guam. The westernmost U.S. territory, it contains a natural Deepwater harbor capable of harboring aircraft carriers in emergencies. Its naval air station was deactivated in 1995 and its flight activities transferred to nearby Andersen Air Force Base.

Puerto Rico in the Caribbean formerly housed NS Roosevelt Roads, which was shut down in 2004 shortly after the controversial closure of the live ordnance training area on nearby Vieques Island.

=== Foreign countries ===
The largest overseas base is the United States Fleet Activities Yokosuka, Japan, which serves as the home port for the navy's largest forward-deployed fleet and is a significant base of operations in the Western Pacific.

European operations revolve around facilities in Italy (NAS Sigonella and Naval Computer and Telecommunications Station Naples) with NSA Naples as the homeport for the Sixth Fleet and Command Naval Region Europe, Africa, Southwest Asia (CNREURAFSWA), and additional facilities in nearby Gaeta. There is also NS Rota in Spain and NSA Souda Bay in Greece.

In the Middle East, naval facilities are located almost exclusively in countries bordering the Persian Gulf, with NSA Bahrain serving as the headquarters of U.S. Naval Forces Central Command and U.S. Fifth Fleet.

NS Guantanamo Bay in Cuba is the oldest overseas facility and has become known in recent years as the location of a detention camp for suspected al-Qaeda operatives.

== Equipment ==
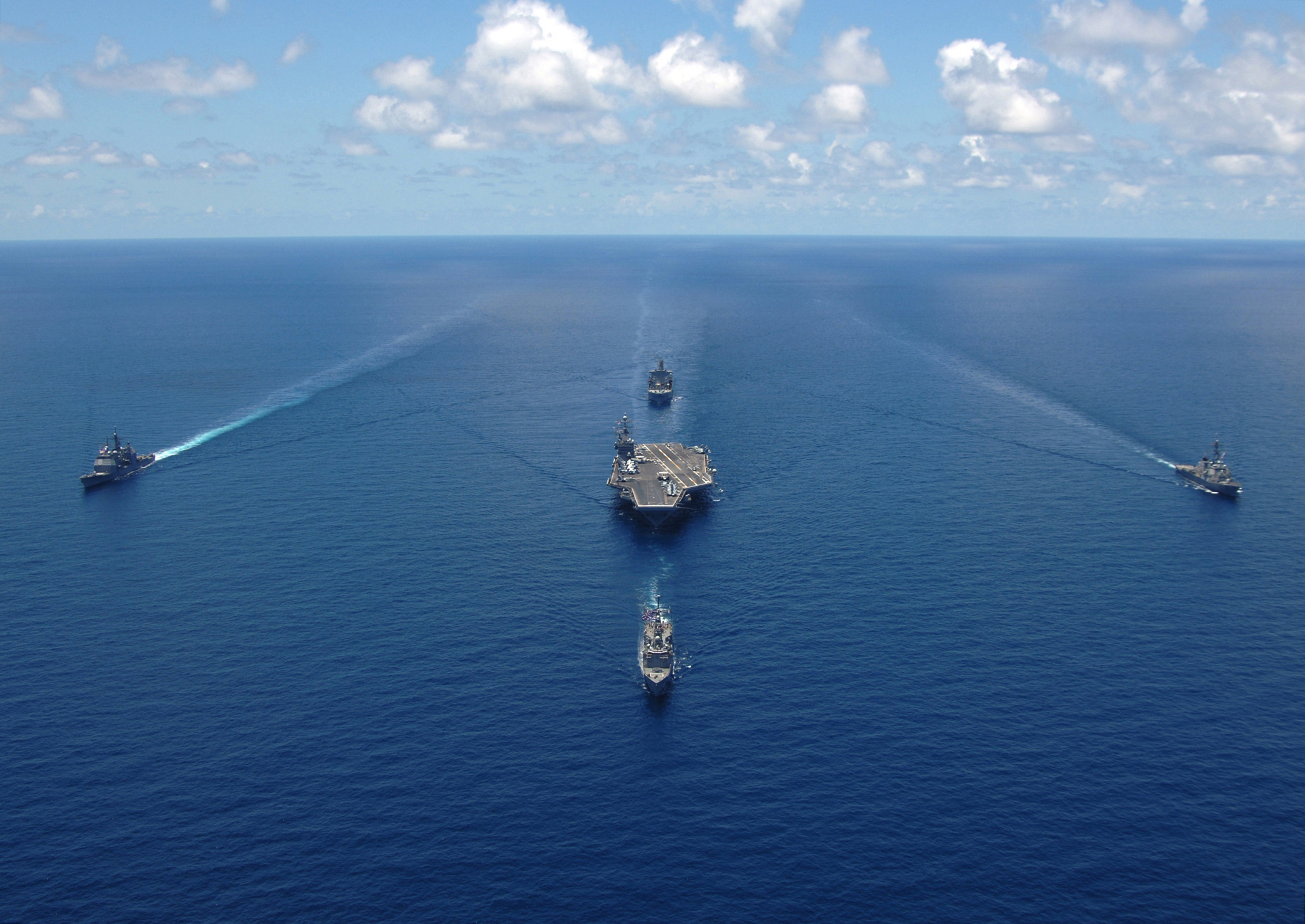
USS George Washington carrier strike group sails in formation, 29 April 2006.

As of 2018, the navy operates over 460 ships (including vessels operated by the Military Sealift Command), 3,650+ aircraft, 50,000 non-combat vehicles and owns 75,200 buildings on 3,300,000 acres (13,000 km^{2}).

=== Ships ===
The names of commissioned ships of the U.S. Navy are prefixed with the letters "USS", designating "United States Ship". Non-commissioned, civilian-manned vessels of the navy have names that begin with "USNS", standing for "United States Naval Ship". The names of ships are officially selected by the secretary of the navy, often to honor important people or places. Additionally, each ship is given a letter-based hull classification symbol (for example, CVN or DDG) to indicate the vessel's type and number. All ships in the navy inventory are placed in the Naval Vessel Register, which is part of "the Navy List" (required by article 29 of the United Nations Convention on the Law of the Sea). The register tracks data such as the current status of a ship, the date of its commissioning, and the date of its decommissioning. Vessels that are removed from the register prior to disposal are said to be stricken from the register. The navy also maintains a reserve fleet of inactive vessels that are maintained for reactivation in times of need.

The U.S. Navy was one of the first to install nuclear reactors aboard naval vessels. Today, nuclear energy powers all active U.S. aircraft carriers and submarines.

In early 2010, the U.S. Navy had identified a need for 313 combat ships but could only afford 232 to 243 ships. In March 2014, the Navy started counting self-deployable support ships such as minesweepers, surveillance craft, and tugs in the "battle fleet" to reach a count of 272 as of October 2016, and it includes ships that have been put in "shrink wrap". The number of ships generally ranged between 270 and 300 throughout the late 2010s. As of February 2022, the Navy has 296 battle force ships, however analyses state the Navy needs a fleet of more than 500 to meet its commitments.

==== Aircraft carriers ====
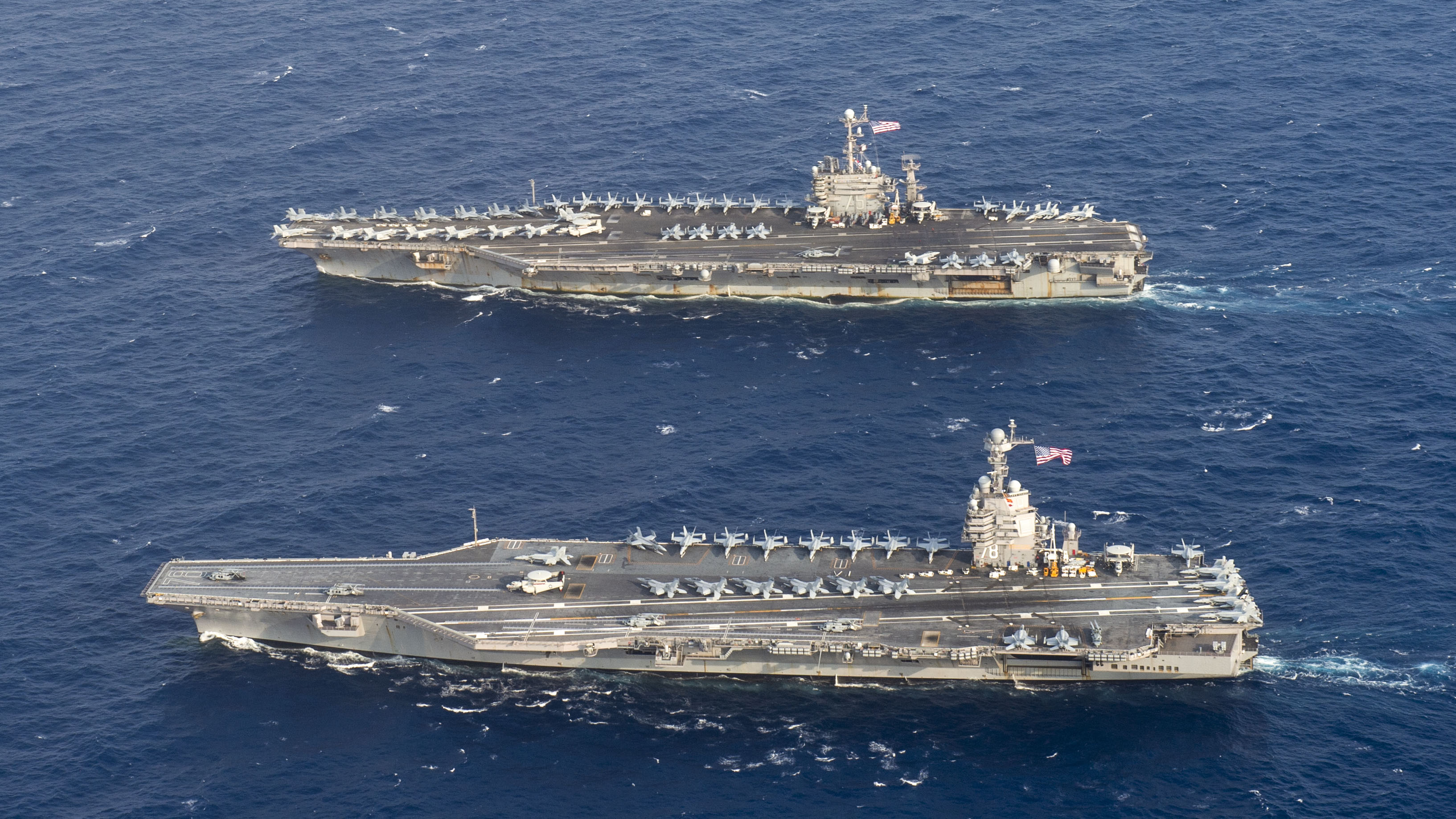
Aerial view of USS Gerald R. Ford (bottom), a ship of the new Gerald R. Ford class, alongside USS Harry S. Truman (top), a ship of the previous Nimitz class

Aircraft carriers act as airbases for carrier-based aircraft. They are the largest vessels in the Navy fleet and all are nuclear-powered. An aircraft carrier is typically deployed along with a host of additional vessels, forming a carrier strike group. The supporting ships, which usually include three or four Aegis-equipped cruisers and destroyers, a frigate, and two attack submarines, are tasked with protecting the carrier from air, missile, sea, and undersea threats as well as providing additional strike capabilities themselves. Ready logistics support for the group is provided by a combined ammunition, oiler, and supply ship. Modern carriers are named after American admirals and politicians, usually presidents.

The Navy has a statutory requirement for a minimum of 11 aircraft carriers. All 11 carriers are currently active, ten Nimitz-class and one Gerald R. Ford-class.

==== Amphibious warfare ships ====
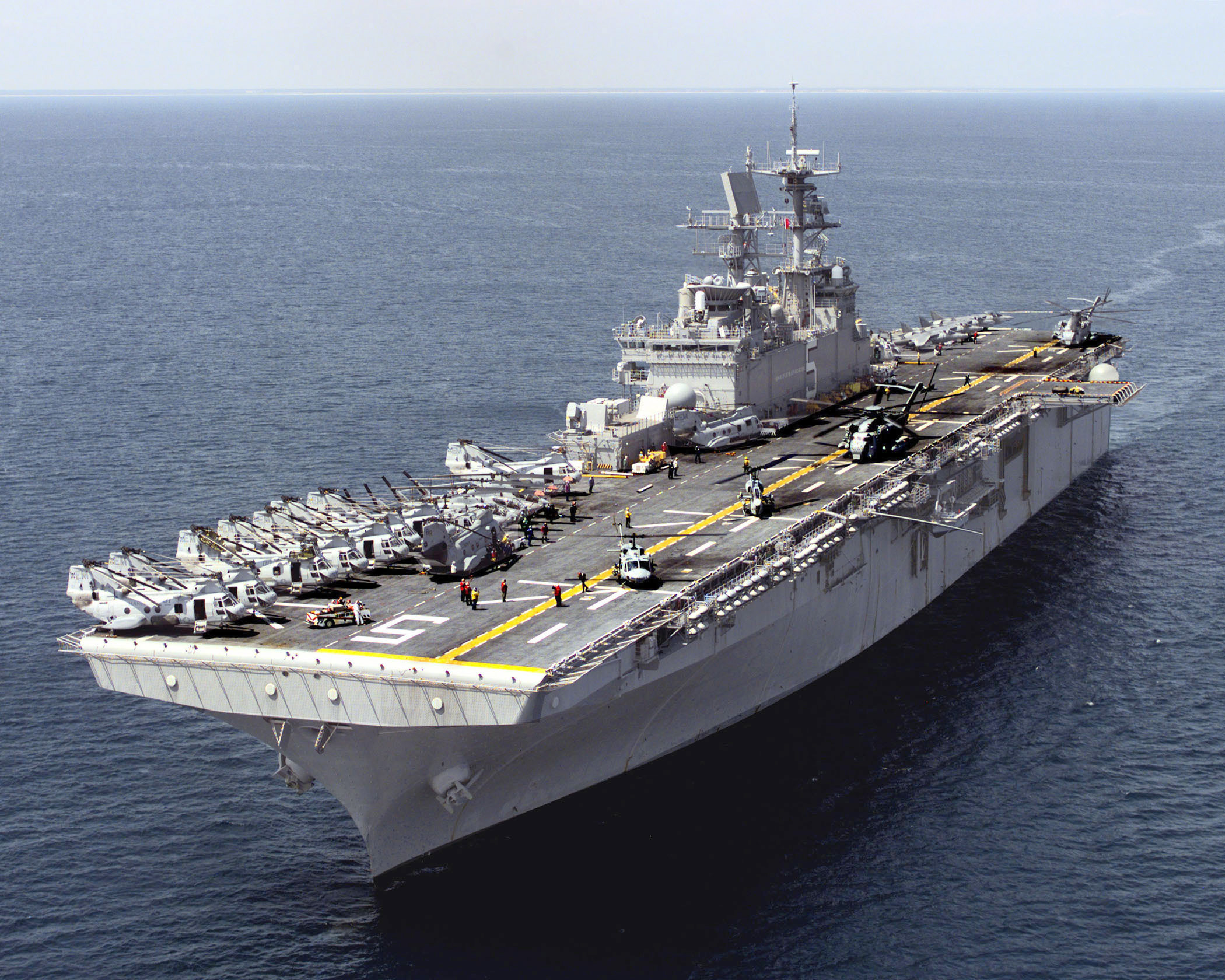
USS Bataan, a Wasp-class amphibious assault ship

Amphibious assault ships are the centerpieces of US amphibious warfare and fulfill the same power projection role as aircraft carriers except that their striking force centers on land forces instead of aircraft. They deliver, command, coordinate, and fully support all elements of a 2,200-strong Marine Expeditionary Unit in an amphibious assault using both air and amphibious vehicles. Resembling small aircraft carriers, amphibious assault ships are capable of V/STOL, STOVL, VTOL, tiltrotor, and rotary wing aircraft operations. They also contain a well deck to support the use of Landing Craft Air Cushion (LCAC) and other amphibious assault watercraft. Recently, amphibious assault ships have begun to be deployed as the core of an expeditionary strike group, which usually consists of an additional amphibious transport dock and dock landing ship for amphibious warfare and an Aegis-equipped cruiser and destroyer, frigate, and attack submarine for group defense. Amphibious assault ships are typically named after World War II aircraft carriers.

Amphibious transport docks are warships that embark, transport, and land Marines, supplies, and equipment in a supporting role during amphibious warfare missions. With a landing platform, amphibious transport docks also have the capability to serve as secondary aviation support for an expeditionary group. All amphibious transport docks can operate helicopters, LCACs, and other conventional amphibious vehicles while the newer San Antonio class of ships has been explicitly designed to operate all three elements of the Marines' "mobility triad": Expeditionary Fighting Vehicles (EFVs), the V-22 Osprey tiltrotor aircraft, and LCACs. Amphibious transport docks are typically named after U.S. cities.

The dock landing ship is a medium amphibious transport that is designed specifically to support and operate LCACs, though it is able to operate other amphibious assault vehicles in the United States inventory as well. Dock landing ships are normally deployed as a component of an expeditionary strike group's amphibious assault contingent, operating as a secondary launch platform for LCACs. All dock landing ships are named after cities or important places in U.S. and U.S. Naval history.

The Navy operates 32 amphibious warfare ships, eight Wasp class and two America class amphibious assault ships, four Harpers Ferry class and six Whidbey Island class dock landing ships, and 12 San Antonio class amphibious transport dock ships.

==== Cruisers ====
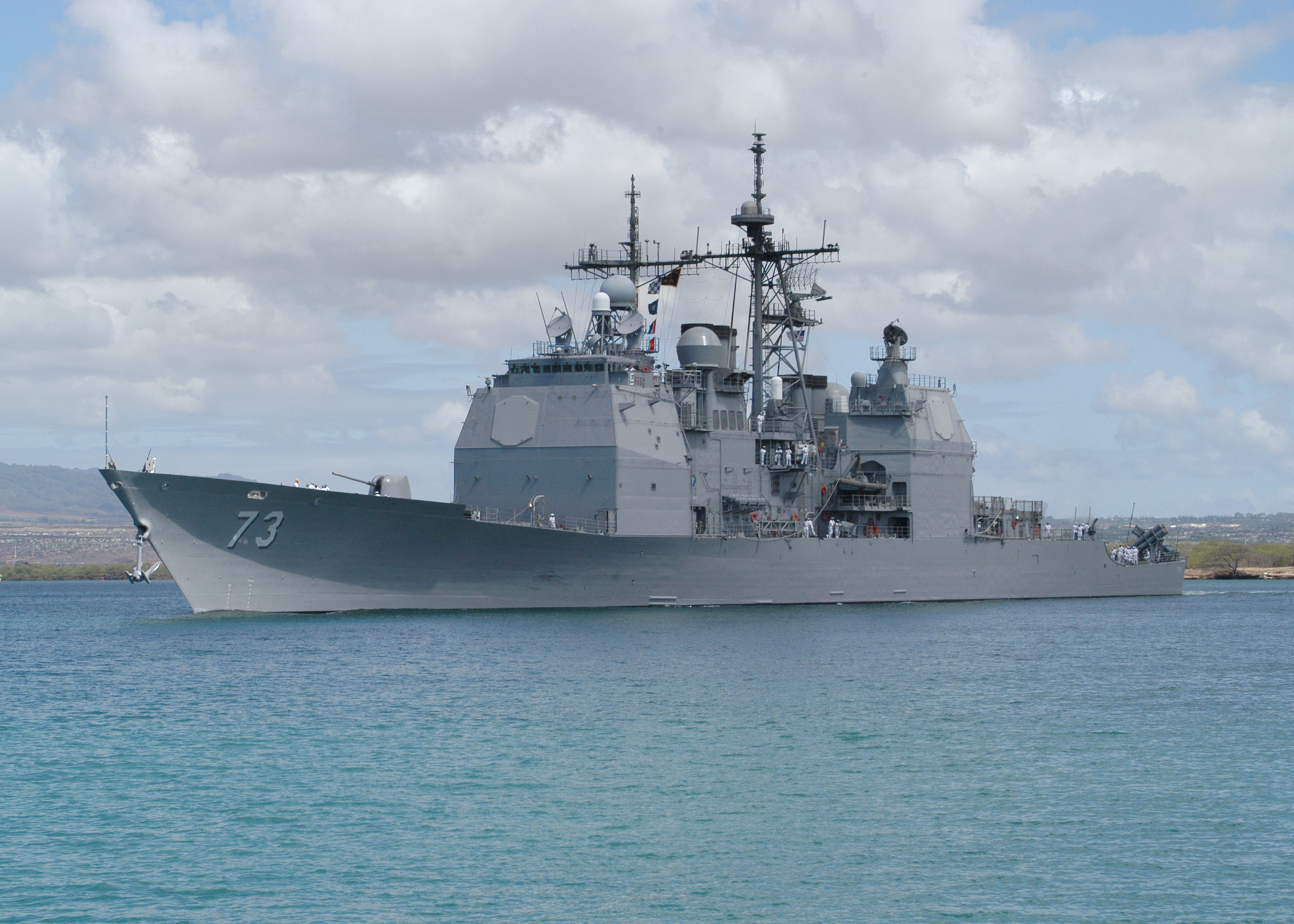
USS Port Royal, a Ticonderoga-class cruiser

Cruisers are large surface combat vessels that conduct anti-air/anti-missile warfare, surface warfare, anti-submarine warfare, and strike operations independently or as members of a larger task force. Modern guided missile cruisers were developed out of a need to counter the anti-ship missile threat facing the United States Navy. This led to the development of the AN/SPY-1 phased array radar and the RIM-67 Standard missile with the Aegis combat system coordinating the two. Ticonderoga-class cruisers were the first to be equipped with Aegis and were put to use primarily as anti-air and anti-missile defense in a battle force protection role. Later developments of vertical launch systems and the Tomahawk missile gave cruisers additional long-range land and sea strike capability, making them capable of both offensive and defensive battle operations. The Ticonderoga class is the only active class of cruiser. All cruisers in this class are named after battles.

==== Destroyers ====
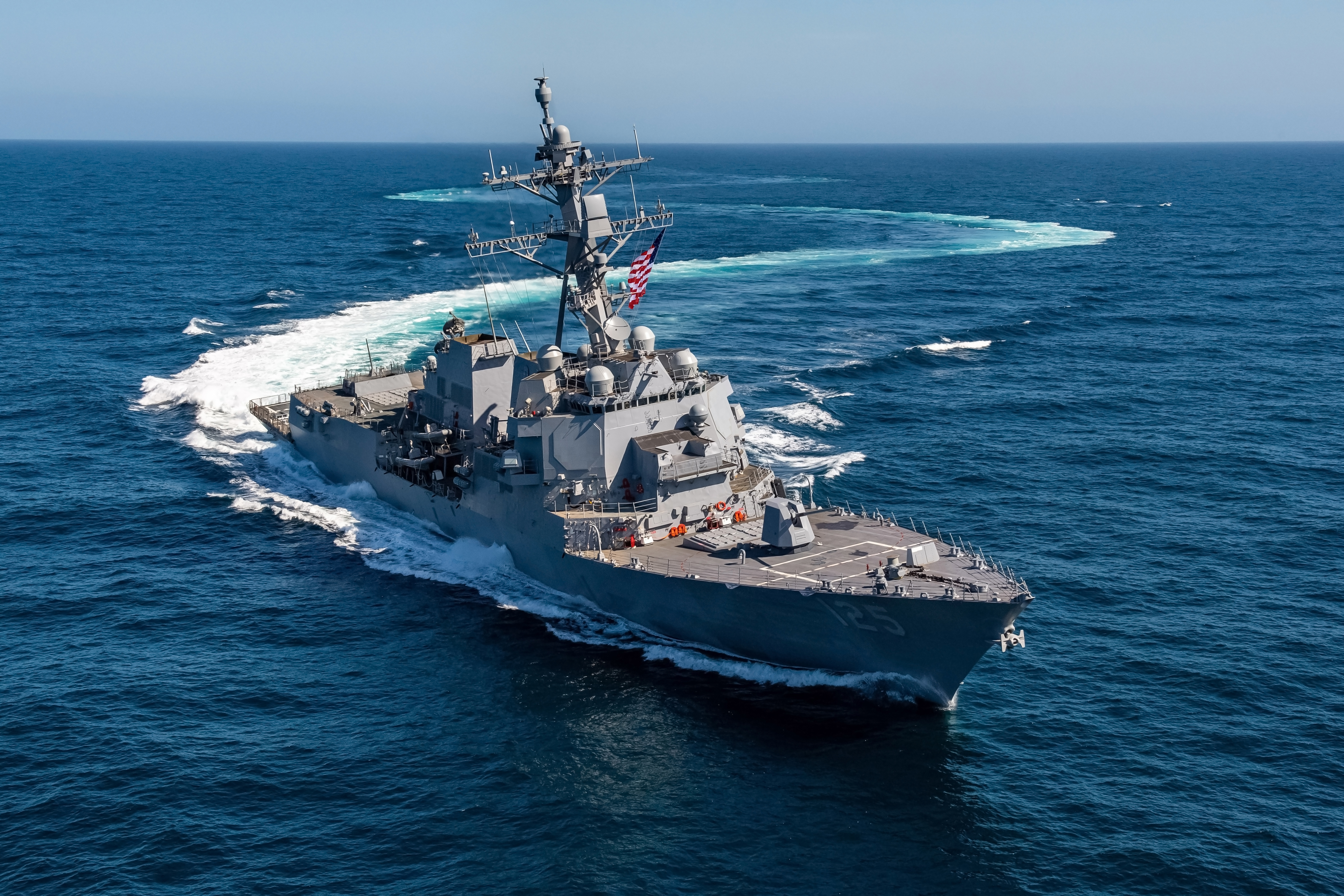
USS Jack H. Lucas, a Arleigh Burke-class destroyer

Destroyers are multi-mission medium surface ships capable of sustained performance in anti-air, anti-submarine, anti-ship, and offensive strike operations. Like cruisers, guided missile destroyers are primarily focused on surface strikes using Tomahawk missiles and fleet defense through Aegis and the Standard missile. Destroyers additionally specialize in anti-submarine warfare and are equipped with VLA rockets and LAMPS Mk III Sea Hawk helicopters to deal with underwater threats. When deployed with a carrier strike group or expeditionary strike group, destroyers and their fellow Aegis-equipped cruisers are primarily tasked with defending the fleet while providing secondary strike capabilities. With very few exceptions, destroyers are named after U.S. Navy, Marine Corps, and Coast Guard heroes.

The U.S. Navy currently has 75 destroyers, 73 Arleigh Burke-class destroyers and two Zumwalt-class stealth destroyers, with a third (the USS Lyndon B. Johnson) expected to enter service sometime in 2024.

==== Frigates and littoral combat ships ====
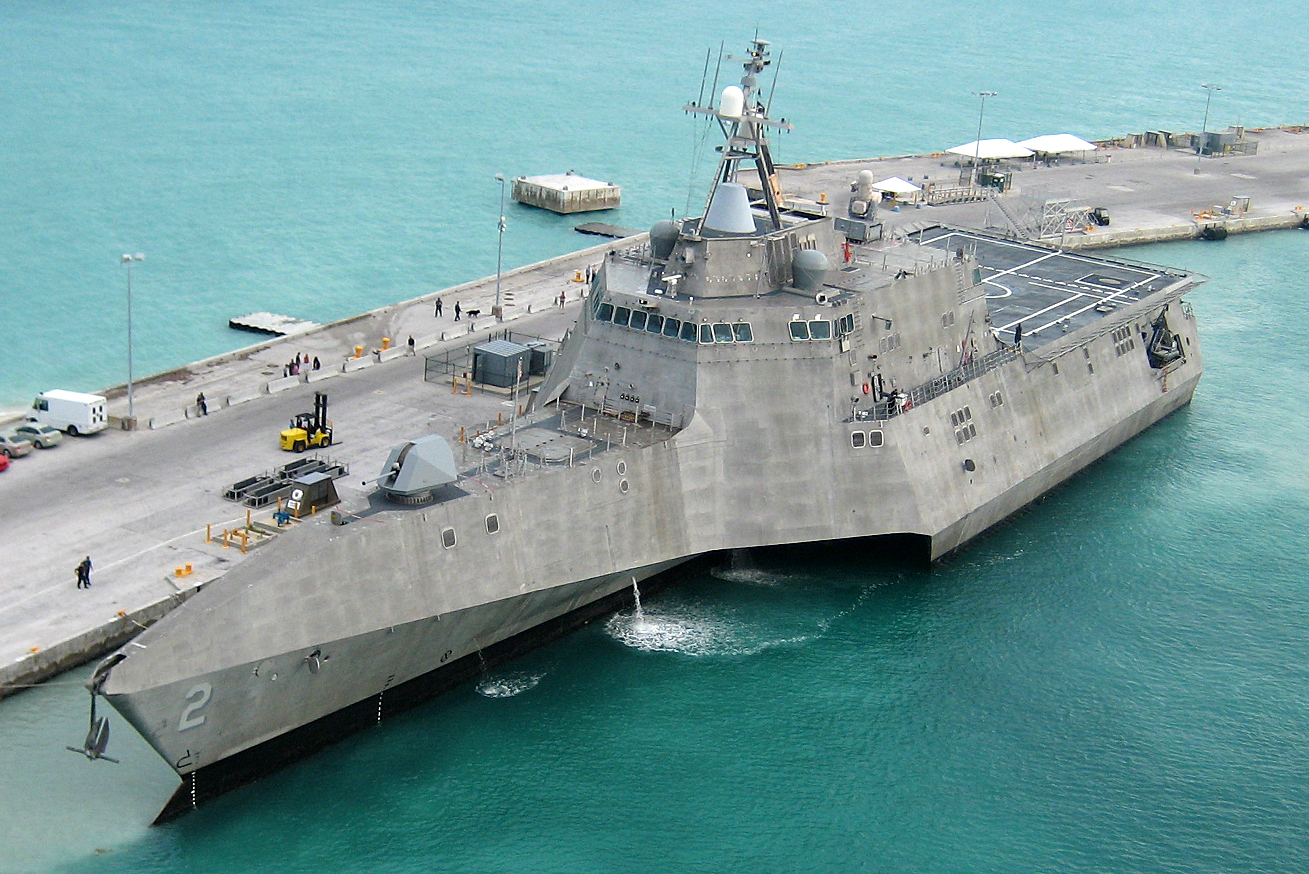
USS Independence, a littoral combat ship

Modern U.S. frigates mainly perform anti-submarine warfare for carrier and expeditionary strike groups and provide armed escort for supply convoys and merchant shipping. They are designed to protect friendly ships against hostile submarines in low to medium threat environments, using torpedoes and LAMPS helicopters. Independently, frigates are able to conduct counterdrug missions and other maritime interception operations. As in the case of destroyers, frigates are named after U.S. Navy, Marine Corps, and Coast Guard heroes.

In late 2015, the U.S. Navy retired its most recent class of traditional frigates in favor of the littoral combat ship (LCS), relatively small vessels designed for near-shore operations that was expected to assume many of the duties the frigate had with the fleet. The LCS was "envisioned to be a networked, agile, stealthy surface combatant capable of defeating anti-access and asymmetric threats in the littorals", although their ability to perform these missions in practice has been called into question. The Navy has announced it plans to reduce procurement of the LCS and retire early examples of the type.

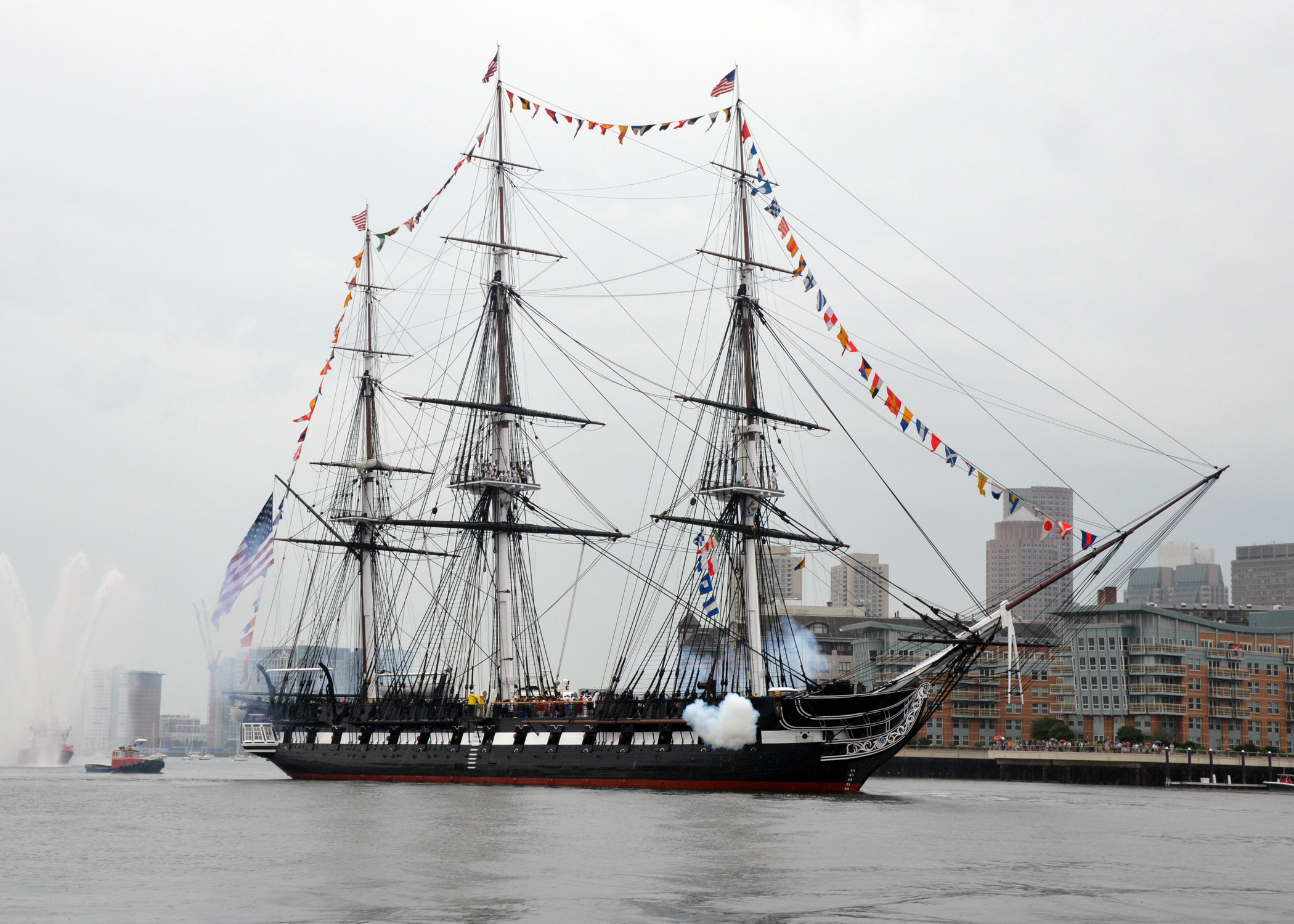
USS Constitution, firing a 17-gun salute in 2014

The Navy planned to purchase up to 20 of the Constellation-class frigate (18 cancelled 2 under construction to be completed). Constellation is based on the FREMM multipurpose frigate, already in service with European navies.

The U.S. Navy has 23 littoral combat ships, eight Freedom-class and 15 Independence-class ships as of 2025.

==== Mine countermeasures ships ====
Mine countermeasures vessels are a combination of minehunters, a naval vessel that actively detects and destroys individual naval mines, and minesweepers, which clear mined areas as a whole, without prior detection of the mines. MCM vessels have mostly legacy names of previous US Navy ships, especially World War II-era minesweepers.

The Navy operates eight Avenger-class mine countermeasures ships, with four expected to be retired in 2024.

==== Submarines ====
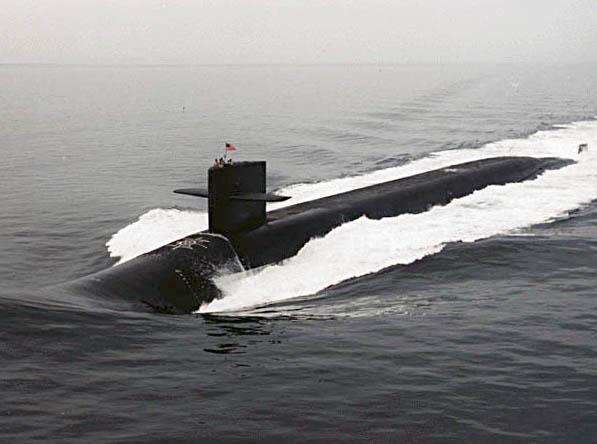
USS Kentucky, an Ohio-class ballistic missile submarine

The U.S. Navy operates three types of submarines: attack submarines, ballistic missile submarines and guided missile submarines. All current and planned U.S. Navy submarines are nuclear-powered, as nuclear propulsion allows for a combination of stealth and long-duration, high-speed, sustained underwater movement.

Attack submarines typically operate as part of a carrier battle group, while guided missile submarines generally operate independently and carry larger quantities of cruise missiles. Both types have several tactical missions, including sinking ships and other subs, launching cruise missiles, gathering intelligence, and assisting in special operations. Ballistic missile submarines operate independently with only one mission: to carry and, if called upon, to launch the Trident nuclear missile.

The Navy operates 69 submarines, 29 Los Angeles class attack submarines (with two more in reserve), 18 Ohio class submarines with 14 configured as ballistic missile submarines and four configured as guided missile submarines, three Seawolf class attack submarines, and 19 Virginia class attack submarines.

==== Other ====
A special case is the USS Constitution, commissioned in 1797 as one of the original six frigates of the United States Navy and which remains in commission at the Charlestown Navy Yard in Boston. She occasionally sails for commemorative events such as Independence Day.

The Navy operates a class of small tugboats, called Barrier Boats.

=== Aircraft ===
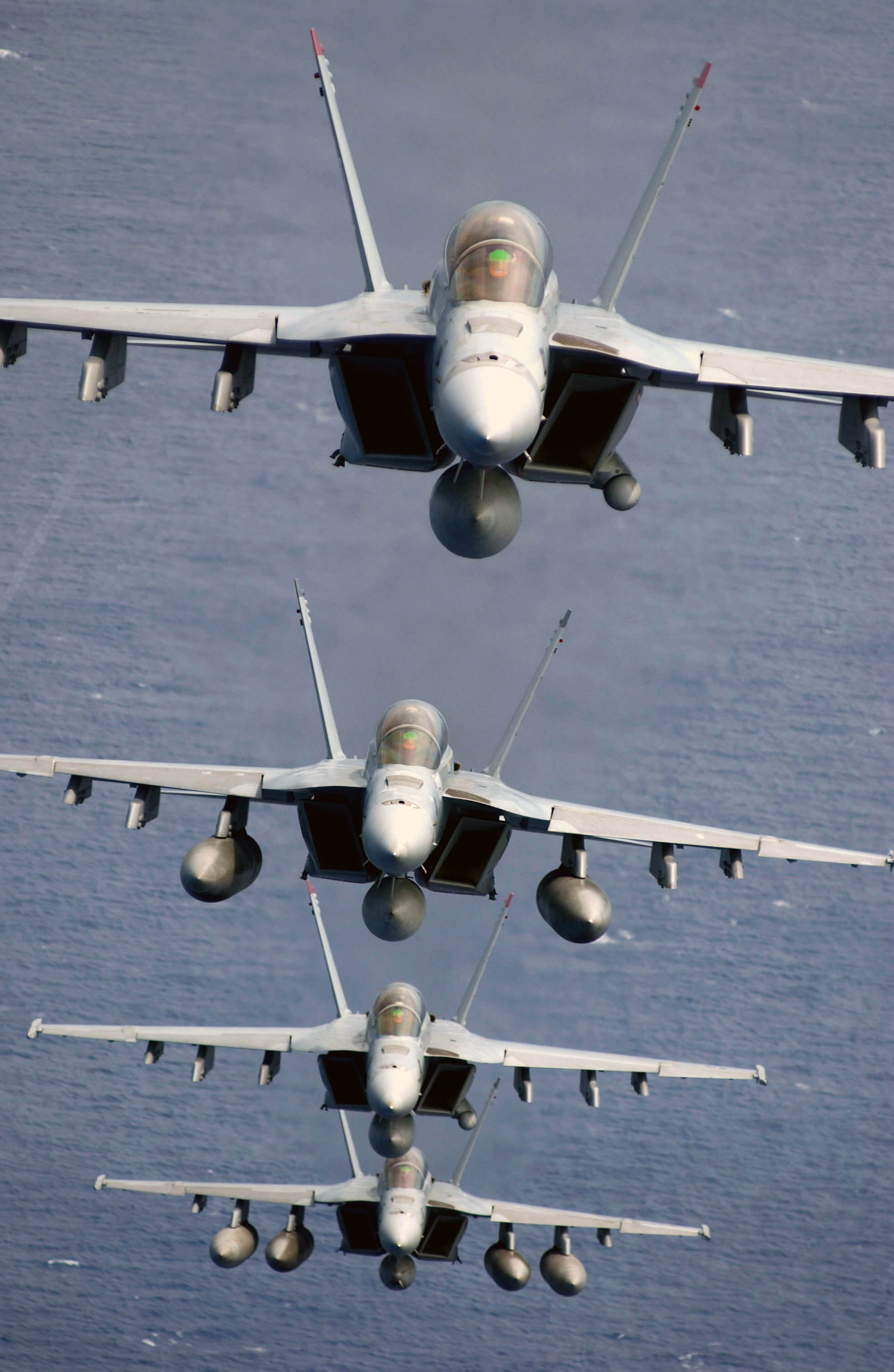
Four Navy F/A-18E/F Super Hornets

Carrier-based aircraft are able to strike air, sea, and land targets far from a carrier strike group while protecting friendly forces from enemy aircraft, ships, and submarines. In peacetime, aircraft's ability to project the threat of sustained attack from a mobile platform on the seas gives United States leaders significant diplomatic and crisis-management options. Aircraft additionally provide logistics support to maintain the navy's readiness and, through helicopters, supply platforms with which to conduct search and rescue, special operations, anti-submarine warfare (ASW), and anti-surface warfare, including the U.S. Navy's premier Maritime Strike and only organic ASW aircraft, the venerable Sikorsky MH-60R operated by Helicopter Maritime Strike Wing.

The U.S. Navy began to research the use of aircraft at sea in the 1910s, with Lieutenant Theodore G. "Spuds" Ellyson becoming the first naval aviator on 28 January 1911, and commissioned its first aircraft carrier, USS Langley (CV-1), in 1922. United States naval aviation fully came of age in World War II, when it became clear following the attack on Pearl Harbor, the Battle of the Coral Sea, and the Battle of Midway that aircraft carriers and the planes that they carried had replaced the battleship as the greatest weapon on the seas. Leading navy aircraft in World War II included the Grumman F4F Wildcat, the Grumman F6F Hellcat, the Chance Vought F4U Corsair, the Douglas SBD Dauntless, and the Grumman TBF Avenger. Navy aircraft also played a significant role in conflicts during the following Cold War years, with the F-4 Phantom II and the F-14 Tomcat becoming military icons of the era. The navy's current primary fighter-attack airplane is the multi-mission F/A-18E/F Super Hornet. The F-35C entered service in 2019. The Navy is also looking to eventually replace its F/A-18E/F Super Hornets with the F/A-XX program.

The Aircraft Investment Plan sees naval aviation growing from 30 percent of current aviation forces to half of all procurement funding over the next three decades.

=== Weapons ===
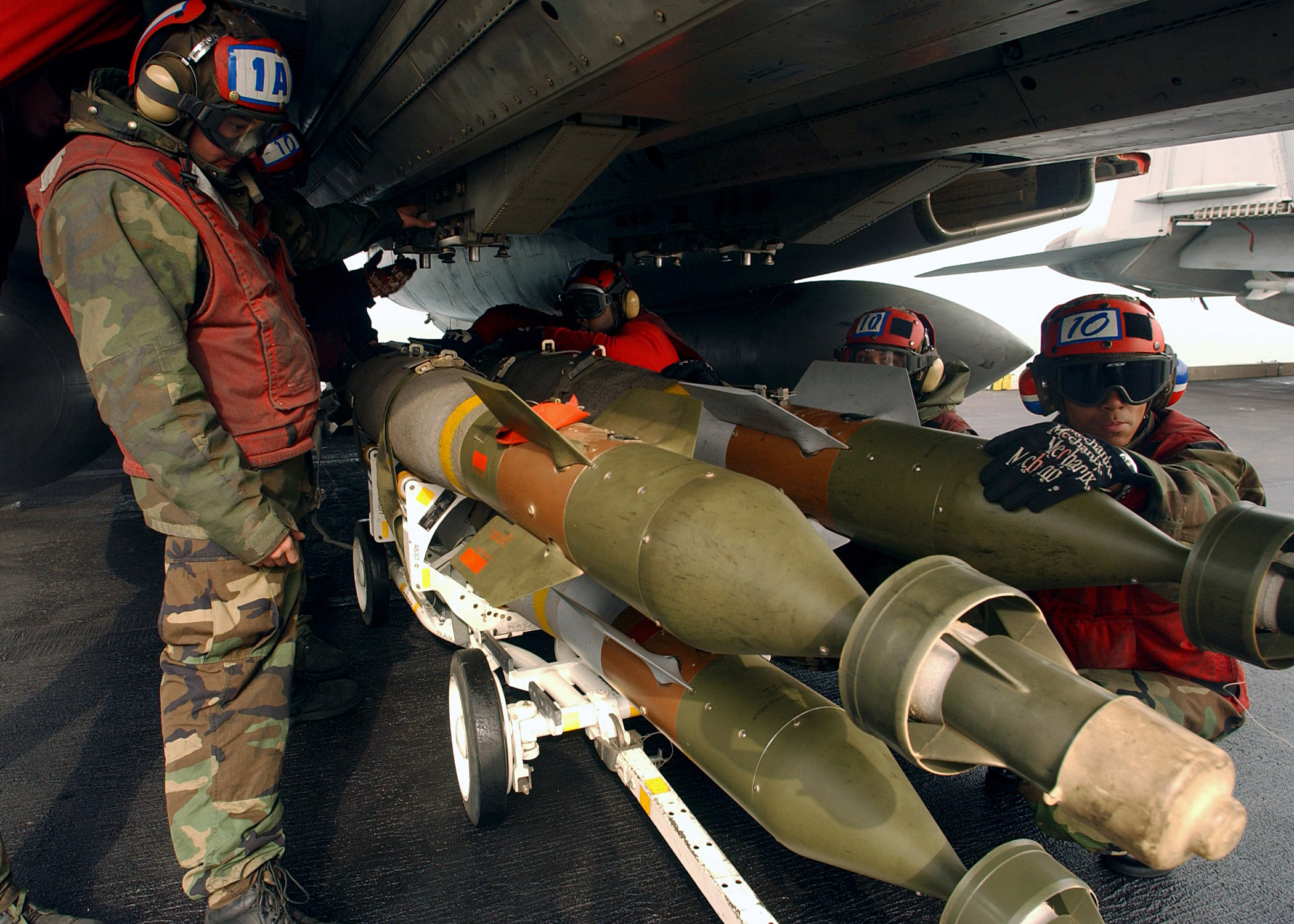
Aviation ordnancemen loading GBU-12 bombs in 2005

Current U.S. Navy shipboard weapons systems are almost entirely focused on missiles, both as a weapon and as a threat. In an offensive role, missiles are intended to strike targets at long distances with accuracy and precision. Because they are unmanned weapons, missiles allow for attacks on heavily defended targets without risk to human pilots. Land strikes are the domain of the BGM-109 Tomahawk, which was first deployed in the 1980s and is continually being updated to increase its capabilities. For anti-ship strikes, the navy's dedicated missile is the Harpoon Missile. To defend against enemy missile attack, the navy operates a number of systems that are all coordinated by the Aegis combat system. Medium-long range defense is provided by the Standard Missile 2, which has been deployed since the 1980s. The Standard missile doubles as the primary shipboard anti-aircraft weapon and is undergoing development for use in theater ballistic missile defense. Short range defense against missiles is provided by the Phalanx CIWS and the more recently developed RIM-162 Evolved Sea Sparrow Missile. In addition to missiles, the navy employs Mark 46, Mark 48, and Mark 50 torpedoes and various types of naval mines.

Naval fixed-wing aircraft employ much of the same weapons as the United States Air Force for both air-to-air and air-to-surface combat. Air engagements are handled by the heat-seeking Sidewinder and the radar guided AMRAAM missiles along with the M61 Vulcan cannon for close range dogfighting. For surface strikes, navy aircraft use a combination of missiles, smart bombs, and dumb bombs. On the list of available missiles are the Maverick, SLAM-ER and JSOW. Smart bombs include the GPS-guided JDAM and the laser-guided Paveway series. Unguided munitions such as dumb bombs and cluster bombs make up the rest of the weapons deployed by fixed-wing aircraft.

Rotary aircraft weapons are focused on anti-submarine warfare (ASW) and light to medium surface engagements. To combat submarines, helicopters use Mark 46 and Mark 54 torpedoes. Against small watercraft, they use AGM-114 Hellfire and Penguin air to surface missiles. Helicopters also employ various types of mounted anti-personnel machine guns, including the M60, M240, GAU-16/A, and GAU-17/A.

Nuclear weapons in the U.S. Navy arsenal are deployed through ballistic missile submarines and aircraft. The Ohio-class submarine carries the latest iteration of the Trident missile, a three-stage, submarine-launched ballistic missile (SLBM) with MIRV capability; the current Trident II (D5) version is expected to be in service past 2020. The navy's other nuclear weapon is the air-deployed B61 nuclear bomb. The B61 is a thermonuclear device that can be dropped by strike aircraft such as the F/A-18 Hornet and Super Hornet at high speed from a large range of altitudes. It can be released through free-fall or parachute and can be set to detonate in the air or on the ground.

== Naval jack ==
U.S. naval jack

First navy jack

The current naval jack of the United States is the Union Jack, a small blue flag emblazoned with the stars of the 50 states. The Union Jack was not flown for the duration of the war on terror, during which Secretary of the Navy Gordon R. England directed all U.S. naval ships to fly the First Navy Jack. While Secretary England directed the change on 31 May 2002, many ships chose to shift colors later that year in remembrance of the first anniversary of the September 11, 2001, attacks. The Union Jack, however, remained in use with vessels of the U.S. Coast Guard and National Oceanic and Atmospheric Administration. A jack of similar design to the Union Jack was used in 1794, with 13 stars arranged in a 3–2–3–2–3 pattern. When a ship is moored or anchored, the jack is flown from the bow of the ship while the ensign is flown from the stern. When underway, the ensign is raised on the mainmast. Before the decision for all ships to fly the First Navy Jack, it was flown only on the oldest ship in the active American fleet, which is currently USS Blue Ridge. U.S. Navy ships and craft returned to flying the Union Jack effective 4 June 2019. The date for reintroduction of the jack commemorates the Battle of Midway, which began on 4 June 1942.

== Notable sailors ==
Many past and present United States historical figures have served in the U.S. Navy.

=== Officers ===
Notable officers include:

- John P. Jones
- John Barry (Continental Navy officer and first flag officer of the United States Navy),
- Edward Preble
- James Lawrence (whose last words "don't give up the ship" are memorialized in Bancroft Hall at the United States Naval Academy)
- Stephen Decatur Jr., David Farragut, David D. Porter, Oliver H. Perry,
- Commodore Matthew C. Perry (who, under the direction of President Millard Fillmore, forced the opening of Japan)
- George Dewey (the only person in U.S. history to have attained the rank of Admiral of the Navy)
- William D. Leahy
- Ernest J. King
- Chester W. Nimitz
- William F. Halsey Jr.

=== Presidents ===
The first American President who served in the U.S. Navy was John F. Kennedy (who commanded the famous PT-109 in World War II); he was then followed by Lyndon B. Johnson, Richard Nixon, Gerald Ford, Jimmy Carter, and George H. W. Bush.

=== Government officials ===
Some notable former members of the Navy include U.S. Senators, Bob Kerrey, John McCain, and John Kerry, along with Ron DeSantis, Governor of Florida, and Jesse Ventura, Governor of Minnesota.

=== Others ===
Notable former members of the U.S. Navy include; astronauts (Alan B. Shepard, Walter M. Schirra, Neil Armstrong, John Young, Michael J. Smith, Scott Kelly), entertainers (Johnny Carson, Mike Douglas, Paul Newman, Robert Stack, Humphrey Bogart, Tony Curtis, Jack Lemmon, Jack Benny, Don Rickles, Ernest Borgnine, Harry Belafonte, Henry Fonda, Fred Gwynne), authors (Robert Heinlein, Marcus Luttrell, Thomas Pynchon, Brandon Webb), musicians, (John Philip Sousa, MC Hammer, John Coltrane, Zach Bryan, Fred Durst), professional athletes (David Robinson, Bill Sharman, Roger Staubach, Joe Bellino, Bob Kuberski, Nile Kinnick, Bob Feller, Yogi Berra, Larry Doby, Stan Musial, Pee Wee Reese, Phil Rizzuto, Jack Taylor), business people (John S. Barry, Jack C. Taylor, Paul A. Sperry), and computer scientists (Grace Hopper).

== Naval post offices ==
During World War I the first U.S. government post offices were established aboard Navy ships, managed by a Navy postal clerk. Prior to this, mail from crew members was collected and at the first opportunity was dropped off at a port of call where it was processed at a US Post Office. Before the arrival of email and the internet, hand stamped mail was the only way Navy crew members at sea could communicate with their family, friends and others. Mail was considered almost as valuable to crew members as food and ammunition. Sometimes mail from various crew members (referred to by historians and collectors as postal history), is directly associated with naval history. Letters and other correspondence sent by commanders, officers and crew members can include names, ranks, signatures, addresses, and ship's postmarks which can often confirm dates and locations of naval ships and crew members during various battles or other naval operations. As such, naval mail can serve as a source of information to naval historians and biographers. Among the more notable examples of Naval postal history include letters sent from the USS Arizona, before and on 7 December 1941.

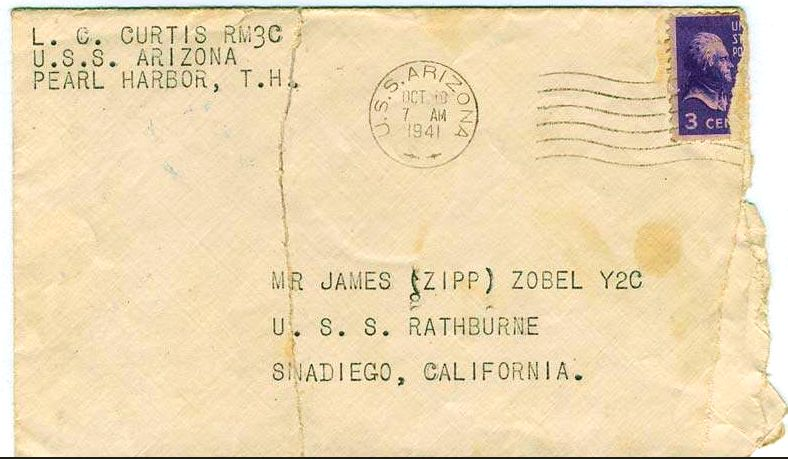
Cover mailed from USS Arizona, 10 October 1941, 58 days before the attack on Pearl Harbor

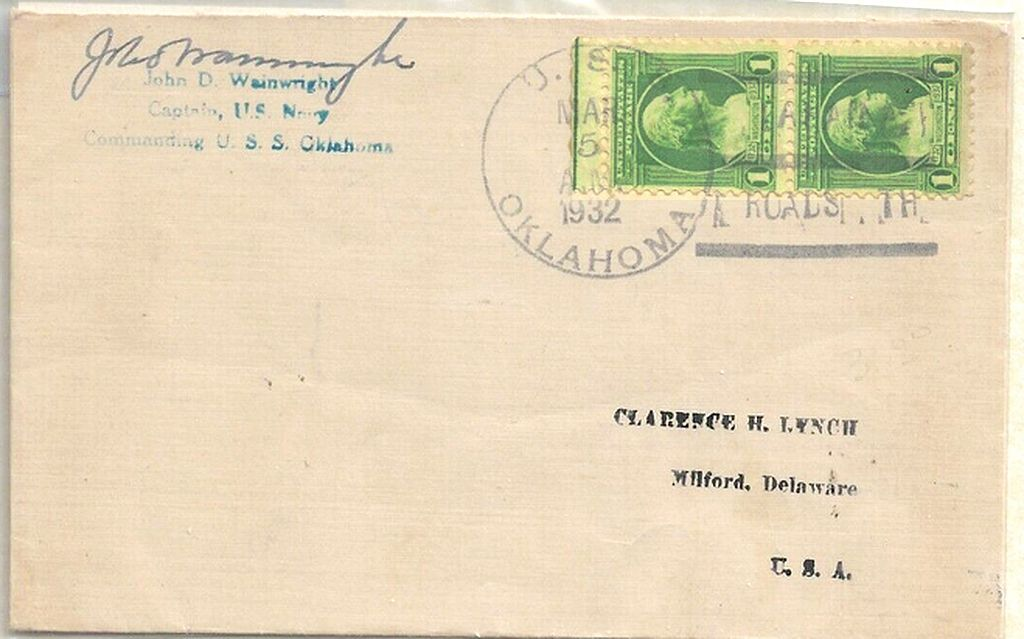
Cover mailed from USS Oklahoma, signed by Admiral John Wainwright, US Navy, postmarked 5 March 1932

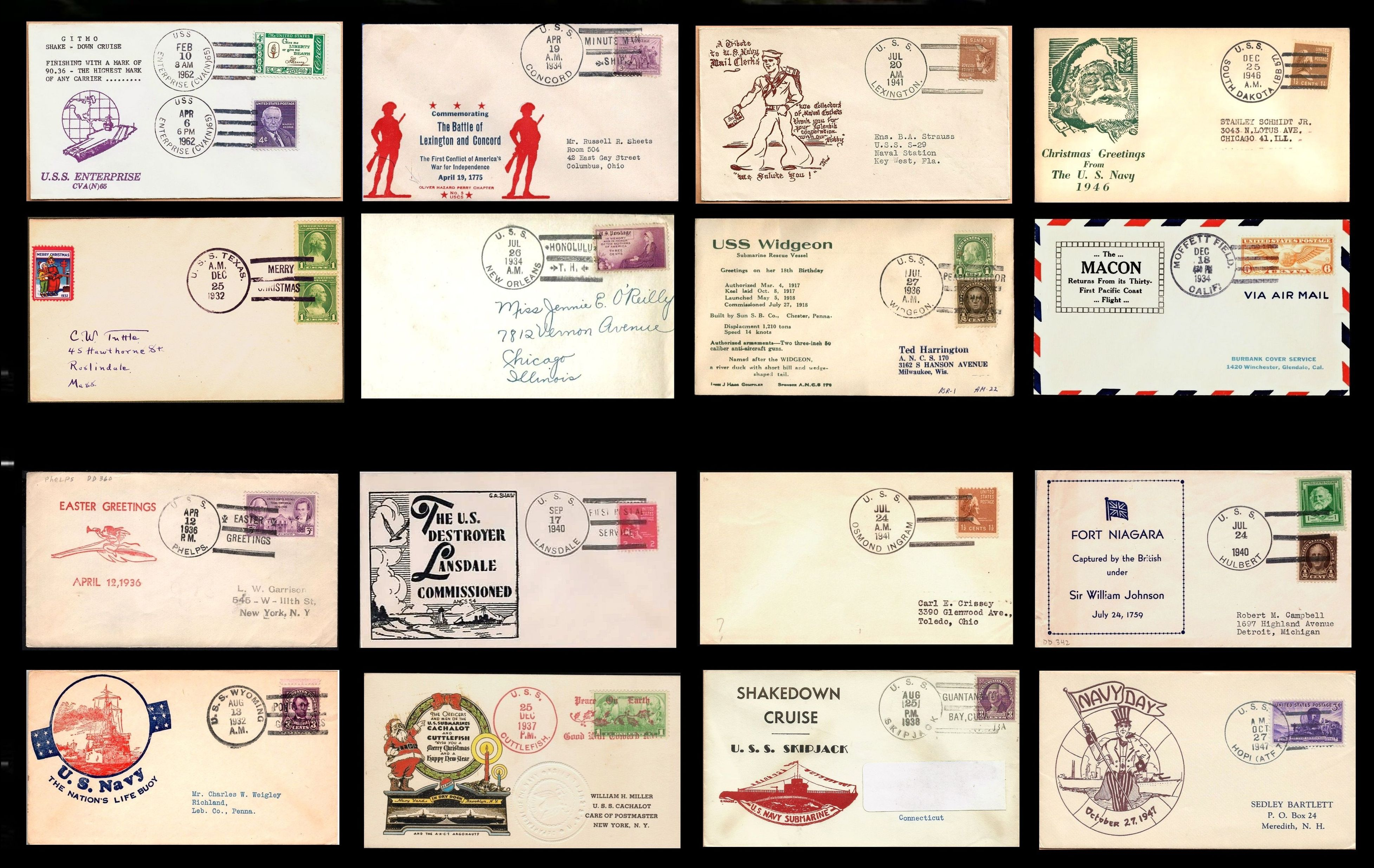
There is a US naval post office aboard nearly every US Navy ship, each with its own postal officer and postmark bearing the ship's name.

== See also ==
- Bibliography of early United States naval history
- List of undesignated military aircraft of the United States
- List of United States Navy aircraft designations (pre-1962)
- List of United States Navy ships
- Lists of military aircraft of the United States
- Modern United States Navy carrier air operations
- Naval militia
- Spearhead-class expeditionary fast transport
- Women in the United States Navy

== Sources ==
- "Navy aircraft inventory by type U.S. 2024". Statista. Archived from the original on 7 November 2023.
- "Navy Raises Battle Force Goal to 381 Ships in Classified Report to Congress". United States Naval Institute. 18 July 2023. Archived from the original on 15 November 2023.
- "Responsibilities". Chief of Naval Operations. United States Navy. Archived from the original on 24 June 2013.
- "America's Navy". navy.com. Archived from the original on 24 June 2019.
- Miller, Rick (29 April 2021). "Modern Military Postal History". Linn's Stamp News.
- "USS Arizona Postal Cover - December 7, 1941 KIA". Ephemera, Photographs & Military Artwork. 7 December 1941.
- "1941 letter from a USS Arizona crewman". Ephemera, Photographs & Military Artwork. 7 December 1941.
- Graham, Richard B (1992). United States Postal History, sampler. Sidney, Ohio: Linn's Stamp News. p. 125. ISBN 978-0-94040-3307.
