= 1849 Naval Air Squadron =

Inactive flying squadron of the Royal Navy's Fleet Air Arm

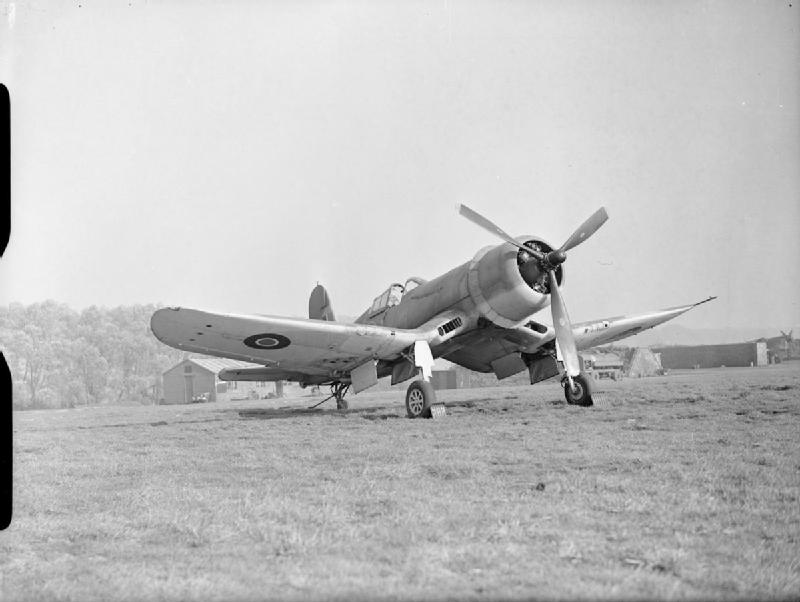
- Vought Corsair; an example of the type used by 1849 NAS
- Active: 1944
- Disbanded: 6 December 1944
- Country: United Kingdom
- Branch: Royal Navy
- Type: Single-seat fighter squadron
- Role: Fighter squadron
- Size: Eighteen aircraft
- Part of: Fleet Air Arm
- Home station: See Naval air stations section for full list.

Insignia
- Identification Markings: 1+ V11 individual letters

Aircraft flown
- Fighter: Vought Corsair

1849 Naval Air Squadron (1849 NAS) was a Fleet Air Arm (FAA) naval air squadron of the United Kingdom's Royal Navy (RN). It formed in the United States at RN Air Section Brunswick as a fighter squadron at the start of 1944, equipped with Vought Corsair fighter aircraft. It embarked in HMS Reaper for transport to the UK in November. The squadron suffered from a high accident rate and disbanded on arrival in the UK, in December, with its aircraft and personnel dispersed between 1845 and 1850 Naval Air Squadrons.

== History ==
=== Single-seat fighter squadron (1944) ===
1849 Naval Air Squadron formed on 1 August 1944 in the United States at RN Air Section Brunswick, which was located at United States Naval Air Station (USNAS) Brunswick, Maine, as a Single Seat Fighter Squadron, under the command of Lieutenant Commander(A) P.C.S. Chilton, RN.

It was equipped with eighteen Vought Corsair aircraft, an American carrier-borne fighter-bomber. These were the Brewster built F4U-1 variant, designated Corsair Mk III by the Fleet Air Arm. Training involved formation flying, air combat and navigation. Aerodrome Dummy Deck Landings (ADDLs) were undertaken at the nearby Bar Harbor Naval Auxiliary Air Facility (NAAF), Bar Harbor, Maine. 1849 Naval Air Squadron was the last Fleet Air Arm squadron to be equipped with the Mk III variant of Vought Corsair, but these were replaced on 24 October with the Goodyear built FG-1D variant, designated Vought Corsair Mk IV by the Fleet Air Arm.

With working up completed the squadron left RN Air Section Brunswick and flew to RN Air Section Floyd Bennett Field, located at USNAS Floyd Bennett Field, Brooklyn, New York City, on 15 November. Leaving the aircraft behind the aircrew travelled to Naval Station Norfolk to embarked in the ruler-class escort carrier, HMS Reaper. She sailed to New York City, where she embarked the squadron aircraft and joined Convoy CU.48 for the Atlantic crossing to the United Kingdom on 24 November. On 6 December the squadron disembarked to Royal Naval Air Maintenance Yard Belfast (HMS Gadwall).

With the large amount of losses from air accidents it was decided 1849 Naval Air Squadron would be disbanded on arrival in the United Kingdom. The aircraft and personnel were distributed between 1845 and 1850 Naval Air Squadrons. 1849 Naval Air Squadron disbanded on 6 December 1944.

== Aircraft flown ==
1849 Naval Air Squadron flew two variants of only one aircraft type:

- Vought Corsair Mk III fighter bomber (August - October 1944)
- Vought Corsair Mk IV fighter bomber (October - December 1944)

== Naval air stations ==
1849 Naval Air Squadron operated from a number of naval air stations of the Royal Navy overseas, and a Royal Navy escort carrier:

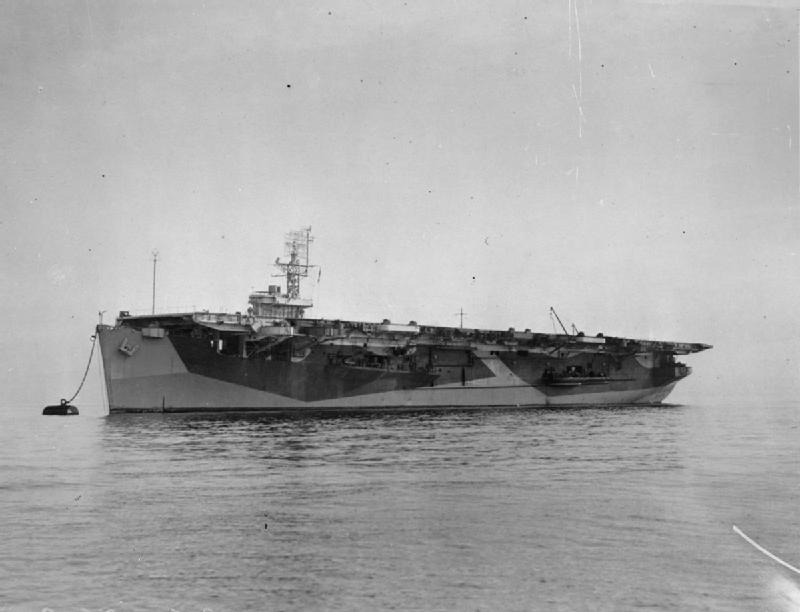
HMS Reaper

- RN Air Section Brunswick, Maine, (1 August - 7 October 1944)
  - RN Air Section Norfolk, Virginia, (Detachment Deck Landing Training (DLT) USS Charger 2 October 1944)
- RN Air Section Floyd Bennett Field, Brooklyn, New York, (7 - 10 October 1944)
- RN Air Section Brunswick, Maine, (10 - 23 October 1944)
- RN Air Section Norfolk, Virginia, (23 - 24 October 1944)
- RN Air Section Brunswick, Maine, (24 October - 15 November 1944)
- RN Air Section Floyd Bennett Field, Brooklyn, New York, (15 - 17 November 1944)
- RN Air Section Norfolk, Virginia, (17 - 22 November 1944)
- HMS Reaper (22 November - 6 December 1944)
- disbanded - UK (6 December 1944)

== Commanding officers ==
List of commanding officers of 1849 Naval Air Squadron with date of appointment:

- Lieutenant Commander(A) P.C.S. Chilton, RN, from 1 August 1944
- disbanded - 12 December 1946

Note: Abbreviation (A) signifies Air Branch of the RN or RNVR.
