= USS Wasp (CV-18) =

Essex-class aircraft carrier of the US Navy

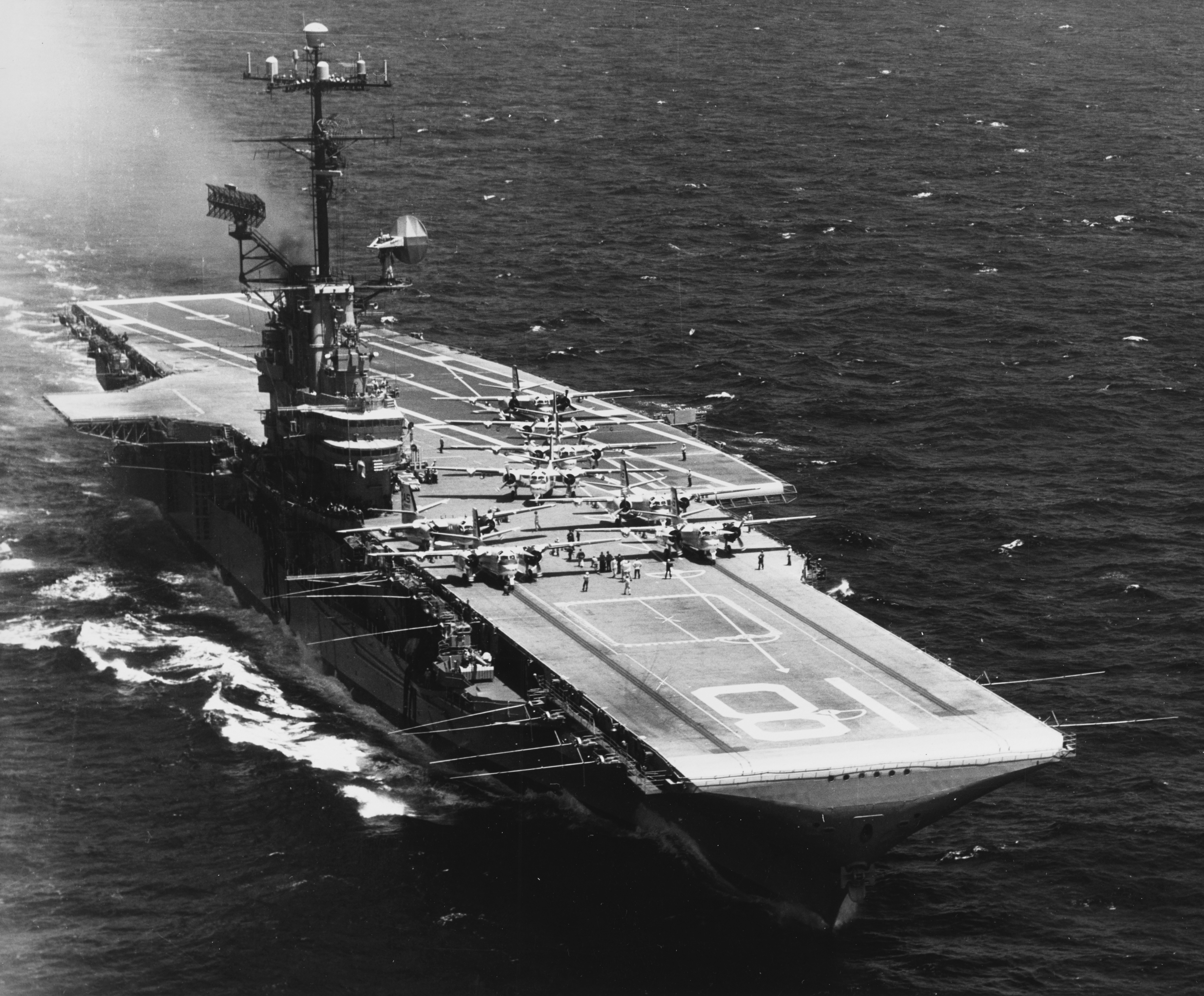
- USS Wasp underway in 1967

History

United States
- Name: Wasp
- Namesake: Wasp; USS Wasp (CV-7)
- Builder: Fore River Shipyard
- Laid down: 18 March 1942
- Launched: 17 August 1943
- Commissioned: 24 November 1943
- Decommissioned: 17 February 1947
- Recommissioned: 28 September 1951
- Decommissioned: 1 July 1972
- Reclassified: CVA-18, 1 October 1952; CVS-18, 1 November 1956
- Stricken: 1 July 1972
- Fate: Scrapped, 1973

General characteristics
- Class & type: Essex-class aircraft carrier
- Displacement: 27,100 long tons (27,500 t) (standard); 36,380 long tons (36,960 t) (full load)
- Length: 820 feet (249.9 m) (wl); 872 feet (265.8 m) (o/a)
- Beam: 93 ft (28.3 m)
- Draft: 34 ft 2 in (10.41 m)
- Installed power: 8 × Babcock & Wilcox boilers; 150,000 shp (110,000 kW)
- Propulsion: 4 × geared steam turbines; 4 × screw propellers
- Speed: 33 knots (61 km/h; 38 mph)
- Range: 14,100 nmi (26,100 km; 16,200 mi) at 20 knots (37 km/h; 23 mph)
- Complement: 2,600 officers and enlisted men
- Armament: 12 × 5 in (127 mm) DP guns; 32 × 40 mm (1.6 in) AA guns; 46 × 20 mm (0.8 in) AA guns
- Armor: Waterline belt: 2.5–4 in (64–102 mm); Deck: 1.5 in (38 mm); Hangar deck: 2.5 in (64 mm); Bulkheads: 4 in (100 mm)
- Aircraft carried: 36 × Grumman F4F Wildcat; 36 × Douglas SBD Dauntless; 18 × Grumman TBF Avenger

USS Wasp (CV/CVA/CVS-18) was one of 24 Essex-class aircraft carriers built during World War II for the United States Navy. The ship, the ninth US Navy ship to bear the name, was originally named Oriskany, but was renamed while under construction in honor of the previous Wasp (CV-7), which was sunk 15 September 1942. Wasp was commissioned in November 1943, and served in several campaigns in the Pacific Theater of Operations, earning eight battle stars. Like many of her sister ships, she was decommissioned shortly after the end of the war, but was modernized and recommissioned in the early 1950s as an attack carrier (CVA), and then eventually became an antisubmarine carrier (CVS). In her second career, she operated mainly in the Atlantic, Mediterranean, and Caribbean. She played a prominent role in the manned space program, serving as the recovery ship for five Project Gemini missions: Gemini IV, Gemini VI, Gemini VII, Gemini IX, and Gemini XII. She was retired in 1972, and sold for scrap in 1973.

== Construction and commissioning ==
The ship was laid down as Oriskany on 18 March 1942 at Quincy, Massachusetts, by the Bethlehem Steel Company, and renamed Wasp on 13 November 1942, shortly after the sinking of the previous Wasp. She was launched on 17 August 1943, sponsored by Miss Julia M. Walsh, the sister of Senator David I. Walsh of Massachusetts, and commissioned on 24 November 1943, with Captain Clifton A. F. Sprague in command.

== Service history ==
=== World War II ===
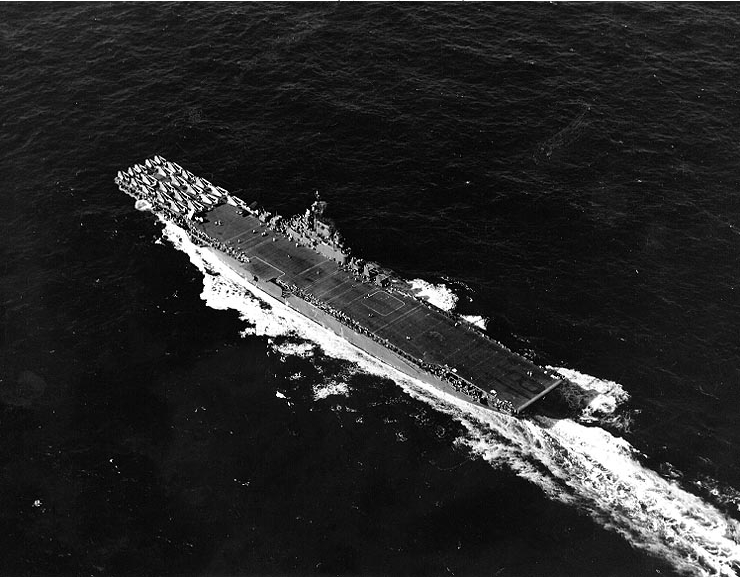
Wasp underway, 22 February 1944

Following a shakedown cruise which lasted through the end of 1943, Wasp returned to Boston for a brief yard period to correct minor flaws which had been discovered during her time at sea. On 10 January 1944, the new aircraft carrier departed Boston, steamed to Hampton Roads, Virginia, and remained there until the last day of the month, when she sailed for Trinidad, her base of operations through 22 February. She returned to Boston five days later and prepared for service in the Pacific. Early in March, the ship sailed south, transited the Panama Canal, arrived at San Diego on 21 March, and reached Pearl Harbor on 4 April.

Following training exercises in Hawaiian waters, Wasp steamed to the Marshall Islands and at Majuro, Rear Admiral Alfred E. Montgomery's newly formed Task Group 58.6 (TG 58.6) of Vice Admiral Marc A. Mitscher's Fast Carrier Task Force (TF 58). On 14 May, she and her sister carriers of TG 58.6, Essex and the light aircraft carrier San Jacinto, sortied for raids on Marcus and Wake Islands to give the new task group combat experience, to test a recently devised system of assigning—before takeoff—each pilot a specific target, and to neutralize those islands for the forthcoming Marianas Campaign. As the force neared Marcus, it split, sending San Jacinto north to search for Japanese picket boats while Wasp and Essex launched strikes on 19 and 20 May, aimed at installations on the island. American planes encountered heavy antiaircraft fire but still managed to do enough damage to prevent Japanese forces on the island from interfering with the impending assault on Saipan.

When weather cancelled launches planned for 21 May, the two carriers rejoined San Jacinto and steamed to Wake. Planes from all three carriers pounded that island on 24 May and were sufficiently effective to neutralize that base. However, the system of selecting targets for each plane fell short of the Navy's expectations, and thereafter, tactical air commanders resumed responsibility for directing the attacks of their planes.

==== The Mariana and Palau Islands ====
After the strike on Wake, TG 58.6 returned to Majuro to prepare for the Marianas campaign. On 6 June, Wasp—reassigned to TG 58.2 which was also commanded by Rear Admiral Montgomery—sortied for the invasion of Saipan. During the afternoon of 11 June, she and her sister carriers launched fighters for strikes against Japanese air bases on Saipan and Tinian. They were challenged by some 30 land-based fighters, which they promptly shot down. Antiaircraft fire was heavy, but the American planes braved it as they went on to destroy many of the Japanese aircraft still on the ground. During the next three days, the American fighters—now joined by bombers—pounded installations on Saipan to soften up Japanese defenses for American assault troops who would go ashore on 15 June. That day and thereafter until the morning of June, planes from TGs 58.2 and TG 58.3 provided close air support for Marines fighting on the Saipan beachhead. The fast carriers of those task groups then turned over to escort carriers responsibility for providing air support for the American ground forces, refueled, and steamed to meet with TGs 58.1 and 58.4, which were returning from strikes against Chichi and Iwo Jima to prevent Japanese air bases on those islands from being used to launch attacks against American forces on or near Saipan.

===== Battle of the Philippine Sea =====
Meanwhile, Japan—determined to defend Saipan, no matter how high the cost—was sending Admiral Jisaburō Ozawa's powerful First Mobile Fleet from the Sulu Islands to the Marianas to sink the warships of Admiral Raymond A. Spruance's 5th Fleet and to annihilate the American troops who had fought their way ashore on Saipan. Soon after the Japanese task force sortied from Tawi Tawi on the morning of 13 June, American submarine Redfin spotted and reported it. Other submarines—which from time to time made contact with Ozawa's warships—kept Spruance posted on their progress as they wended their way through the islands of the Philippines, transited San Bernardino Strait, and took part in the Battle of the Philippine Sea. All day on 18 June 1944, each force sent out scout planes in an effort to locate its adversary. Because of their greater range, the Japanese aircraft managed to obtain some knowledge of Spruance's ships, but American scout planes were unable to find Ozawa's force. Early the following morning, 19 June, aircraft from Mitscher's carriers headed for Guam to neutralize that island for the coming battle and in a series of dogfights, destroyed many Japanese land-based planes.

During the morning, carriers from Ozawa's fleet launched four massive raids against their American counterparts, but all were thwarted almost completely. Nearly all of the Japanese warplanes were shot down while failing to sink a single American ship. They did manage to score a single bomb hit on South Dakota, but that solitary success did not put the battleship out of action. That day, Mitscher's planes did not find the Japanese ships, but American submarines succeeded in sending two enemy carriers (Taihō and Shōkaku) to the bottom. In the evening, three of Mitscher's four carrier task groups headed west in search of Ozawa's retiring fleet, leaving only TG 58.4 and a gun line of old battleships in the immediate vicinity of the Marianas to cover ground forces on Saipan. Planes from the American carriers failed to find the Japanese force until mid-afternoon on the 20th when an Avenger pilot reported spotting Ozawa almost 300 mi ( km) from the American carriers. Mitscher daringly ordered an all-out strike even though he knew that night would descend before his planes could return.

Over two hours later, the American aviators caught up with their quarry. They damaged two oilers so severely that they had to be scuttled; sank carrier Hiyō, and scored damaging but non-lethal hits on carriers Ryuho, Junyō, Zuikaku, and several other Japanese ships. However, during the sunset attack, the fuel gauges in many of the American planes registered half empty or more, presaging an anxious flight back to their now distant carriers. When the carriers spotted the first returning plane at 2030 that night, Rear Admiral J. J. Clark defied the menace of Japanese submarines by ordering all lights to be turned on to guide the weary fliers home. After a plane from Hornet landed on Lexington, Mitscher gave pilots permission to land on any available deck. Despite these unusual efforts to help the Navy's airmen, a good many planes ran out of fuel before they reached the carriers and dropped into the water.

When fuel calculations indicated that no aircraft which had not returned could still be aloft, Mitscher ordered the carriers to reverse course and resume the stern chase of Ozawa's surviving ships—more in the hope of finding any downed fliers who might still be alive and pulling them from the sea than in the expectation of overtaking Japan's First Mobile Fleet before it reached the protection of the Emperor's land-based planes. During the chase, Mitscher's ships picked up 36 pilots and 26 crewmen. At midmorning of 21 June, Admiral Spruance detached Wasp and Bunker Hill from their task group and sent them with Admiral Lee's battleships in Ozawa's wake to locate and destroy any crippled enemy ships. The ensuing two-day hunt failed to flush out any game, so this ad hoc force headed toward Eniwetok for replenishment and well-earned rest.

===== Subsequent operations =====
The respite was brief, for on 30 June, Wasp sortied in TG 58.2—with TG 58.1—for strikes at Iwo Jima and Chichi Jima. Planes from the carriers pounded those islands on 3–4 July and, during the raids, destroyed 75 enemy aircraft, for the most part in the air. Then, as a grand finale, cruisers from the force's screen shelled Iwo Jima for two and one-half hours. The next day, 5 July, the two task groups returned to the Marianas and attacked Guam and Rota to begin more than a fortnight's effort to soften the Japanese defenses there in preparation for landings on Guam. Planes from Wasp and her sister carriers provided close air support for the marines and soldiers who stormed ashore on 21 July. The next day, TG 58.2 sortied with two other groups of Mitscher's carriers headed southwest toward the Western Carolines, and launched raids against the Palaus on the 25th. The force then parted, with TGs 58.1 and 58.3 steaming back north for further raids to keep the Bonin and Volcano Islands neutralized while Wasp in TG 58.2 was retiring toward the Marshalls for replenishment at Eniwetok which she reached on 2 August.

Toward the end of Wasp's stay at that base, Admiral Halsey relieved Admiral Spruance on 26 August and the 5th Fleet became the 3rd Fleet. Two days later, the Fast Carrier Task Force—redesignated TF 38—sortied for the Palaus. On 6 September, Wasp, now assigned to Vice Admiral John S. McCain, Sr.'s TG 38.1, began three days of raids on the Palaus. On 9 September, she headed for the southern Philippines to neutralize air power there during the American conquest of Morotai, Peleliu, and Ulithi—three islands needed as advanced bases during the impending campaign to liberate the Philippines. Planes from these carriers encountered little resistance as they lashed Mindanao airfields that day and on 10 September. Raids against the Visayan Islands on 12 and 13 September were carried out with impunity and were equally successful. Learning of the lack of Japanese air defenses in the southern Philippines enabled Allied strategists to cancel an invasion of Mindanao which had been scheduled to begin on 16 November. Instead, Allied forces could go straight to Leyte and advance the recapture of Philippine soil by almost a month. D-day in the Palaus, 15 September, found Wasp and TG 38.1 some 50 mi (80 km) off Morotai, launching air strikes. It then returned to the Philippines for revisits to Mindanao and the Visayas before retiring to the Admiralties on 29 September for replenishment at Manus in preparation for the liberation of the Philippines.

==== Philippines campaign ====
Ready to resume battle, she got underway again on 4 October and steamed to the Philippine Sea, where TF 38 reassembled at twilight on the evening of 7 October, some 375 mi (604 km) west of the Marianas. Its mission was to neutralize airbases within operational air distance of the Philippines to keep Japanese warplanes out of the air during the American landings on Leyte scheduled to begin on 20 October. The carriers steamed north to meet with a group of nine oilers, and spent the next day, 8 October, refueling. They then followed a generally northwesterly course toward the Ryūkyūs until 10 October, when their planes raided Okinawa, Amami, and Miyaki. That day, TF 38 planes destroyed a Japanese submarine tender, 12 sampans, and over 100 planes. But for Lieutenant Colonel Doolittle's Tokyo raid from Hornet (CV-8) on 18 April 1942 and the daring war patrols of Pacific Fleet submarines, this carrier foray was the United States Navy's closest approach to the Japanese home islands up to that point in the war.

Beginning on 12 October, Formosa received three days of unwelcome attention from TF 38 planes. In response, the Japanese Navy made an all-out effort to protect that strategic island, though doing so meant denuding its remaining carriers of aircraft. Yet, the attempt to thwart the ever-advancing American Pacific Fleet was futile. At the end of a three-day air battle, Japan had lost more than 500 planes and 20-odd freighters. Many other merchant ships were damaged as were hangars, barracks, warehouses, industrial plants, and ammunition dumps. However, the victory was costly to the United States Navy, for TF 38 lost 79 planes and 64 pilots and air crewmen, while cruisers Canberra and Houston and carrier Franklin received damaging, but nonlethal, torpedo and bomb hits.

From Formosa, TF 38 shifted its attention to the Philippines. After steaming to waters east of Luzon, TG 58.1 began to launch strikes against that island on the 18th and continued the attack the following day, hitting Manila for the first time since it was occupied by the Japanese early in the war. On 20 October, the day the first American troops waded ashore on Leyte, Wasp had moved south to the station off that island whence she and her sister carriers launched some planes for close air support missions to assist MacArthur's soldiers, while sending other aircraft to destroy airfields on Mindanao, Cebu, Negros, Panay, and Leyte. TG 38.1 refueled the following day and, on 22 October, set a course for Ulithi to rearm and provision.

===== Battle of Leyte Gulf =====
While McCain's carriers were steaming away from the Philippines, great events were taking place in the waters of that archipelago. Admiral Soemu Toyoda, the commander in chief of Japan's Combined Fleet, activated plan Sho-Go-1, a scheme for bringing about a decisive naval action off Leyte, the Battle of Leyte Gulf. The Japanese strategy called for Ozawa's carriers to act as a decoy to lure TF 38 north of Luzon and away from the Leyte beachhead. Then—with the American fast carriers out of the way—heavy Japanese surface ships were to debouch into Leyte Gulf from two directions: from the south through Surigao Strait and from the north through San Bernardino Strait. During much of 24 October, planes from Halsey's carrier task groups still in Philippine waters pounded Admiral Kurita's powerful Force "A", or Center Force, as it steamed across the Sibuyan Sea toward San Bernardino Strait. When darkness stopped their attack, the American aircraft had sunk superbattleship Musashi and had damaged several other Japanese warships. Moreover, Halsey's pilots reported that Kurita's force had reversed course and was moving away from San Bernardino Strait.

That night, Admiral Nishimura's Force "C", or Southern Force, attempted to transit Surigao Strait, but met a line of old battleships commanded by Rear Admiral Jesse B. Oldendorf. The venerable American men-of-war crossed Nishimura's "T" and all but annihilated his force. Admiral Shima—who was following in Nishimura's wake to lend support—realized that disaster had struck and wisely withdrew. Meanwhile, late in the afternoon of 24 October—after Kurita's Center Force had turned away from San Bernardino Strait in apparent retreat—Halsey's scout planes finally located Ozawa's carriers less than 200 mi (320 km) north of TF 38. This intelligence prompted Halsey to head north toward Ozawa with his Fast Carrier Task Force. However, at this point, he did not recall McCain's TG 58.1, but allowed it to continue steaming toward Ulithi. After dark, Kurita's Center Force again reversed course and once more headed for San Bernardino Strait. About 30 minutes past midnight, it transited that narrow passage; turned to starboard; and steamed south, down the east coast of Samar. Since Halsey had dashed north in pursuit of Ozawa's carriers, only three 7th Fleet escort carrier groups and their destroyer and destroyer escort screens were available to challenge Kurita's mighty battleships and heavy cruisers and to protect the American amphibious ships which were supporting the troops fighting on Leyte.

Remembered by their call names, "Taffy 1", "Taffy 2", and "Taffy 3", these three American escort-carrier groups were deployed along Samar's east coast with Taffy 3 in the northernmost position, about 40 mi ( km) off Paninihian Point. Taffy 2 was covering Leyte Gulf, and "Taffy 1" was still farther south watching Surigao Strait. At 0645, lookouts on Taffy 3 ships spotted bursts of antiaircraft fire blossoming in the northern sky, as Center Force gunners opened fire on an American antisubmarine patrol plane. Moments later, Taffy 3 made both radar and visual contact with the approaching Japanese warships. Shortly before 0700, Kurita's guns opened fire on the hapless "baby flattops" and their comparatively tiny but incredibly courageous escorts. For more than two hours, Taffy 3's ships and planes—aided by aircraft from sister escort-carrier groups to the south—fought back with torpedoes, guns, bombs, and consummate seamanship. Then, at 0311, Kurita—shaken by the loss of three heavy cruisers and thinking that he had been fighting TF 38—ordered his remaining warships to break off the action.

Meanwhile, at 0848, Admiral Halsey had radioed McCain's TG 58.1—then refueling en route to Ulithi—calling that carrier group back to Philippine waters to help Taffy 3 in its fight for survival. Wasp and her consorts raced toward Samar at flank speed until 1030 when they began launching planes for strikes at Kurita's ships which were still some 330 miles away. While these raids did little damage to the Japanese Center Force, they did strengthen Kurita's decision to retire from Leyte. While his planes were in the air, McCain's carriers continued to speed westward to lessen the distance of his pilots' return flight and to be in optimum position at dawn to launch more warplanes at the fleeing enemy force. With the first light of 26 October, TG 38.1 and Rear Admiral Bogan's TG 38.2—which finally had been sent south by Halsey—launched the first of their strikes that day against Kurita. The second left the carriers a little over two hours later. These fliers sank light cruiser Noshiro and damaged, but did not sink, heavy cruiser Kumano. The two task groups launched a third strike in the early afternoon, but it did not add to their score.

===== Later operations =====
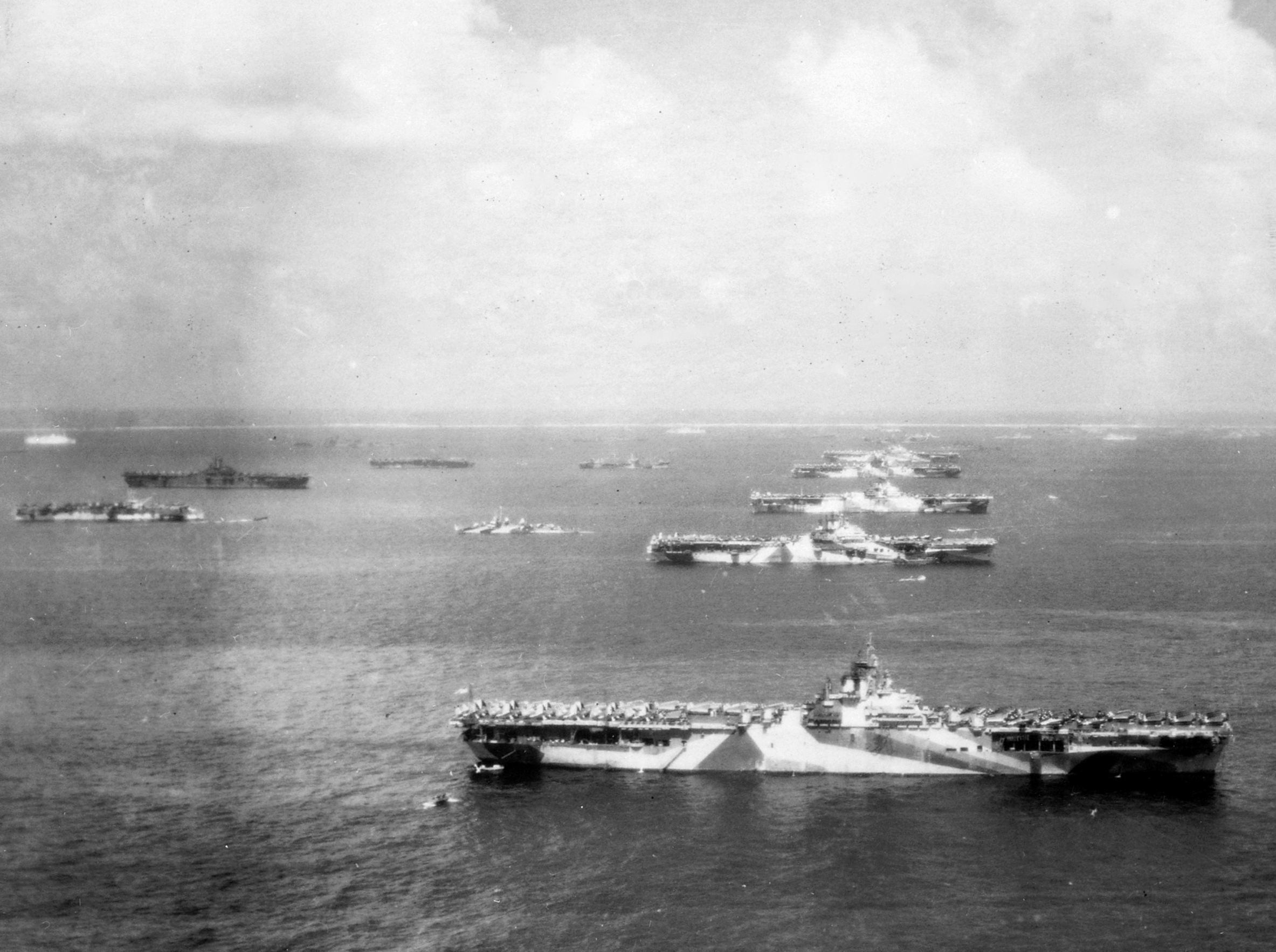
Wasp at Ulithi atoll on 8 December 1944

Following the Battle of Leyte Gulf, TG 38.1 operated in the Philippines for two more days, providing close air support before again heading for Ulithi on 28 October. However, the respite—during which Rear Admiral Montgomery took command of TG 38.1 when McCain fleeted up to relieve Mitscher as TF 38—was brief; Japanese land-based planes attacked troops on the Leyte beachhead on 1 November. Wasp participated in raids against Luzon air bases on 5 and 6 November, destroying over 400 Japanese aircraft, for the most part on the ground. A kamikaze hit Lexington during the operation. Afterwards, Wasp returned to Guam to exchange air groups.

Wasp returned to the Philippines a little before midmonth and continued to send strikes against targets in the Philippines until 26 November when the Army Air Forces assumed responsibility for providing air support for troops on Leyte. TF 38 then retired to Ulithi. There, the carriers received greater complements of fighter planes, and in late November and early December, conducted training exercises to prepare them better to deal with the new kamikaze threat.

TF 38 sortied from Ulithi on 10 and 11 December and proceeded to a position east of Luzon for round-the-clock strikes against air bases on that island from 14 through 16 December to prevent Japanese fighter planes from endangering landings on the southwest coast of Mindoro scheduled for 15 December. Then, while withdrawing to a fueling rendezvous point east of the Philippines, TF 38 was caught in a terribly destructive typhoon which battered its ships and sank three American destroyers. The carriers spent most of the ensuing week repairing storm damage and returned to Ulithi on Christmas Eve.

The accelerating tempo of the war, though, ruled out long repose in the shelter of the lagoon. Before the year ended, the carriers were back in action against airfields in the Philippines on Sakishima Gunto, and on Okinawa. These raids were intended to smooth the way for General MacArthur's invasion of Luzon through Lingayen Gulf. While the carrier planes were unable to knock out all Japanese air resistance to the Luzon landings, they did succeed in destroying many enemy planes, and thus reduced the air threat to manageable proportions.

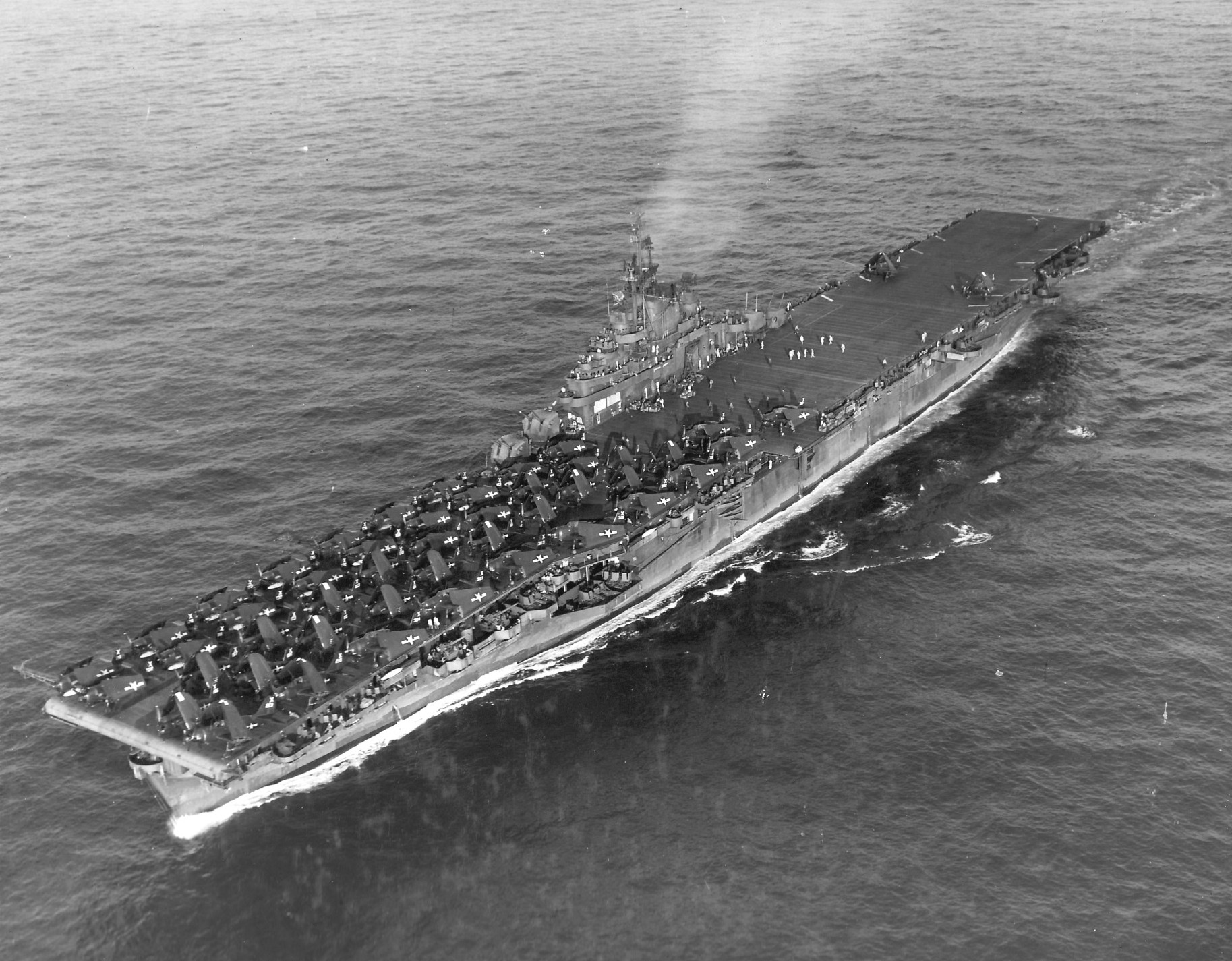
USS Wasp on 6 August 1945

On the night after the initial landings on Luzon, 9 January 1945, Halsey took TF 38 into the South China Sea for a week's rampage in which his ships and planes took a heavy toll of Japanese shipping and aircraft before they retransited Luzon Strait on 16 January and returned to the Philippine Sea. Bad weather prevented Halsey's planes from going aloft for the next few days, but on 21 January 1945, they bombed Formosa, the Pescadores, and the Sakishimas. The following day, the aircraft returned to the Sakishimas and the Ryūkyūs for more bombing and reconnaissance. The overworked Fast Carrier Task Force then headed for Ulithi and entered that lagoon on 26 January.

While the flattops were catching their breath at Ulithi, Admiral Spruance relieved Halsey in command of the fleet, which was thereby transformed from the 3rd to the 5th Fleet. The metamorphosis also entailed Mitscher's replacing McCain and Clark's resuming command of TG 58.1—still Wasp's task group.

==== Battle of Iwo Jima ====
The next major operation dictated by Allied strategy was the capture of Iwo Jima in the Volcano Islands. Iwo was needed as a base for fighter planes to escort B-29 Superfortress bombers from the Marianas attacking the Japanese home islands, and as an emergency landing point for crippled planes. TF 58 sortied on 10 February, held rehearsals at Tinian, and then headed for Japan. Fighter planes took off from the carriers before dawn on 16 February to clear the skies of Japanese aircraft. They succeeded in this mission, but Wasp lost several of her fighters during the sweep. Bombing sorties, directed primarily at aircraft factories in Tokyo, followed, but clouds hid many of these plants, forcing some planes to drop their bombs on secondary targets. Bad weather, which also hampered Mitscher's fliers during raids the next morning, prompted him to cancel strikes scheduled for the afternoon and head the task force west. During the night, Mitscher turned the carriers toward the Volcano Islands to be on hand to provide air support for the Marines who would land on beaches of Iwo Jima on the morning of 19 February.

For the next few days, planes from the American carriers continued to assist the Marines who were engaged in a bloody struggle to wrest the island from its fanatical defenders. On 23 February, Mitscher led his carriers back to Japan for more raids on Tokyo. Planes took off on the morning of 25 February, but when they reached Tokyo, they again found their targets obscured by clouds. Moreover, visibility was so bad the next day that raids on Nagoya were called off, and the carriers steamed south toward the Ryūkyūs to bomb and reconnoiter Okinawa, the next prize to be taken from the Japanese Empire. Planes left the carriers at dawn on 1 March, and throughout the day, they hammered and photographed the islands of the Ryūkyū group. Then, after a night bombardment by surface ships, TF 58 set a course for the Carolines and anchored in Ulithi lagoon on 4 March.

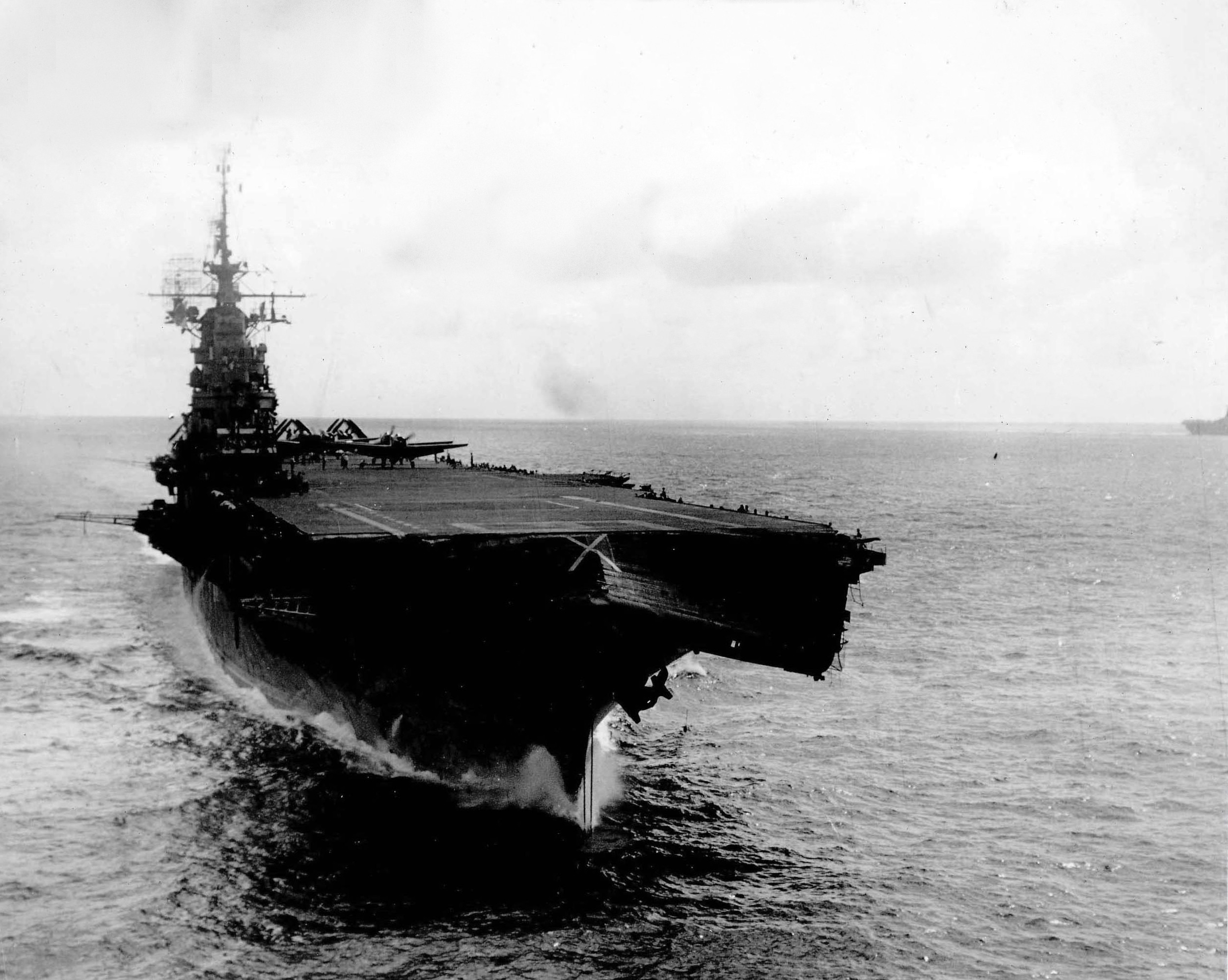
Wasp showing August 1945 typhoon damage

Damaged as she was, Wasp recorded—from 17 to 23 March—what was often referred to as the busiest week in flattop history. In these seven days, Wasp accounted for 14 enemy planes in the air, destroyed six more on the ground, scored two 500 pounds (230 kg) bomb hits on each of two Japanese carriers, dropped two 1,000 pounds (450 kg) bombs on a Japanese battleship, put one 1,000 lb bomb on another battleship, hit a heavy cruiser with three 500 lb missiles, dropped another 1,000 lb bomb on a big cargo ship, and heavily strafed "and probably sank" a large Japanese submarine. During this week, Wasp was under almost continuous attack by shore-based aircraft, and experienced several close kamikaze attacks. The carrier's gunners fired more than 10,000 rounds at the determined Japanese attackers.

In spite of valiant efforts of her gunners, on 19 March 1945, Wasp was hit with a 500-pound armor-piercing bomb. The bomb penetrated the flight deck and the armor-plated hangar deck, and exploded in the crew's galley. Many of her shipmates were having breakfast after being at general quarters all night. The blast disabled the number-four fire room. Around 102 crewmen were lost. Despite the losses, Wasp continued operations with the Task Group and the air group was carrying out flight operations 27 minutes after the damage.

==== End of the war ====
On 13 April 1945, Wasp returned to the Puget Sound Navy Yard, Bremerton, Washington, and had the damage caused by the bomb hit repaired. Once whole again, she steamed to Hawaii, and after a brief sojourn at Pearl Harbor, headed toward the western Pacific on 12 July 1945. Wasp conducted a strike at Wake Island and paused briefly at Eniwetok before rejoining the rampaging Fast Carrier Task Force. In a series of strikes, unique in the almost complete absence of enemy airborne planes, Wasp pilots struck Yokosuka Naval Base near Tokyo, numerous airfields, and hidden manufacturing centers. On 9 August, a kamikaze plane swooped down at the carrier, but an alert gunner, who was cleaning his gun at the time, started shooting at the airplane. He shot straight through the windshield and killed the pilot, but the plane kept on coming. Next, he shot off a wing of the airplane, causing it to veer off to the side, missing the ship.

Then, on 15 August, when the fighting should have been over, two Japanese planes tried to attack Wasp's task group. Fortunately, Wasp pilots were still flying on combat air patrol and sent both enemies smoking into the sea. This was the last time Wasp pilots and gunners were to tangle with the Japanese.

On 25 August 1945, a severe typhoon, with winds reaching 78 kn (144 km/h), engulfed Wasp and stove in about 30 ft (9.1 m) of her bow. The carrier, despite the hazardous job of flying from such a shortened deck, continued to launch her planes on missions of mercy or patrol as they carried food, medicine, and long-deserved luxuries to American prisoners of war at Narumi, near Nagoya.

The ship returned to Boston for Navy Day, 27 October 1945. On 30 October, Wasp moved to the naval shipyard in New York, to have extra accommodations installed for transportation of troops returning from the Pacific. This work was completed on 15 November and enabled her to accommodate some 5,500 enlisted passengers and 400 officers.

=== Post-war ===
==== 1947–1955 ====
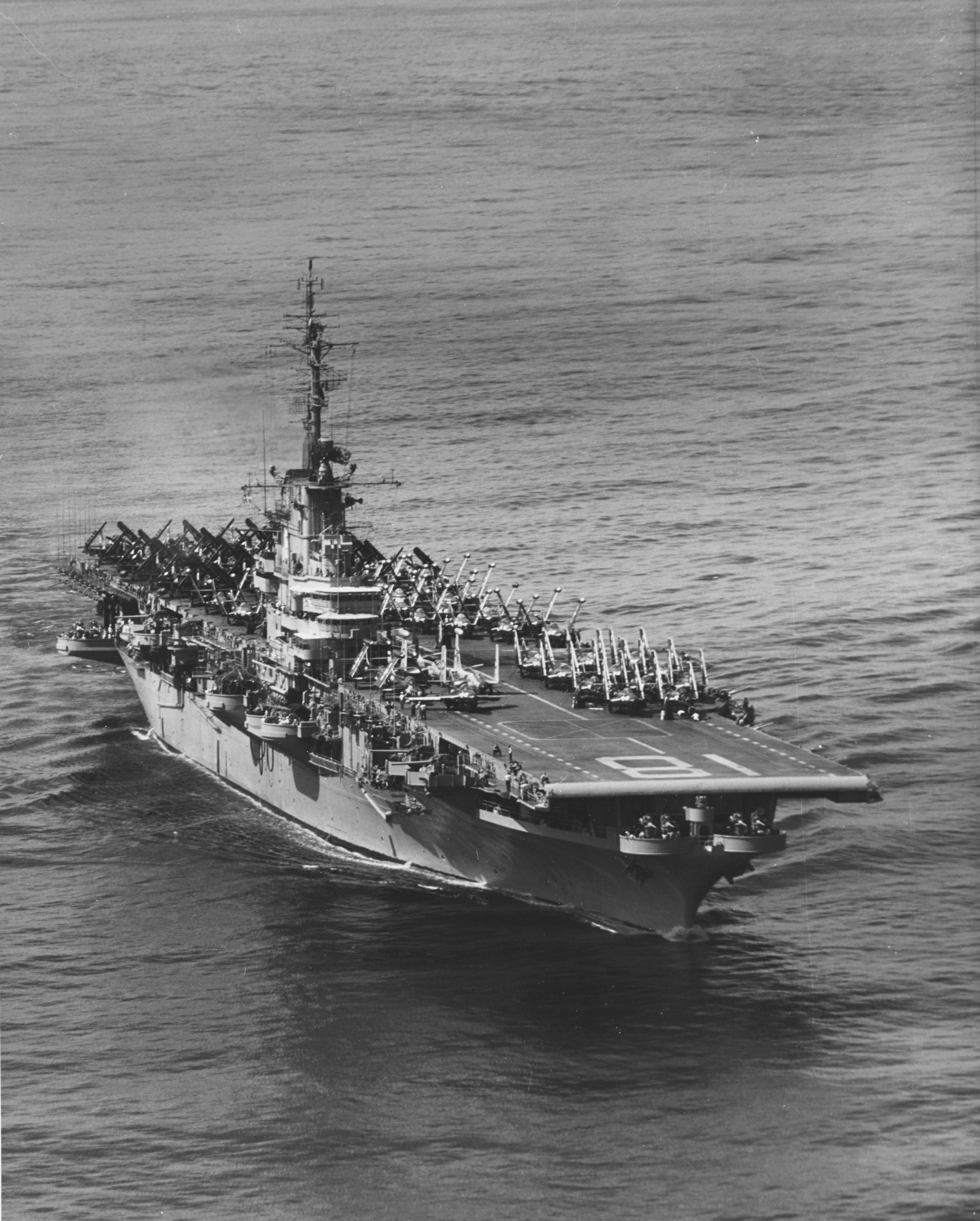
Wasp during her 1954 WESTPAC deployment, following her SCB-27 conversion

After receiving the new alterations, Wasp was assigned temporary duty as an Operation Magic Carpet troop transport, bringing Italian POWs back to Italy. On 17 February 1946, Wasp ran aground off the coast of New Jersey. On 17 February 1947, she was placed out of commission in reserve, attached to the Atlantic Reserve Fleet. In the summer of 1948, Wasp was taken out of the reserve fleet and placed in the New York Naval Shipyard for refitting and alterations to enable her to accommodate the larger, heavier, and faster planes of the jet age. Upon the completion of this conversion, the ship was recommissioned on 10 September 1951.

Wasp reported to the Atlantic Fleet in November 1951 and began a period of shakedown training which lasted until February 1952. After returning from the shakedown cruise, she spent a month in the New York Naval Shipyard preparing for duty in distant waters. On 26 April 1952, Wasp collided with destroyer minesweeper Hobson while conducting night flying operations en route to Gibraltar. Hobson lost 176 of the crew, including her skipper. Rapid rescue operations saved 52 men. Wasp sustained no personnel casualties, but her bow was torn by a 75-foot saw-tooth rip. The carrier proceeded to Bayonne, New Jersey, for repairs, and after she entered drydock there, the bow of aircraft carrier Hornet (CV-12)—then undergoing conversion—was removed and floated by barge from Brooklyn, New York, and fitted into position on Wasp, replacing the badly shattered forward end of the ship. This remarkable task was completed in only 10 days, enabling the carrier to get underway to cross the Atlantic.

On 2 June 1952, Wasp relieved Tarawa at Gibraltar and joined Carrier Division 6 in the Mediterranean Sea. After conducting strenuous flight operations between goodwill visits to many Mediterranean ports, Wasp was relieved at Gibraltar on 5 September by Leyte. After taking part in the NATO Exercise Mainbrace at Greenock, Scotland, and enjoying a liberty period at Plymouth, Wasp headed home and arrived at Norfolk early on the morning of 13 October 1952. On 7 November 1952, Wasp entered the New York Naval Shipyard to commence a seven-month yard period to prepare her for a world cruise which was to bring her into the Pacific Fleet once more. After refresher training in the Caribbean, Wasp departed Norfolk on 16 September 1953 to participate in the North Atlantic NATO Exercise "Mariner" before entering the Mediterranean.

After transiting the Suez Canal and crossing the Indian Ocean, making port in Columbo, Ceylon, the carrier made a brief visit to the Philippines and onto Japan and then conducted strenuous operations with the famed TF 77. While operating in the western Pacific, she made port calls at Hong Kong, Manila, Yokosuka, and Sasebo. On 10 January 1954, China's Generalissimo Chiang Kai-shek spent more than four hours on board Wasp watching simulated air war maneuvers in Formosan waters. On 12 March, President Ramon Magsaysay of the Republic of the Philippines came on board to observe air operations as a guest of American Ambassador Raymond A. Spruance. Wasp operated out of Subic Bay, Philippines, for a time, then sailed for Japan, where in April 1954, she was relieved by Boxer and sailed for her new home port of San Diego.

Wasp spent the next few months preparing for another tour of the Orient. She departed the United States in September 1954 and steamed to the Far East, visiting Pearl Harbor and Iwo Jima en route. She relieved Boxer in October 1954 and engaged in air operations in the South China Sea with Carrier Task Group 70.2. Wasp visited the Philippine Islands in November and December and proceeded to Japan early in 1955 to join TF77. While operating with TF77, Wasp provided air cover for the evacuation of the Tachen Islands by the Chinese Nationalists. During this evacuation on 9 February 1955, an AD-5W USN/VC-11 strayed over ROC territory and was shot down. While flying an antisubmarine patrol mission from Wasp (CVA 18), this aircraft ditched after sustaining damage from antiaircraft fire when it overflew Chinese territory. The three-man crew was rescued by Nationalist Chinese patrol boats. After the Tachen evacuation, Wasp stopped at Japan before returning to San Diego in April. She entered the San Francisco Naval Shipyard in May for a seven-month conversion and overhaul. On 1 December, the carrier returned to duty displaying a new angled flight deck and a hurricane bow. As 1955 ended, Wasp had returned to San Diego and was busily preparing for another Far Eastern tour.

==== 1956–1960 ====
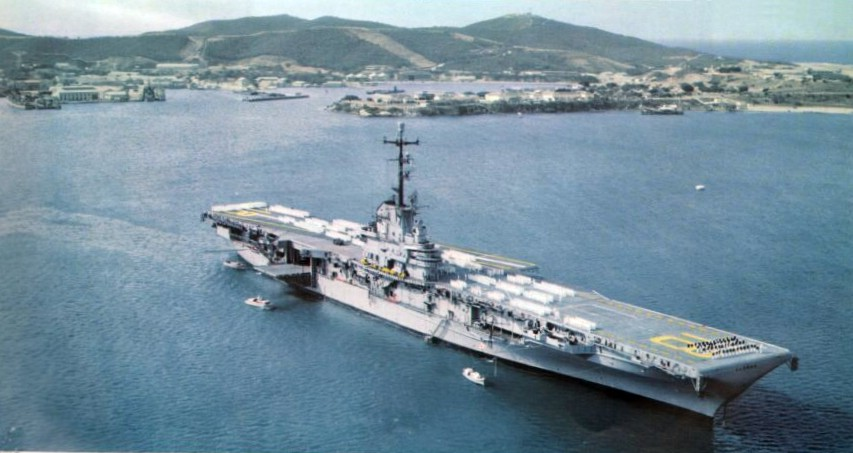
Wasp during a stopover on her Mediterranean cruise in 1958

After training during the early months of 1956, Wasp departed San Diego on 23 April for another cruise to the Far East with Carrier Air Group 15 embarked. She stopped at Pearl Harbor to undergo inspection and training, and then proceeded to Guam, where she arrived in time for the Armed Forces Day ceremonies on 14 May. En route to Japan in May, she joined TF 77 for Operation Sea Horse, a five-day period of day and night training for the ship and air group. The ship arrived at Yokosuka on 4 June, visited Iwakuni, Japan, then steamed to Manila for a brief visit. Following a drydock period at Yokosuka, Wasp again steamed south to Cubi Point, Philippine Islands, for the commissioning of the new naval air station there. Carrier Air Group 15 provided an air show for President Magsaysay and Admiral Arthur Radford. During the third week of August, Wasp was at Yokosuka enjoying what was scheduled to be a fortnight's stay, but she sailed a week early to aid other ships in searching for survivors of a Navy patrol plane which had been shot down on 23 August off the coast of mainland China. After a futile search, the ship proceeded to Kobe, Japan, and made a final stop at Yokosuka before leaving the Far East.

Wasp returned to San Diego on 15 October and while there was reclassified an antisubmarine warfare aircraft carrier CVS-18, effective on 1 November 1956. She spent the last days of 1956 in San Diego preparing for her transfer to the east coast. Wasp left San Diego on the last day of January 1957, rounded Cape Horn for operations in the South Atlantic and Caribbean Sea, then proceeded to Boston, where she arrived on 21 March. The carrier came into Norfolk, Virginia, on 6 April to embark members of her crew from the Antisubmarine Warfare School. The carrier spent the next few months in tactics along the Eastern Seaboard and in the waters off Bermuda before returning to Boston on 16 August.

On 3 September, Wasp got underway to participate in NATO Operations Seaspray and Strikeback, which took her to the coast of Scotland and simulated nuclear attacks and counterattacks on 130 different land bases. The carrier returned to Boston on 23 October 1957 and entered the Boston Naval Shipyard for a major overhaul, which was not completed until 10 March 1958 when she sailed for antisubmarine warfare practice at Guantánamo Bay, Cuba. Upon returning to Boston on 29 April and picking up air squadrons at Naval Air Station Quonset Point, Rhode Island, on 12 May, she became the hub of TF 66, a special antisubmarine group of the 6th Fleet.

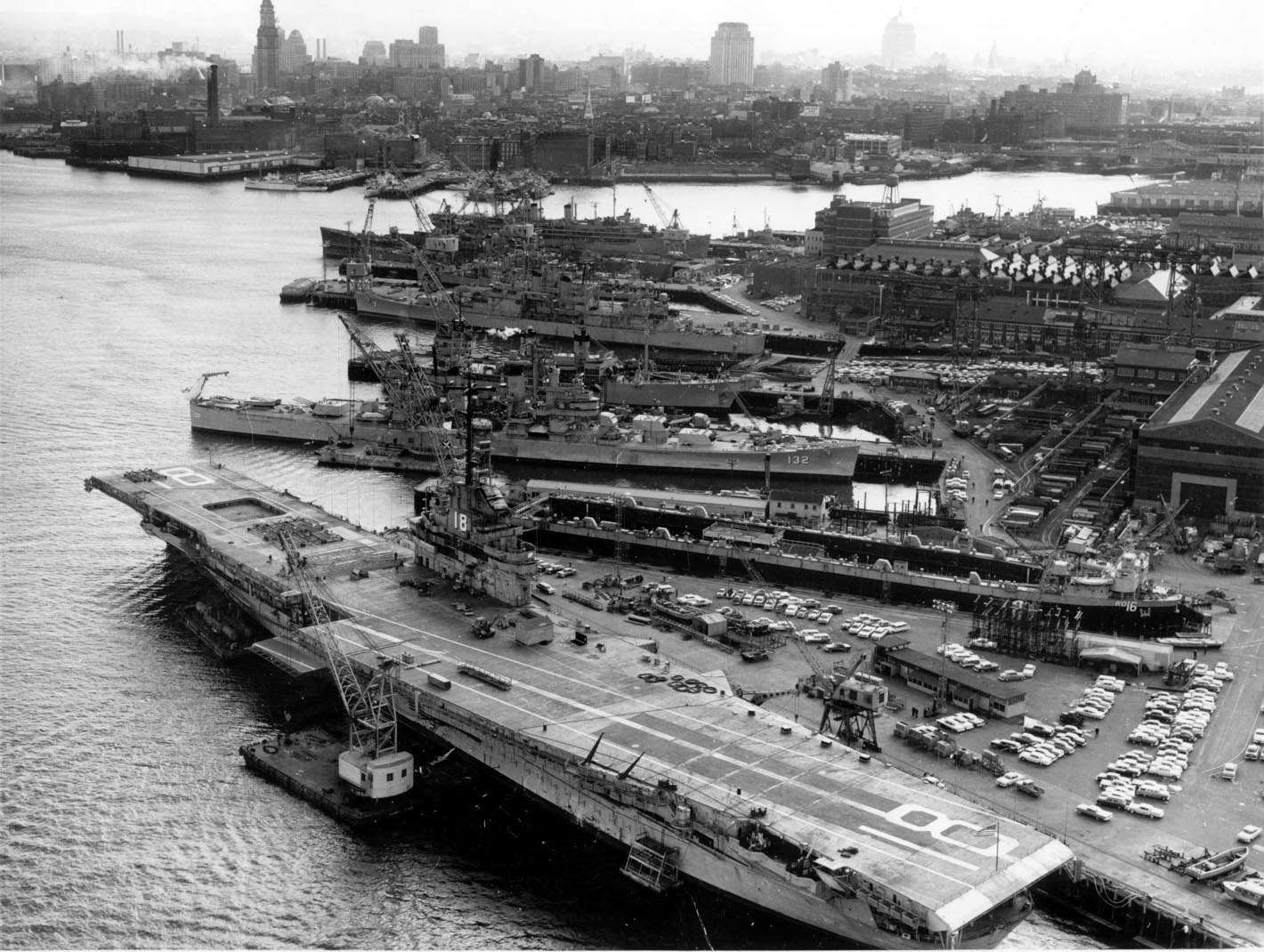
Wasp at Boston Naval Shipyard, April 1960

The carrier began her Atlantic crossing on 12 May and sailed only a few hundred miles when trouble flared in Lebanon. Wasp arrived at Gibraltar on 21 May and headed east, making stops at Souda Bay, Crete, Rhodes, and Athens. Wasp next spent 10 days at sea conducting a joint Italian-American antisubmarine warfare exercise in the Tyrrhenian Sea off Sardinia. On 15 July, the carrier put to sea to patrol waters off Lebanon. Her Marine helicopter transport squadron left the ship five days later to set up camp at the Beirut International Airport. They flew reconnaissance missions and transported the sick and injured from Marine battalions in the hills to the evacuation hospital at the airport. She continued to support forces ashore in Lebanon until 17 September 1958, when she departed Beirut Harbor, bound for home. She reached Norfolk on 7 October, unloaded supplies, and then made a brief stop at Quonset Point before arriving in her home port of Boston on 11 October.

Four days later, Wasp became the flagship of Task Group Bravo, one of two new antisubmarine defense groups formed by the commander in chief of the Atlantic Fleet. Wasp's air squadrons and seven destroyers were supported by shore-based seaplane patrol aircraft. She sailed from Quonset Point on 26 November for a 17-day cruise in the North Atlantic. This at-sea period marked the first time her force operated together as a team. The operations continued day and night to coordinate and develop the task group's team capabilities until she returned to Boston on 13 December 1958 and remained over the Christmas holiday season.

Wasp operated with Task Group Bravo throughout 1959, cruising along the Eastern Seaboard conducting operations at Norfolk, Bermuda, and Quonset Point. The ship was heavily damaged by an explosion and subsequent fires on 18 August 1959, when a helicopter engine exploded while being tested in hangar bay number one. The fires required two hours to control. At the time of the accident, Wasp was carrying nuclear weapons. In the first 30 minutes as the fires burned out of control and the forward magazines were flooded, preliminary preparations were also made to flood the nuclear weapon magazine. This was not done, however, and 30 minutes later, the nuclear weapon magazine reported no significant rise in temperature.

On 27 February 1960, Wasp entered the Boston Naval Shipyard for overhaul. In mid-July, the carrier was ordered to the South Atlantic, where she stood by when civil strife broke out in the newly independent Congo and operated in support of the United Nations airlift. She returned to her home port on 11 August and spent the remainder of the year operating out of Boston with visits to Guantanamo Bay, Cuba, for refresher training and exercises conducted in the Virginia Capes operating areas and the Caribbean operating areas. The carrier returned to Boston on 10 December and remained in port there into the New Year.

==== 1961–1965 ====
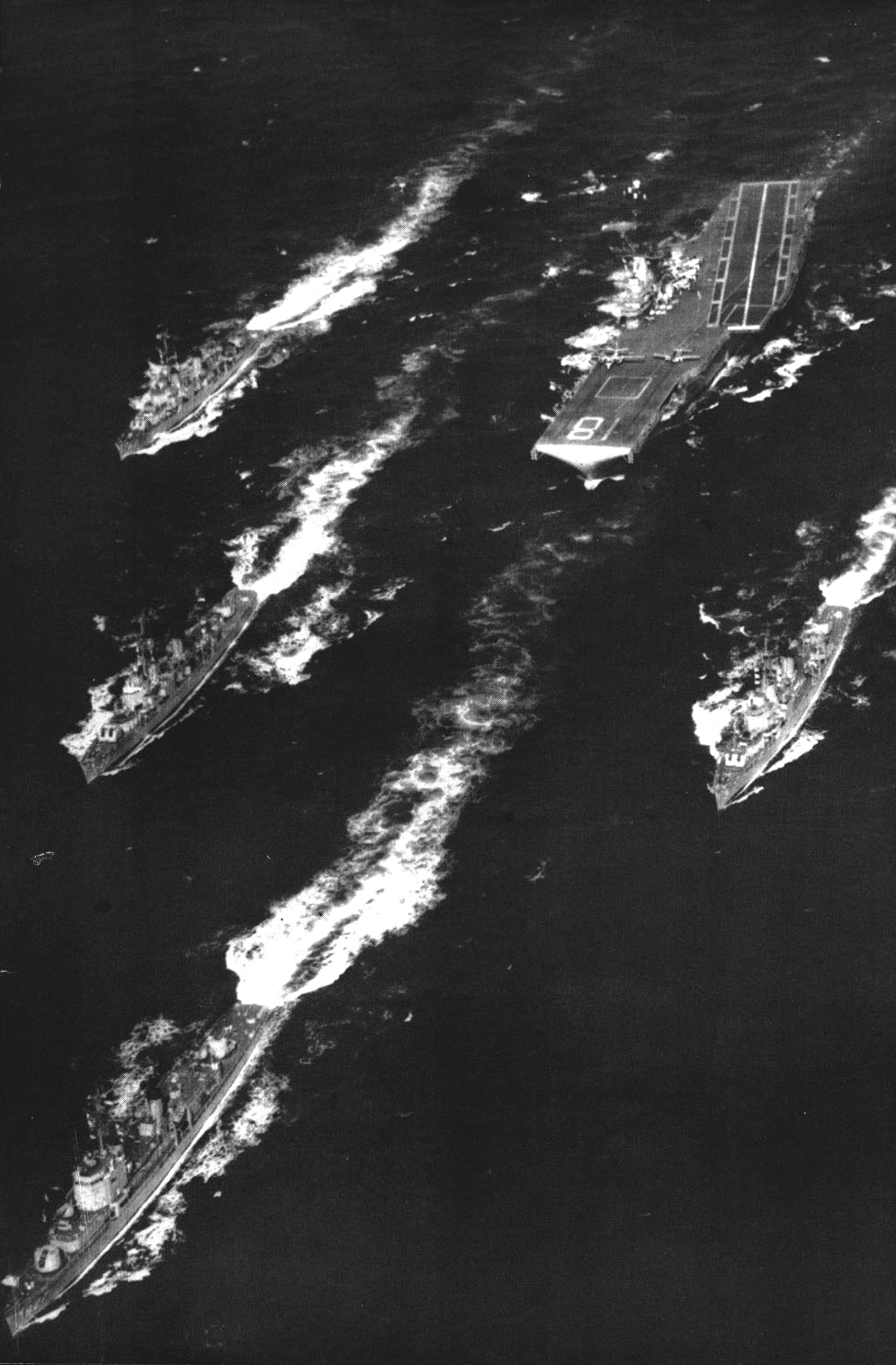
Wasp in ASW task group Bravo, c.1961

On 9 January 1961, Wasp sailed for the Virginia Capes operating area and devoted the first half of 1961 to exercises there, at Narragansett Bay, Rhode Island, and at Nova Scotia. On 9 June, Wasp got underway from Norfolk, for a three-month Mediterranean cruise. The ship conducted exercises at Augusta Bay, Sicily; Barcelona, Spain; San Remo and La Spezia, Italy; Aranci Bay, Sardinia; Genoa, Italy; and Cannes, France, and returned to Boston on 1 September. The carrier entered the Boston Naval Shipyard for an interim overhaul and resumed operations on 6 November 1961. After loading food, clothing, and equipment, Wasp spent the period 11–18 January 1962 conducting antisubmarine warfare exercises and submarine surveillance off the East Coast. After a brief stop at Norfolk, the ship steamed on to further training exercises and anchored off Bermuda 24–31 January. Wasp then returned to her home port.

On 17 February, a delegation from the Plimoth Plantation presented a photograph of the Mayflower II to Captain Brewer, who accepted this gift for Wasp's "People to People" effort in the forthcoming European cruise. On 18 February, Wasp departed Boston, bound for England, and arrived at Portsmouth on 1 March. On 16 March, the carrier arrived at Rotterdam, Netherlands, for a week's goodwill visit. From 22 to 30 March, Wasp traveled to Greenock, Scotland, thence to Plymouth. On 17 April, Captain Brewer presented Alderman A. Goldberg, Lord Mayor of Plymouth, the large picture of Mayflower II as a gift from the people of Plymouth, Massachusetts. On 5 May, Wasp arrived at Kiel, West Germany, and became the first aircraft carrier to ever visit that port. The ship made calls at Oslo, Reykjavík, and Naval Station Argentia, Newfoundland and Labrador, before returning to Boston, Massachusetts, on 16 June.

From August through October, Wasp visited Newport, Rhode Island, New York City, and Naval Weapons Station Earle in New Jersey, then conducted a dependents' cruise, as well as a reserve cruise, and visitors cruises. On 1 November, Wasp used her capabilities when she responded to a call from President John F. Kennedy and actively participated in the Cuban blockade. After tension relaxed, the carrier returned to Boston on 22 November for upkeep work, and on 21 December, she sailed to Bermuda with 18 midshipmen from Boston-area universities. Wasp returned to Boston on 29 December and finished out the year there.

The early part of 1963 had Wasp conducting antisubmarine warfare exercises off the Virginia Capes and steaming along the Caribbean coast of Costa Rica in support of the presidential visit. On 21 March, President Kennedy arrived at San José for a conference with presidents of six Central American nations. After taking part in fleet exercises off Puerto Rico, the carrier returned to Boston on 4 April. From 11 to 18 May, Wasp took station off Bermuda as a backup recovery ship for Major Gordon Cooper's historic Mercury space capsule recovery. The landing occurred as planned in the mid-Pacific near Midway Atoll, and carrier Kearsarge picked up Cooper and his Faith 7 spacecraft. Wasp then resumed antisubmarine warfare exercises along the Atlantic Seaboard and in the Caribbean until she underwent overhaul in the fall of 1963 for Fleet Rehabilitation and Modernization overhaul in the Boston Naval Shipyard.

In March 1964, the carrier conducted sea trials out of Boston. During April, she operated out of Norfolk and Narragansett Bay. She returned to Boston on 4 May and remained there until 14 May, when she got underway for refresher training in waters between Guantánamo Bay and Kingston, Jamaica, before returning to her home port on 3 June 1964. On 21 July 1964, Wasp began a round-trip voyage to Norfolk and returned to Boston on 7 August. She remained there through 8 September, when she headed, via the Virginia Capes operating area, to Valencia, Spain. She then cruised the Mediterranean, visiting ports in Spain, France, and Italy, and returned home on 18 December.

The carrier remained in port until 8 February 1965, and sailed for fleet exercises in the Caribbean. Operating along the Eastern Seaboard, she recovered the Gemini IV astronauts James McDivitt and Ed White and their spacecraft on 7 June after splashdown. Gemini IV was the mission of the first American to walk in space, Ed White. During the summer, the ship conducted search and rescue operations for an Air Force C-121 plane which had gone down off Nantucket. Following an orientation cruise for 12 congressmen on 20–21 August, Wasp participated in joint training exercises with German and French forces. From 16 to 18 December, the carrier recovered the astronauts of Gemini VI-A, Wally Schirra and Thomas P. Stafford and its sister craft, Gemini VII, Frank Borman and Jim Lovell—the participants involved in the first-ever manned space rendezvous—after their respective splashdowns, and then returned to Boston on 22 December to finish out the year.

==== 1966–1967 ====
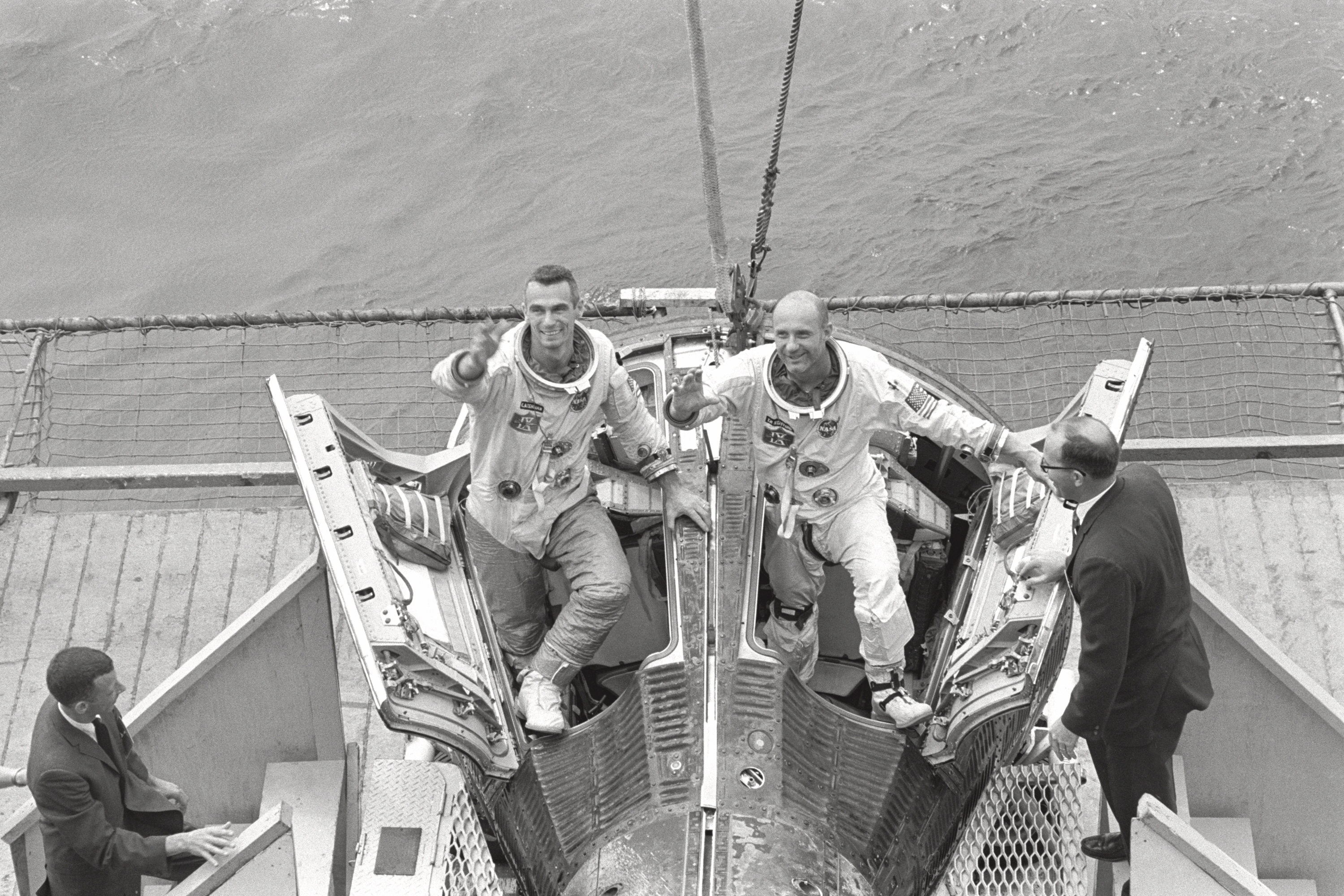
Gemini IX astronauts Eugene Cernan and Thomas Stafford aboard Wasp on 9 June 1966

On 24 January 1966, Wasp departed Boston for fleet exercises off Puerto Rico. En route, heavy seas and high winds caused structural damage to the carrier. She put into Roosevelt Roads, Puerto Rico, on 1 February to determine the extent of her damages and effect as much repair as possible. Engineers flown from Boston decided that the ship could cease "Springboard" operations early and return to Boston. The ship conducted limited antisubmarine operations from 6–8 February prior to leaving the area. She arrived at Boston on 18 February and was placed in restricted availability until 7 March, when her repair work was completed. Wasp joined in exercises in the Narragansett Bay operating areas. While the carrier was carrying out this duty, a television film crew from the National Broadcasting Company was flown to Wasp on 21 March and stayed on the ship during the remainder of her period at sea, filming material for a special color television show to be presented on Armed Forces Day.

The carrier returned to Boston on 24 March 1966 and was moored there until 11 April. On 27 March, Doctor Ernst Lemberger, the Austrian Ambassador to the United States, visited the ship. On 18 April, the ship embarked several guests of the Secretary of the Navy and set courses for Guantanamo Bay, Cuba. She returned to Boston on 6 May. A week later, the veteran flattop sailed to take part in the recovery of the Gemini IX spacecraft. Embarked in Wasp were some 66 persons from NASA, the television industry, media personnel, an underwater demolition recovery team, and a Defense Department medical team. On 6 June, she recovered astronauts Lt. Col. Thomas P. Stafford and LCDR Eugene Cernan and flew them to Cape Kennedy. Wasp returned their capsule to Boston.

Wasp participated in ASWEX III, an antisubmarine exercise which lasted from 20 June through 1 July 1966. She spent the next 25 days in port at Boston for upkeep. On the 25th, the carrier got underway for ASWEX IV. During this exercise, the Soviet intelligence collection vessel, Agi Traverz, entered the operation area, necessitating a suspension of the operation and eventual repositioning of forces. The exercise was terminated on 5 August. She then conducted a dependents' day cruise on 8–9 August, and orientation cruises on 10, 11, and 22 August. After a two-day visit to New York, Wasp arrived in Boston on 1 September and underwent upkeep until 19 September. From that day to 4 October, she conducted hunter/killer operations with the Royal Canadian Navy aircraft embarked.

Following upkeep at Boston, the ship participated in the Gemini XII recovery operation from 5 to 18 November 1966. The recovery took place on 15 November when the space capsule splashed down within 3 mi (4.8 km) of Wasp. Captain James A. Lovell and Major Edwin E. "Buzz" Aldrin were lifted by helicopter hoist to the deck of Wasp and there enjoyed two days of celebration. Wasp arrived at Boston on 18 November with the Gemini XII spacecraft on board. After off-loading the special Gemini support equipment, Wasp spent 10 days making ready for her next period at sea. On 28 November Wasp departed Boston to take part in the Atlantic Fleet's largest exercise of the year, Lantflex-66, in which more than 100 US ships took part. The carrier returned to Boston on 16 December, where she remained through the end of 1966.

Wasp served as carrier qualification duty ship for the Naval Air Training Command from 24 January to 26 February 1967 and conducted operations in the Gulf of Mexico and off the east coast of Florida. Noteworthy during this period was the celebration of her 58,000th carrier landing on 10 February 1967 as Ensign Donald Koch carrier qualified with two touch-and-gos and six arrested landings in a T-28C. She called at New Orleans for Mardi Gras 4–8 February, at Pensacola on 11 and 12 February, and at Naval Station Mayport, on 19 and 20 February. Returning to Boston a week later, she remained in port until 19 March, when she sailed for Springboard operations in the Caribbean. On 24 March, Wasp joined Salamonie for an underway replenishment, but suffered damage during a collision with the oiler. After making repairs at Roosevelt Roads, she returned to operations on 29 March and visited Charlotte Amalie, St. Thomas, United States Virgin Islands, and participated in the celebration from 30 March to 2 April which marked the 50th anniversary of the purchase of the Virgin Islands by the United States from Denmark. Wasp returned to Boston on 7 April, remained in port four days, then sailed to Earle, New Jersey, to offload ammunition prior to overhaul. She visited New York for three days, then returned to the Boston Naval Shipyard and began an overhaul on 21 April 1967, which was not completed until early 1968.

==== 1968–1970 ====
Wasp completed her cyclical overhaul and conducted postrepair trials throughout January 1968. Returning to the Boston Naval Shipyard on 28 January, the ship made ready for two months of technical evaluation and training which began early in February. Five weeks of refresher training for Wasp began on 28 February, under the operational control of Commander, Fleet Training Group, Guantanamo Bay, Cuba. On 30 March, Wasp steamed north and was in Boston 6–29 April for routine upkeep and minor repairs. She then departed for operations in the Bahamas and took part in Fixwex C, an exercise off the Bermuda coast. The carrier set course for home on 20 May, but left five days later to conduct carrier qualifications for students of the Naval Air Training Command in the Jacksonville, Florida, operations area. On 12 June, Wasp and Truckee had a minor collision during an underway replenishment. The carrier returned to Norfolk, where an investigation into the circumstances of the collision was conducted. On 20 June, Wasp got underway for Boston, where she remained until 3 August when she moved to Norfolk to take on ammunition.

On 15 June, Wasp's home port was changed to Quonset Point and she arrived there on 10 August to prepare for overseas movement. Ten days later, the carrier got underway for a deployment in European waters. The northern European portion of the cruise consisted of several operational periods and port visits to Portsmouth, England; Firth of Clyde, Scotland; Hamburg, Germany; and Lisbon, Portugal. Wasp, as part of TG 87.1, joined in the NATO Exercise Silvertower, the largest combined naval exercise in four years. Silvertower brought together surface, air, and subsurface units of several NATO navies. On 25 October 1968, the carrier entered the Mediterranean, and the following day, became part of TG 67.6. After a port visit to Naples, Italy, Wasp departed on 7 November to conduct antisubmarine warfare exercises in the Tyrrhenian Sea, Levantine Basin, and Ionian Basin. After loading aircraft in both Taranto and Naples, Italy, Wasp visited Barcelona, Spain, and Gibraltar. On 19 December, the ship returned to Quonset Point, and spent the remainder of 1968 in port.

Wasp began 1969 in her home port of Quonset Point. Following a yard period which lasted from 10 January through 17 February, the carrier conducted exercises as part of the White Task Group in the Bermuda operating area. The ship returned to Quonset Point on 6 March and began a month of preparations for overseas movement. On 1 April 1969, Wasp sailed for the eastern Atlantic and arrived at Lisbon, Portugal, on 16 April. From 21 to 26 April, she took part in joint Exercise Trilant, which was held with the navies of the United States, Spain, and Portugal. One of the highlights of the cruise occurred on 15 May, as Wasp arrived at Portsmouth, England, and served as flagship for TF 87, representing the United States in a NATO review by Queen Elizabeth and Prince Philip in which 64 ships from the 11 NATO countries participated. After conducting exercises and visiting Rotterdam, Oslo, and Copenhagen, Wasp headed home on 30 June, and but for a one-day United Fund cruise on 12 August, remained at Quonset Point until 24 August. The period from 29 August to 6 October was devoted to alternating operations between Corpus Christi, Texas, for advanced carrier qualifications, and Pensacola for basic qualifications, with in-port periods at Pensacola.

A period of restricted availability began on 10 October and was followed by operations in the Virginia Capes area until 22 November. In December, Wasp conducted a carrier qualification mission in the Jacksonville operations area which lasted through 10 December. The ship arrived back at Quonset Point on 13 December and remained there for the holidays. The carrier welcomed 1970 moored in her home port of Quonset Point, but traveled over 40,000 mi (64,000 km) and was away from home port 265 days. On 4 January, she proceeded to Earle, NJ, and offloaded ammunition prior to entering the Boston Naval Shipyard for a six-week overhaul on 9 January.

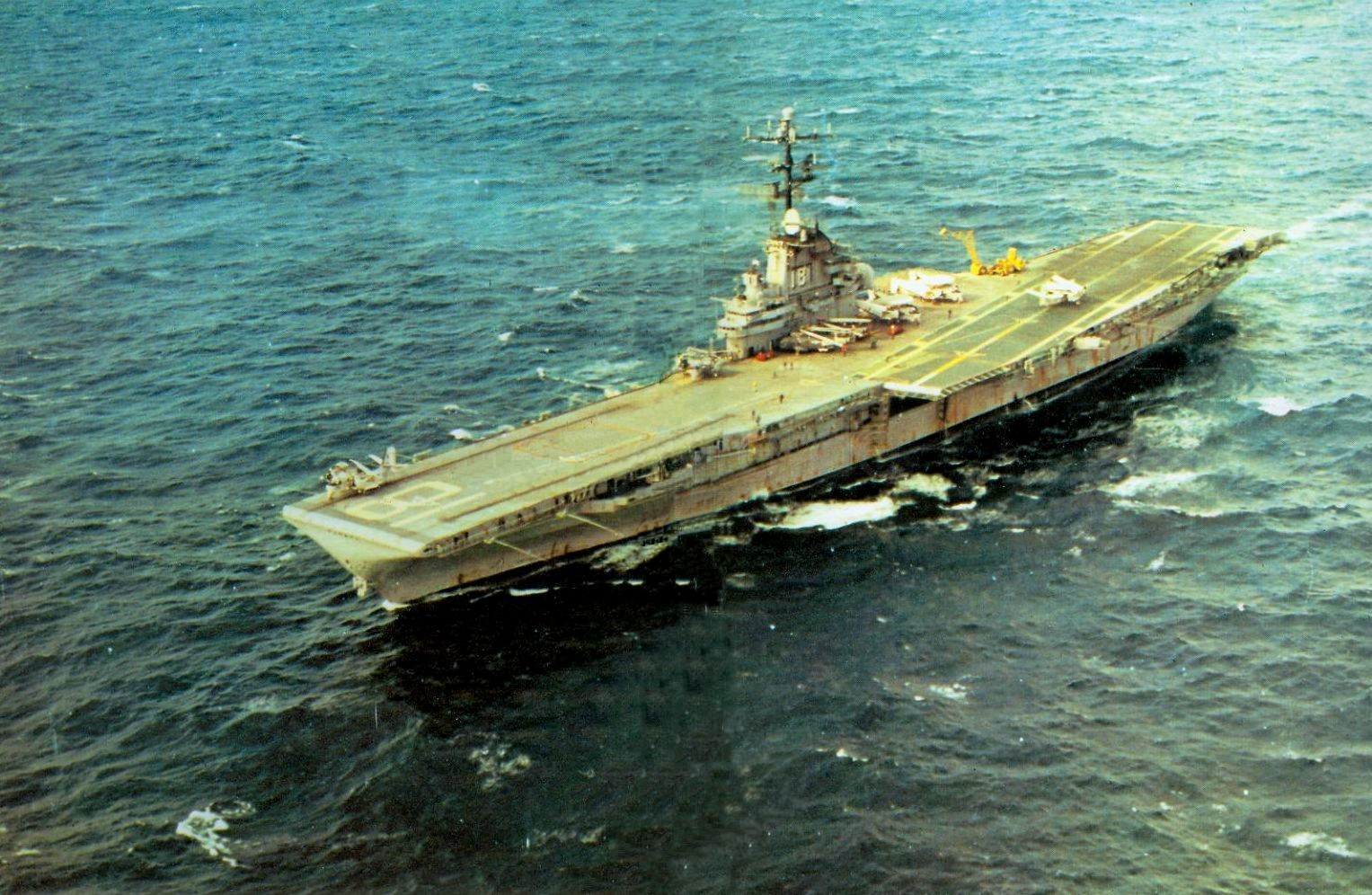
Wasp during her 1970 EASTLANT cruise

The carrier began a three-week shakedown cruise on 16 March, but returned to her home port on 3 April and began preparing for an eastern Atlantic deployment. Wasp reached Lisbon on 25 May 1970 and dropped anchor in the Tagus River. A week later, the carrier got underway to participate in NATO Exercise Night Patrol with units from Canada, the Netherlands, Portugal, the United Kingdom, and West Germany. On 8 June, Wasp proceeded to Rota, Spain, to embark a group of midshipmen for a cruise to Copenhagen. During exercises in Scandinavian waters, the carrier was shadowed by Soviet naval craft and aircraft. The ship departed Copenhagen on 26 June, and three days later, crossed the Arctic Circle.

On 13 July 1970, Wasp arrived at Hamburg, Germany, and enjoyed the warmest welcome received in any port of the cruise. A Visitors' Day was held, and over 15,000 Germans were recorded as visitors to the carrier. After calls at Edinburgh and Glasgow, Scotland, Wasp got underway on 10 August for operating areas in the Norwegian Sea, as well as a port call in Oslo. The carrier anchored near Plymouth on 28 August, and two days later, sailed for her home port. Wasp returned to Quonset Point on 8 September and remained there through 11 October, when she got underway to offload ammunition at Earle, prior to a period of restricted availability at the Boston Naval Shipyard beginning on 15 October. The work ended on 14 December; after reloading ammunition at Earle, Wasp returned to Quonset Point on 19 December to finish out 1970.

==== 1971–1972 ====
On 14 January 1971, Wasp departed Quonset Point with Commander, ASWGRU 2, CVSG-54 and Detachment 18 from Fleet Training Group, Guantanamo Bay, Cuba, embarked. After refresher training at Bermuda, she stopped briefly at Rota, then proceeded to the Mediterranean for participation in the National Week VIII exercises with several destroyers for the investigation of known Soviet submarine operating areas. On 12 February, Secretary of the Navy John Chafee visited the carrier accompanied by Commander, 6th Fleet, Vice Admiral Isaac C. Kidd Jr. Wasp detached early from the National Week exercise on 15 February to support John F. Kennedy as she steamed toward Gibraltar. Soviet ships trailed Wasp and John F. Kennedy until they entered the Strait of Sicily when the Soviets departed to the east. After a brief stop at Barcelona, Wasp began her homeward journey on 24 February and arrived at Quonset Point on 3 March.

After spending March and April in port, Wasp got underway on 27 April and conducted a nuclear technical proficiency inspection and prepared for the forthcoming Exotic Dancer exercise which commenced on 3 May. Having successfully completed the week-long exercise, Wasp was heading home on 8 May when an ABC television team embarked and filmed a short news report on carrier antisubmarine warfare operations. On 15 May, the veteran conducted a dependents' day cruise, and one month later, participated in Exercise Rough Ride at Great Sound, Bermuda, which took her to Halifax, Nova Scotia. Wasp returned to Quonset Point on 2 July 1971, and spent the next two months in preparation and execution of Exercise Squeeze Play IX in the Bermuda operating area. In August, the ship conducted exercises with an East Coast naval reserve air group while proceeding to Mayport, Florida. She returned to her home port on 26 August and spent the next month there. On 23 September, Wasp got underway for Exercise Lantcortex 1-72, which terminated on 6 October. For the remainder of the month, the carrier joined in a crossdeck operation which took her to Bermuda, Mayport, and Norfolk. She arrived back at Quonset Point on 4 November.

Four days later, the carrier set her course for the Newport News Shipbuilding and Drydock Co., where she was in drydock until 22 November. She then returned to Quonset Point and remained in her home port for the remainder of the year preparing for decommissioning. On 1 March 1972, it was announced that Wasp would be decommissioned and stricken from the Naval Vessel Register after more than 28 years of service. Decommissioning ceremonies were held on 1 July 1972. The ship was sold on 21 May 1973 to the Union Minerals and Alloys Corporation, of New York City, and subsequently scrapped at the former site of the Federal Shipbuilding and Drydock Company shipyard, Kearny, New Jersey. Her anchor is on display at the Freedom Park.

== Awards ==
Wasp earned eight battle stars for her World War II service.

| Navy Unit Commendation (twice) | | Navy Meritorious Unit Commendation |
| China Service Medal (extended) | American Campaign Medal | Asiatic-Pacific Campaign Medal (8 battle stars ) |
| World War II Victory Medal | Navy Occupation Medal (with Europe clasp) | National Defense Service Medal (twice) |
| Armed Forces Expeditionary Medal (thrice) | Philippine Presidential Unit Citation | Philippine Liberation Medal (2 battle stars) |

== See also ==
- List of aircraft carriers
- Wings of Fury, 1987 video game that centers around the Wasp
