= 1850 Naval Air Squadron =

Inactive flying squadron of the Royal Navy's Fleet Air Arm

- Squadron badge
- Active: 1944–1946
- Disbanded: 12 August 1946
- Country: United Kingdom
- Branch: Royal Navy
- Type: Single-seat fighter squadron
- Role: Fighter squadron
- Size: Eighteen aircraft
- Part of: Fleet Air Arm
- Home station: See Naval air stations section for full list.

Commanders
- Notable commanders: Lieutenant Commander(A) M. Hordern, RN

Insignia
- Squadron Badge Description: White, a wyvern ramping red armed and langued blue (1945)
- Identification Markings: 1+ V16 single letters (December 1944); N5A+ (June 1945); 111-131 (October 1945); V8A+ (May 1946)
- Fin Carrier Codes: A (October 1945)

Aircraft flown
- Fighter: Vought Corsair

1850 Naval Air Squadron (1850 NAS) was a Fleet Air Arm (FAA) naval air squadron of the United Kingdom's Royal Navy (RN). It formed in the United States at RN Air Section Brunswick as a fighter squadron in August 1944, with Vought Corsair aircraft before joining HMS Reaper to cross the Atlantic. On arrival in the UK it expanded its aircraft absorbing part of the disbanded 1849 Naval Air Squadron. After working up at HMS Gadwall, at RNAS Belfast, HMS Gannet, at RNAS Eglinton and HMS Wagtail, at RNAS Ayr, the squadron undertook deck landing training on HMS Venerable during February 1945, before joining her sister ship, HMS Vengeance. The ship sailed for the Far East to join the British Pacific Fleet and the squadron went ashore to HMS Valluru at Tambaram and HMS Garuda, at Coimbatore, in southern India in June for weapon training and dive bombing practice, becoming part of the 13th Carrier Air Group. With the end of the Second World War it returned to the UK and disbanded at HMS Siskin, at RNAS Gosport, in August 1946.

== History ==
=== Single-seat fighter squadron (1944–1946) ===
1850 Naval Air Squadron formed on 1 August 1944 in the United States at RN Air Section Brunswick, which was located at United States Naval Air Station (USNAS) Brunswick, Maine, as a Single Seat Fighter Squadron, under the command of Lieutenant Commander(A) M. Hordern, RN.

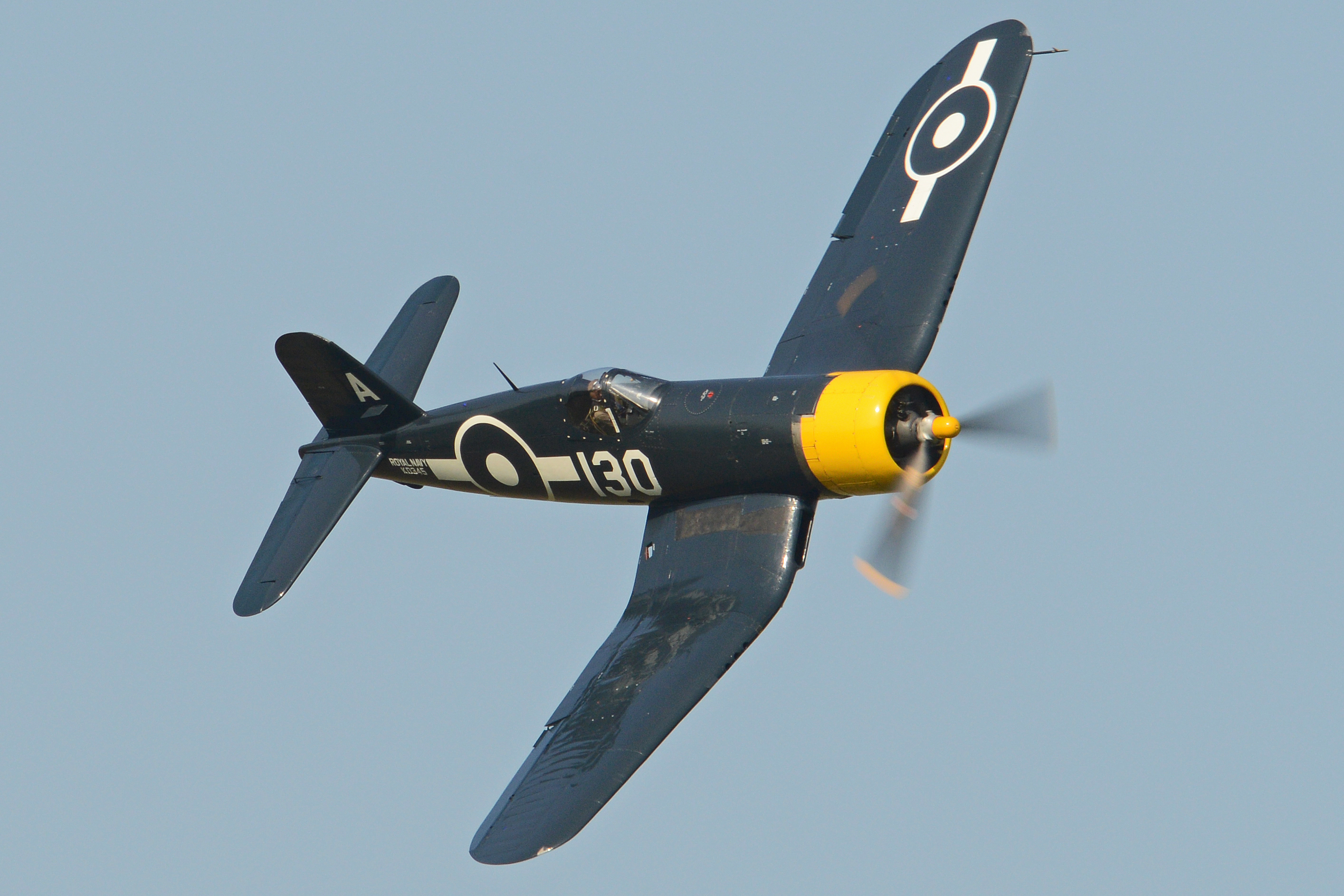
A Fleet Air Arm Goodyear FG-1D Corsair in 1850 Naval Air Squadron markings

It was equipped with eighteen Vought Corsair aircraft, an American carrier-borne fighter-bomber. These were the Goodyear built FG-1D variant, designated Corsair Mk IV by the Fleet Air Arm. Aerodrome Dummy Deck Landings (ADDLs) were undertaken at the nearby Bar Harbor Naval Auxiliary Air Facility (NAAF), Bar Harbor, Maine. The squadron flew to RN Air Section Norfolk situated at USNAS Norfolk, to enable it to undertake Deck Landing Training (DLT) with the United States Navy's escort carrier USS Charger, before returning to RN Air Section Brunswick.

With working up completed the squadron left RN Air Section Brunswick and flew to RN Air Section Floyd Bennett Field, located at USNAS Floyd Bennett Field, Brooklyn, New York City, on 15 November. Leaving the aircraft behind the aircrew travelled to Naval Station Norfolk to embarked in the ruler-class escort carrier, HMS Reaper. She sailed to New York City, where she embarked the squadron aircraft and joined Convoy CU.48 for the Atlantic crossing to the United Kingdom on 24 November. On 6 December the squadron disembarked to Royal Naval Air Maintenance Yard Belfast (HMS Gadwall), County Antrim, Northern Ireland.

On arrival it absorbed part of the disbanded 1849 Naval Air Squadron which increased the aircraft strength of the squadron to twenty-four aircraft. While waiting for the new colossus-class aircraft carrier, HMS Vengeance, to enter service and in order to continue training, the squadron moved to RNAS Eglinton (HMS Gannet), County Londonderry, on 27 December, then flew to Scotland on 13 January 1945 to RNAS Ayr (HMS Wagtail), Ayr.

It undertook deck landing training on the new light fleet, colossus-class aircraft carrier HMS Venerable, on 10 February, before eventually embarking in her sister ship, HMS Vengeance, on 25 for the British Pacific Fleet. The squadron disembarked to Royal Navy Aircraft Maintenance Yard Tambaram (HMS Valluru), Madras, and Royal Naval Aircraft Repair Yard Coimbatore (HMS Garuda), Coimbatore, in southern India, on 11 June and undertook weapon training and dive bombing practice, before becoming part of the 13th Carrier Air Group.

The squadron was too late to take an active part in the Second World War. It returned to the United Kingdom, where it disbanded on arrival at RNAS Gosport (HMS Siskin), Gosport, Hampshire, on 12 August.

== Aircraft flown ==
1850 Naval Air Squadron flew only one aircraft type:

- Vought Corsair Mk IV fighter bomber (August 1944 - August 1946)

== Assignments ==
1850 Naval Air Squadron was assigned as needed to form part of a number of larger units:

- 13th Carrier Air Group (30 June 1945 - 12 August 1946)

== Naval air stations ==
1850 Naval Air Squadron operated from a number of naval air stations of the Royal Navy, in the United Kingdom, and overseas, and a couple of Royal Navy fleet carriers and an escort carrier:

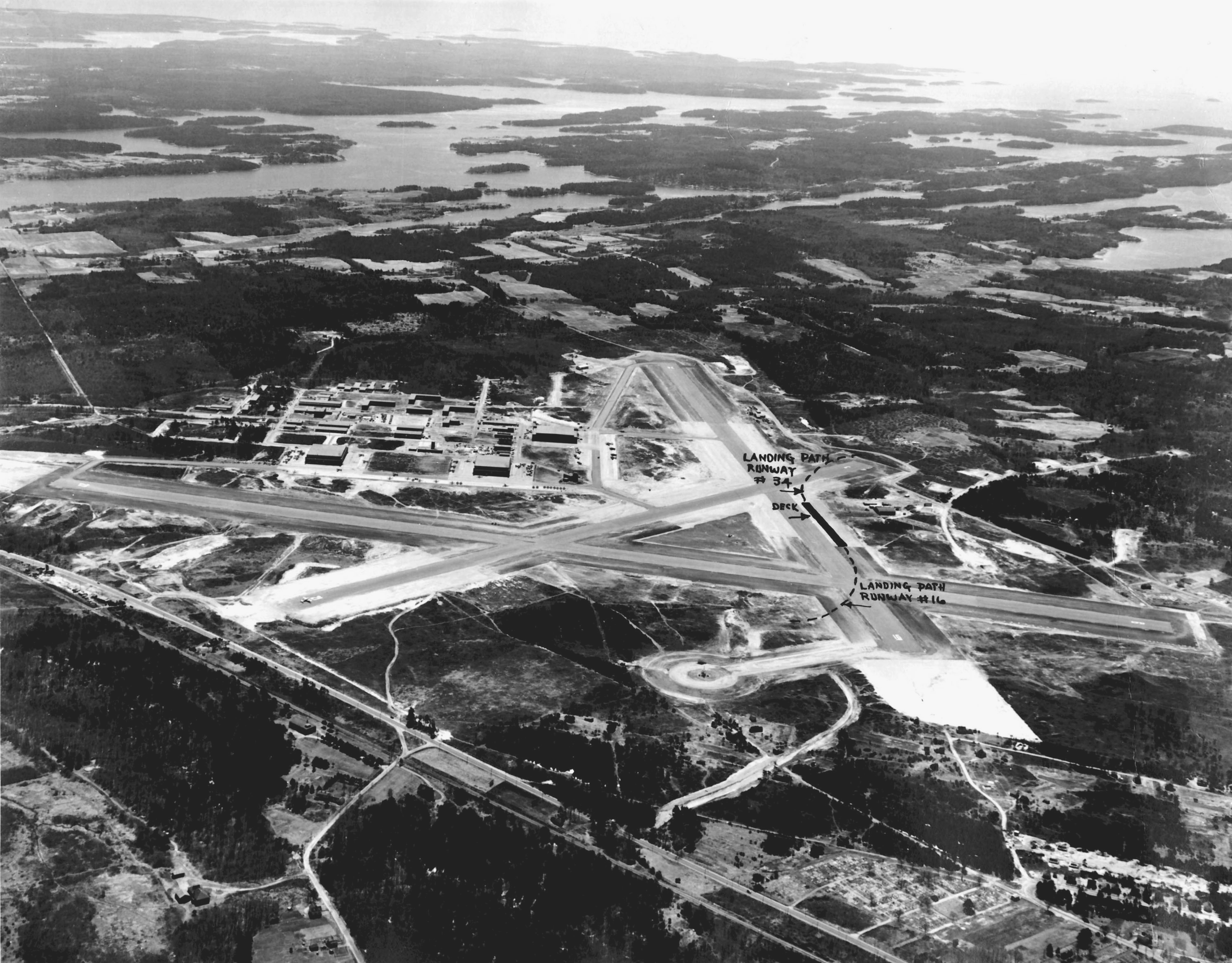
Naval Air Station Brunswick in 1944, location of RN Air Section Brunswick

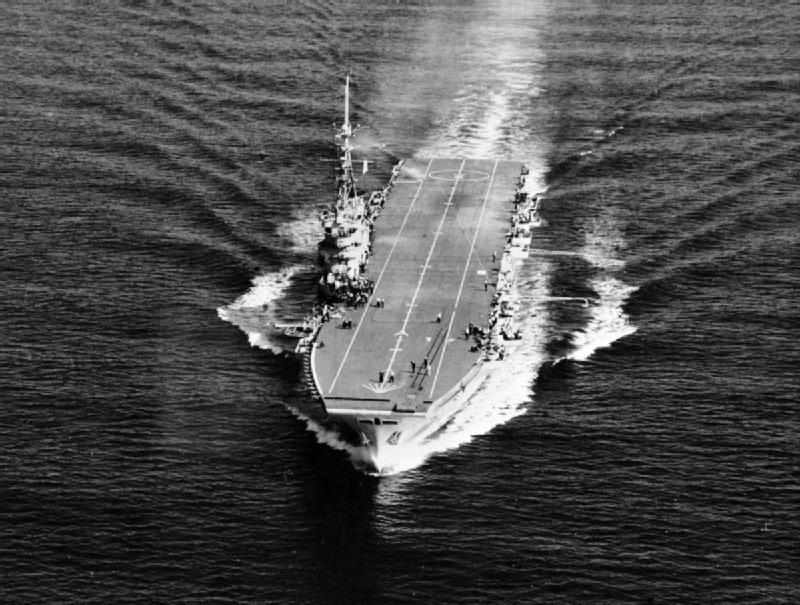
HMS Vengeance (R71) underway in 1945

- RN Air Section Brunswick, Maine, (1 August - 15 November 1944)
  - RN Air Section Norfolk, Virginia, (Detachment Deck Landing Training (DLT) USS Charger October 1944)
- RN Air Section Floyd Bennett Field, Brooklyn, (15 - 23 November 1944)
- HMS Reaper (23 November - 6 December 1944)
- Royal Naval Air Maintenance Yard Belfast (HMS Gadwell), County Antrim, (6 - 27 December 1944)
- Royal Naval Air Station Eglinton (HMS Gannet), County Londonderry, (27 December 1944 - 13 January 1945)
- Royal Naval Air Station Ayr (HMSWagtail), South Ayrshire, (13 - 20 January 1945)
- Royal Naval Air Station Eglinton (HMS Gannet), County Londonderry, (20 January - 10 February 1945)
- HMS Venerable (Deck Landing Training (DLT) 10 - 25 February 1945)
- HMS Vengeance (25 February - 19 March 1945)
- RN Air Section Hal Far, Malta, (19 March - 23 April 1945)
- HMS Vengeance (23 April - 11 June 1945)
- Royal Naval Air Station Tambaram (HMS Valluru), India / Royal Naval Air Station Coimbatore (HMS Garuda), India, (11 June - 1 July 1945)
- HMS Vengeance (1 - 22 July 1945)
- Royal Naval Air Station Jervis Bay (HMS Nabswick), Jervis Bay Territory, (22 July 13 August 1945)
- HMS Vengeance (13 August - 10 October 1945)
  - Royal Naval Air Station Ponam (HMS Nabaron), Admiralty Islands, (Detachment twelve aircraft 23 - 30 August 1945)
  - Royal Naval Air Station Kai Tak (HMS Nabcatcher), Hong Kong, (Detachment four aircraft 3 - 10 October 1945)
- Royal Naval Air Station Kai Tak (HMS Nabcatcher), Hong Kong, (10 October - 20 December 1945)
- HMS Vengeance (20 December 1945 - 12 January 1946)
- Royal Naval Air Station Schofields (HMS Nabstock), Queensland, (12 January - 19 March 1946)
- HMS Vengeance (19 March - 5 April 1946)
- Royal Naval Air Station Katukurunda (HMS Ukussa), Ceylon, (5 April - 11 June 1946)
- HMS Vengeance (11 June - 15 July 1946)
- Royal Naval Air Station Katukurunda (HMS Ukussa), Ceylon, (15 - 17 July 1946)
- HMS Vengeance (18 July - 12 August 1946)
- disbanded UK (12 August 1946)

== Commanding officers ==
List of commanding officers of 1850 Naval Air Squadron with date of appointment:

- Lieutenant Commander(A) M. Hordern, RN, from 1 August 1944
- Lieutenant Commander W.N. Waller, RN, from 2 December 1945
- disbanded - 12 August 1946

Note: Abbreviation (A) signifies Air Branch of the RN or RNVR.

== See also ==
- British Pacific Fleet
