= Operation LUSTY =

Post-WW2 US evaluations of captured German technology

Operation LUSTY ("Luftwaffe Secret Technology") was the United States Army Air Forces' effort to capture and evaluate German aeronautical technology during and after World War II. It was the precursor to Operation Paperclip and centered at Wright Field in Dayton, Ohio.

== Overview ==
During World War II, the U.S. Army Air Forces Intelligence Service sent teams to Europe to gain access to enemy aircraft, technical and scientific reports, research facilities, and weapons for study in the United States. The Air Technical Intelligence (ATI) teams, trained at the Technical Intelligence School at Wright Field, Ohio, collected enemy equipment to learn about Germany's technical developments. The ATI teams competed with 32 allied technical intelligence groups to gain information and equipment recovered from crash sites.

As the war concluded, the various intelligence teams, including the ATI, shifted from tactical intelligence to post hostilities investigations. Exploitation intelligence increased dramatically.

On 22 April 1945, the USAAF combined technical and post-hostilities intelligence objectives under the Exploitation Division with the code name Lusty. Operation Lusty began with the aim of exploiting captured German scientific documents, research facilities, and aircraft. The Operation had two teams.

Team One, under the leadership of Colonel Harold E. Watson, a former Wright Field test pilot, collected enemy aircraft and weapons for further examination in the United States.

Team Two, under the leadership of Colonel Howard M. McCoy, recruited scientists, collected documents and investigated facilities.

== Watson's "Whizzers" ==
By 1944, intelligence experts at Wright Field had developed lists of advanced aviation equipment they wanted to examine. Watson and his crew, nicknamed "Watson's Whizzers" and composed of pilots, engineers and maintenance men, used these "Black Lists" to collect aircraft. Watson organized his Whizzers into two sections: one collected jet aircraft while the other procured piston-engine aircraft and nonflyable jet and rocket equipment.

After the war, the Whizzers added Luftwaffe test pilots to the team, one being Hauptmann Heinz Braur. On 8 May 1945, Braur flew 70 women, children and wounded troops to Munich-Riem airport. After he landed, Braur was approached by one of Watson's men, who gave him the choice of either going to a prison camp or flying with the Whizzers; Braur thought flying preferable. Three Messerschmitt employees also joined the Whizzers: Karl Baur, the Chief Test Pilot of Experimental Aircraft, test pilot Ludwig Hoffman, and engineering superintendent Gerhard Coulis. Test pilot Herman Kersting joined later.

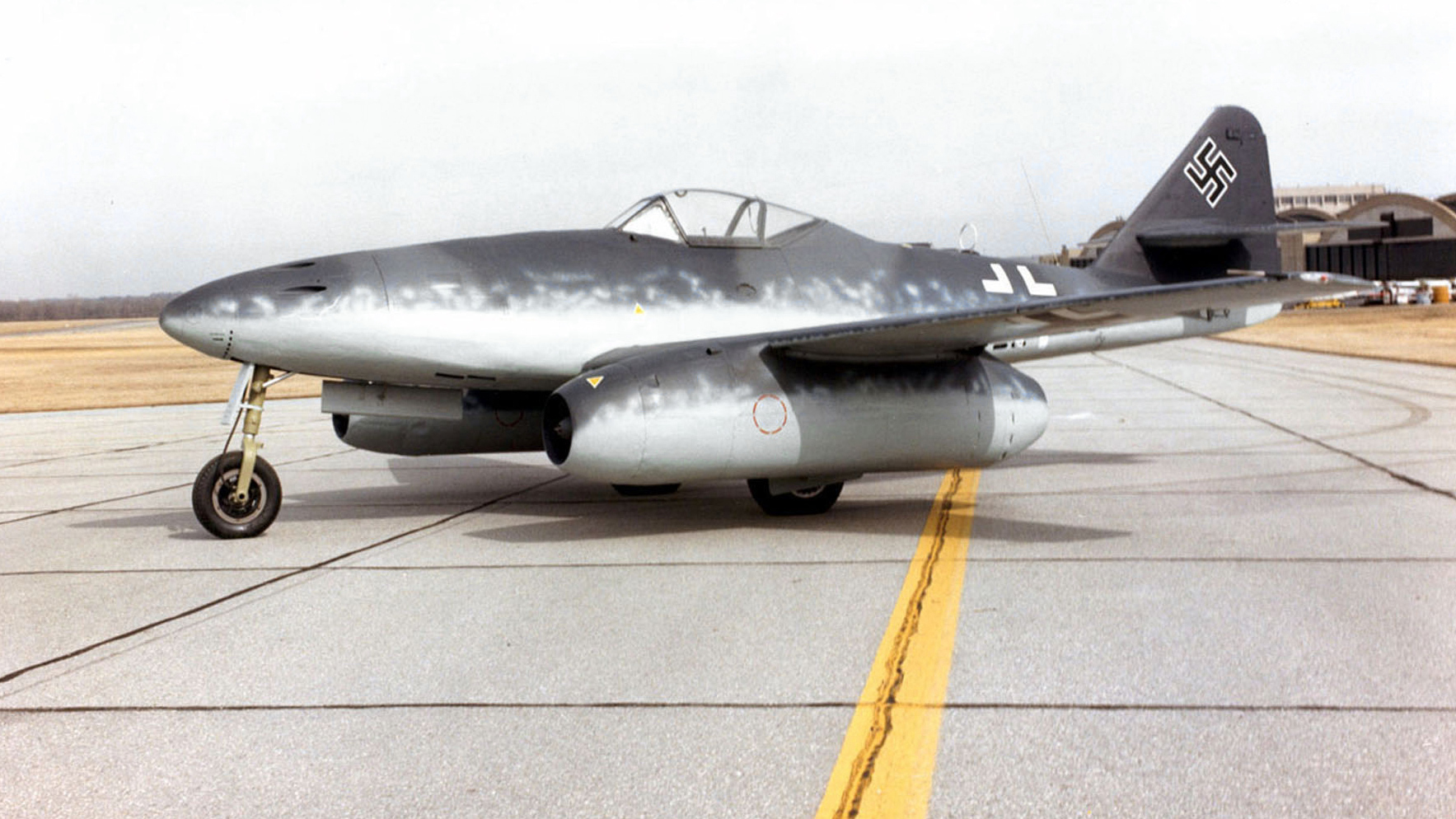
Messerschmitt Me 262A at the National Museum of the United States Air Force

When the Whizzers located nine Messerschmitt Me 262 jet aircraft at Lechfeld airfield near Augsburg, these German test pilots had the expertise to fly them. It has been alleged, and partially substantiated by declassified documents, that the Whizzers recruited captured Luftwaffe personnel and pilots held at Fort Bliss, Texas, to go into what would become the British, French and Soviet controlled areas after V-E Day to fly out, hide, or otherwise remove to U.S. controlled areas all "black listed" planes, secret weapons equipment and supporting documents, some four months before Germany's surrender.

Watson's men traveled across Europe to find the aircraft on the "Black Lists." Once found, they had to be shipped to the United States. In Operation Sea Horse the British loaned them the originally American-built escort carrier HMS Reaper, first commissioned for the US Navy as the USS Winjah. The most viable harbor for docking the carrier and loading the aircraft was at Cherbourg, France.

The Whizzers flew the Me 262s and other aircraft, including an Arado Ar 234 from Lechfeld, to St. Dizier, to Melun and then to Cherbourg, on Querqueville Airfield, also known as ALG A-23C Querqueville. All the aircraft were cocooned against the salt air and weather, loaded onto the carrier and taken to the United States, where they were offloaded at Newark Army Air Field. They were then studied at their respective flight test centers by the air intelligence groups of both the USAAF, the flight test center of which was then at Wilbur Wright Field, and the U.S. Navy, which had its facility at the Patuxent Naval Air Test Center.

One of the Messerschmitt Me 262 jets was named "Marge" by the mechanics; the pilots later renamed it "Lady Jess IV."

== Disposition of foreign equipment ==
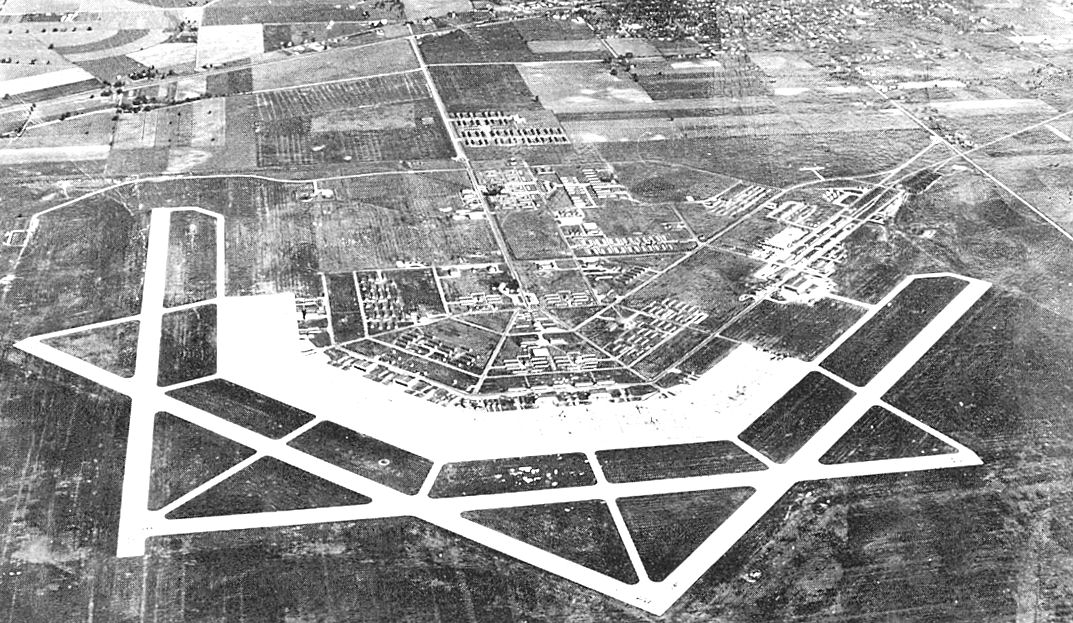
Freeman Army Airfield, 1946

In 1945 the enemy aircraft shipped to the United States were divided between the Navy and the Army Air Forces. General Hap Arnold ordered the preservation of one of every type of aircraft used by the enemy forces. The air force sent their aircraft to Wright Field. When the field could not handle additional aircraft, many were sent to Freeman Field, Seymour, Indiana. In the end, Operation Lusty collectors had acquired 16,280 items (6,200 tons) to be examined by intelligence personnel who selected 2,398 separate items for technical analysis. Forty-seven personnel were engaged in the identification, inspection and warehousing of captured foreign equipment.

In 1946, when Freeman Field was scheduled to close, Air Technical Service Command had to move the aircraft. The larger aircraft were sent to Davis-Monthan Field, Arizona, and the fighter aircraft sent to the Special Depot in Park Ridge, Illinois (now O'Hare Airport), which was under the control of ATSC's Office of Intelligence. The Special Depot occupied buildings that Douglas Airplane Co. had used to build C-54 aircraft. The aircraft were stored in these two locations until they could be disposed of in accordance with General Arnold's order.

With the start of the Korean War in 1950, the air force needed the storage buildings, so the aircraft were moved outside. In 1953 some of the aircraft were moved to what would later become known as the National Air and Space Museum's Garber Restoration Facility in Suitland, Maryland, and the remaining aircraft were scrapped. It is possible that, as part of Lusty, both an American-captured example of the Junkers Ju 290 four-engined maritime patrol aircraft, and a captured prototype example of the Heinkel He 177A-7 (Werknummer 550 256), a late war development of the Luftwaffe's only operational heavy bomber, had been ferried from Europe to the Park Ridge Depot, only to both be similarly crushed flat and buried under the modern O'Hare airport runways.

Operation Lusty resulted in the survival of the sole existing examples of the Arado Ar 234 (WkNr. 140 312) jet reconnaissance/bomber, the Dornier Do 335 (WkNr. 240 102) twin-engined heavy fighter, and the only readily restorable example in the United States of the German Heinkel He 219 night fighter (WkNr. 290 202), as well as the only surviving example of the Junkers Ju 388, a Ju 388L-1 reconnaissance model bearing WkNr. 560 049; all of which are in the collection of the Smithsonian's National Air and Space Museum. These are either currently restored and on display (for the Ar 234B and Do 335A sole survivors), under restoration and partial display (for the He 219A), or still awaiting restoration at the Garber Facility in Maryland (for the Ju 388); with the first three noted examples now at the Dulles International Airport-located NASM museum facility, the Steven F. Udvar-Hazy Center, the home of the new Mary Baker Engen Restoration Hangar, the NASM's latest primary restoration workshop.

== See also ==
- The Fedden Mission of the United Kingdom, tasked with similar fact-finding concerning the aircraft and technology of the defeated Luftwaffe
- Operation Big
- Technical Air Intelligence Unit similar missions in the Pacific war
- Operation Paperclip the search for German scientists
- The Luftfahrtforschungsanstalt in Völkenrode, a top secret German aviation technology facility, with no airfield of its own
- Eric "Winkle" Brown (1920-2016), the Royal Navy aviation officer who helped Watson obtain a number of aircraft
- Siegfried Knemeyer, a World War II German aviation technology expert who worked for the USAF after the war
- No. 1426 Flight RAF

== Bibliography ==
- Samuel, Wolfgang W. E. (2004). American Raiders: The Race to Capture the Luftwaffe's Secrets. University Press of Mississippi. ISBN 978-1-57806-649-0.
- Daso, Dik Alan. 2002. "Focus: The Shaft of the Spear - Operation LUSTY: The US Army Air Forces' Exploitation of the Luftwaffe's Secret Aeronautical Technology, 1944-45". Airpower Journal. 16, no. 1: 28.
- Daso, D. A. 2002. "Operation LUSTY: The US Army Air Forces' Exploitation of the Luftwaffe's Secret Aeronautical Technology, 1944-45". AEROSPACE POWER JOURNAL. 16: 28-40.
- Heaton, Colin D. The Me 262 Stormbird: From the Pilots Who Flew, Fought, and Survived It. Minneapolis: MBI Pub. Co, 2012.
- Hunt, M. La rafle des savants allemands ou l'opération "Lusty". Imprimeries Réunies S.A., 1953. <http://retro.seals.ch/digbib/view?rid=rms-001:1953:98::801 >.
- Young, R. L. 2005. "Operation Lusty Harold Watson's "Whizzers" Went Hunting for German Jets-and Came Back with Several Jewels". AIR FORCE MAGAZINE. 88: 62-67.
