= Operation Sea Horse =

Operation Sea Horse was the naval part of Operation Lusty. Lusty's purpose was to locate and recover top secret German weaponry, e.g. aircraft and weapons.

== Ship involvement ==
The escort aircraft carrier HMS Reaper took part in the operation, being used to ferry captured airframes. On 23 July 1945, Reaper left Cherbourg for Newark, New Jersey. The news of the Japanese surrender came through during the voyage.

== Aircraft captured ==
On the ocean voyage to Allied bases, the planes were covered in protective "shrink wrap'" to protect them from sea spray. It was reported that the following aircraft were captured:

- Ten Me 262s
- Five Focke-Wulf Fw 190 Fs
- Four Focke-Wulf Fw 190 Ds
- One Focke-Wulf Ta 152
- Four Arado Ar 234s
- Three Heinkel He 219s
- Three Messerschmitt Bf 109s
- Two Dornier Do 335s
- Two Bücker Bü 181s
- One Doblhoff WNF 342
- Two Flettner Fl 282s
- One Junkers Ju 88 G
- One Junkers Ju 388
- One Messerschmitt Bf 108
- One North American P-51 Mustang
- At least one Horten flying wing aircraft, including the nearly-completed Jumo 004 jet-powered Ho 229 V3 prototype, which resides at present at Paul Garber Preservation, Restoration, and Storage Facility in Suitland, Maryland

== Aircraft uses ==
In thanks for British help for providing the services of one of their aircraft carriers, the Americans gave them five Messerschmitt Me 262s for testing. The other five Messerschmitt Me 262s stayed with the AAF, and were flown to an airfield in Indiana known as Freeman Field where tests could be carried out relatively secretly. On 19 August, one of two Messerschmitt Me 262s travelling to Freeman Field via Pittsburgh crashed into a field during landing, with all that remained of the aircraft salvageable parts.

== See also ==
- Operation Paperclip
