= Querqueville Airfield =

Former airfield in France

Querqueville Airfield Advanced Landing Ground A-23

Site information
- Type: Military Airfield
- Owner: United States Army Air Forces

Location
- Coordinates: 49°40′07″N 001°41′48″W

Site history
- In use: 1930s-August 1945
- Battles/wars: Western Front (World War II)

Querqueville Airfield is a former airfield .4 km (0.25 mi) north-northwest of Querqueville in the Normandy region of France.

== History ==
The airfield was already in use before World War II and served as a training and research airfield for the Aeronavale. It was captured by the Germans after the Battle of France in May 1940, and was taken over by the Luftwaffe and became a German Fliegerhorst.

Fliegerhorst Querqueville was used by Jagdgeschwader 2 (JG 2) "Richthofen" during the Battle of Britain. It operated g Bf 109Es over the South Coast of England and the English Channel. Between 1940 and 1944 it was attacked several times by both the RAF and USAAF. Several French Potez 631 twin-engined fighters were captured by the Germans at the airfield, and were used for some time as decoys with German crosses painted on them. After they were destroyed by Allied aircraft, the Germans simply pushed them onto the beach.

After Cherbourg fell to US forces following a lengthy battle in June 1944, US IX Engineering Command, 830th Engineer Aviation Battalion began rebuilding the airfield. Assisted by 826 EAB they found and cleared 4500 landmines at the airfield. As the mines could not be detected by their mine detectors, this meant an extraordinary effort, for which several of the units' men were awarded Bronze Stars. The 830th EAB then proceeded to convert Querqueville into a transport airfield, designated ALG A-23. They constructed a large platform and managed to squeeze in a 4,600 by 120 feet (1,402 m × 37 m) runway. A hangar was repaired, only to be destroyed again by a B-17 in distress, and repaired a second time.

Immediately after the war it was used by both the RAF and USAAF 27th Air Transport Group (ATC) as the location where captured German military aircraft were brought to in preparation to the transport to the UK and USA as part of "Operation Lusty". The airfield closed on 8 August 1945.

It was handed over to the Aeronavale, who used it until 1948. It was then put on a Care and Maintenance status. It was finally struck off in 1966. A naval academy and a new suburb have been built over the site.
