= HMS Reaper =

1943 Ruler-class escort carrier of the Royal Navy

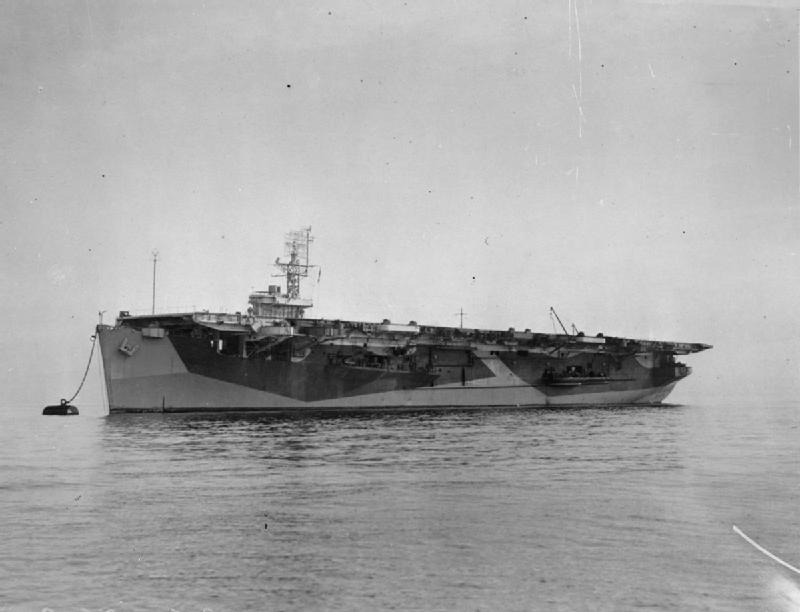
- HMS Reaper at Greenock in Scotland in September 1944

History

United States
- Name: USS Winjah
- Namesake: Winjah Bay in South Carolina
- Builder: Seattle-Tacoma Shipbuilding Corporation
- Laid down: 5 June 1943
- Launched: 22 November 1943
- Fate: Transferred to the Royal Navy

United Kingdom
- Name: HMS Reaper
- Commissioned: 18 February 1944
- Decommissioned: 2 July 1946
- Identification: Pennant number:D82
- Fate: Sold as a merchant ship; scrapped in 1967

General characteristics
- Class & type: Bogue-class escort carrier (US); Ruler-class escort carrier (UK)
- Displacement: 7,800 tons
- Length: 495 ft 8 in (151.08 m)
- Beam: 69 ft 6 in (21.18 m)
- Draught: 26 ft (7.9 m)
- Propulsion: Steam turbines, one shaft, 8,500 shp (6,300 kW)
- Speed: 17.5 knots (32.4 km/h)
- Complement: 890 officers and men
- Armament: 2 × 4"/50, 5"/38 or 5"/51 guns; 4 × twin 40 mm Bofors; 10 × single 20 mm Oerlikon
- Aircraft carried: 28

USS Winjah (CVE-54) (originally AVG-54, later ACV-54), was a Bogue-class escort carrier of the United States Navy, leased to the Royal Navy during World War II.

Winjah was laid down on 5 June 1943 at Tacoma, Washington, by Seattle-Tacoma Shipbuilding. She was assigned to the United Kingdom under lend-lease on 23 June; she was redesignated CVE-54 on 15 July; launched on 22 November; and delivered to the British on 18 February 1944. From March to August 1945 she was part of the British Pacific Fleet attached to the 30th Aircraft Carrier Squadron.

Renamed HMS Reaper (D82), the carrier operated in the Royal Navy for the duration of World War II. After arriving at Norfolk, Virginia, on 13 May 1946, Reaper was decommissioned on 20 May and returned to the United States Government. Authorized for disposal on 14 June, Winjah was struck from the Navy Registry on 8 July and sold to the Waterman Steamship Company of Mobile, Alabama, on 12 February 1947 as South Africa Star. She was scrapped in Japan in May 1967.

Just after World War II, Reaper was responsible for bringing from Cherbourg Harbour many examples of former German Luftwaffe aircraft captured by the American military's Operation Lusty over to North America, such as the sole examples of the Arado Ar 234 jet reconnaissance bomber, and the Heinkel He 219 night fighter, that exist in American aviation museums in the 21st century. The aircraft arrived by air from Germany to Querqueville Airfield which is under a kilometer away from Cherbourg.

== Design and description ==
These ships were larger and had a greater aircraft capacity than all the preceding American built escort carriers. They were also all laid down as escort carriers and not converted merchant ships. All the ships had a complement of 646 men and an overall length of 492 feet 3 inches (150.0 m), a beam of 69 feet 6 inches (21.2 m) and a draught of 25 ft 6 in (7.8 m). Propulsion was provided by two boilers and a steam turbine connected to one shaft, giving 9,350 shaft horsepower (SHP), which could propel the ship at 16.5 knots (30.6 km/h; 19.0 mph).

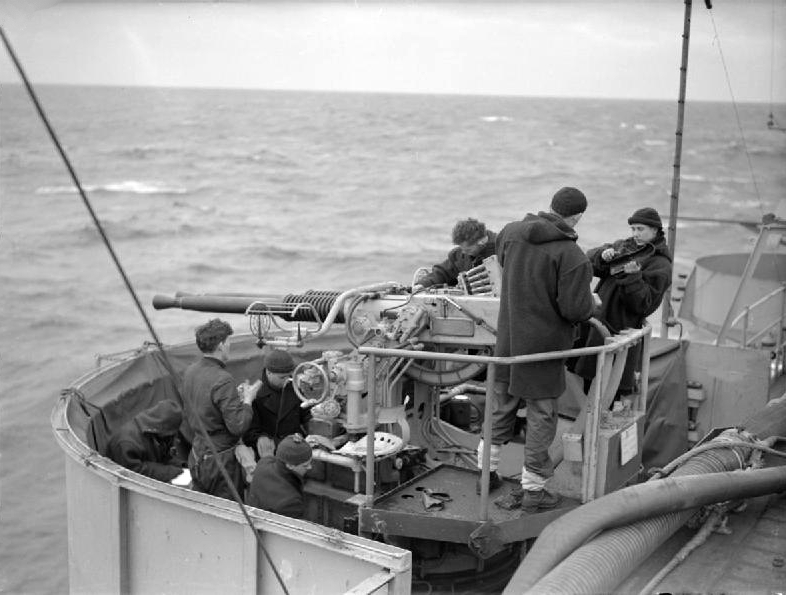
A typical twin 40 mm Bofors anti-aircraft gun

Aircraft facilities were a small combined bridge/flight control on the starboard side, two aircraft lifts 43 feet (13.1 m) by 34 feet (10.4 m), one aircraft catapult and nine arrestor wires. Aircraft could be housed in the 260 feet (79.2 m) by 62 feet (18.9 m) hangar below the flight deck. Her armament comprised: two 4"/50, 5"/38 or 5"/51 Dual Purpose guns in single mounts, sixteen 40 mm Bofors anti-aircraft guns in twin mounts and twenty 20 mm Oerlikon anti-aircraft cannons in single mounts. The ship had a maximum aircraft capacity of twenty-four aircraft which could be a mixture of Grumman Martlets, Vought F4U Corsairs or Hawker Sea Hurricane fighter aircraft and Fairey Swordfish or Grumman Avenger anti-submarine torpedo bombers.
