= Trondenes (disambiguation) =

Trondenes may refer to:

== Places ==
- Trondenes, a neighborhood in the town of Harstad in Harstad Municipality in Troms county, Norway
- Trondenes Municipality, a former municipality in Troms county, Norway
- Trondenes Fort, a fort in the town of Harstad in Harstad Municipality in Troms county, Norway
- Trondenes Church, a church in the neighborhood of Trondenes in the town of Harstad in Harstad Municipality in Troms county, Norway
- Trondenes Historical Center, a museum in the neighborhood of Trondenes in the town of Harstad in Harstad Municipality in Troms county, Norway

== Other ==
- Trondenes District Court, a district court based in the town of Harstad in Harstad Municipality in Troms county, Norway
- Trondenes prosti, a Church of Norway deanery based in the town of Harstad in Harstad Municipality in Troms county, Norway
