= Andrew V. Stoltenberg =

United States Navy Medal of Honor recipient

Andrew Vincent Stoltenberg
- Born: January 26, 1865; Harstad, Norway
- Died: December 25, 1921 (aged 56)
- Burial place: San Francisco National Cemetery, US
- Military career
- Allegiance: United States
- Branch: United States Navy
- Service years: 1890 – c. 1920
- Rank: Chief Gunner's Mate
- Units: USS Panay
- Conflicts: Philippine–American War
- Awards: Medal of Honor

Andrew Vincent Stoltenberg (January 26, 1865 – December 25, 1921) was a United States Navy sailor and a recipient of the Medal of Honor for his actions in the Philippine–American War.

== Biography ==
Andrew Vincent Stoltenberg was born in Aarnes, Trondenes, Norway. His father died when he was 4 years old and he was raised by an aunt and uncle. He left home as a young man and went to sea, arriving in the United States in 1882. In August 1890 he joined the United States Navy in San Francisco, California. He retired from the United States Navy after 30 years with the rate of Chief Gunner's Mate. He is buried in San Francisco National Cemetery.

== Medal of Honor citation ==
As a Gunner's Mate Second Class, Stoltenberg received the Medal "for distinguished conduct in the presence of the enemy in battle" at Catbalogan, Samar, Philippines, on July 16, 1900. Rank and organization: Gunner's Mate Second Class, U.S. Navy. Born: Boto, Norway. Accredited to: California. G.O. No.: 55, July 29, 1899.

Citation:

For distinguished conduct in the presence of the enemy in battle at Katbalogan, Samar, Philippine Islands, July 16, 1900.

== See also ==
- List of Philippine–American War Medal of Honor recipients
