= Anders Holte =

Norwegian sea captain

Anders Nikolai Holte (28 August 1849 – 11 May 1937) was a Norwegian sea captain and navigator.

== Biography ==
Holte was born at Oldra in Trondenes Municipality in Troms county, Norway. He was a son of fisherman Bertheus Andersen and his wife Maren Marie Eliasdatter. He was 14 years old when he first followed his father on fishing trips to Lofoten. The ferry service Vesteraalens Dampskibsselskab was founded by Richard With in 1881. In 1892 Holte was hired as a coastal pilot by the company. Holte was used in the planning of a passenger route from Bergen to Northern Norway and is credited with making a viable navigation system. He held this job from 1892 to 1903, when he became office manager. In 1903, Anders Holte was employed as a deputy - a position he held until 1910. He finished his career as coastal pilot from 1910 to 1933.

He also participated in the latter phase of Nansen's Fram expedition, piloting the ship in to Skjervøy and southwards to be greeted by King Oscar II in Kristiania. Holte also piloted the Royal Norwegian Navy gunboat HNoMS Sleipner, which on many occasions accompanied Wilhelm II of Germany on his vacations in Norway.

He chaired the regional branch of the Norwegian Society for Sea Rescue from 1894 to 1935. He was honoured with the King's Medal of Merit (Kongens fortjenstmedalje) in 1930.

== Personal life ==
In 1878 he married Else Marie Johansdatter (1854–1913). In 1885, they bought the Erikstad farm near the village of Kasfjord (in what is now Harstad Municipality). After the death of his first wife, he was married in 1917 to Indianna Elise Danielsen (1891–1989). He died during May 1937 in Harstad. A memorial stone was raised in his memory in the center of Harstad during 1980.
