= Elgsnes Chapel =

- Elgsnes kapell
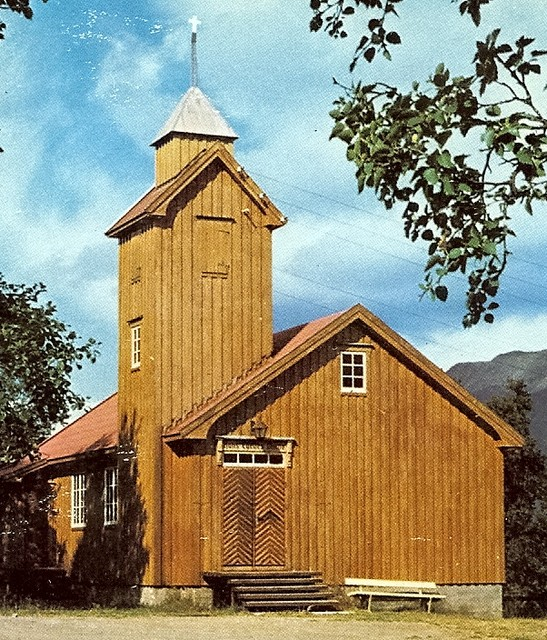
- View of the chapel
- Elgsnes Chapel
- 68.9117571°N 16.269724°E
- Location: Harstad Municipality, Troms
- Country: Norway
- Denomination: Church of Norway
- Churchmanship: Evangelical Lutheran

History
- Status: Chapel
- Founded: 1985
- Consecrated: 1985

Architecture
- Functional status: Active
- Architect: Ivar Tolo
- Architectural type: Long church
- Completed: 1985 (41 years ago)

Specifications
- Capacity: 100
- Materials: Wood

Administration
- Diocese: Nord-Hålogaland
- Deanery: Trondenes prosti
- Parish: Trondenes
- Norwegian Cultural Heritage Site
- Type: Church
- Status: Not protected
- ID: 84085

Elgsnes Chapel (Norwegian: Elgsnes kapell) is a chapel of the Church of Norway in Harstad Municipality in Troms county, Norway. It is located in the village of Elgsnes on the island of Hinnøya, just northwest of the town of Harstad. It is an annex chapel for the Trondenes parish which is part of the Trondenes prosti (deanery) in the Diocese of Nord-Hålogaland. The brown, wooden church was built in a long church style in 1985 using plans drawn up by the architect Ivar Tolo who was hired by Edvard Ruud. The church seats about 100 people.

The chapel was built as a memorial Hans Egede, the famous 17th-century missionary to Greenland who was from this part of Trondenes. As such, the chapel is often called Hans Egedes minne (Hans Egede's memorial).

== See also ==
- List of churches in Nord-Hålogaland
