= Landbrukstidende =

Norwegian agricultural magazine

Landbrukstidende is a Norwegian agricultural magazine. The magazine was established by Olav Dalsaune and Karl Hagerup in 1895, and is still one of Norwegian farmers' major sources of agro-news and agro-bulletins.

The magazine's circulation is 19.500 (Fagpressen, 2004). Annually there are 20 editions in a tabloid format. Ole T. Hofstad is managing editor.

Landbrukstidende's publisher, Landbrukssamvirkets Informasjonskontor Midt-Norge (LIM AS), is also responsible for the Norwegian agro news site Gardsplassen.no

Gardsplassen.no was established in 1997, and is today a daily provider of agro news to farmers in all parts of Norway.

The editorial staff for both Landbrukstidende and Gardsplassen.no is based in Trondheim, with a local office in Harstad.
