= Harstad Municipality =

Municipality in Troms, Norway

Harstad Municipality Harstad kommune Hársttáid suohkan
- Municipality
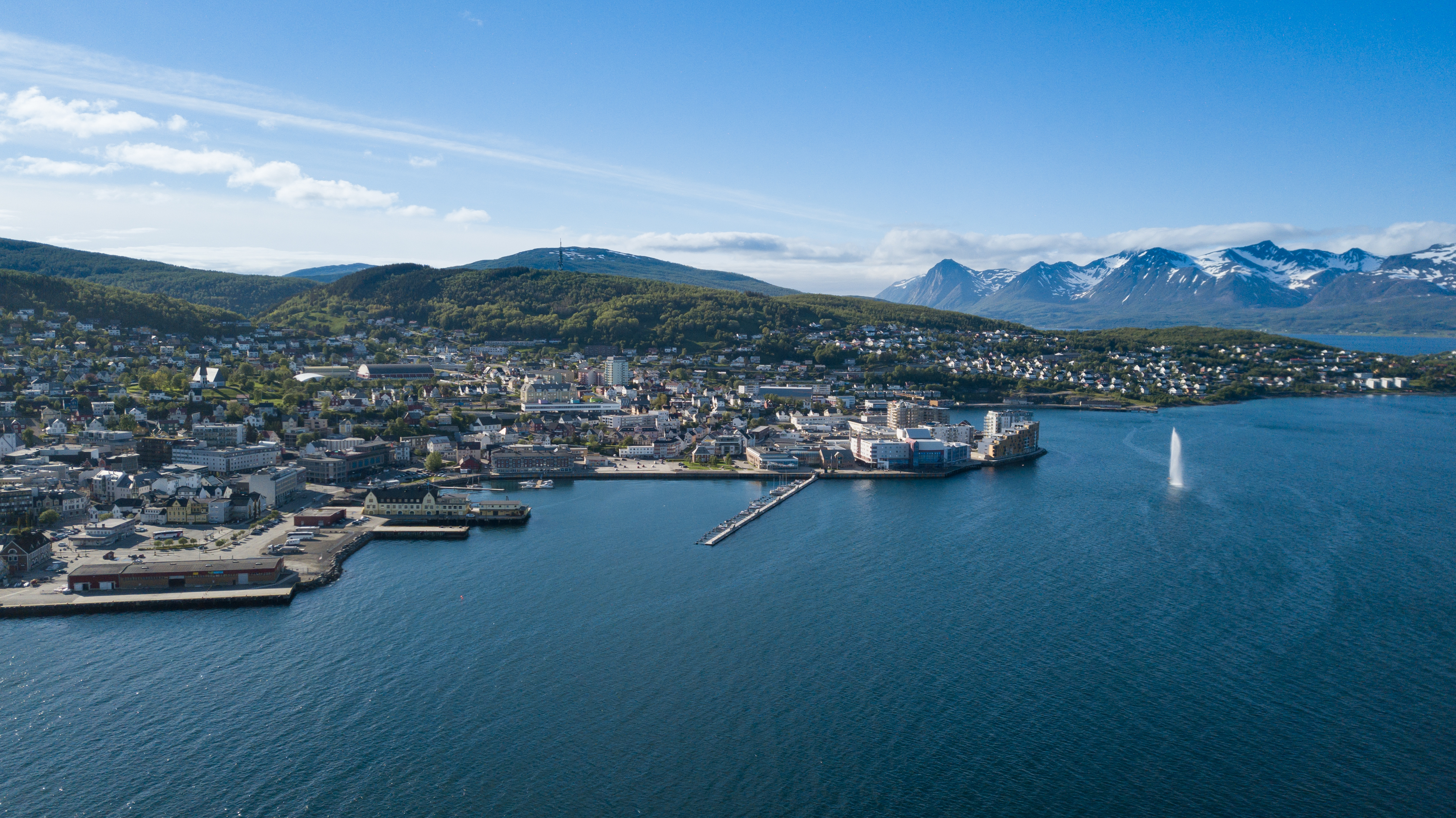
- Waterfront of Harstad

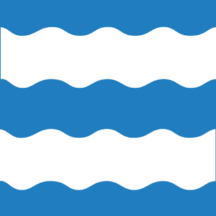
- Flag Coat of arms

- Troms within Norway

- Harstad within Troms
- Coordinates: 68°48′00″N 16°32′45″E
- Country: Norway
- County: Troms
- District: Central Hålogaland
- Established: 1 January 1904
  - Preceded by: Trondenes Municipality
- Administrative centre: Harstad

Government
  - Mayor (2025): Else Marie Stenhaug (Ap)

Area
  - Total: 445.27 km^{2} (171.92 sq mi)
  - Land: 428.48 km^{2} (165.44 sq mi)
  - Water: 16.79 km^{2} (6.48 sq mi) 3.8%
  - Rank: #225 in Norway
- Highest elevation: 1,094.8 m (3,592 ft)

Population (2024)
  - Total: 25,056
  - Rank: #49 in Norway
  - Density: 56.3/km^{2} (146/sq mi)
  - Change (10 years): ▲ +2.5%
- Demonym: Harstadværing

Official language
  - Norwegian form: Neutral
- Time zone: UTC+01:00 (CET)
  - Summer (DST): UTC+02:00 (CEST)
- ISO 3166 code: NO-5503
- Website: Official website

Harstad (Norwegian: [ˈhɑ̂ʂːʈɑ]; Northern Sami: Hárstták) is the second-most populated municipality in Troms county, Norway. It is mostly located on the large island of Hinnøya. The municipal center is the town of Harstad, which is the most populous town in Central Hålogaland and the third-largest in all of Northern Norway. The town was incorporated in 1904. Villages in the municipality include Elgsnes, Fauskevåg, Gausvika, Grøtavær, Kasfjord, Lundenes, Nergården and Sørvika.

The 445-square-kilometre (172 sq mi) municipality is the 225th largest by area out of Norway's 357 municipalities and the 49th most populous, with a population of 25,056. The municipality's population density is 56.3 inhabitants per square kilometre (146/sq mi) and the population has increased by 2.5% over the previous 10-year period.

== Geography ==
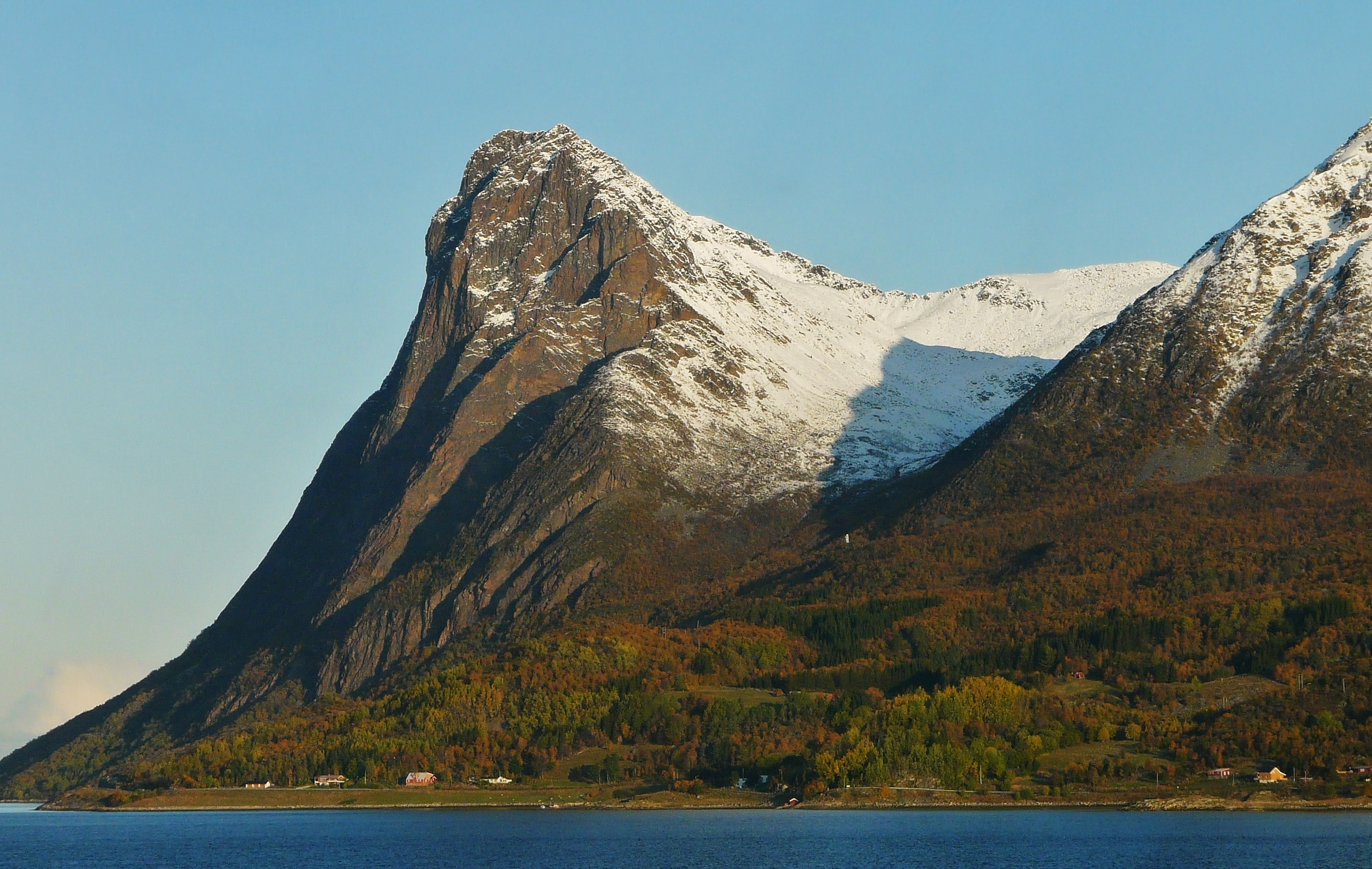
Toppen (mountain on Grytøya, October 2009).

The municipality is located on many islands in southern Troms county. Most of the municipality is located on the large island of Hinnøya, which is Norway's largest coastal island (three islands in the Svalbard archipelago are larger). The northern part of the municipality is located on the smaller islands of Grytøya, Bjarkøya, Sandsøya, Helløya, Flatøya and Krøttøya and many even smaller islands between the Andfjorden (to the west) and the Vågsfjorden (to the east). The municipality contains several small islands, including Arnøya, Gressholman, Helløya, Kjeøya, Kjøtta, Kjøttakalven, Flatøya, Meløyvær, Måga, Rogla, Lille Rogla and Åkerøya.

Harstad is bordered by Kvæfjord Municipality to the west. To the south and east, the Tjeldsund Bridge connects Hinnøya with Tjeldsund Municipality and the mainland across Tjeldsundet, and to the northeast is the Vågsfjorden, where Harstad shares a water border with Ibestad Municipality. The city of Harstad itself is located on the northeastern part of Hinnøya; it is the only city on the island, and is popularly known as Vågsfjordens perle (The pearl of Vågsfjorden).

The highest point in Harstad Municipality is Sætertinden, which is 1,095 m (3,593 ft) above sea level. It is located near the village of Sandtorg in southern Harstad. The 412-metre (1,352 ft) tall mountain, Nupen, is located in the northwestern part of the municipality on the border with Kvæfjord.

=== Climate and light ===
Despite being located north of the Arctic Circle, Harstad features either a dry-summer subarctic climate (Köppen climate classification: Dsc), or (barely, by only half a degree C) the rare cold-summer mediterranean climate (Köppen climate classification: Csc), depending on if the 0 °C (32 °F) or the −3 °C (27 °F) isotherm is used. Harstad features relatively mild, wet winters and cool, dry summers. Harstad does not have the brutal winters most locations north of the Arctic Circle experience, and is sheltered from Atlantic gales by mountains in the west, and has the main part of the Scandinavian Mountains to the east. The city experiences warmer winters than major cities located 25 degrees farther south in latitude such as Beijing, Chicago and Toronto. Summers in Harstad are cool, with average high temperatures seldom breaking the 22 °C (72 °F) mark. Since the weather station opened August 2002, July 2014 was the warmest month with mean 16.9 °C (62 °F), average daily high 21.8 °C (71 °F) and all-time high 31.7 °C (89 °F) on 10 July. The record low of −16.1 °C (3 °F) was recorded in February 2010. The coldest month recorded was January 2003 with mean −6.5 °C (20 °F) and average daily low −9.5 °C (15 °F). On 9. September 2024 Harstad recorded high 25.9 °C (79 °F), the warmest temperature in September recorded in Troms.

From early May to early August, the municipality experiences twilight for only a few hours each night as the sun just dips below the horizon, so there is no darkness. Within this period, from 22 May to 18 July, the municipality enjoys the midnight sun. The polar night, when the sun is always below the horizon, lasts from 30 November to 12 January. At this time, there are 3–4 hours of dawn and dusk around noon, sometimes with colourful skies towards the south. From late January, the period of daylight rapidly increases, reaching 12 hours by March and 18 hours in April. Harstad is located in the midst of the aurora borealis (a.k.a. the northern lights) zone, and the aurora can often be seen on clear nights, but not in summer due to the continuous daylight.

Climate data for Harstad stadion 1991-2020 (45 m, avg high/low 2007-2025, extremes 2002–2025)
Month	Jan	Feb	Mar	Apr	May	Jun	Jul	Aug	Sep	Oct	Nov	Dec	Year
Record high °C (°F)	8.8 (47.8)	9.2 (48.6)	10.9 (51.6)	16.9 (62.4)	24.7 (76.5)	29.6 (85.3)	31.7 (89.1)	31.5 (88.7)	25.9 (78.6)	17.5 (63.5)	13.8 (56.8)	9.8 (49.6)	31.7 (89.1)
Mean daily maximum °C (°F)	0.2 (32.4)	0.5 (32.9)	2.3 (36.1)	5.5 (41.9)	10.5 (50.9)	14.2 (57.6)	17.6 (63.7)	16.4 (61.5)	12.7 (54.9)	7.1 (44.8)	3.6 (38.5)	1.6 (34.9)	7.7 (45.8)
Daily mean °C (°F)	−1.8 (28.8)	−2.2 (28.0)	−0.7 (30.7)	2.4 (36.3)	6.6 (43.9)	9.9 (49.8)	13.2 (55.8)	12.4 (54.3)	8.9 (48.0)	4.3 (39.7)	1.4 (34.5)	−0.5 (31.1)	4.5 (40.1)
Mean daily minimum °C (°F)	−4.5 (23.9)	−4.3 (24.3)	−3.1 (26.4)	−0.4 (31.3)	3.9 (39.0)	7.7 (45.9)	10.6 (51.1)	10.1 (50.2)	7 (45)	2.6 (36.7)	−0.7 (30.7)	−2.9 (26.8)	2.2 (35.9)
Record low °C (°F)	−15.4 (4.3)	−16.1 (3.0)	−13.3 (8.1)	−9.4 (15.1)	−3.7 (25.3)	−0.6 (30.9)	4.6 (40.3)	1.7 (35.1)	−1.6 (29.1)	−7.9 (17.8)	−10.3 (13.5)	−14.5 (5.9)	−16.1 (3.0)
Average precipitation mm (inches)	129 (5.1)	95 (3.7)	100 (3.9)	53 (2.1)	44 (1.7)	39 (1.5)	55 (2.2)	58 (2.3)	77 (3.0)	94 (3.7)	78 (3.1)	90 (3.5)	912 (35.8)
Source 1: Seklima
Source 2:

== History ==
The town of Harstad was established as a municipality on 1 January 1904 when it was separated from the large Trondenes Municipality because it had just been declared a ladested (small seaport). The initial population of the town of Harstad was 1,246. During the 1960s, there were many municipal mergers across Norway due to the work of the Schei Committee. On 1 January 1964, the town of Harstad (population: 3,808) was merged with neighboring Sandtorg Municipality (population: 7,512) and Trondenes Municipality (population: 6,567) to form a new, larger Harstad Municipality with a population of 17,882. Prior to the merger, the town of Harstad had 3,808 residents. On 1 January 2013, the neighboring Bjarkøy Municipality (to the north) was merged with Harstad, forming a new, larger Harstad Municipality.

On 1 January 2020, the municipality became part of the new Troms og Finnmark county which replaced the old Troms county. On 1 January 2024, the Troms og Finnmark county was divided and the municipality once again became part of Troms county.

In recent years, a 3000-year-old bronze axe and a 2600-year-old bronze collar have been found at the Trondenes peninsula, just north of the city center. These, together with the burial cairns built close to the sea, are indications of a well-developed Bronze Age culture in the Harstad area.

There is also substantial archeological evidence of a well-developed Iron Age culture in the area, around 200 AD.

Trondenes is mentioned in the Heimskringla as a power centre in the Viking Age and a place to meet and discuss important issues (Trondarting). In 2020 archeologist concluded that Sandtorg, located along the Tjeldsundet strait, south of the town of Harstad, was the location of the only known Viking Age trading place in Northern Norway. The Tjeldsundet strait was very likely an important ship lane back then as it still is today.

Trondenes Church, the world's northernmost medieval church, which dates back to the 13th–15th century, is situated just outside the town.

Adjacent to the church is the Trondenes Historical Center and nearby is the Adolf Gun, an enormous land-based cannon from World War II, and the last of four cannons originally constructed by the Nazis. Harstad is one of the few towns in this part of Norway which were left largely undamaged by World War II.

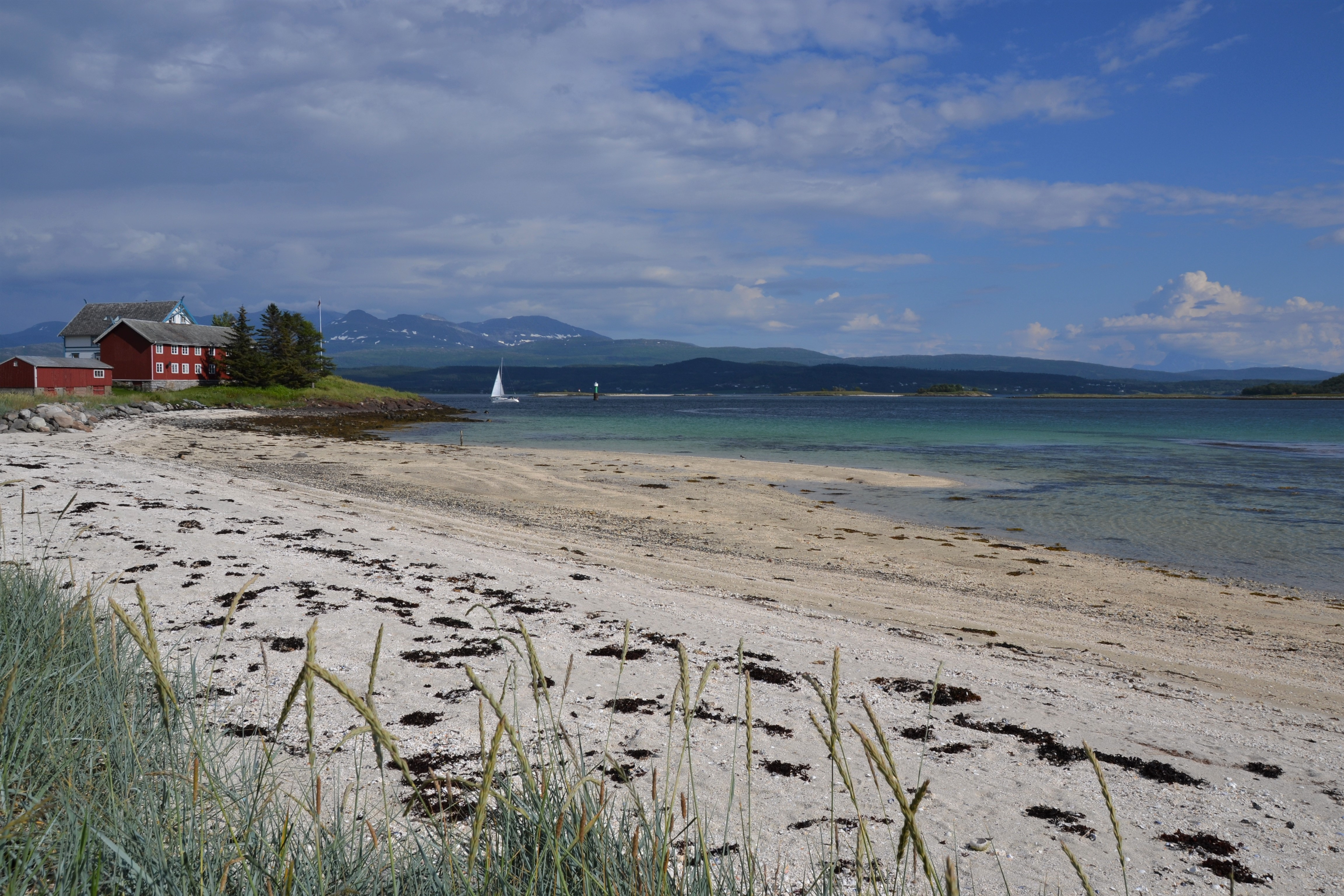
Sandtorg, where a trading place from the Viking age was located

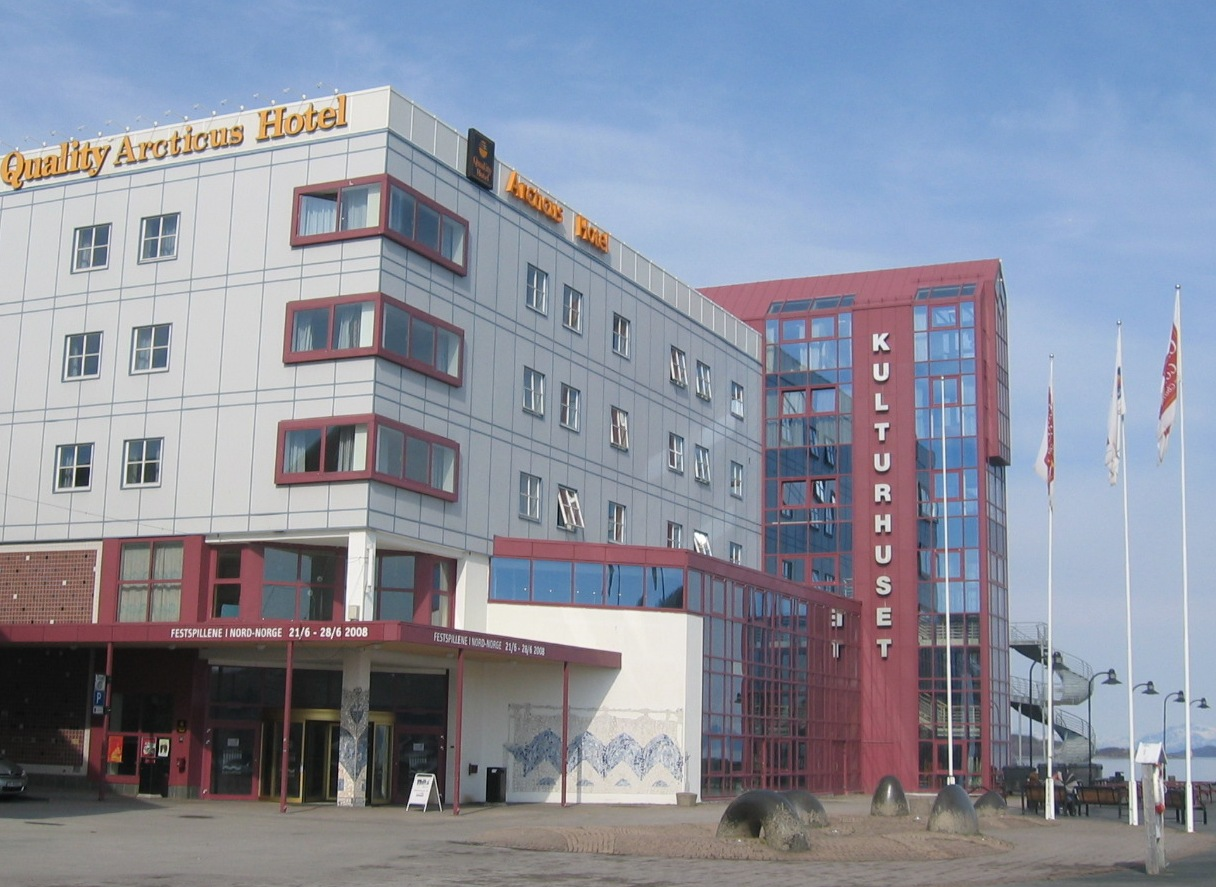
Harstad Kulturhus (culture house)

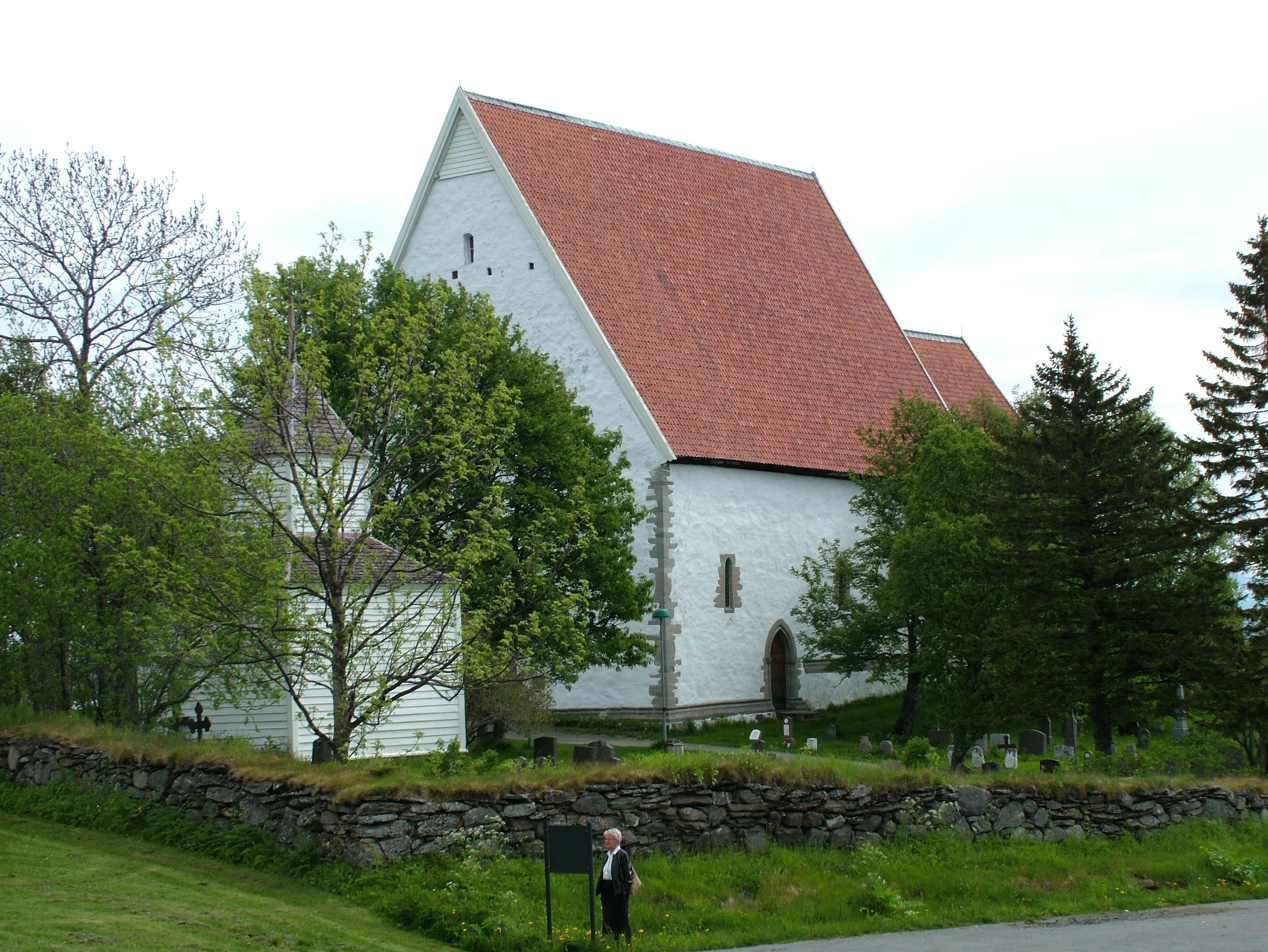
Trondenes Church at Trondenes.

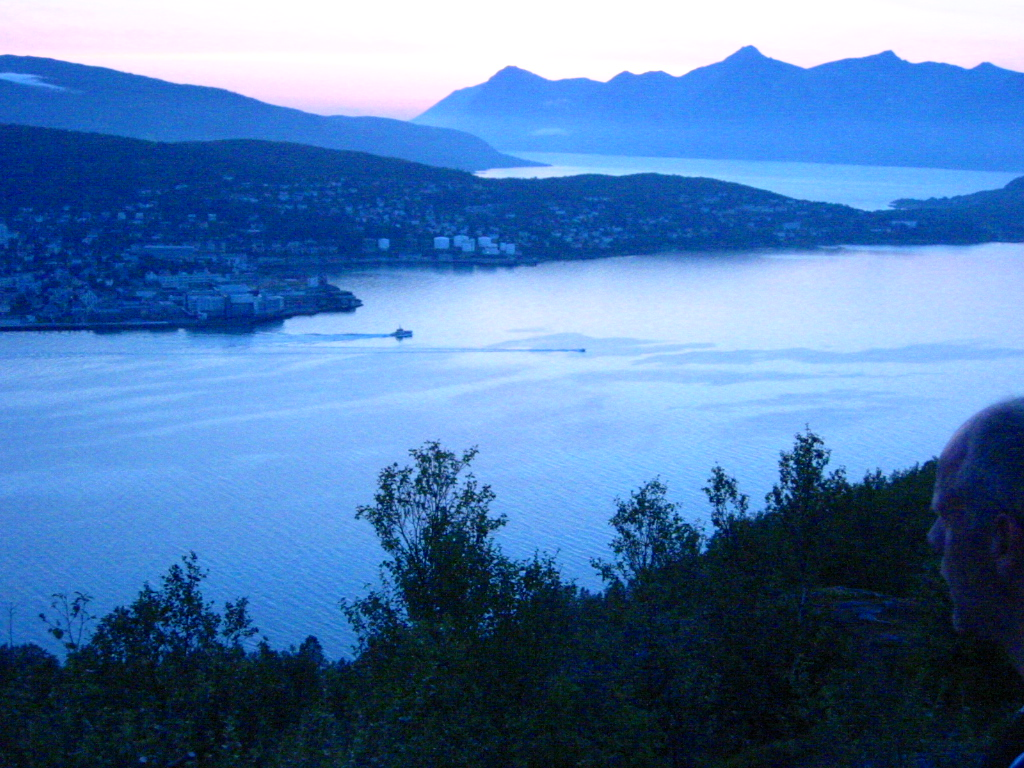
Northern part of Harstad at night, early August. View towards north-west from Gangsåstoppen

=== Origin of the name ===
The municipality (and town) is named after the old Harstad farm (Old Norse: Harðarstaðir), since the town is built where the farm once was located. The first element is (probably) the genitive case of the male name Hǫrðr. The last element is staðir which means "homestead" or "farm". On 6 February 2017, the municipality of Harstad adopted a co-equal Sami language name for the municipality: Hárstták. The Sami language name spelling changes depending on how it is used. It is called Hárstták when it is spelled alone, but it is Hársttáid suohkan when using the Sami language equivalent to "Harstad municipality".

=== Coat of arms ===
The coat of arms was granted on 24 April 1953. The official blazon is "Azure, two bars wavy argent" (Norwegian: To bølgende sølv bjelker på blå bunn). This means the arms have a blue field (background) and the charge is two wavy bars. The bars have a tincture of argent which means they are commonly colored white, but if it is made out of metal, then silver is used. The blue color in the field symbolizes the importance of sea and the wavy bars were chosen to represent the waves in the sea. Since the town of Harstad is located in the municipality, a mural crown is typically shown above the shield. The arms were designed by Jardar Lunde in cooperation with Hallvard Træteberg.

== Government ==
Harstad Municipality is responsible for primary education (through 10th grade), outpatient health services, senior citizen services, welfare and other social services, zoning, economic development, and municipal roads and utilities. The municipality is governed by a municipal council of directly elected representatives. The mayor is indirectly elected by a vote of the municipal council. The municipality is under the jurisdiction of the Midtre Hålogaland District Court and the Hålogaland Court of Appeal.

=== Municipal council ===
The municipal council (Kommunestyre) of Harstad Municipality is made up of 35 representatives that are elected to four-year terms. The tables below show the current and historical composition of the council by political party.

Harstad kommunestyre 2023–2027
Party name (in Norwegian)	Number of representatives
Labour Party (Arbeiderpartiet)	11
Progress Party (Fremskrittspartiet)	6
Green Party (Miljøpartiet De Grønne)	1
Conservative Party (Høyre)	7
Industry and Business Party (Industri‑ og Næringspartiet)	2
Christian Democratic Party (Kristelig Folkeparti)	1
Red Party (Rødt)	2
Centre Party (Senterpartiet)	2
Socialist Left Party (Sosialistisk Venstreparti)	2
Liberal Party (Venstre)	1
Total number of members:	35

Harstad kommunestyre 2019–2023
Party name (in Norwegian)	Number of representatives
Labour Party (Arbeiderpartiet)	11
Progress Party (Fremskrittspartiet)	5
Green Party (Miljøpartiet De Grønne)	2
Conservative Party (Høyre)	6
Christian Democratic Party (Kristelig Folkeparti)	1
Red Party (Rødt)	1
Centre Party (Senterpartiet)	6
Socialist Left Party (Sosialistisk Venstreparti)	2
Liberal Party (Venstre)	1
Total number of members:	35

Harstad kommunestyre 2015–2019
Party name (in Norwegian)	Number of representatives
Labour Party (Arbeiderpartiet)	13
Progress Party (Fremskrittspartiet)	8
Green Party (Miljøpartiet De Grønne)	1
Conservative Party (Høyre)	4
Christian Democratic Party (Kristelig Folkeparti)	1
Red Party (Rødt)	1
Centre Party (Senterpartiet)	2
Socialist Left Party (Sosialistisk Venstreparti)	1
Liberal Party (Venstre)	4
Total number of members:	35

Harstad kommunestyre 2011–2015
Party name (in Norwegian)	Number of representatives
Labour Party (Arbeiderpartiet)	10
Progress Party (Fremskrittspartiet)	12
Conservative Party (Høyre)	5
Christian Democratic Party (Kristelig Folkeparti)	1
Red Party (Rødt)	1
Centre Party (Senterpartiet)	3
Socialist Left Party (Sosialistisk Venstreparti)	1
Liberal Party (Venstre)	2
Total number of members:	35

Harstad kommunestyre 2007–2011
Party name (in Norwegian)	Number of representatives
Labour Party (Arbeiderpartiet)	13
Progress Party (Fremskrittspartiet)	10
Conservative Party (Høyre)	10
Christian Democratic Party (Kristelig Folkeparti)	1
Red Electoral Alliance (Rød Valgallianse)	2
Centre Party (Senterpartiet)	4
Socialist Left Party (Sosialistisk Venstreparti)	2
Liberal Party (Venstre)	1
Total number of members:	43

Harstad kommunestyre 2003–2007
Party name (in Norwegian)	Number of representatives
Labour Party (Arbeiderpartiet)	14
Progress Party (Fremskrittspartiet)	8
Conservative Party (Høyre)	7
Christian Democratic Party (Kristelig Folkeparti)	2
Red Electoral Alliance (Rød Valgallianse)	1
Centre Party (Senterpartiet)	4
Socialist Left Party (Sosialistisk Venstreparti)	6
Liberal Party (Venstre)	1
Total number of members:	43

Harstad kommunestyre 1999–2003
Party name (in Norwegian)	Number of representatives
Labour Party (Arbeiderpartiet)	22
Progress Party (Fremskrittspartiet)	6
Conservative Party (Høyre)	14
Christian Democratic Party (Kristelig Folkeparti)	3
Red Electoral Alliance (Rød Valgallianse)	2
Centre Party (Senterpartiet)	3
Socialist Left Party (Sosialistisk Venstreparti)	3
Liberal Party (Venstre)	2
Total number of members:	55

Harstad kommunestyre 1995–1999
Party name (in Norwegian)	Number of representatives
Labour Party (Arbeiderpartiet)	22
Progress Party (Fremskrittspartiet)	5
Conservative Party (Høyre)	16
Christian Democratic Party (Kristelig Folkeparti)	3
Red Electoral Alliance (Rød Valgallianse)	1
Centre Party (Senterpartiet)	4
Socialist Left Party (Sosialistisk Venstreparti)	2
Liberal Party (Venstre)	2
Total number of members:	55

Harstad kommunestyre 1991–1995
Party name (in Norwegian)	Number of representatives
Labour Party (Arbeiderpartiet)	18
Progress Party (Fremskrittspartiet)	3
Conservative Party (Høyre)	19
Christian Democratic Party (Kristelig Folkeparti)	2
Red Electoral Alliance (Rød Valgallianse)	1
Centre Party (Senterpartiet)	4
Socialist Left Party (Sosialistisk Venstreparti)	6
Liberal Party (Venstre)	2
Total number of members:	55

Harstad kommunestyre 1987–1991
Party name (in Norwegian)	Number of representatives
Labour Party (Arbeiderpartiet)	20
Progress Party (Fremskrittspartiet)	7
Conservative Party (Høyre)	18
Christian Democratic Party (Kristelig Folkeparti)	2
Red Electoral Alliance (Rød Valgallianse)	1
Centre Party (Senterpartiet)	1
Socialist Left Party (Sosialistisk Venstreparti)	3
Liberal Party (Venstre)	3
Total number of members:	55

Harstad kommunestyre 1983–1987
Party name (in Norwegian)	Number of representatives
Labour Party (Arbeiderpartiet)	20
Progress Party (Fremskrittspartiet)	4
Conservative Party (Høyre)	21
Christian Democratic Party (Kristelig Folkeparti)	3
Red Electoral Alliance (Rød Valgallianse)	1
Centre Party (Senterpartiet)	1
Socialist Left Party (Sosialistisk Venstreparti)	3
Liberal Party (Venstre)	2
Total number of members:	55

Harstad kommunestyre 1979–1983
Party name (in Norwegian)	Number of representatives
Labour Party (Arbeiderpartiet)	20
Progress Party (Fremskrittspartiet)	1
Conservative Party (Høyre)	23
Christian Democratic Party (Kristelig Folkeparti)	4
Red Electoral Alliance (Rød Valgallianse)	1
Centre Party (Senterpartiet)	2
Socialist Left Party (Sosialistisk Venstreparti)	2
Liberal Party (Venstre)	2
Total number of members:	55

Harstad kommunestyre 1975–1979
Party name (in Norwegian)	Number of representatives
Labour Party (Arbeiderpartiet)	19
Conservative Party (Høyre)	22
Christian Democratic Party (Kristelig Folkeparti)	5
Centre Party (Senterpartiet)	4
Socialist Left Party (Sosialistisk Venstreparti)	2
Liberal Party (Venstre)	3
Total number of members:	55

Harstad kommunestyre 1971–1975
Party name (in Norwegian)	Number of representatives
Labour Party (Arbeiderpartiet)	24
Conservative Party (Høyre)	19
Christian Democratic Party (Kristelig Folkeparti)	2
Centre Party (Senterpartiet)	4
Socialist People's Party (Sosialistisk Folkeparti)	3
Liberal Party (Venstre)	3
Total number of members:	55

Harstad kommunestyre 1967–1971
Party name (in Norwegian)	Number of representatives
Labour Party (Arbeiderpartiet)	25
Conservative Party (Høyre)	21
Christian Democratic Party (Kristelig Folkeparti)	1
Centre Party (Senterpartiet)	2
Socialist People's Party (Sosialistisk Folkeparti)	2
Liberal Party (Venstre)	4
Total number of members:	55

Harstad kommunestyre 1963–1967
Party name (in Norwegian)	Number of representatives
Labour Party (Arbeiderpartiet)	27
Conservative Party (Høyre)	18
Christian Democratic Party (Kristelig Folkeparti)	2
Centre Party (Senterpartiet)	2
Socialist People's Party (Sosialistisk Folkeparti)	1
Liberal Party (Venstre)	5
Total number of members:	55
Note: On 1 January 1964, Trondenes Municipality and Sandtorg Municipality became part of Harstad Municipality.

Harstad bystyre 1959–1963
Party name (in Norwegian)	Number of representatives
Labour Party (Arbeiderpartiet)	9
Conservative Party (Høyre)	17
Liberal Party (Venstre)	3
Total number of members:	29

Harstad bystyre 1955–1959
Party name (in Norwegian)	Number of representatives
Labour Party (Arbeiderpartiet)	10
Conservative Party (Høyre)	15
Communist Party (Kommunistiske Parti)	1
Liberal Party (Venstre)	3
Total number of members:	29

Harstad bystyre 1951–1955
Party name (in Norwegian)	Number of representatives
Labour Party (Arbeiderpartiet)	10
Conservative Party (Høyre)	10
Communist Party (Kommunistiske Parti)	3
Liberal Party (Venstre)	4
Local List(s) (Lokale lister)	1
Total number of members:	28

Harstad bystyre 1947–1951
Party name (in Norwegian)	Number of representatives
Labour Party (Arbeiderpartiet)	9
Conservative Party (Høyre)	9
Communist Party (Kommunistiske Parti)	6
Liberal Party (Venstre)	4
Total number of members:	28

Harstad bystyre 1945–1947
Party name (in Norwegian)	Number of representatives
Labour Party (Arbeiderpartiet)	7
Conservative Party (Høyre)	6
Communist Party (Kommunistiske Parti)	9
Liberal Party (Venstre)	3
Joint List(s) of Non-Socialist Parties (Borgerlige Felleslister)	3
Total number of members:	28

Harstad bystyre 1937–1941*
Party name (in Norwegian)	Number of representatives
Labour Party (Arbeiderpartiet)	8
Liberal Party (Venstre)	3
Joint list of the Conservative Party (Høyre) and the Free-minded People's Party (Frisinnede Folkeparti)	12
List of workers, fishermen, and small farmholders (Arbeidere, fiskere, småbrukere liste)	3
Local List(s) (Lokale lister)	2
Total number of members:	28
Note: Due to the German occupation of Norway during World War II, no elections were held for new municipal councils until after the war ended in 1945.

Harstad bystyre 1934–1937
Party name (in Norwegian)	Number of representatives
Labour Party (Arbeiderpartiet)	10
Communist Party (Kommunistiske Parti)	4
Liberal Party (Venstre)	3
Joint list of the Conservative Party (Høyre) and the Free-minded People's Party (Frisinnede Folkeparti)	8
Local List(s) (Lokale lister)	3
Total number of members:	28

Harstad bystyre 1931–1934
Party name (in Norwegian)	Number of representatives
Labour Party (Arbeiderpartiet)	8
Temperance Party (Avholdspartiet)	1
Communist Party (Kommunistiske Parti)	6
Liberal Party (Venstre)	5
Joint list of the Conservative Party (Høyre) and the Free-minded People's Party (Frisinnede Folkeparti)	8
Total number of members:	28

Harstad bystyre 1928–1931
Party name (in Norwegian)	Number of representatives
Labour Party (Arbeiderpartiet)	8
Temperance Party (Avholdspartiet)	1
Communist Party (Kommunistiske Parti)	6
Liberal Party (Venstre)	5
Joint list of the Conservative Party (Høyre) and the Free-minded Liberal Party (Frisinnede Venstre)	6
Local List(s) (Lokale lister)	2
Total number of members:	28

Harstad bystyre 1925–1928
Party name (in Norwegian)	Number of representatives
Labour Party (Arbeiderpartiet)	7
Temperance Party (Avholdspartiet)	4
Communist Party (Kommunistiske Parti)	5
Liberal Party (Venstre)	3
Joint list of the Conservative Party (Høyre) and the Free-minded Liberal Party (Frisinnede Venstre)	7
Local List(s) (Lokale lister)	2
Total number of members:	28

Harstad bystyre 1922–1925
Party name (in Norwegian)	Number of representatives
Labour Party (Arbeiderpartiet)	5
Temperance Party (Avholdspartiet)	4
Social Democratic Labour Party (Socialdemokratiske Arbeiderparti)	1
Liberal Party (Venstre)	3
Joint list of the Conservative Party (Høyre) and the Free-minded Liberal Party (Frisinnede Venstre)	9
Joint List(s) of Non-Socialist Parties (Borgerlige Felleslister)	6
Total number of members:	28

=== Mayors ===
The mayor (Norwegian: ordfører) of Harstad Municipality is the political leader of the municipality and the chairperson of the municipal council. Here is a list of people who have held this position:

- 1904–1906: Hans Buck (H)
- 1914–1916: Karl Eystein Kvam (V)
- 1929–1932: Israel Wulff (Ap)
- 1932–1935: Nils J. Hunstad (H)
- 1935–1938: Hans Stordahl (Ap)
- 1938–1940: Nils J. Hunstad (H)
- 1941–1945: Hans Methi (NS)
- 1945–1945: Odd Gangnæs (NS)
- 1945–1945: Alf Haaland (V)
- 1945–1945: Nils J. Hunstad (H)
- 1946–1947: Sigurd Simensen (NKP)
- 1948–1952: Sigurd Torgersen (Ap)
- 1952–1964: Leif Bothner (H)
- 1964–1968: Bjarne Berg-Sæther (Ap)
- 1968–1969: Leif Arne Heløe (H)
- 1970–1977: Arnljot Norwich (H)
- 1978–1987: Johan Nordvik (H)
- 1987–1993: Kjell Joachimsen (H)
- 1993–1995: Britt S. Nordlund (H)
- 1995–1998: Helge Aune (Ap)
- 1998–2007: Halvar Hansen (Ap)
- 2007–2011: Helge Eriksen (H)
- 2011–2019: Marianne Bremnes (Ap)
- 2019–present: Kari-Anne Opsal (Ap)

== Economy ==
The oil industry of North Norway is centered in Harstad; including Statoil's main office for a new operational area for Northern Norway, the DNV office for Northern Norway, as well as other regional offices including TotalEnergies, Det Norske Oljeselskap ASA and Aibel. Harstad also has shipyards and other industries that are important for the economy. Harstad and the surrounding area have traditionally been among the most productive agricultural regions in Northern Norway. The old seabed, now dry land due to isostatic rebound (up to 60 to 80 metres or 200 to 260 feet above sea level), creating fertile soil that is well-suited for farming.

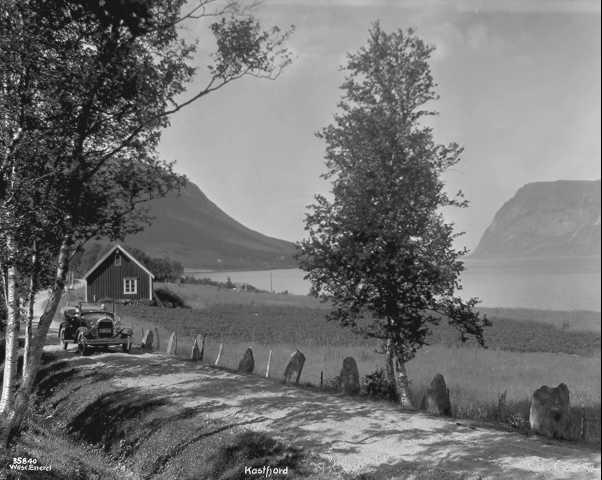
Agricultural area in Harstad; 1930.

== Institutions and culture ==
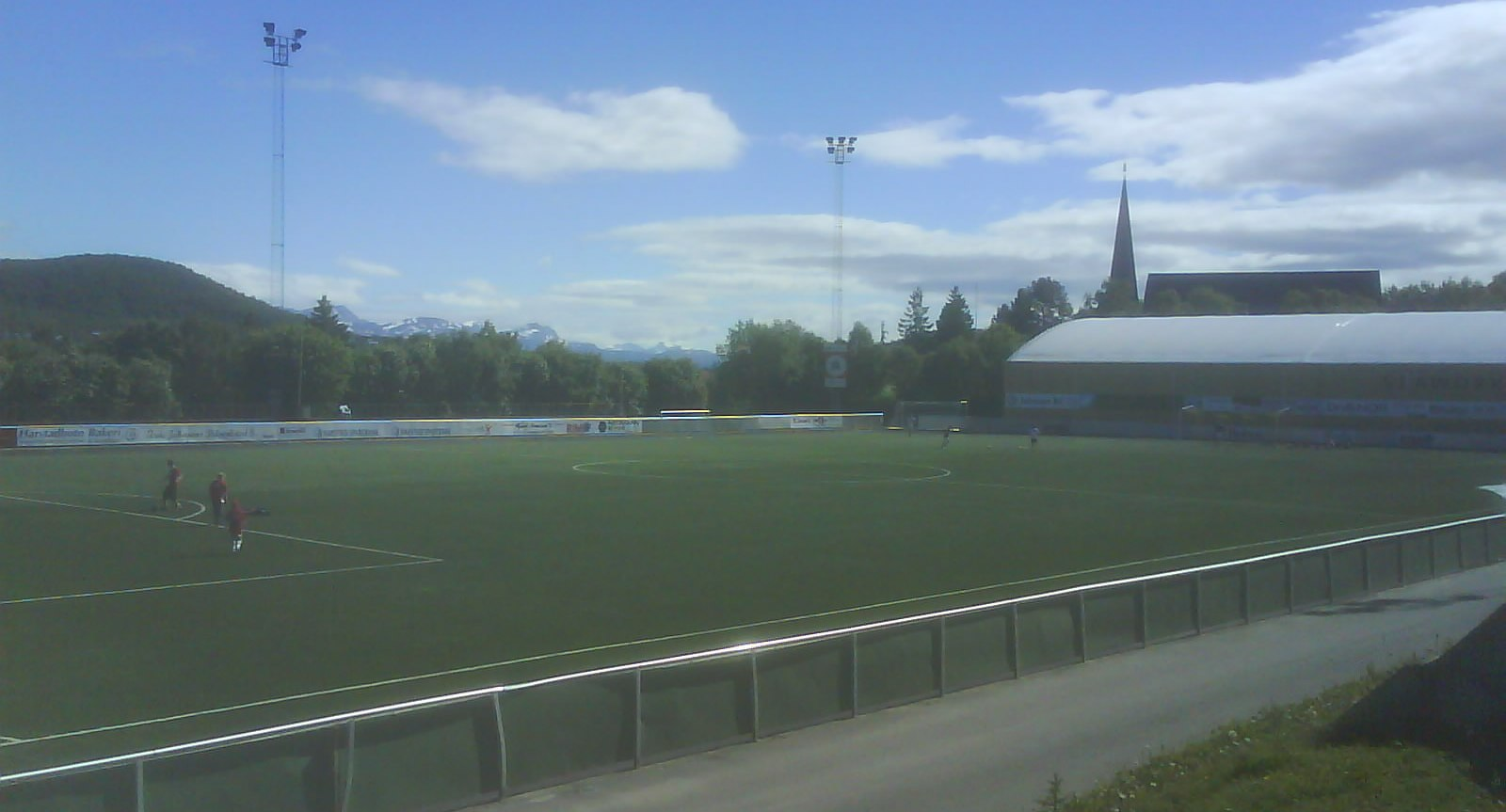
Harstad Stadium; June 2007

The city hosts the annual week-long Festival of North Norway in June. It is also the home of the Arctic Moving Image and Film Festival, held in October each year.

Harstad University College, with approximately 1,100 students, has a foreign exchange program inviting students globally. The hospital in Harstad is part of the University Hospital of North Norway.

The most successful local football team is Harstad Idrettslag (a.k.a. HIL), and the most successful basketball team is the Harstad Vikings.

Harstad is home port for the Anna Rogde, the world's oldest sailing schooner, also known as the sailing queen of Norway.

Harstad Camping is a campsite located in the municipality.

=== Churches ===
The Church of Norway has five parishes (sokn) within Harstad Municipality. It is part of the Trondenes prosti (deanery) in the Diocese of Nord-Hålogaland.

Churches in Harstad Municipality
Parish (sokn)	Church name	Location of the church	Year built
Bjarkøy og Sandsøy	Bjarkøy Church	Nergården	1766
Bjarkøy og Sandsøy	Sandsøy Church	Sandsøya	1888
Grytøy	Grøtavær Church	Grøtavær	1915
Grytøy	Lundenes Church	Lundenes	1974
Harstad	Harstad Church	Harstad	1958
Kanebogen	Kanebogen Church	Kanebogen	1999
Sandtorg	Gausvik Church	Gausvika	1979
Sandtorg	Sandtorg Church	Sørvika	1932
Trondenes	Trondenes Church	Trondenes	15th century
Trondenes	Elgsnes Chapel	Elgsnes	1985

== Military connections ==
Harstad traditionally has strong ties with the Norwegian Armed Forces. Kystjegerkommandoen (Coastal Ranger Command) has its home base at Trondenes, just north of the town of Harstad. Marinejegerkommandoen is based in Ramsund, a village in neighboring Tjeldsund Municipality on the mainland south of Harstad. General Carl Gustav Fleischer led the field operations of the Norwegian Armed Forces in World War II, among them the 7,500 soldiers which from the north pushed the Nazi Germans back to Narvik and participated in retaking Narvik on 28 May 1940. A street in Harstad is named Gen. Fleischers Gate in his honour.

Operation Judgement took place on 4 May 1945, when the Fleet Air Arm of the Royal Navy attacked a U-boat base at Kilbotn, a village in the Harstad district, sinking two ships and a U-boat.

Harstad is also the hometown of the Norwegian army band "Forsvarets Musikkorps Nord Norge" with professional musicians.

== Transportation ==
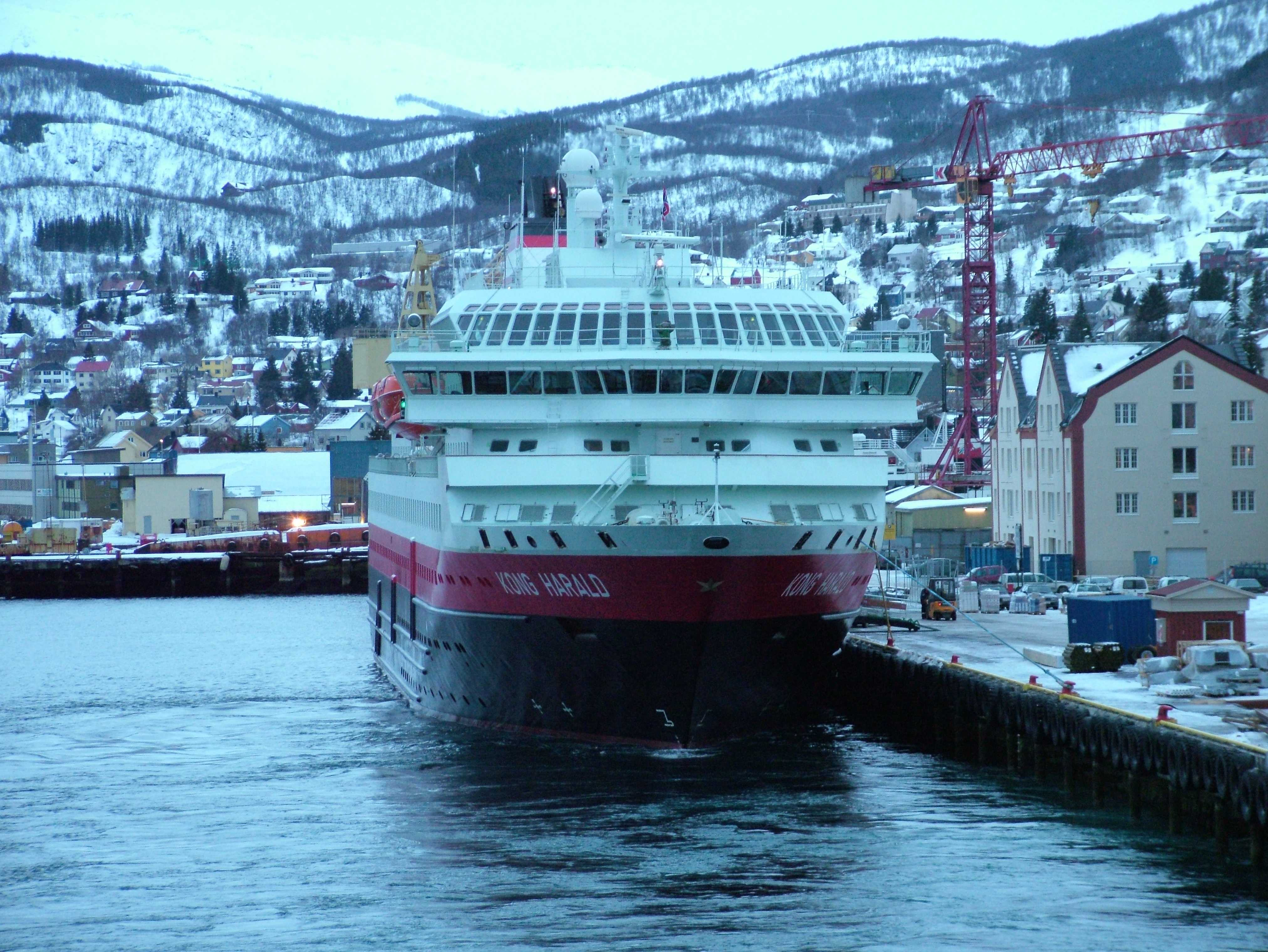
Coastal Express ship MS Kong Harald in Harstad

The local airport is Harstad/Narvik Airport, Evenes, located on the mainland in neighboring Evenes Municipality. It is 44 kilometres (27 mi) by road from the town center. The airport offers daily flights to Oslo, Trondheim, Bodø, Tromsø and Andenes.

Every morning a northbound and a southbound Hurtigruten ship stop in Harstad.

High-speed craft regularly go between Harstad and Tromsø, Finnsnes, Senja and other places.

There are several ferries and buses in the district, and in Harstad there are local buses.

The leading helicopter company in Northern Norway, Heli-Team, is located in Harstad.

== Local areas ==
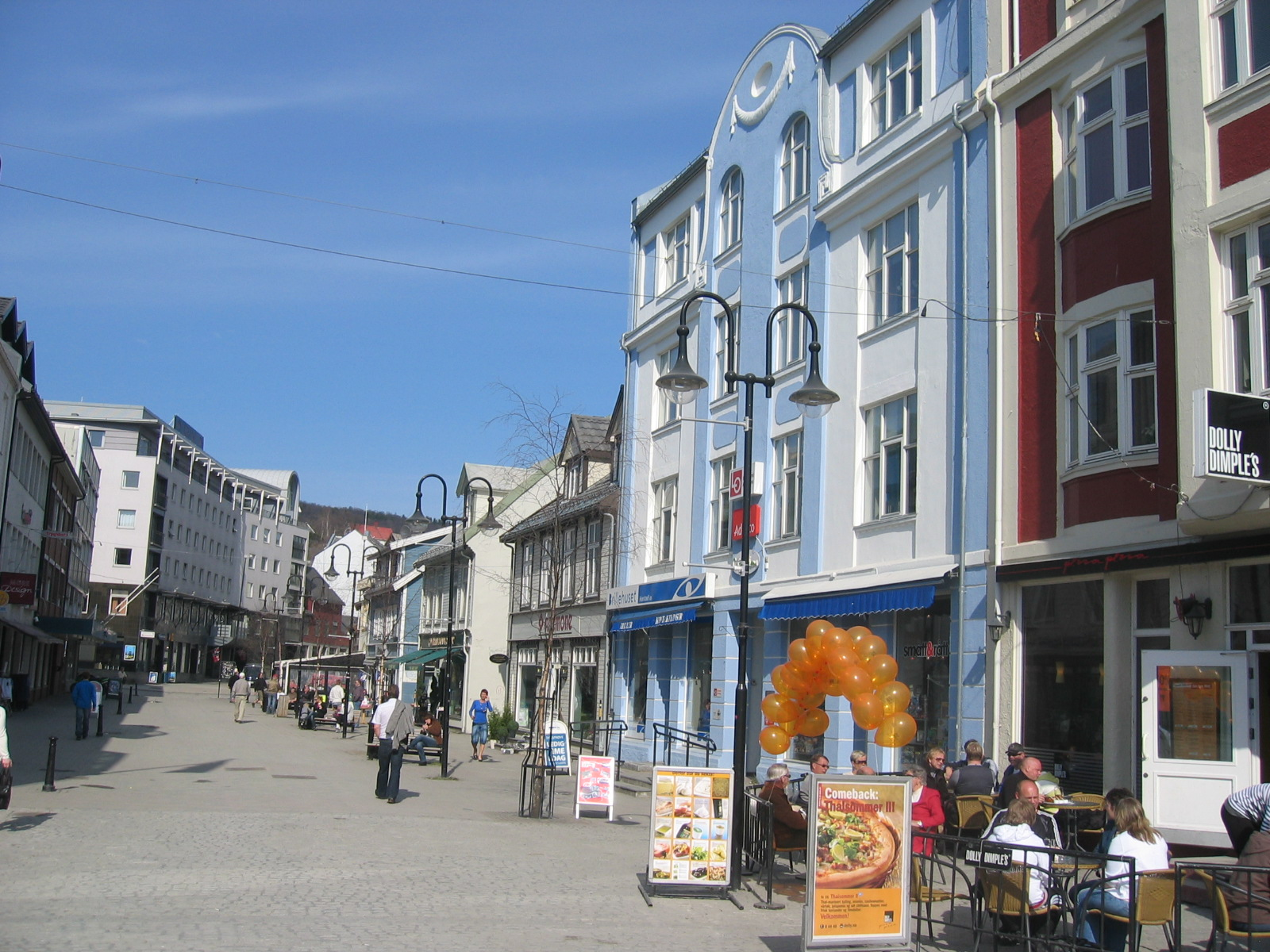
Street: Strandgata, 4 May 2008.

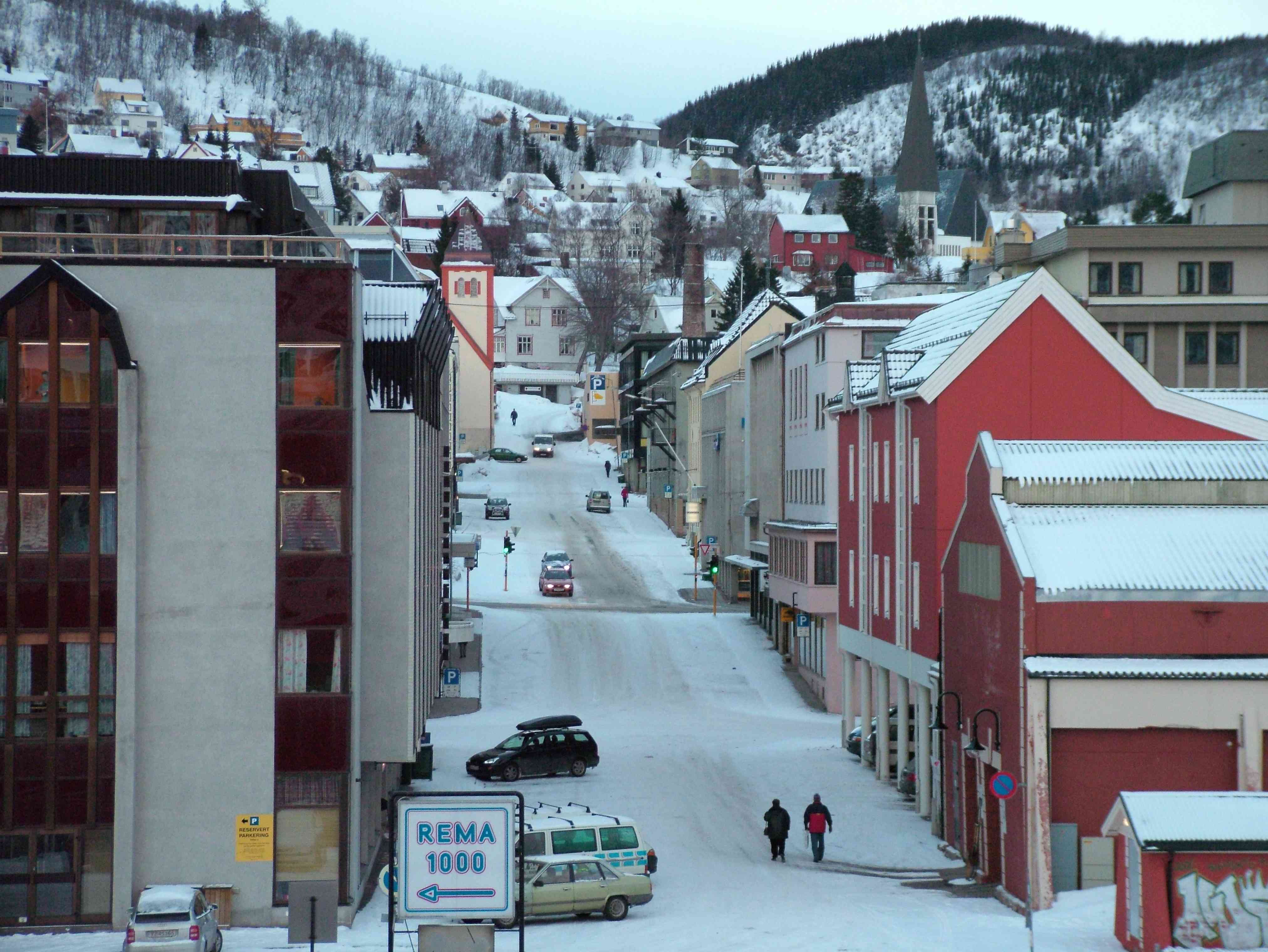
Street: Hvedings gate, February 2005. View towards west from a Hurtigruten ship.

Villages north/west of the city

Alvestad, Aune, Elgsnes, Ervik, Grøtavær, Hagan, Kasfjord, Kilhus, Kjøtta, Lundenes, Mustaparta, Nergården, Røkenes, Steinnes, Stornes, Storvassbotn, Sørlia, Tennvassåsen, Tømmeråsen, Undlandet, Vika, and Årnes.

City neighbourhoods

Bergseng, Blåbærhaugen, Breivika, City Center, Eineberget, Gangsås, Grønnebakkan, Harstadbotn, Harstadåsen, Heggen, Holtet, Kanebogen, Kilbotn, Medkila, Ruggevika, Sama, Seljestad, Skaret, Stangnes, Trondenes, and Åsby.

Villages south of the city

Brokvik, Fauskevåg, Gausvik, Halsebø, Haukebø, Melvik, Nordvik, Sandtorg, and Sørvika.

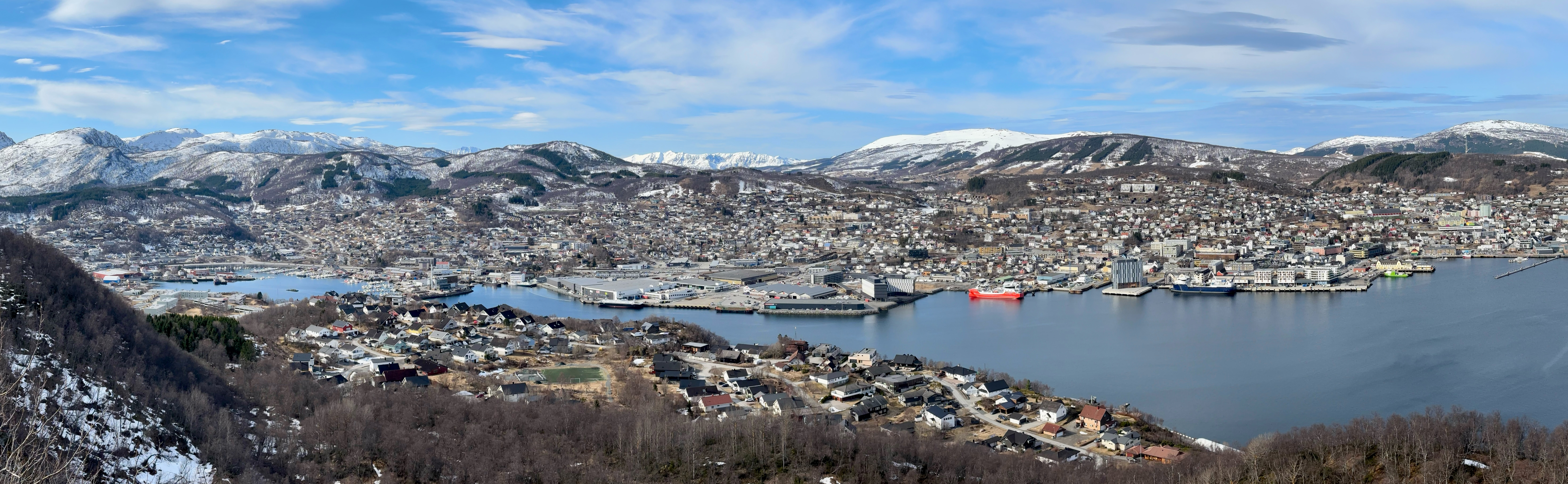
View of over Harstad from Gangsåstoppen

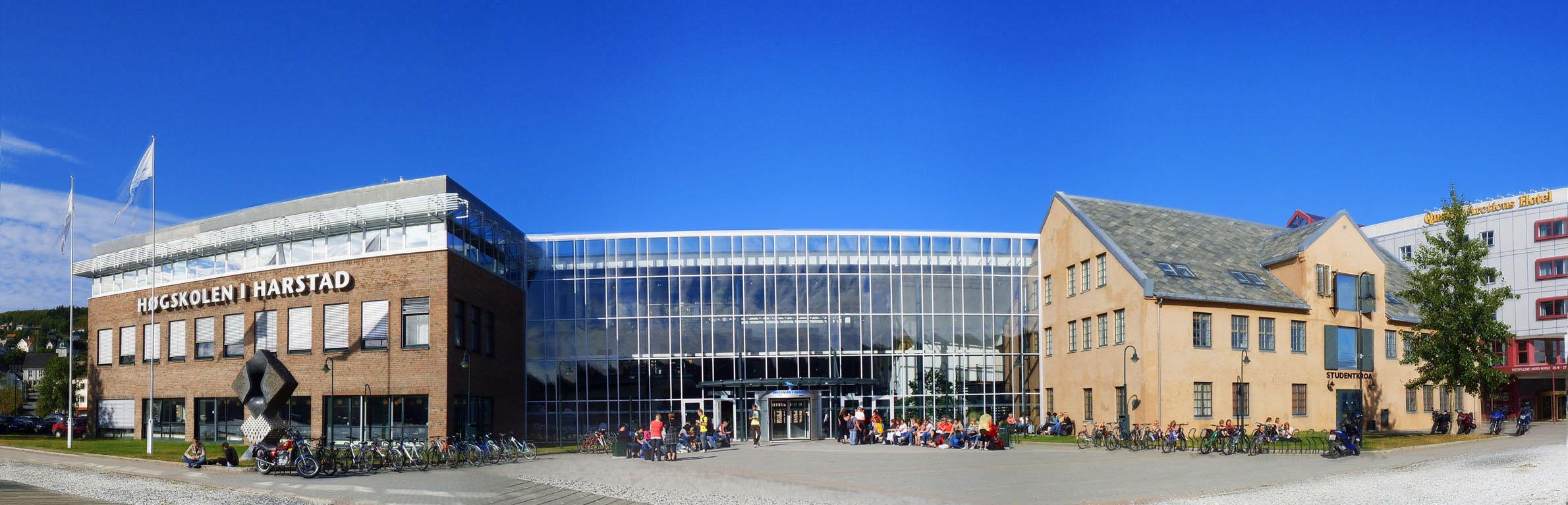
Harstad university college

== Notable people ==
=== Public Service ===
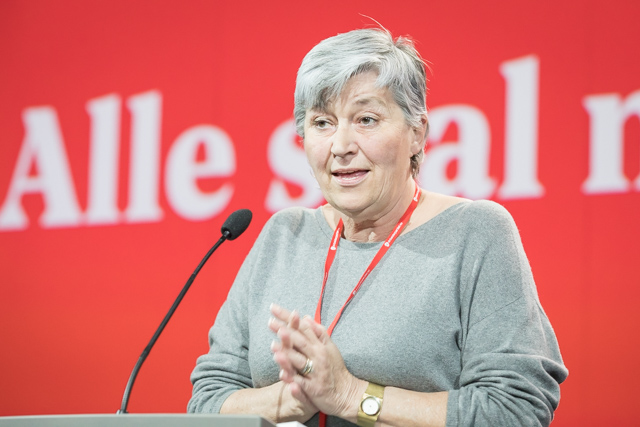
Gerd Kristiansen, 2017

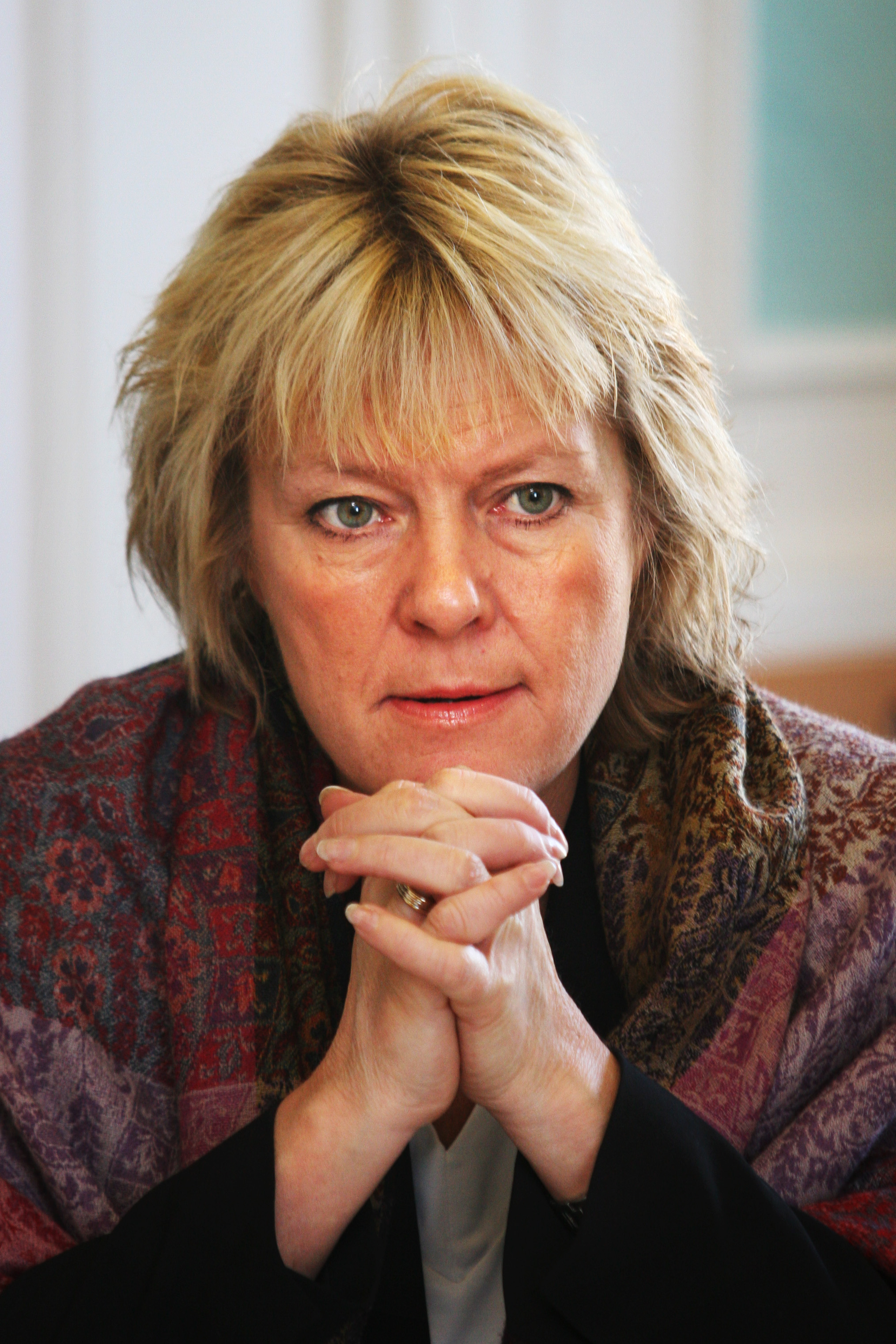
Kristin Clemet, 2005

- Andrew V. Stoltenberg (1865 in Aarnes – 1921), a US Navy recipient of the Medal of Honor
- Hans Egede (1686–1758), a Dano-Norwegian Lutheran missionary known as the Apostle of Greenland
- Anders Holte (1849 in Oldra – 1937), a sea captain and navigator
- Rikard Kaarbø (1850–1901), a businessman and politician who established the town of Harstad
- John Bernhard Rekstad (1852 in Trondenes – 1934), a geologist and amateur photographer
- Erland Frisvold (1877–1971), a Norwegian colonel, civil engineer, and Mayor of Harstad
- Paal Frisvold (1908–1997), a Norwegian general who was head of the Norwegian Army 1961 to 1966
- Sverre Holm (1910–1996), a librarian, novelist, resistance member, and sociologist
- Bjarne Berg-Sæther (1919–2009), a Norwegian politician who was Mayor of Harstad 1963 to 1967 & county mayor
- Hanna Kvanmo (1926–2005), a controversial Norwegian politician who was convicted for treason after WWII and later a member of the Norwegian Nobel Committee
- Ola Heide (born 1931 in Trondenes), a botanist
- Leif Arne Heløe (born 1932), a Norwegian politician and former Minister of Social Affairs
- Pål Spilling (1934–2018), an internet pioneer and academic
- Ola M. Steinholt (1934–2009), a bishop of the Diocese of Nord-Hålogaland
- Unni Wikan (born 1944), a professor of social anthropology
- Gerd Kristiansen (born 1955), a licensed practical nurse and leader of the Norwegian Confederation of Trade Unions from 2013 to 2017
- Kristin Clemet (born 1957), a Norwegian politician and former Minister of Education
- Elisabeth Aspaker (born 1962), a Norwegian politician and former Minister of Fisheries
- Jon Lech Johansen (born 1983), also known as DVD Jon, a computer programmer
- Silje Lundberg (born 1988), an environmentalist who grew up in Harstad

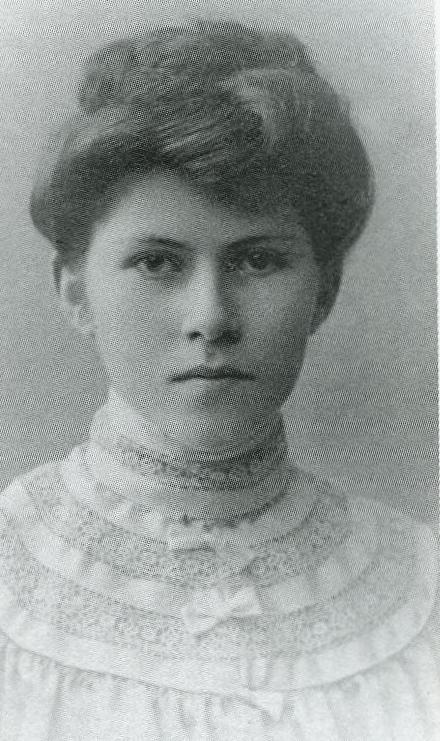
Ragnhild Kaarbo, 1910

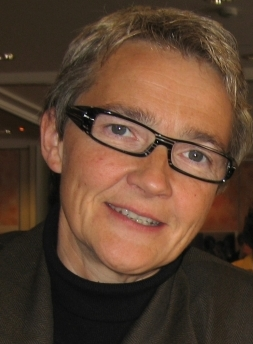
Kine Hellebust, 2008

=== The Arts ===
- Ragnhild Kaarbø (1889–1949), a painter
- Knut Andersen (1931–2019), a film director
- Reidar Thomassen (born 1936), a writer and javelin thrower
- Jan Høiland (1939–2017), a pop singer who lived in Harstad for many years
- Odd Børre (born 1939), a former pop singer who sang at the 1968 Eurovision Song Contest
- Leif Erik Forberg (born 1950) a television and radio presenter
- Kine Hellebust (born 1954), a singer, actress, children's writer, and playwright
- Ketil Stokkan (born 1956), a pop singer who sang at the 1986 and the 1990 Eurovision Song Contest
- Iren Reppen (born 1965), an actress
- Bodil Arnesen (born 1967), an operatic soprano
- Kari Innerå (born 1982), a gourmet chef
- Iselin Steiro (born 1985), a model
- Sophie Elise, (Norwegian Wiki) (born 1994), a blogger and singer
- Ruben Markussen (born 1995), a singer and songwriter who grew up in Bjarkøy
- Thea Floer Kulseng, (Norwegian Wiki) (born 2003), the winner of Melodi Grand Prix Junior 2015

=== Sport ===
- Trygve Bornø (born 1942), a retired footballer with 419 club caps and 43 for Norway
- Knut Frostad (born 1967), a yachtsman, competed in the 1988 and 1992 Summer Olympics
- Marianne Paulsen (born 1980), a Norwegian football defender
- Tom Høgli (born 1984), a former football defender with 300 club caps and 49 for Norway
- Eirik Lamøy (born 1984), a Norwegian football striker with 300 club caps

== International relations ==
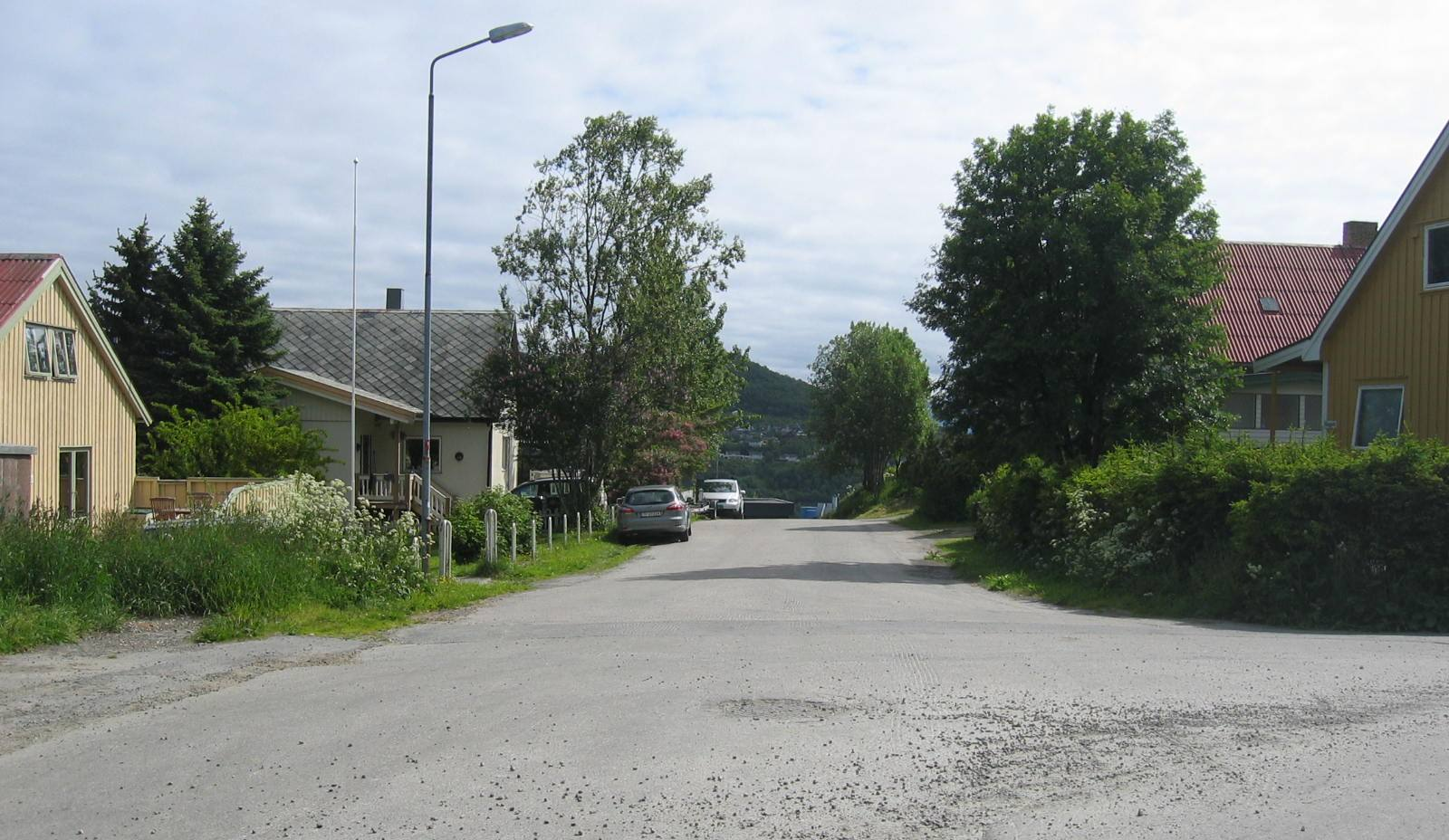
Typical residential area with private houses; Eineberget, Harstad.

=== Twin towns – Sister cities ===
The twin towns of Harstad are:

- Elsinore in Denmark
- Barnstaple in United Kingdom
- Umeå in Sweden
- Vaasa in Finland

Harstad used to be a sister city to Kirovsk, but this agreement was ended in November 2022, due to Russia's invasion of Ukraine.

== See also ==
- List of schools in Harstad
