= Elgsnes =

Village in Harstad Municipality, Norway

- Village
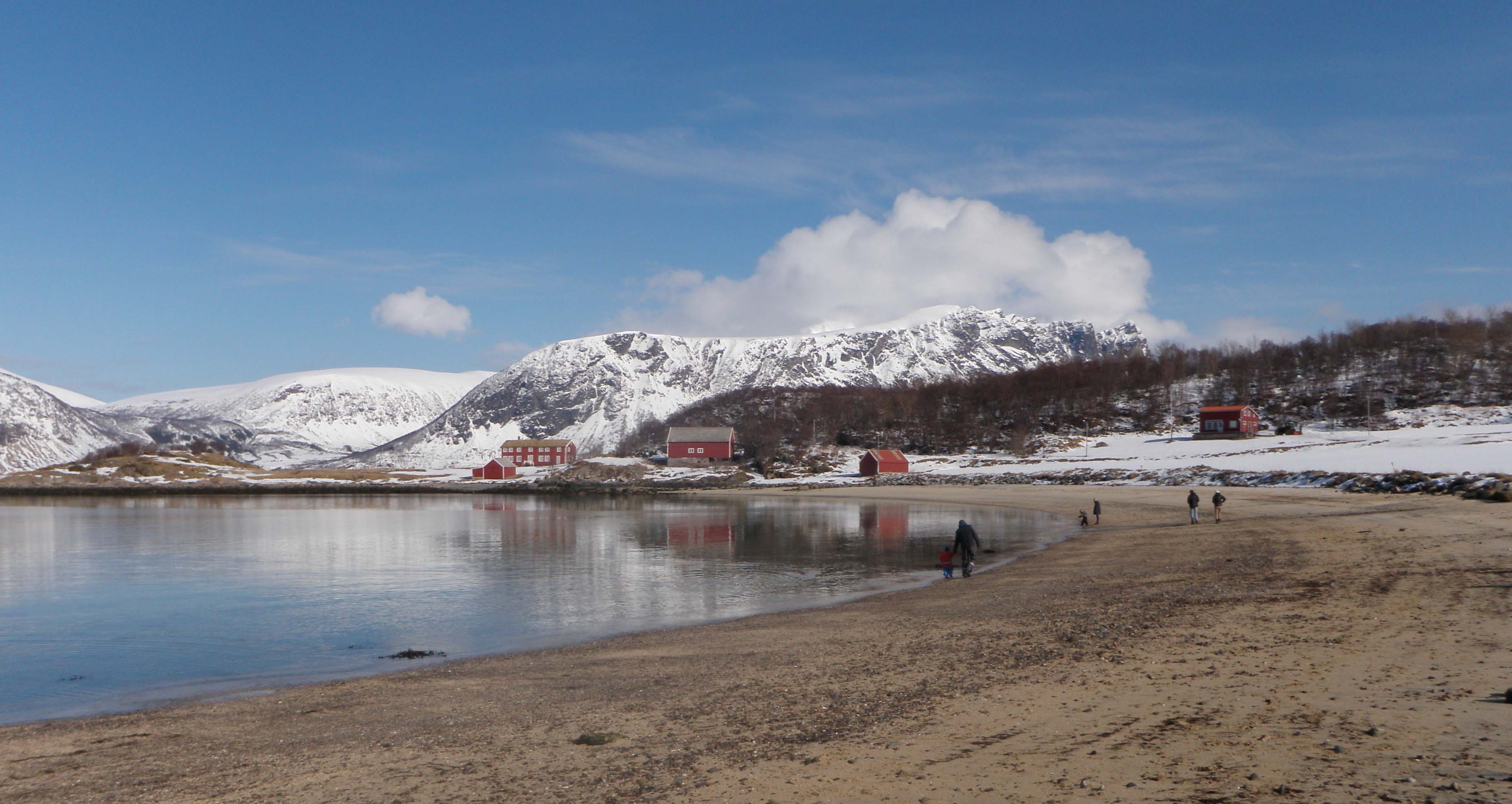
- Seaside view of the village
- Interactive map of Elgsnes
- Location within Troms Location within Norway
- Coordinates: 68°54′59″N 16°15′45″E
- Country: Norway
- Region: Northern Norway
- County: Troms
- District: Central Hålogaland
- Municipality: Harstad Municipality
- Elevation: 18 m (59 ft)
- Time zone: UTC+01:00 (CET)
  - Summer (DST): UTC+02:00 (CEST)
- Post Code: 9402 Harstad

Elgsnes is a village in Harstad Municipality in Troms county, Norway. It is located on the northeastern part of the large island of Hinnøya, along the Andfjorden, about 24 kilometres (15 mi) northwest of the town of Harstad and about 16 kilometres (9.9 mi) north of the village of Kasfjord. Elgsnes is located at the tip of a narrow peninsula, looking across the Toppsundet strait towards the village of Grøtavær on the island of Grytøya. Elgsnes Chapel is located in this village.

== History ==
Elgsnes has been inhabited from the early Stone Age, at least 10,000 years ago. Many finds have been made in and around the village. Some of the finds come from the Neolithic period (5000 – 2000 B.C.), but from the Bronze Age (2000 – 0 B.C.) there is little left from the two big cairns. A woman's grave from the Merovingian period (600 – 800 A.D.) was richly equipped, including jewelry from the Baltic region and Karelia. A blacksmith's grave from the Viking Age (800 - 1.050 A.D.) was, when it was opened in the 1950s, considered to be the fourth richest of its kind in Scandinavia. The trade station down at Raten has a history dating back to 1675. At its peak there were 23 houses at the promontory, including the main building from 1723. In 1798, the trade station got a royal license as a guesthouse, so the use of the building for overnight guests started more than 200 years ago. As Harstad developed as a trade center, the trade in Elgsnes declined, and in 1914 it came to an end. The houses were sold off, so today only the main building is left from the old trade station houses.
