= Gausvik Church =

- Gausvik kirke
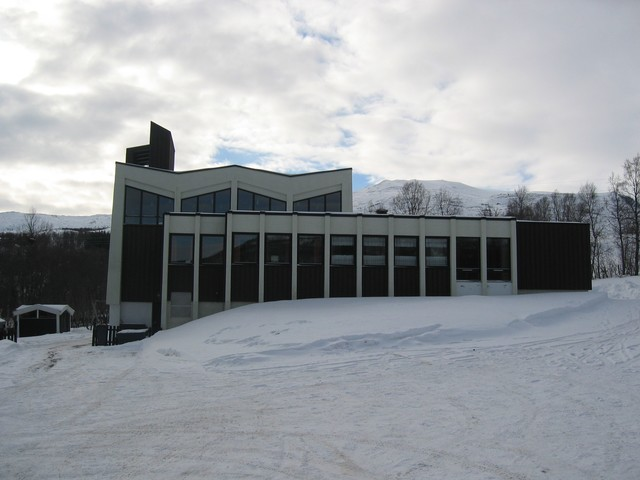
- View of the church
- Gausvik Church
- 68.6111572°N 16.4922836°E
- Location: Harstad Municipality, Troms
- Country: Norway
- Denomination: Church of Norway
- Churchmanship: Evangelical Lutheran

History
- Status: Parish church
- Founded: 1979
- Consecrated: 1979

Architecture
- Functional status: Active
- Architect: Nils Toft
- Architectural type: Rectangular
- Completed: 1979 (47 years ago)

Specifications
- Capacity: 160
- Materials: Concrete and wood

Administration
- Diocese: Nord-Hålogaland
- Deanery: Trondenes prosti
- Parish: Sandtorg

Gausvik Church (Norwegian: Gausvik kirke) is a parish church of the Church of Norway in Harstad Municipality in Troms county, Norway. It is located in the village of Gausvik on the east side of the island of Hinnøya. It is one of the churches in the Sandtorg parish which is part of the Trondenes prosti (deanery) in the Diocese of Nord-Hålogaland. The concrete and wood church was built in a rectangular style in 1979 using plans drawn up by the architect Nils Toft. The church seats about 160 people.

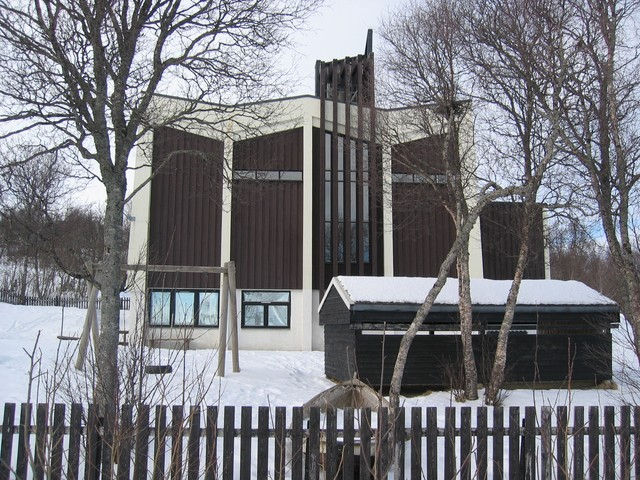
View of the church

== See also ==
- List of churches in Nord-Hålogaland
