= Trondenes Fort =

Fort in Harstad, Troms, Norway

- Harstad, Norway
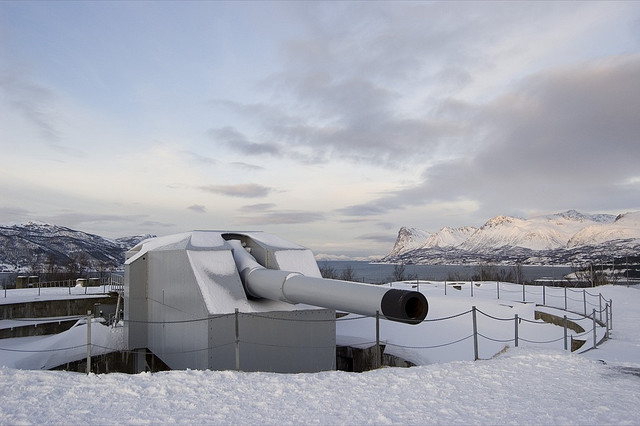
- Adolf Gun at Trondenes

Site information
- Type: Military base
- Owner: Norwegian Armed Forces

Location
- Coordinates: 68.8277°N 16.5656°E

Site history
- Built: 1943
- Built by: Nazi German Army

Garrison information
- Garrison: Norwegian Coastal Ranger Command

Trondenes Fort is a fort situated on the Trondenes peninsula in Harstad Municipality in Troms county, Norway. It is located about 2.5 kilometres (1.6 mi) north of the town of Harstad. The fort has been the main base for the Norwegian Coastal Ranger Command since 2002. The fort was built in 1943 by the Nazis occupying Norway during World War II as a part of the Atlantic Wall.

== Equipment ==
The fort was equipped with four of the world's largest land-based guns (40.6 centimetres or 16.0 inches). The guns were taken out of the Norwegian mobilisation plans in 1961, but are still in place and one is kept in working order for conservation purposes. The guns are 40.6 cm Schnelladekanone C/34, sometimes known as Adolfkanone or Adolf Guns, and have a barrel length of 20.3 metres (67 ft). The standard shell weighed 1,030 kilograms (2,270 lb) with a range of about 43,000 metres (27 mi), while the lighter 600 kilograms (1,300 lb) shell had a range of about 56,000 metres (35 mi). As a part of the Atlantic Wall, the fort is unique in its original set up and high degree of preservation.
