= Trondenes Historical Center =

Museum in Harstad, Troms, Norway

Coordinates: 68°49′13″N 16°33′27″E

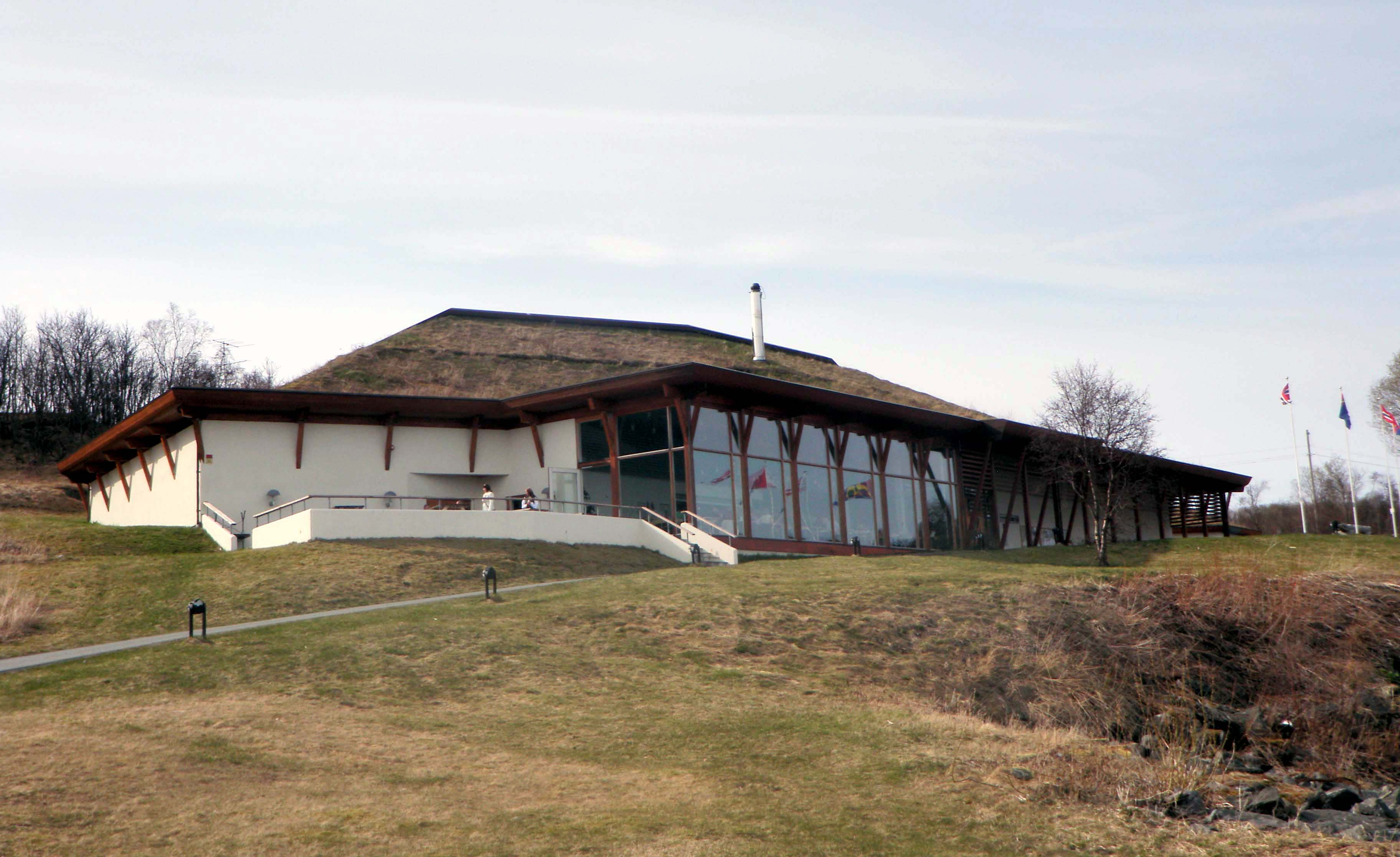
Trondenes Historical Center 17 May 2012

Trondenes Historical Center (Norwegian: Trondenes Historiske Senter) is a museum located in Trondenes, in the town of Harstad, in Troms county, Norway.

The museum covers the history of Trondenes and the surrounding areas. The museum displaying more than 2,000 years of history in the region, which was once a Viking Age power centre. Local chieftains included Thorir Hund, who killed Norway's Patron Saint, Saint Olav during the Battle of Stiklestad in 1030. The Trondenes Historical Centre tells the history of the area from the early Viking settlement to the 1940-1945 Nazi German occupation, with paintings, artifacts and statues depicting their history.

The museum is situated near the historic, stone Trondenes Church. The exhibition is permanent, the main focus being on the Medieval age period. The museum building contains a cafeteria and conference rooms, amounting to 1,860 m^{2} in total. Trondenes Historical Center was inaugurated in May 1997 and is now a division of Sør-Troms Museum.
