= Lundenes Church =

- Lundenes kirke
- Lundenes Church
- 68.875513°N 16.566024°E
- Location: Harstad Municipality, Troms
- Country: Norway
- Denomination: Church of Norway
- Churchmanship: Evangelical Lutheran

History
- Status: Parish church
- Founded: 1974
- Consecrated: 1974

Architecture
- Functional status: Active
- Architect: Osvald Flakstad
- Architectural type: Long church
- Completed: 1974 (52 years ago)

Specifications
- Capacity: 200
- Materials: Wood

Administration
- Diocese: Nord-Hålogaland
- Deanery: Trondenes prosti
- Parish: Vågsfjord
- Norwegian Cultural Heritage Site
- Type: Church
- Status: Not protected
- ID: 84338

Lundenes Church (Norwegian: Lundenes kirke) is a parish church of the Church of Norway in Harstad Municipality in Troms county, Norway. It is located in the village of Lundenes on the island of Grytøya. It is one of the churches for the Vågsfjord parish which is part of the Trondenes prosti (deanery) in the Diocese of Nord-Hålogaland. The red, wooden church was built in a long church style in 1974 using plans drawn up by the architect Osvald Flakstad. The church seats about 200 people.

== See also ==
- List of churches in Nord-Hålogaland
