= Gausvika =

Village in Harstad Municipality, Norway

Gausvika Gausvik
- Village
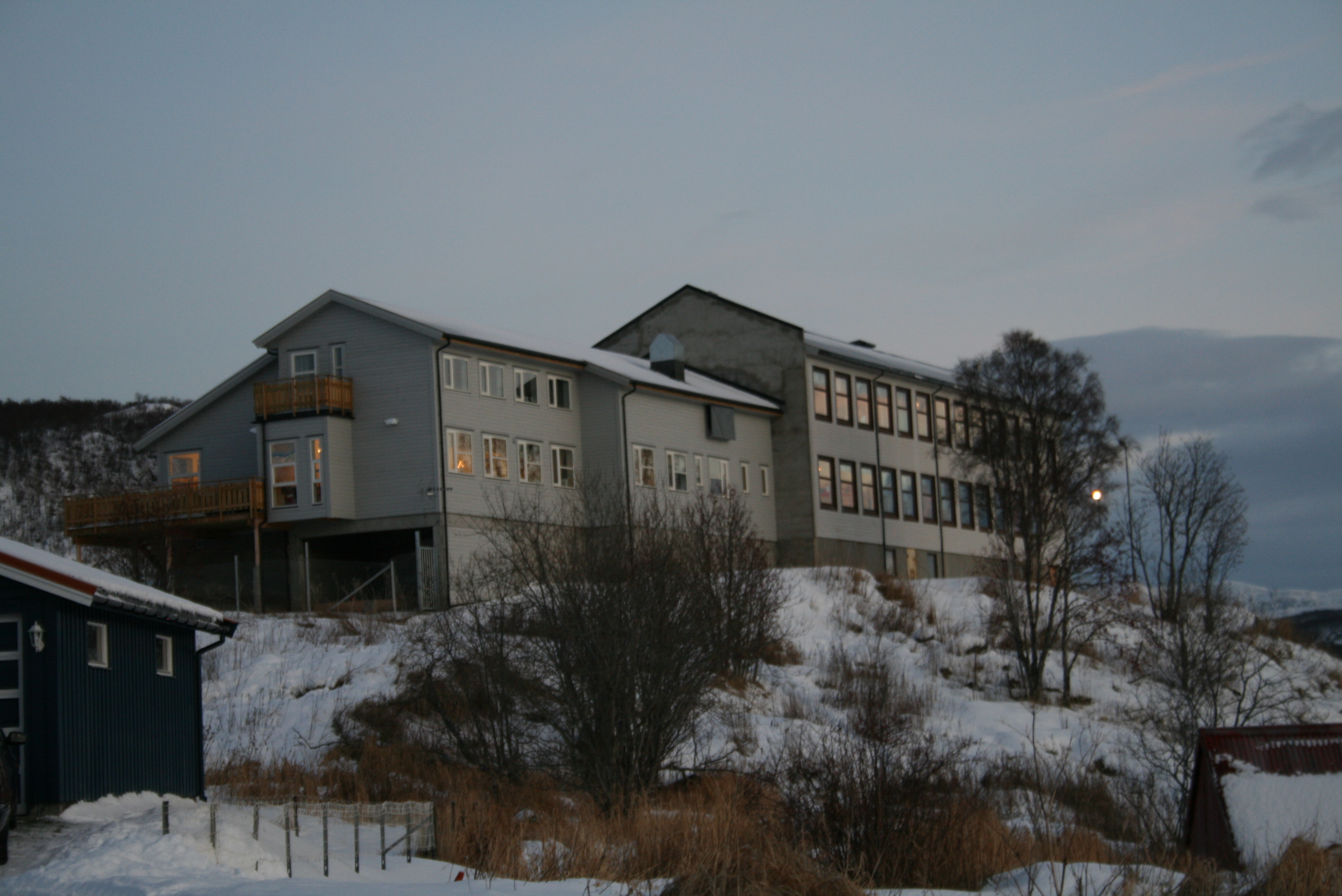
- View of the local school
- Interactive map of Gausvika
- Location within Troms Location within Norway
- Coordinates: 68°36′47″N 16°30′46″E
- Country: Norway
- Region: Northern Norway
- County: Troms
- District: Central Hålogaland
- Municipality: Harstad Municipality
- Elevation: 16 m (52 ft)
- Time zone: UTC+01:00 (CET)
  - Summer (DST): UTC+02:00 (CEST)
- Post Code: 9430 Sandtorg

Gausvika or Gausvik is a village in Harstad Municipality in Troms county, Norway. It is in the northeastern part of the large island of Hinnøya, along the Tjeldsundet Strait, about 25 kilometres (16 mi) south of the town of Harstad. The European route E10 highway passes through the village, about 3 kilometres (1.9 mi) south of the Tjeldsund Bridge. Gausvik Church is in the village.
