= Fauskevåg =

Village in Harstad Municipality, Norway

- Village
- Interactive map of Fauskevåg
- Location within Troms Location within Norway
- Coordinates: 68°39′56″N 16°34′30″E
- Country: Norway
- Region: Northern Norway
- County: Troms
- District: Central Hålogaland
- Municipality: Harstad Municipality
- Elevation: 26 m (85 ft)
- Time zone: UTC+01:00 (CET)
  - Summer (DST): UTC+02:00 (CEST)
- Post Code: 9419 Sørvik

Fauskevåg is a village in Harstad Municipality in Troms county, Norway. It is located on the island of Hinnøya, along the Vågsfjorden, about 20 km (12 mi) south of the town of Harstad. The population (2001) of Fauskevåg is 341. The village has an elementary school called Fauskevåg skole with grades 1 through 4.

Fauskevåg is located near the island of Grasholmen, a popular beach and recreation area, so tourism is important in Fauskevåg during the months of June and July. The village is located about 5 km (3.1 mi) north of European route E10 and the Tjeldsund Bridge. The village is located nearby the villages of Sørvika, Sandtorg, and Kilbotn.
