= Grøtavær Church =

- Grøtavær kirke
- Grøtavær Church
- 68.9591911°N 16.2659776°E
- Location: Harstad Municipality, Troms
- Country: Norway
- Denomination: Church of Norway
- Churchmanship: Evangelical Lutheran

History
- Former name: Grøtavær kapell
- Status: Parish church
- Founded: 1915
- Consecrated: 1915

Architecture
- Functional status: Active
- Architectural type: Long church
- Completed: 1915 (111 years ago)

Specifications
- Capacity: 200
- Materials: Wood

Administration
- Diocese: Nord-Hålogaland
- Deanery: Trondenes prosti
- Parish: Vågsfjord
- Norwegian Cultural Heritage Site
- Type: Church
- Status: Not protected
- ID: 84443

Grøtavær Church (Norwegian: Grøtavær kirke) is a parish church of the Church of Norway in Harstad Municipality in Troms county, Norway. It is located in the village of Grøtavær on the island of Grytøya. It is one of the churches for the Vågsfjord parish which is part of the Trondenes prosti (deanery) in the Diocese of Nord-Hålogaland. The white, wooden church was built in a long church style in 1915 using plans drawn up by an unknown architect. The church seats about 200 people.

== See also ==
- List of churches in Nord-Hålogaland
