= Grøtavær =

Village in Harstad Municipality, Norway

- Village
- Interactive map of Grøtavær
- Location within Troms Location within Norway
- Coordinates: 68°57′51″N 16°15′43″E
- Country: Norway
- Region: Northern Norway
- County: Troms
- District: Central Hålogaland
- Municipality: Harstad Municipality
- Elevation: 34 m (112 ft)
- Time zone: UTC+01:00 (CET)
  - Summer (DST): UTC+02:00 (CEST)
- Post Code: 9423 Grøtavær

Grøtavær is a coastal fishing village in Harstad Municipality in Troms county, Norway. It is located on the western part of the island of Grytøya, along the Andfjorden, about 16 kilometres (9.9 mi) northwest of the village of Lundenes. Grøtavær Church is located in the village and the Grøtavær islands are located just off shore.
