= Stangnes =

Neighborhood in the town of Harstad, Norway

Stangnes: Stangnes (Norwegian); Stággogeahči (Northern Sami)
- Neighborhood in Harstad
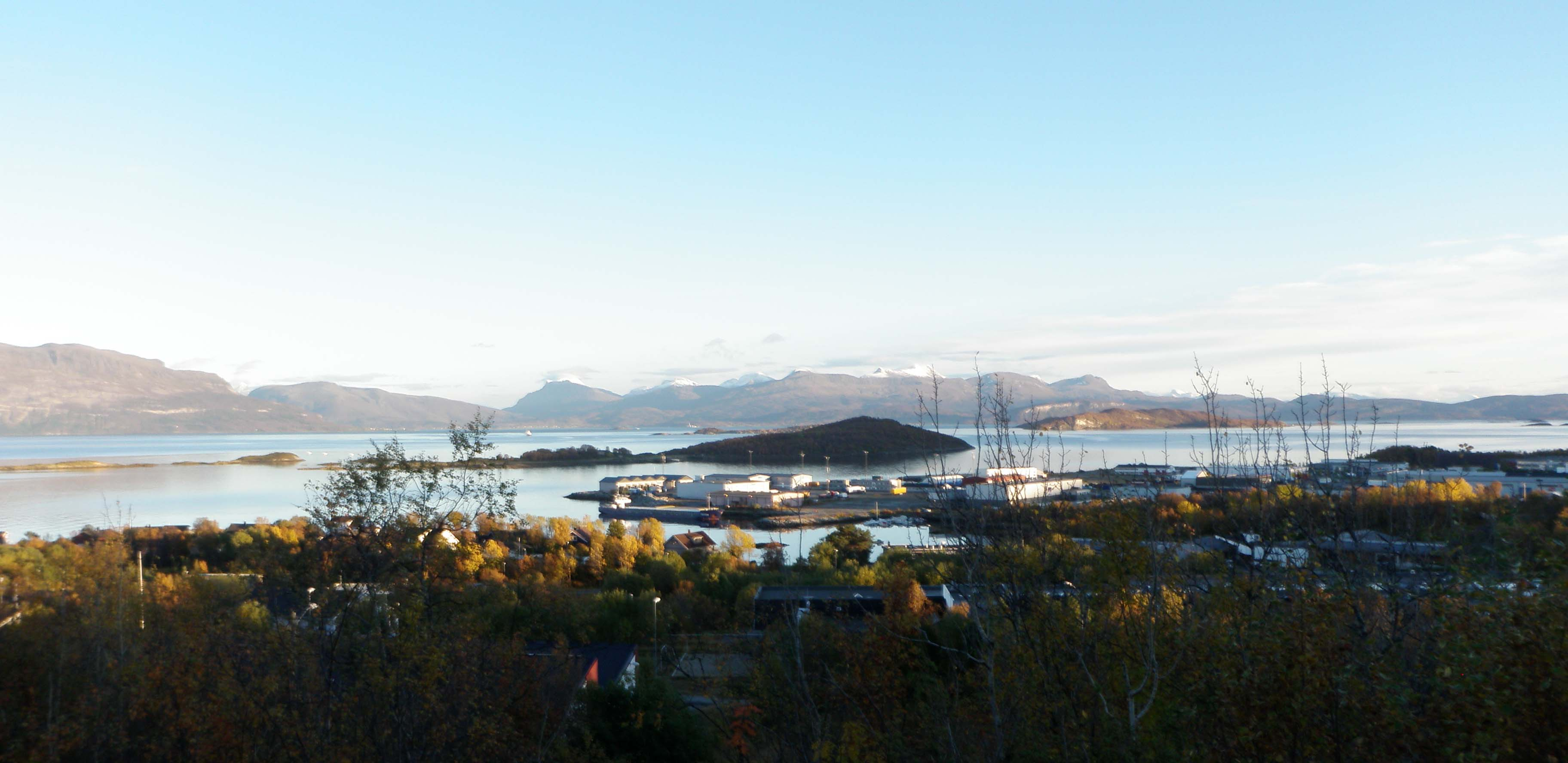
- View of the south-eastern part of the area
- Interactive map of Stangnes
- Location within Troms Location within Norway
- Coordinates: 68°47′22″N 16°35′57″E
- Country: Norway
- Region: Northern Norway
- County: Troms
- District: Central Hålogaland
- Municipality: Harstad Municipality
- Elevation: 1 m (3.3 ft)
- Time zone: UTC+01:00 (CET)
  - Summer (DST): UTC+02:00 (CEST)

Stangnes (Norwegian) or Stággogeahči (Northern Sami) is a neighborhood within the town of Harstad which is located in Harstad Municipality in Troms county, Norway. It is located on a small peninsula southeast of the city center, on the south and east sides of the Gansåsen hill. The neighborhood is bordered by the neighborhoods of Gansås and Åsby to the west, Kanebogen to the southwest, and the Vågsfjorden to the north and east. Many people live in the area, where the Stangneslia barnehage (kindergarten), Stangnes barneskole (primary school), and Stangnes videregående skole (high school) are all located.

The southeastern part of Stangnes is a large industrial area called Stangnesbasen. This area was built in the 1980s to provide for those involved in the oil industry in the Barents Sea. The Stangnesodden headland to the northeast contains a former military base.
