= Grasholmen, Troms =

Island in Harstad Municipality in Troms county, Norway

Grasholmen (Norwegian); Rássesuolu (Northern Sami)
- Interactive map of: Grasholmen (Norwegian); Rássesuolu (Northern Sami)

Geography
- Location: Troms, Norway
- Coordinates: 68.67288°N 16.62617°E

Administration
- Norway
- County: Troms
- Municipality: Harstad Municipality

Grasholmen (Norwegian) or Rássesuolu (Northern Sami) is an island in Harstad Municipality in Troms county, Norway. It is part of a small archipelago of several islets just outside the town of Harstad along the Vågsfjorden, at the northern end of the Tjeldsundet strait. The village of Fauskevåg lies on the large island of Hinnøya, just west of Grasholmen. The islets are popular recreational areas, especially in the summer.
