= Gansås =

Neighborhood in the town of Harstad, Norway

Gansås Gangsås
- Neighborhood in Harstad
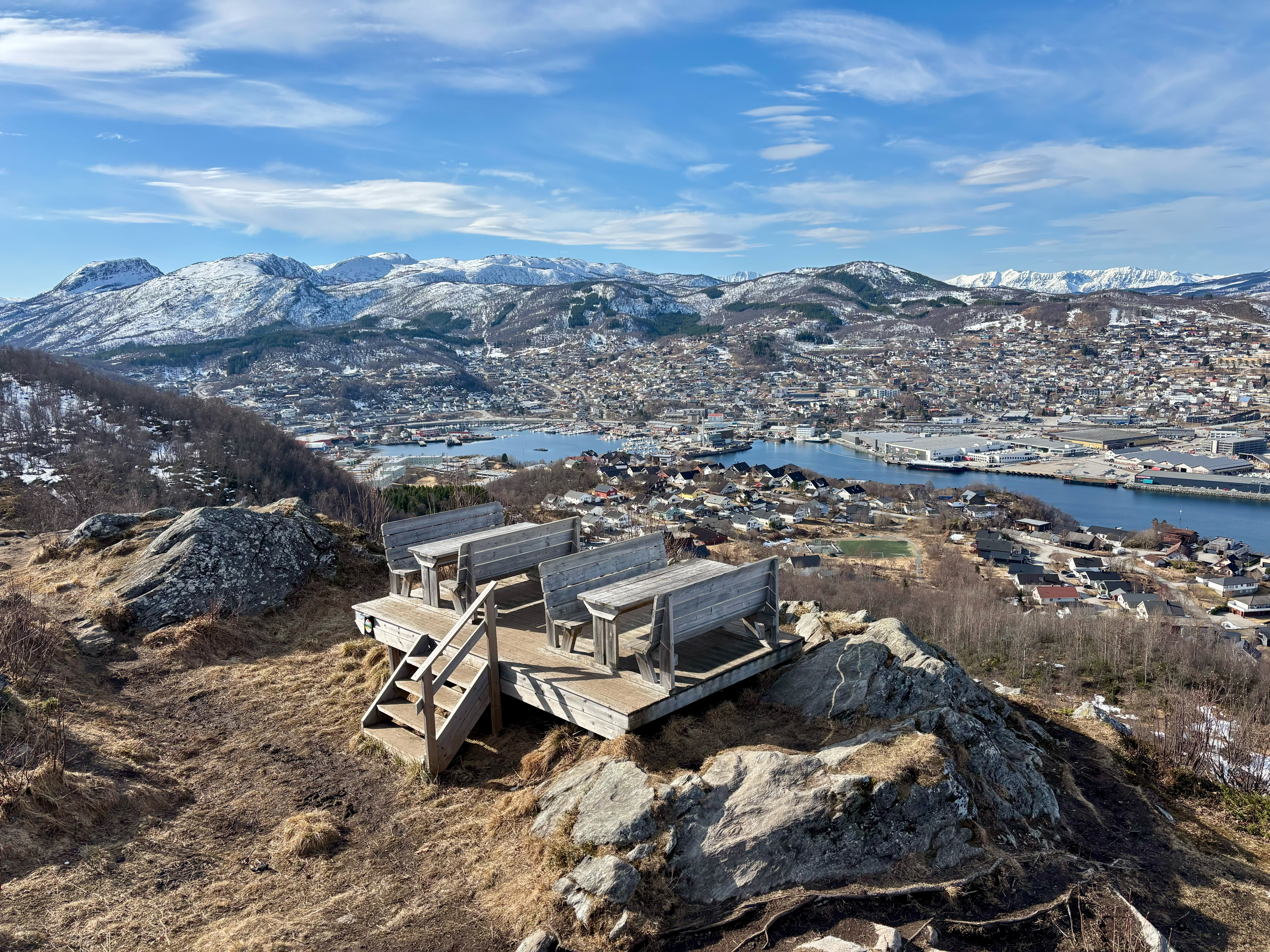
- View from Gangsåstoppen, the highest point of the peninsula. The town center in located on the other side of Vågsfjorden.
- Interactive map of Gansås
- Location within Troms Location within Norway
- Coordinates: 68°47′10″N 16°34′09″E
- Country: Norway
- Region: Northern Norway
- County: Troms
- District: Central Hålogaland
- Municipality: Harstad Municipality
- Elevation: 52 m (171 ft)
- Time zone: UTC+01:00 (CET)
  - Summer (DST): UTC+02:00 (CEST)

Gansås is a neighborhood within the town of Harstad which is located in Harstad Municipality in Troms county, Norway. It is situated on the southern and western sides of a small peninsula southeast of the city center. The main residential areas in Gansås are Vollen (inhabited since 1975) and Øvre Gangsås (Upper Gangsås) (established in the 1980s).

Gangsås is bounded by Stangnes to the east, Åsby and Kanebogen to the south, and Vågsfjorden to the northwest.

== Gangsåstoppen ==
The ending ås in Gangsås means hill, and the top of the hill is called Gangsåstoppen. It is uninhabited, has an elevation of approximately 180 metres (590 ft) above sea level, and has one of the best views of the city (to the west) and the surrounding areas, including the hills Middagsfjellet and Hinnstein. To the east one sees the island of Rolla and the mainland, to the south is the Tjeldsundet strait, and to the north are the islands of Grytøya and Senja.

A marked path leads to Gangsåstoppen from the car park at the end of the Toppenveien road. The trip takes about 20 minutes, and there is a mail box at the top where one may sign the guest book.

== Industry ==
At the western foot of the hill is Mercur; some people live there, but the area is mostly industrialized, not least by Statoil.

== Media gallery ==
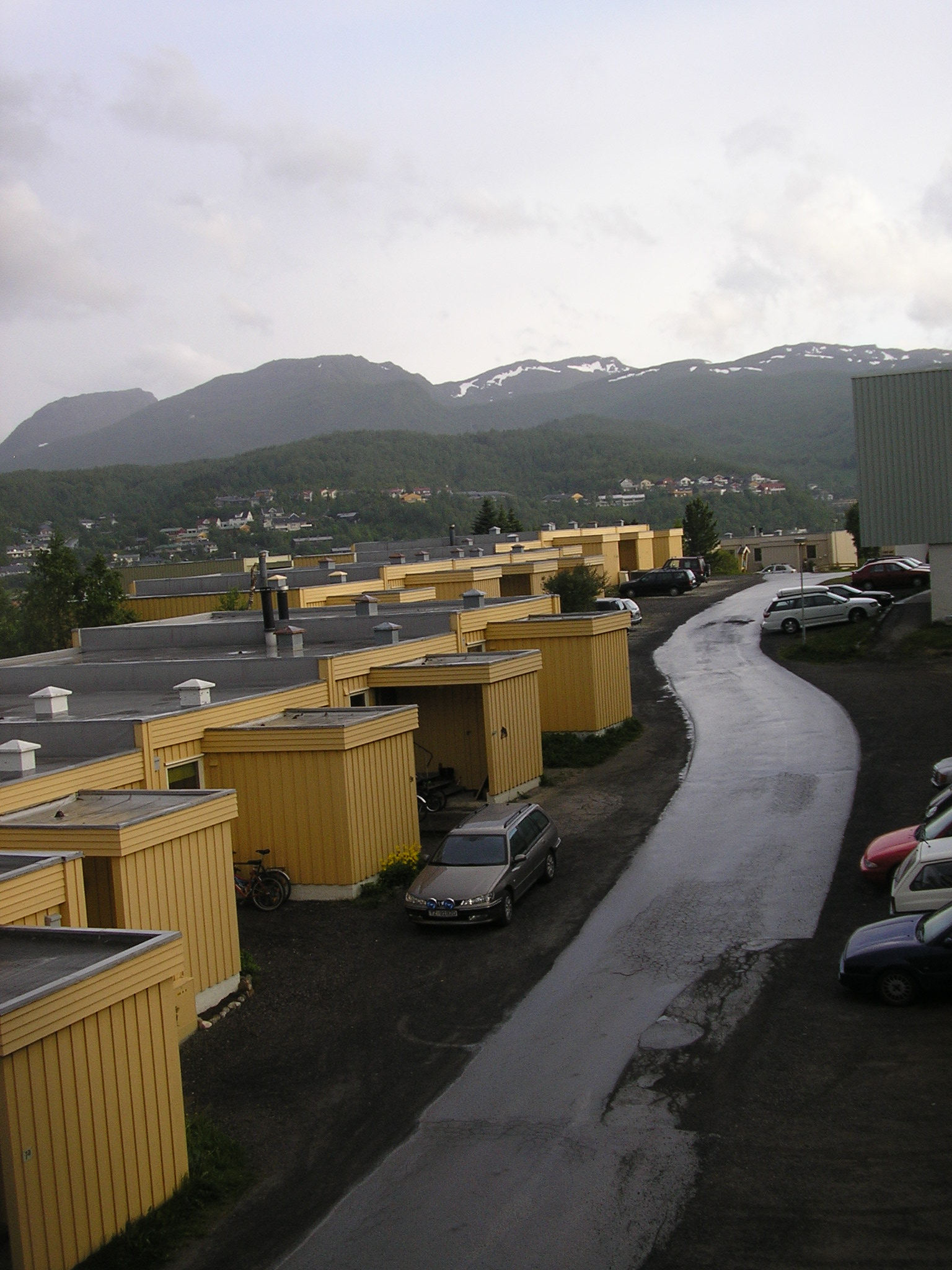
Part of Vollen on a rainy day.

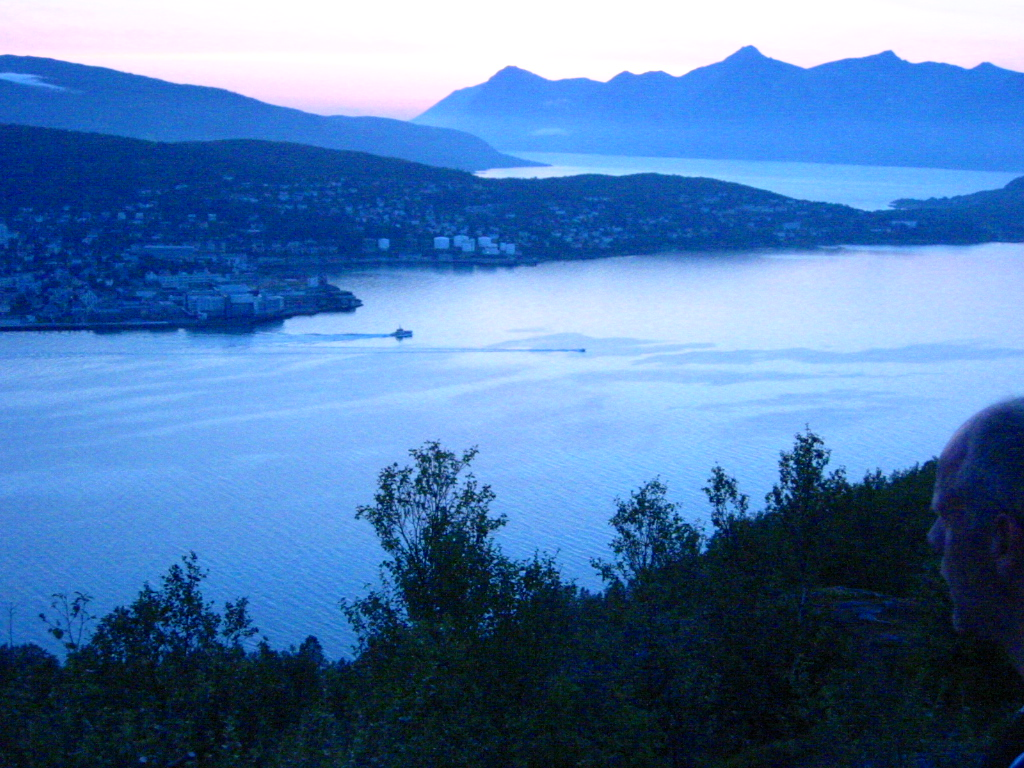
The northern part of Harstad at night (looking northwest from Gangsåstoppen).
