= Sverre Holm (sociologist) =

Norwegian librarian, novelist, sociologist

- Born: 14 May 1910; Harstad, Norway
- Died: 23 August 1996 (aged 86)
- Occupations: Librarian, novelist and sociologist
- Employer: University of Oslo

Sverre Holm (14 May 1910 – 23 August 1996) was a Norwegian librarian, novelist, resistance member and sociologist. He was born in Harstad.

Holm published the novel Stor konsert in 1938. In 1940 he helped evacuate the Norwegian gold reserves after the German attack on Norway. He later joined the resistance movement, and was incarcerated in Møllergata 19 in Oslo from December 1944 to May 1945. He was appointed professor at the University of Oslo from 1949, the first professor of Sociology in Norway, and held this position until his retirement in 1980.
