= Halvar Hansen =

Norwegian politician (born 1947)

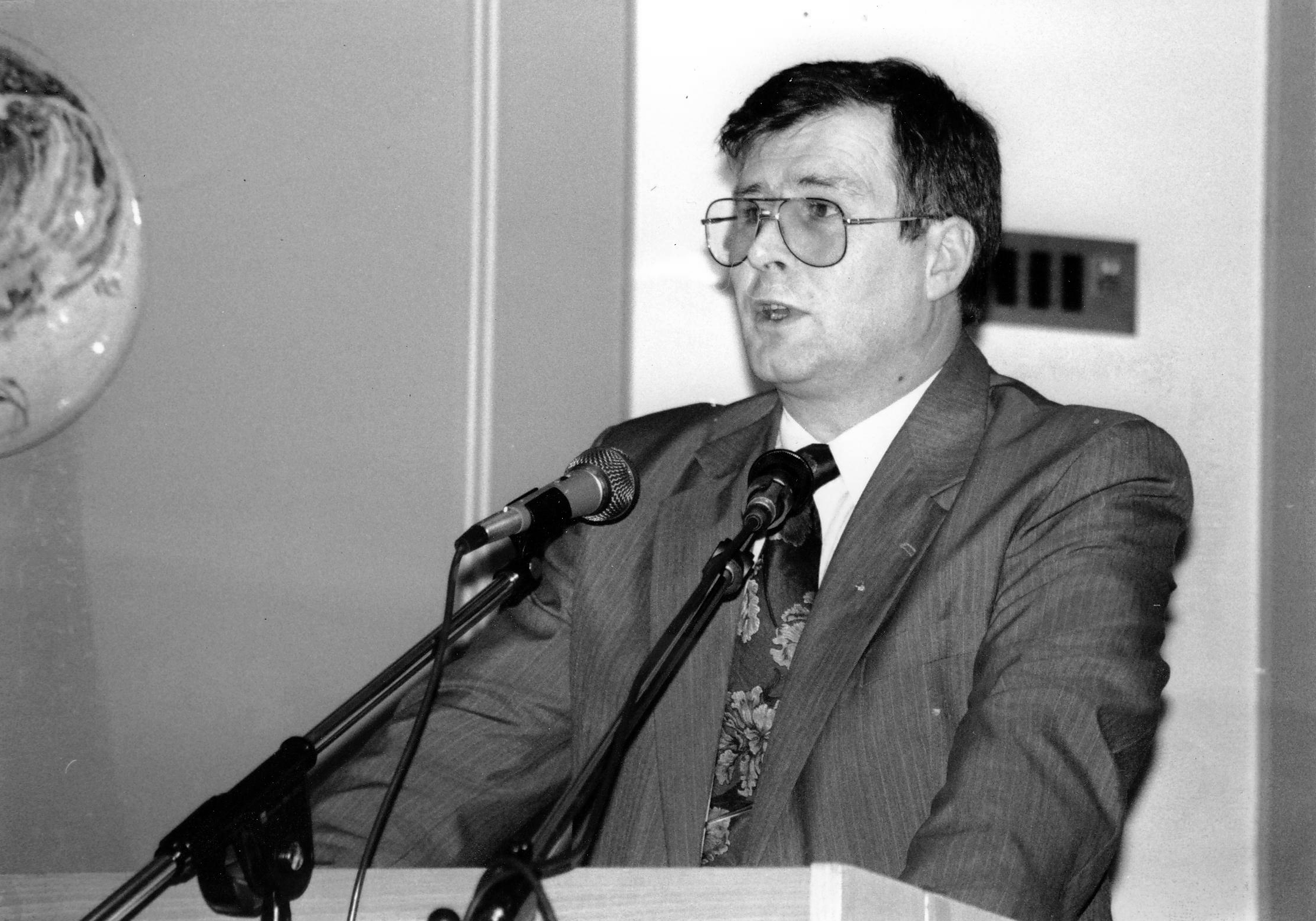
Halvar Hansen in 1993

Halvar Hansen (born 4 August 1947) is a Norwegian politician for the Labour Party.

He served as a deputy representative to the Norwegian Parliament from Troms during the term 1981–1985.

On the local level Hansen was the mayor of Harstad municipality from 2003 to 2007.
