= John Bernhard Rekstad =

Norwegian geologist

John Bernhard Rekstad (October 2, 1852 – April 1, 1934) was a Norwegian geologist.

== Biography ==
Rekstad was born in Trondenes in Troms county, Norway. He took his teaching exams in 1887 and then taught at high schools in Røros, Namsos, and Lillehammer. From 1896 to 1900 he was an adjunct instructor at Bergen Cathedral School. In 1900 he became the first geologist at the Norwegian Geological Survey in Kristiania (now Oslo). He specialized in glaciology (in 1890 and 1891 he examined the complete extent of the Svartisen glaciers) and Norway's glacial deposits. He created geological maps for the Norwegian Geological Survey, especially for Western Norway, Jotunheimen, and Nordland, and he published a number of geological articles. He died on April 1, 1934. He was a fellow of the Norwegian Academy of Science and Letters.

== Photography ==
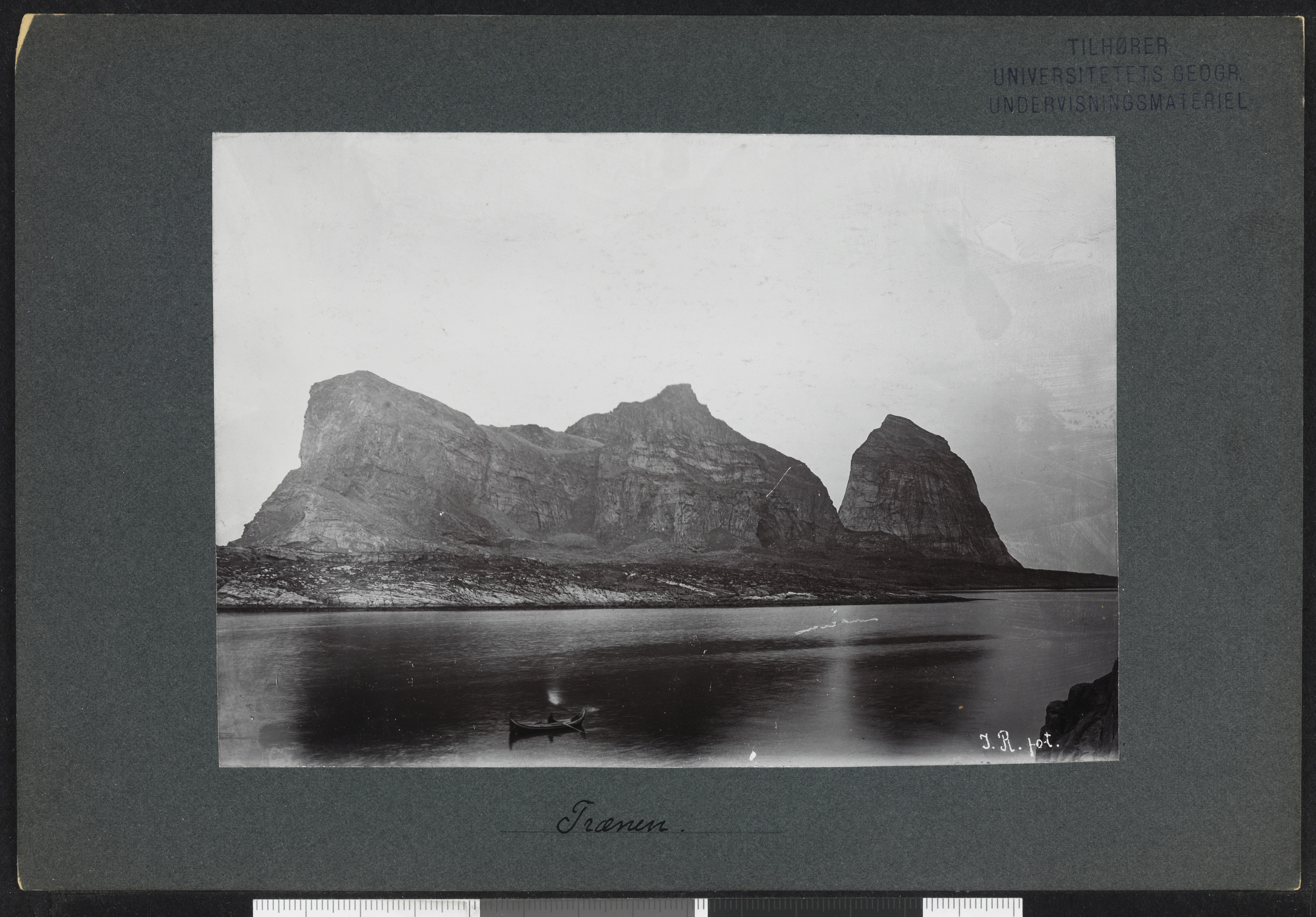
Photo of Sanna by Rekstad (unknown date).

Rekstad was also an avid amateur photographer. His geological research trips took him across Norway and his camera was always with him on his expeditions. He primarily photographed geological formations, mountains, glaciers, and rock samples. However, he also took many striking photos of the settlements and people around him. His collection of negatives consists of 2,640 glass plates and sheet films. His photos are kept in the Rekstad Collection (Rekstads samling) at the University of Bergen Library.

== Legacy ==
The Rekstadfjella mountain group on the Svalbard archipelago is named after Rekstad.
