= Heggen =

Heggen is a surname. Notable people with the surname include:

- Almar Heggen (1933–2014), Norwegian opera singer
- Belinda Heggen, Australian journalist
- Joan Heggen, American mayor
- Lars Heggen (born 2005), Norwegian cross-country skier
- Tamara Heggen (born 1976), Australian figure skater
- Thomas Heggen (1918–1949), American writer
