= Alvestad =

Alvestad is a surname. Notable people with the surname include:

- Anton Ludvig Alvestad (1883–1956), Norwegian politician and government minister
- Olaus Alvestad (1866–1903), Norwegian educator and newspaper editor
- Per Olav Alvestad, Norwegian television host
