= Kasfjord =

Village in Harstad Municipality, Norway

- Village
- Interactive map of Kasfjord
- Location within Troms Location within Norway
- Coordinates: 68°50′08″N 16°20′42″E
- Country: Norway
- Region: Northern Norway
- County: Troms
- District: Central Hålogaland
- Municipality: Harstad Municipality

Area
  - Total: 0.34 km^{2} (0.13 sq mi)
- Elevation: 18 m (59 ft)

Population (2012)
  - Total: 247
  - Density: 730/km^{2} (1,900/sq mi)
- Time zone: UTC+01:00 (CET)
  - Summer (DST): UTC+02:00 (CEST)
- Post Code: 9402 Harstad

Kasfjord is a village in Harstad Municipality in Troms county, Norway. The village is located at the end of the Kasfjorden on the north side of Hinnøya island, about 10 kilometres (6.2 mi) west of the town of Harstad and about 12 kilometres (7.5 mi) south of the village of Elgsnes. The Kasfjordvatnet lake is located along the east side of the village.

The 0.34-square-kilometre (84-acre) village had a population (2012) of 247 and a population density of 726 inhabitants per square kilometre (1,880/sq mi). Since 2012, the population and area data for this village area has not been separately tracked by Statistics Norway.
