= Lundenes =

Village in Harstad Municipality, Norway

- Village
- Interactive map of Lundenes
- Location within Troms Location within Norway
- Coordinates: 68°52′39″N 16°33′57″E
- Country: Norway
- Region: Northern Norway
- County: Troms
- District: Central Hålogaland
- Municipality: Harstad Municipality
- Elevation: 5 m (16 ft)
- Time zone: UTC+01:00 (CET)
  - Summer (DST): UTC+02:00 (CEST)
- Post Code: 9420 Lundenes

Lundenes is a village in Harstad Municipality in Troms county, Norway. It is located on the eastern part of the island of Grytøya, along the Vågsfjorden, about 10 kilometres (6.2 mi) north of the town of Harstad. Lundenes Church is located in the village.
