= Trondenes =

Neighborhood in the town of Harstad, Norway

- Neighborhood in Harstad
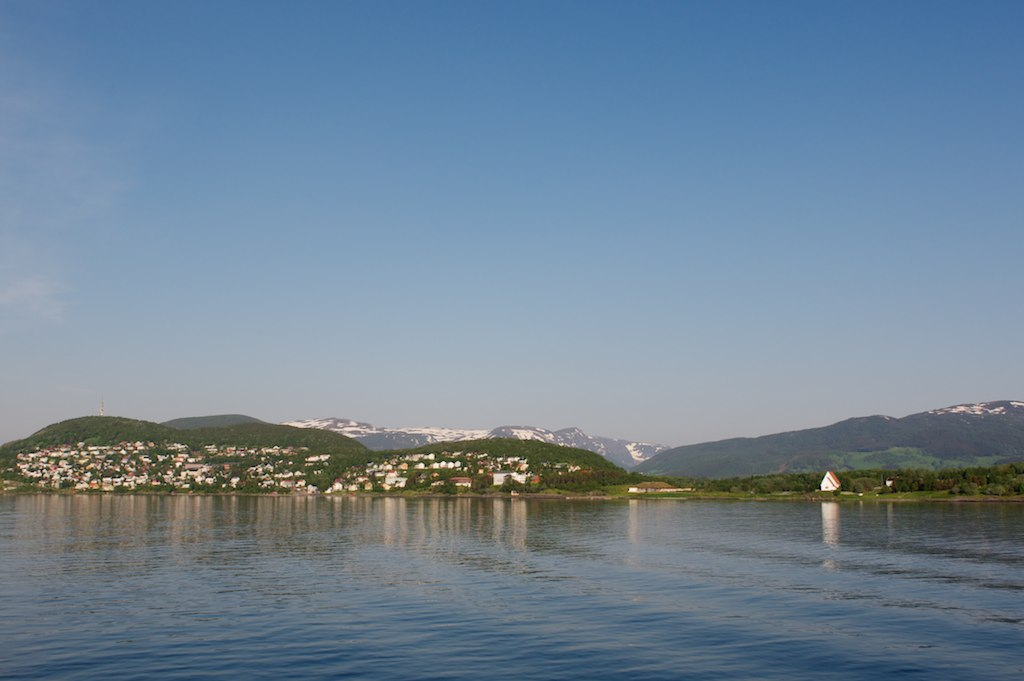
- View of the neighborhood (left) and church (right)
- Interactive map of Trondenes
- Location within Troms Location within Norway
- Coordinates: 68.81777°N 16.55049°E
- Country: Norway
- Region: Northern Norway
- County: Troms
- District: Central Hålogaland
- Municipality: Harstad Municipality
- Elevation: 43 m (141 ft)
- Time zone: UTC+01:00 (CET)
  - Summer (DST): UTC+02:00 (CEST)
- Post Code: 9404 Harstad

Trondenes is a neighborhood and parish in the town of Harstad in Harstad Municipality in Troms county, Norway. The area is located on the northern end of the town, on a peninsula in the Vågsfjorden. The village is notable for the Trondenes Fort at the northern tip of the peninsula as well as the medieval Trondenes Church.

== History ==
The medieval Trondenes Church was historically the centre of the large Trondenes prosti, a deanery in the Diocese of Hålogaland. According to tradition, the first Christians in Northern Norway were baptised, perhaps as early as the year 999, in the small pond, Laugen, just west of Trondenes Church. Many discoveries have been made around Trondenes from the Neolithic period and more recent eras. There are burial mounds from around 1020 located at Altevågen, a short distance north of the church.

Prior to the area becoming a part of the urban town of Harstad, the area near the church was a separate village which was the administrative centre of the large Trondenes Municipality which existed from 1838 until 1964, when it became part of Harstad Municipality.

=== Name ===
The municipality (originally the parish) is named after the old Trondenes farm (Old Norse: Þróndarnes) since the historic Trondenes Church was built there. The first element is the genitive case of the word þróndr which means "hog", referring to the shape of a nearby mountain. The last element is nes which means "headland". The shape of the headland has been compared with that of the snout of a hog.
