= Sandtorg =

Village in Harstad Municipality, Norway

- Village
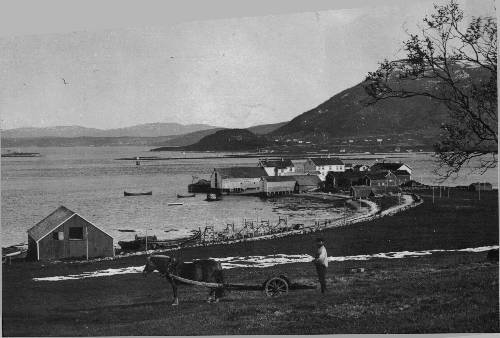
- View of the village (c. 1895)
- Interactive map of Sandtorg
- Location within Troms Location within Norway
- Coordinates: 68.5650°N 16.5093°E
- Country: Norway
- Region: Northern Norway
- County: Troms
- District: Hålogaland
- Municipality: Harstad Municipality
- Elevation: 1 m (3.3 ft)
- Time zone: UTC+01:00 (CET)
  - Summer (DST): UTC+02:00 (CEST)
- Post Code: 9430 Sandtorg

Sandtorg is a village in Harstad Municipality in Troms county, Norway. It is located on the eastern shore of the large island of Hinnøya, on the shore of the Tjeldsundet. The village is located along the European route E10 highway in the southern part of the municipality. There are about 300 residents in the village area. The 1,095-metre (3,593 ft) tall mountain Sætertinden is located northwest of the village of Sandtorg, along the border with Tjeldsund Municipality.

== History ==
Since the early 13th century, there has been a trading post at Sandtorgholmen (where the village of Sandtorg is located). This location became more important in the late 18th century when pilot services were added for foreign and local ships. The trading post continued to be a focal point of Sandtorg until 1945 when the Norwegian Army's communication services took over the facilities after the German occupation (1940–1945). The army returned Sandtorgholmen to civilian use in the 1990s. Today, the Sandtorgholmen trading post features a hotel with a harbor restaurant and meeting facilities.

Sandtorg Municipality was established on 1 July 1926, when it was split from the large Trondenes Municipality. On 1 January 1964, Sandtorg was merged with the neighboring municipalities of Harstad and Trondenes to form the new Harstad Municipality.

Bjarne Berg-Sæther (born 1919) was a significant leader in Sandtorg during the 20th century. He was the mayor of Sandtorg Municipality from 1948 until 1964 when it was merged with Harstad Municipality. He was also the first mayor of the newly merged Harstad Municipality, which occurred in 1964 (and therefore also the last mayor of Sandtorg). During his 20 years as mayor after World War II, boat building factories at Rødskjæret were added, lighted ski tracks, and a community cultural house was built. Many of these additions caused Sandtorg's population to almost double. Today, Sandtorg is a community in transition from farming, fishing, and meat production to a commuter community with a significant part of the population working in the town of Harstad about 37 kilometres (23 mi) away.

== Name ==
The village (originally the parish) is named after the old Sandtorg farm (Old Norse: Sandþorghom). The first element is sandr which means "sandy area". The last element is torg which means "town square" or "marketplace".
