= Harstad =

Harstad may refer to:

== Places ==
- Harstad (town), a town in Harstad Municipality in Troms county, Norway
- Harstad Municipality, a municipality in Troms county, Norway
- Harstad Church, a church in Harstad Municipality in Troms county, Norway
- Harstad/Narvik Airport, Evenes, an airport in Evenes Municipality in Nordland county, Norway
- Harstad Slough, a lake in Stevens County, Minnesota in the United States
- Harstad Camping, a campground in Harstad Municipality in Troms county, Norway

== People ==
- Bjug Harstad (1848–1933), Lutheran pastor who was the first president of the Evangelical Lutheran Synod in the USA
- Donald Harstad, American novelist and former police officer
- Erle Harstad (born 1990), Norwegian figure skater
- Johan Harstad (born 1979), Norwegian novelist, short story writer, playwright and graphic designer
- Oscar Harstad (1892–1985), American Major League Baseball pitcher
- Snorre Harstad (born 1971), retired Norwegian football defender
- Trude Harstad (born 1974), former Norwegian biathlete

== Sports ==
- Harstad IL, a sports club from Harstad Municipality in Troms county, Norway
- Harstad Aliens, a former basketball team from Harstad Municipality in Troms county, Norway
- Harstad Vikings, a former basketball team from Harstad Municipality in Troms county, Norway
- Harstad Travpark, a harness racing track located at Langmoan in Harstad Municipality in Troms county, Norway

== Other ==
- NoCGV Harstad, an offshore patrol vessel for the Norwegian Coast Guard
- Harstad Tidende, a regional newspaper based in Harstad Municipality in Troms county, Norway
- Harstad University College, a former college in Troms county, Norway
