= Kanebogen =

Neighborhood in the town of Harstad, Norway

- Neighborhood in Harstad
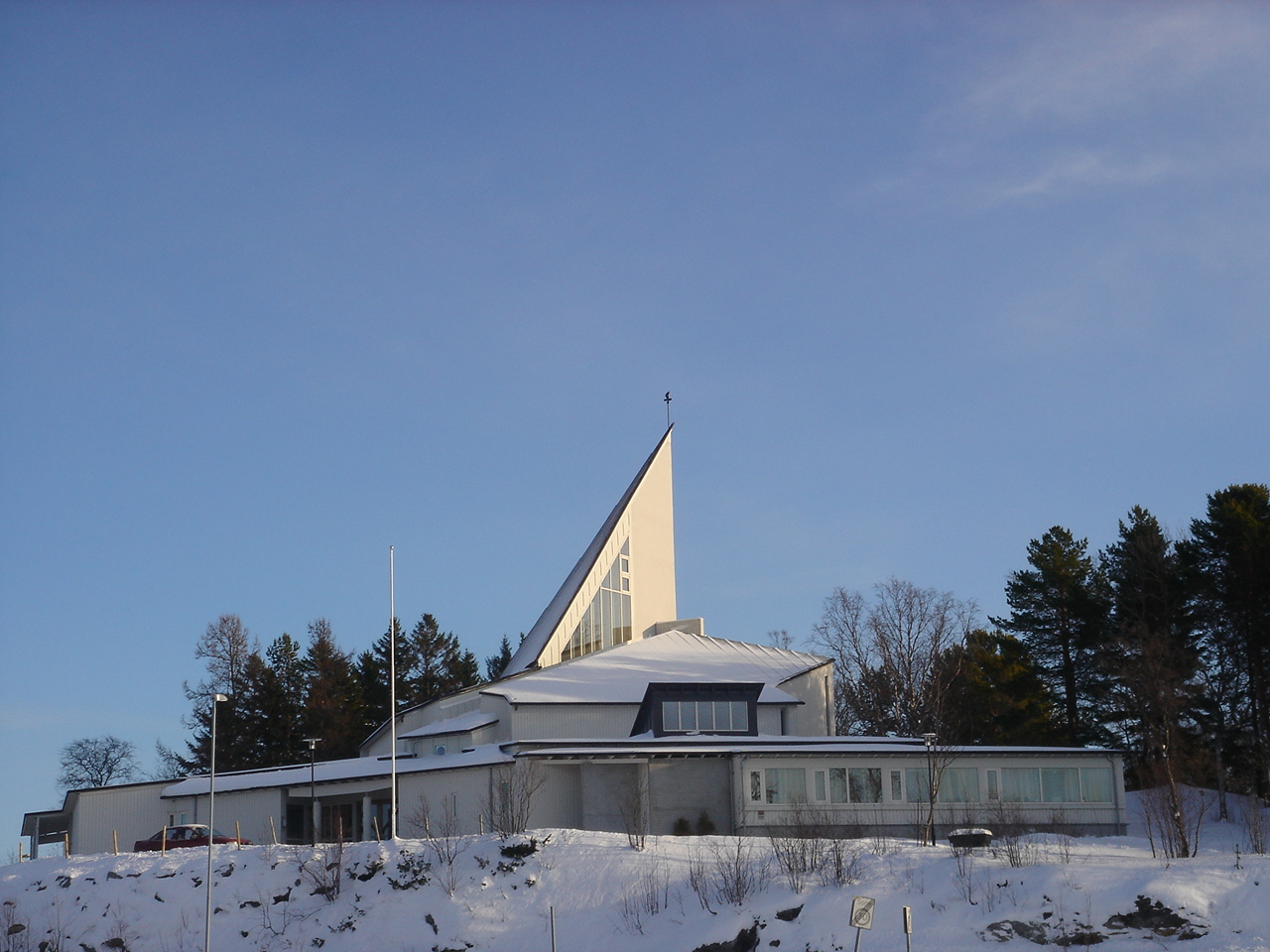
- View of the local church
- Interactive map of Kanebogen
- Location within Troms Location within Norway
- Coordinates: 68°46′20″N 16°33′08″E
- Country: Norway
- Region: Northern Norway
- County: Troms
- District: Central Hålogaland
- Municipality: Harstad Municipality
- Elevation: 45 m (148 ft)
- Time zone: UTC+01:00 (CET)
  - Summer (DST): UTC+02:00 (CEST)

Kanebogen is a neighborhood within the town of Harstad which is located in Harstad Municipality in Troms county, Norway. It is located about 5 km (3.1 mi) south of the city center. Kanebogen borders the neighborhoods of Gansås to the north, Stangnes to the northeast, Medkila to the south, and Grønnebakkan to the northwest.

Kanebogen School and the adjacent Kanebogen Stadion (stadium) are located in this area, as are Harstad Camping, Kanebogen Church, and the Kanebogen Senter (shopping center).

Kanebogen was the northernmost part of the old Sandtorg Municipality which was merged with Harstad Municipality in 1964.
