= Seljestad =

Seljestad may refer to:

== Places ==
- Seljestad, Vestland, a village in Ullensvang municipality in Vestland county, Norway
- Seljestad, Troms, a village in Harstad municipality in Troms county, Norway
