= Kanebogen School =

Elementary school in Norway

Coordinates: 68.78°N 16.558°E

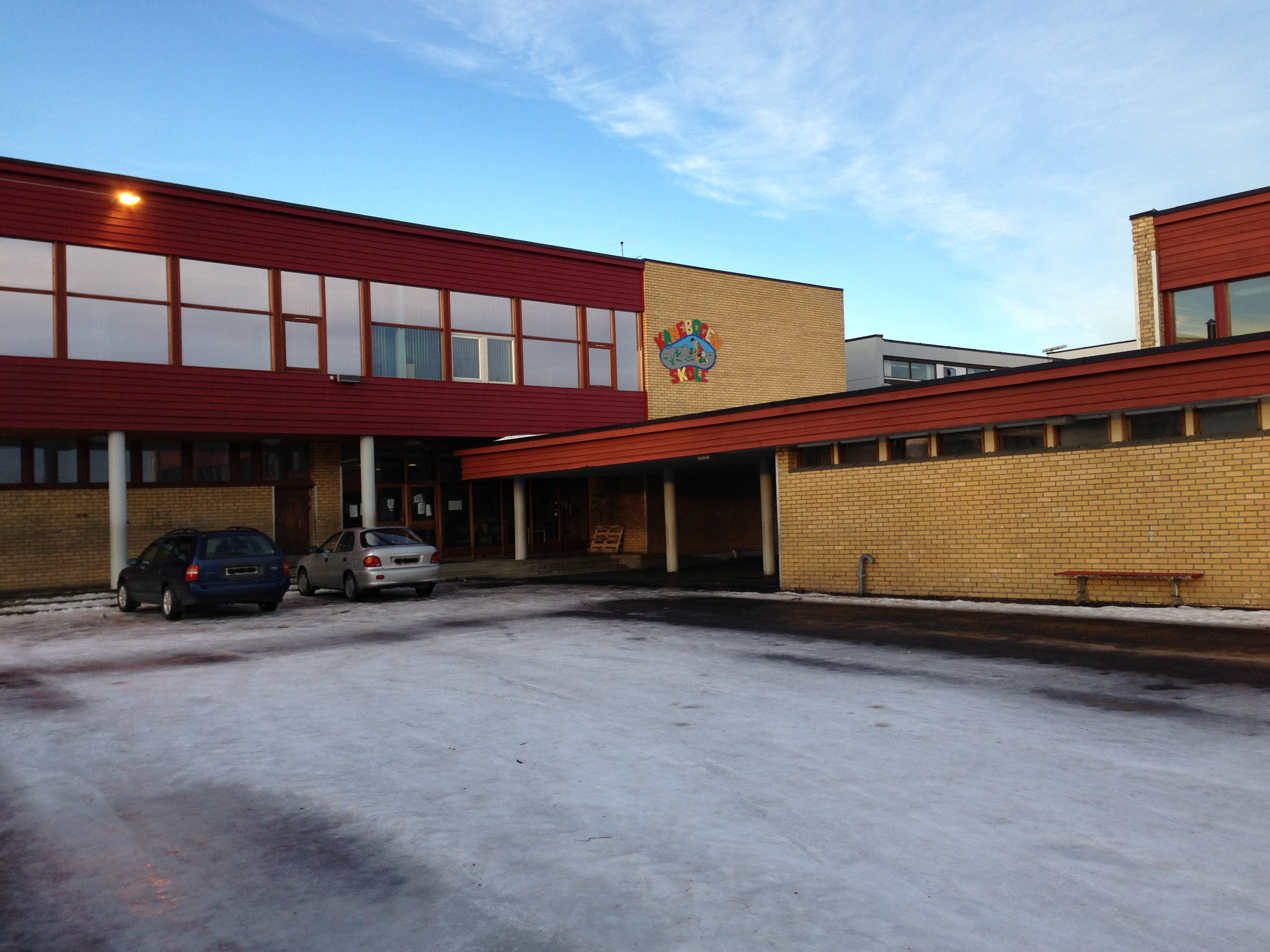
The southern/older part of the school (from 1963).

Kanebogen skole is an elementary school in Kanebogen, a part of Harstad city in Northern Norway. It has more than 300 pupils in classes from 1st to 7th grade, and about 50 employees. Situated next to the school on the northern side is a stadium for sports, Kanebogen Stadion, which opened in 1979.

== School shooting ==
On the morning of 28 April 2009, a nine-year-old boy in the fourth grade brought a 12-gauge shotgun and ammunition to the school. He first fired a shot at the southern part of the school, or at the stadium north of it. The gun, which had a single barrel, was then reloaded by the boy.

A female teacher, Margrethe Tresselt, talked to the boy with no result. A second shot went off, within the schoolyard, when the teacher grabbed the gun. No one was hit, but many children witnessed the event as they were about to enter the school for the first period. A pupil called the police at 08:34 local time.

A reason given for the incident was that the boy had been bullied by an older pupil, according to the lawyer representing the family of the shooter – who continued as a pupil at the school. The father of the boy was fined 10 000 NOK (May 2009 average: €1139 or US$1553) for not keeping his two guns (the shotgun and a rifle) and ammunition according to the rules. The police also confiscated the weapons and ammunition (all of which he had legally owned). This was the first school shooting in Norway.

== Notable alumni ==
- Per-Willy Amundsen, politician
