= Medkila =

Neighborhood in the town of Harstad, Norway

- Neighborhood in Harstad
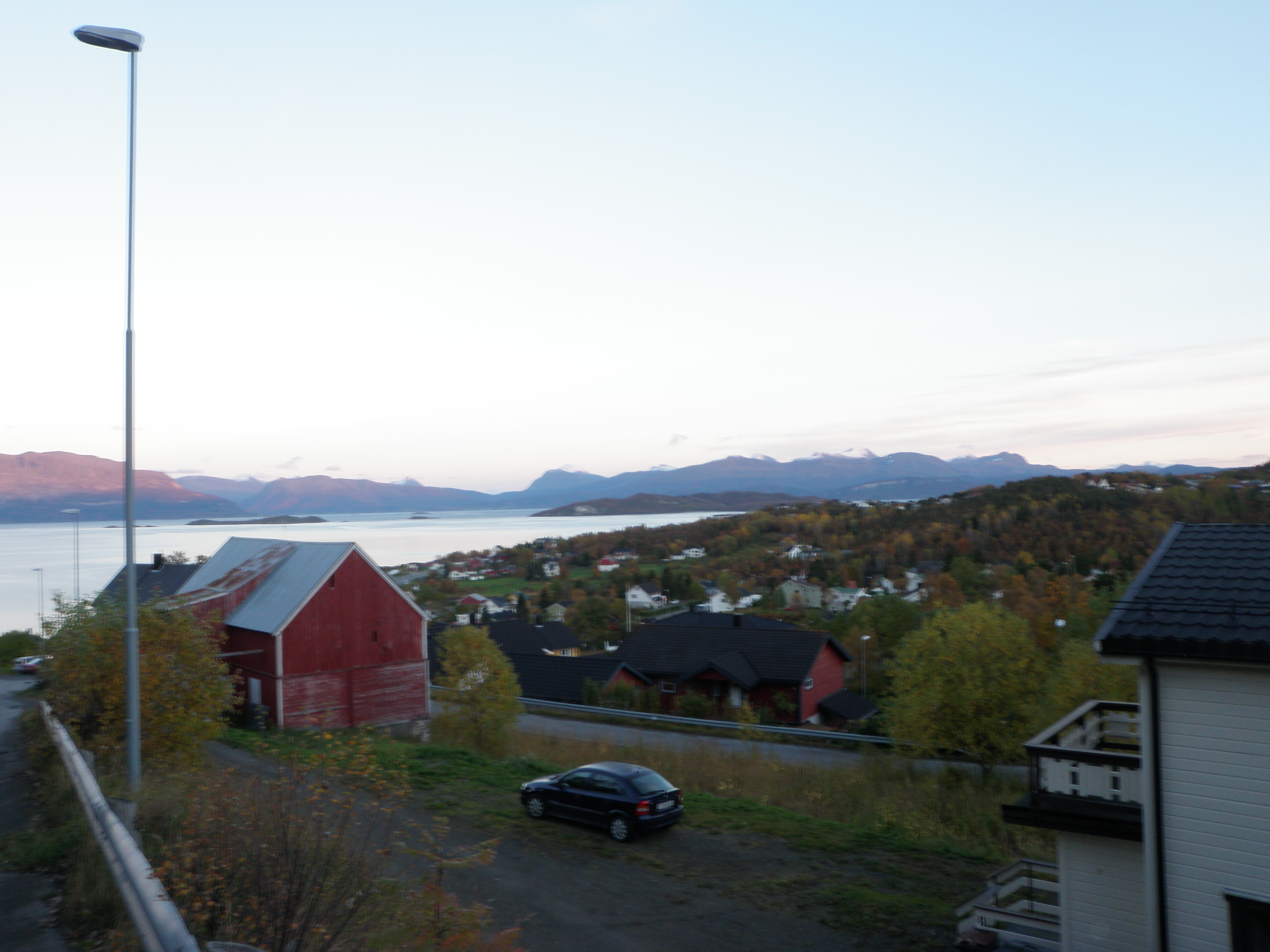
- View of the area
- Interactive map of Medkila
- Location within Troms Location within Norway
- Coordinates: 68°45′49″N 16°33′29″E
- Country: Norway
- Region: Northern Norway
- County: Troms
- District: Central Hålogaland
- Municipality: Harstad Municipality
- Elevation: 20 m (66 ft)
- Time zone: UTC+01:00 (CET)
  - Summer (DST): UTC+02:00 (CEST)

Medkila is a neighborhood within the town of Harstad which is located in Harstad Municipality in Troms county, Norway. It's located south of the neighborhood of Kanebogen and north of the neighborhood of Holtet, about 6 km (3.7 mi) south of the city center. The name of the area was previously spelled Midkila and Mekile.

Medkila's women's football team won the Norwegian Football Cup in 2003. Medkila skole, an elementary school, is also located in the area.
