= Kanebogen Church =

- Kanebogen kirke
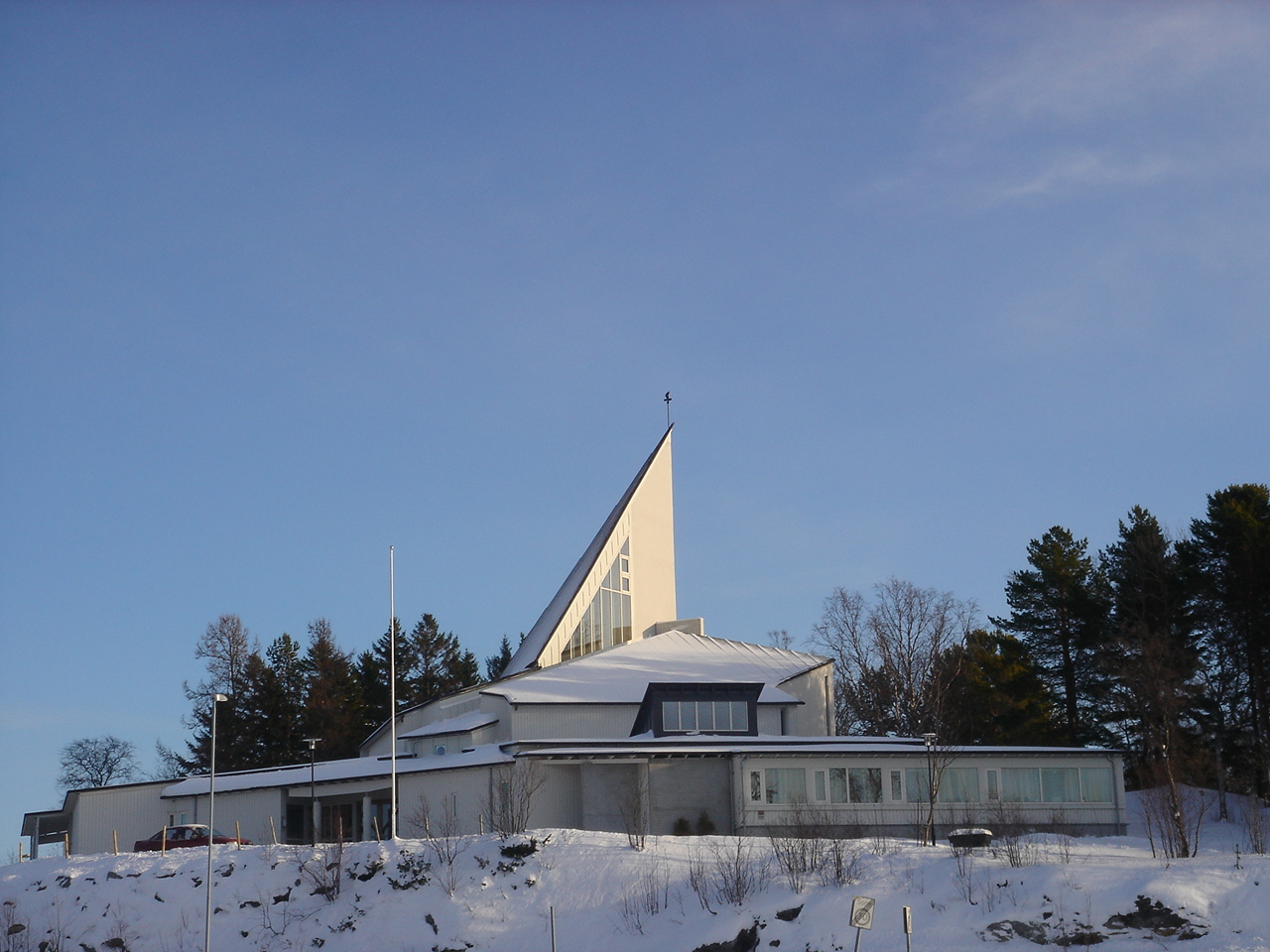
- View of the church
- Kanebogen Church
- 68.7805354°N 16.5687743°E
- Location: Harstad Municipality, Troms
- Country: Norway
- Denomination: Church of Norway
- Churchmanship: Evangelical Lutheran

History
- Status: Parish church
- Founded: 1996
- Consecrated: 19 December 1999

Architecture
- Functional status: Active
- Architect(s): Ivar Tolo and Jim Myrstad
- Architectural type: Rectangular
- Groundbreaking: 1996
- Completed: 1999 (27 years ago)

Specifications
- Capacity: 400
- Materials: Wood and concrete

Administration
- Diocese: Nord-Hålogaland
- Deanery: Trondenes prosti
- Parish: Kanebogen

Kanebogen Church (Norwegian: Kanebogen kirke) is a parish church of the Church of Norway in Harstad Municipality in Troms county, Norway. It is located in the Kanebogen area of the town of Harstad on the island of Hinnøya. It is the church for the Kanebogen parish which is part of the Trondenes prosti (deanery) in the Diocese of Nord-Hålogaland. The white, wood and concrete church was built in a rectangular style in 1999 using plans drawn up by the architects Ivar Tolo and Jim Myrstad. The church seats about 400 people.

== History ==
The church was built to replace the old Fredly Chapel that burned down on this site in 1984. After many years of planning, authorization for the new church was given and it was to be upgraded to a full parish church, rather than the chapel status of its predecessor. The congregation met in a rented room in a shopping centre while funds for the new church were raised. The church was completed in 1999, and as such it was the last new church building completed in Norway prior to the turn of the new millennium. The church was consecrated on 19 December 1999 by the Bishop Ola Steinholt.

== Media gallery ==
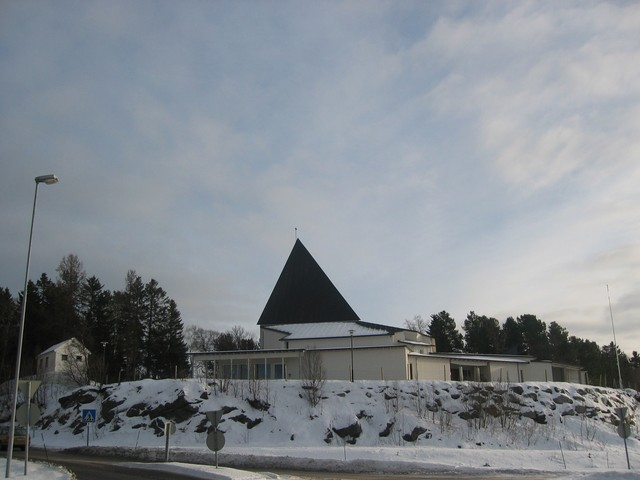

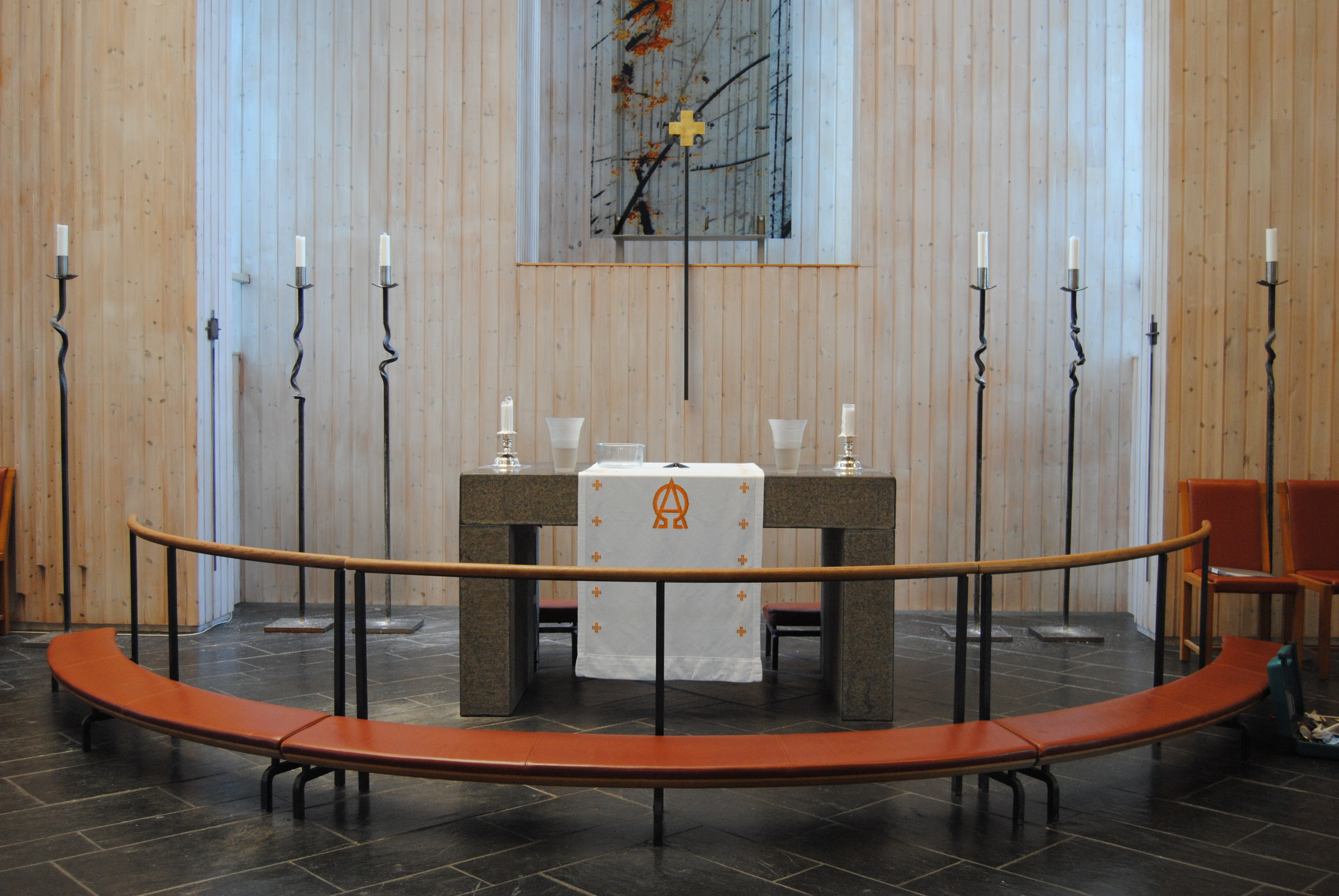

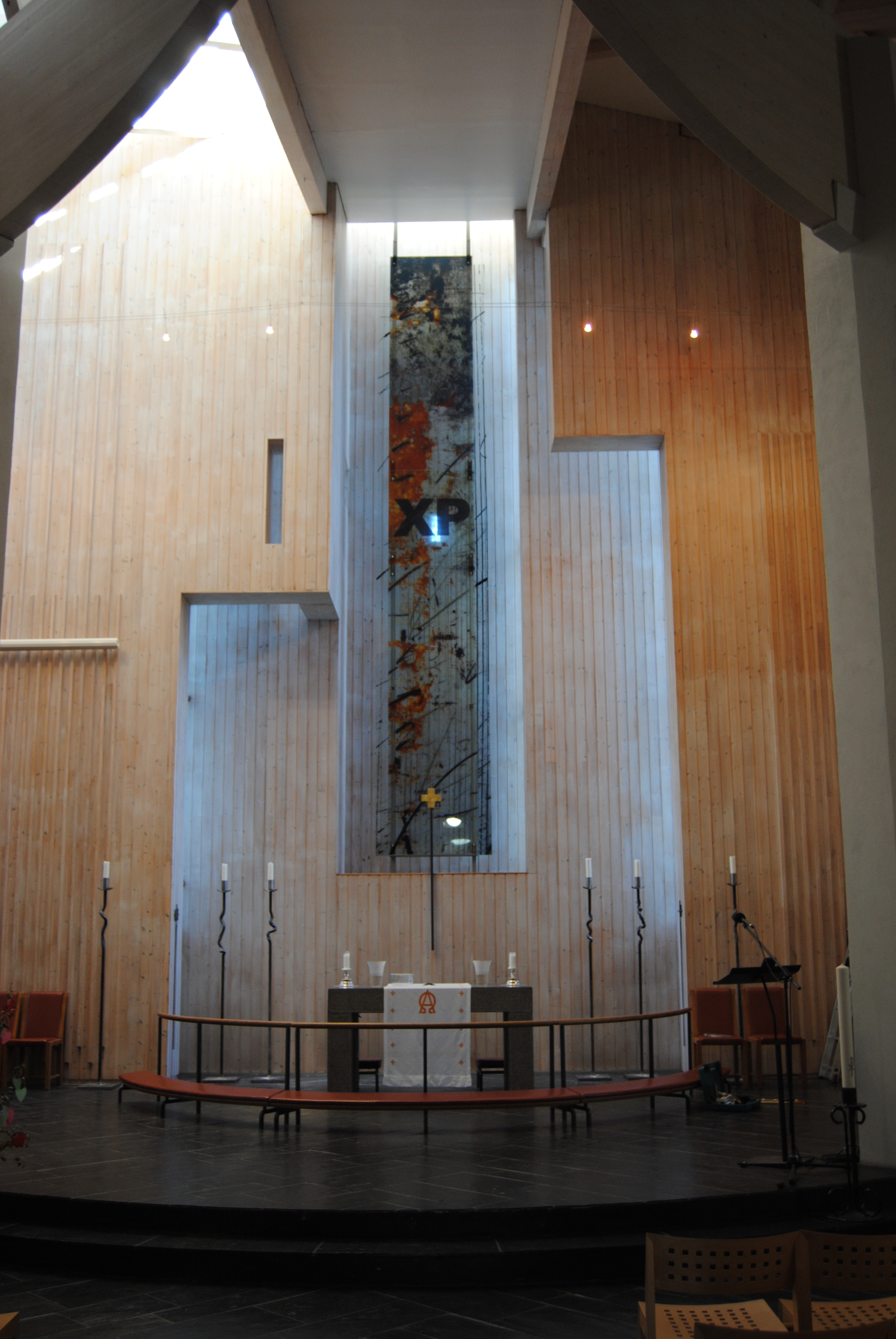

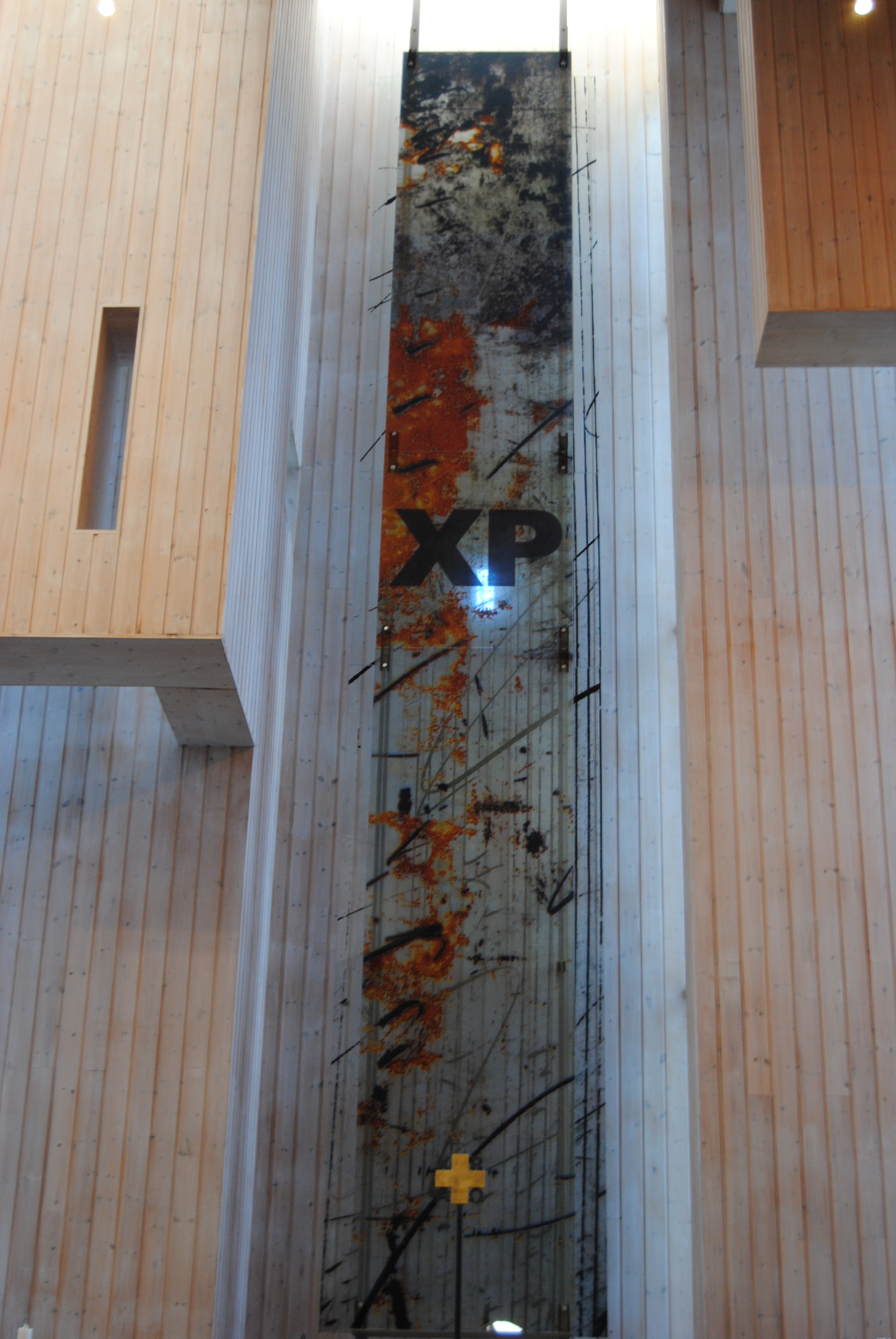

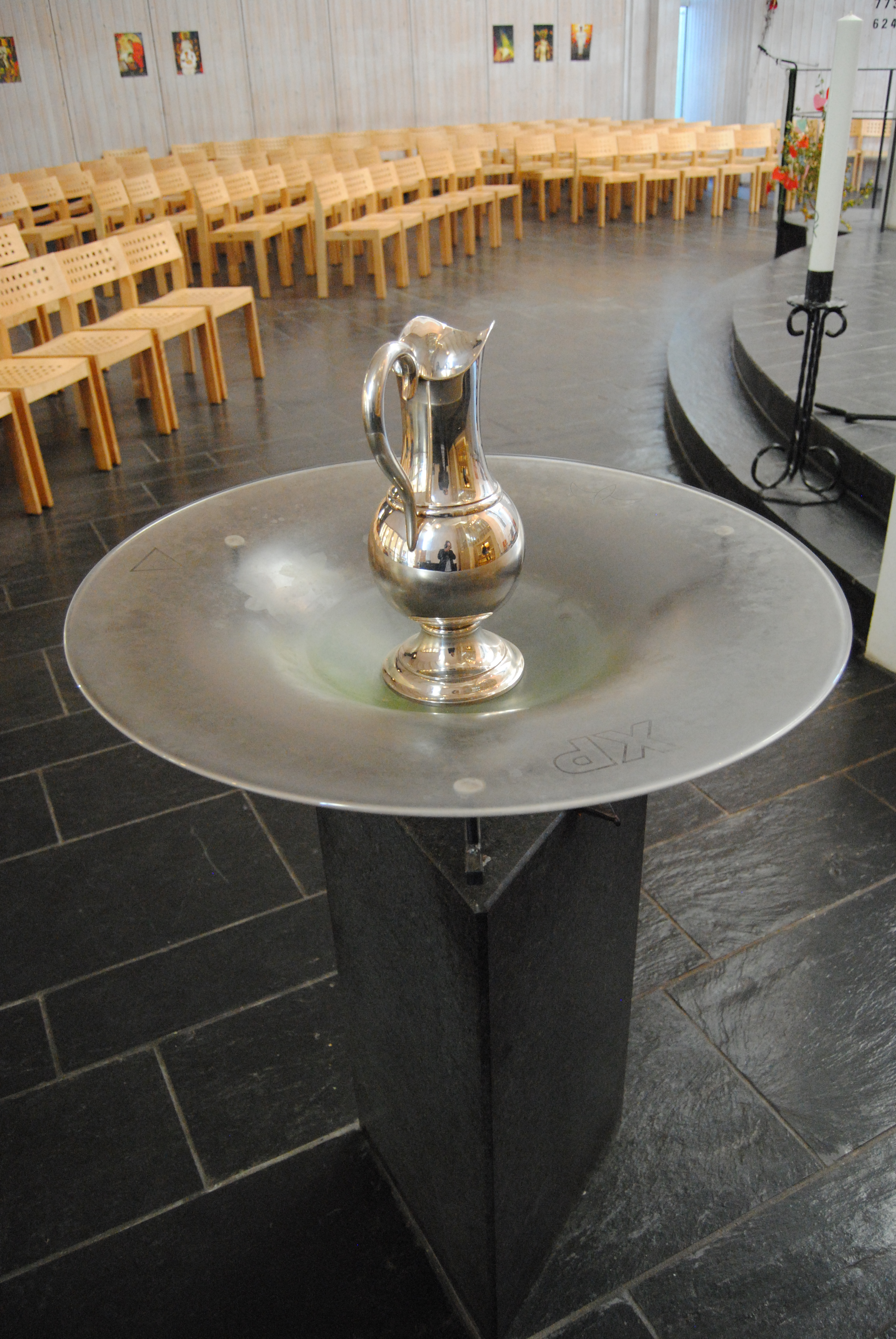

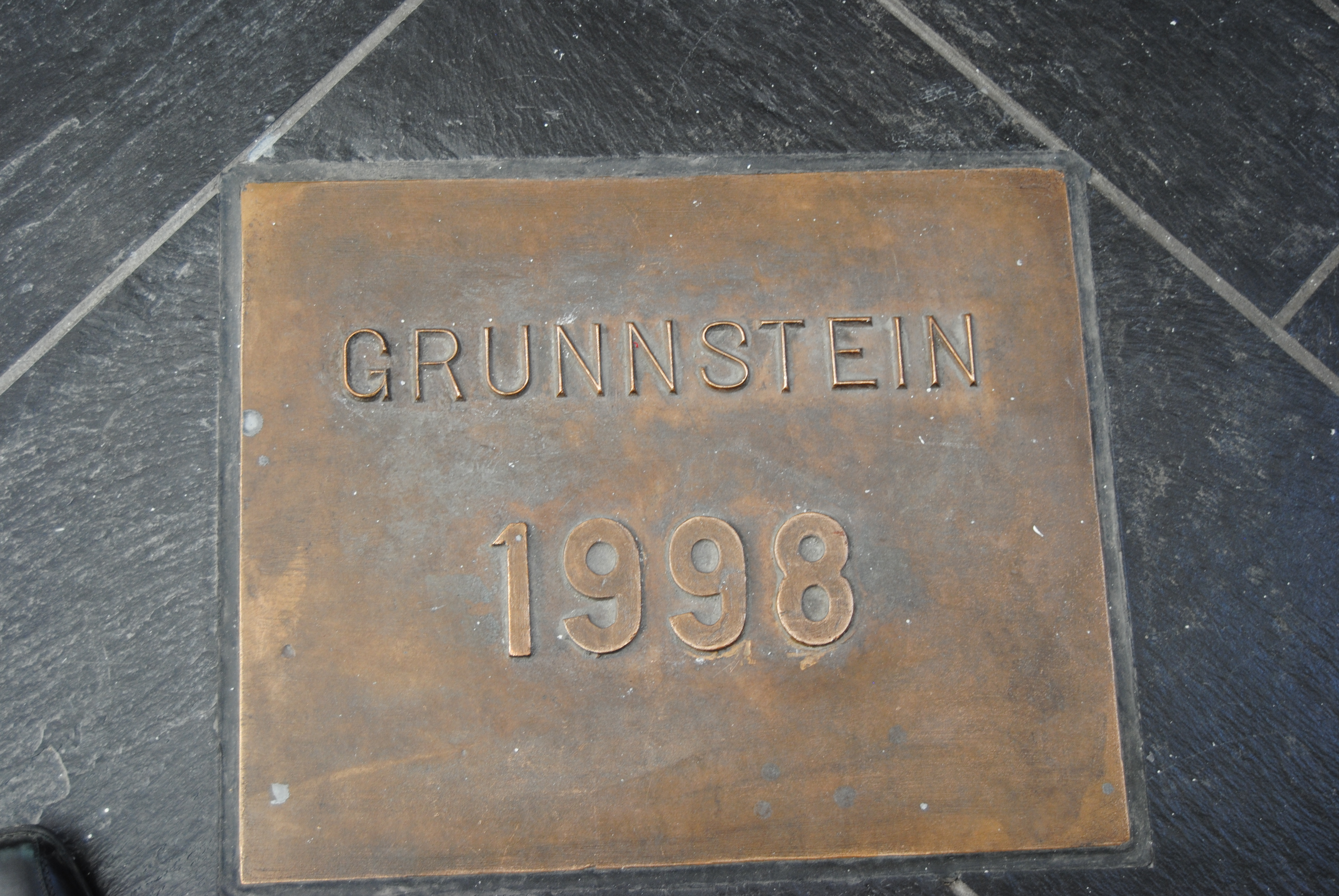

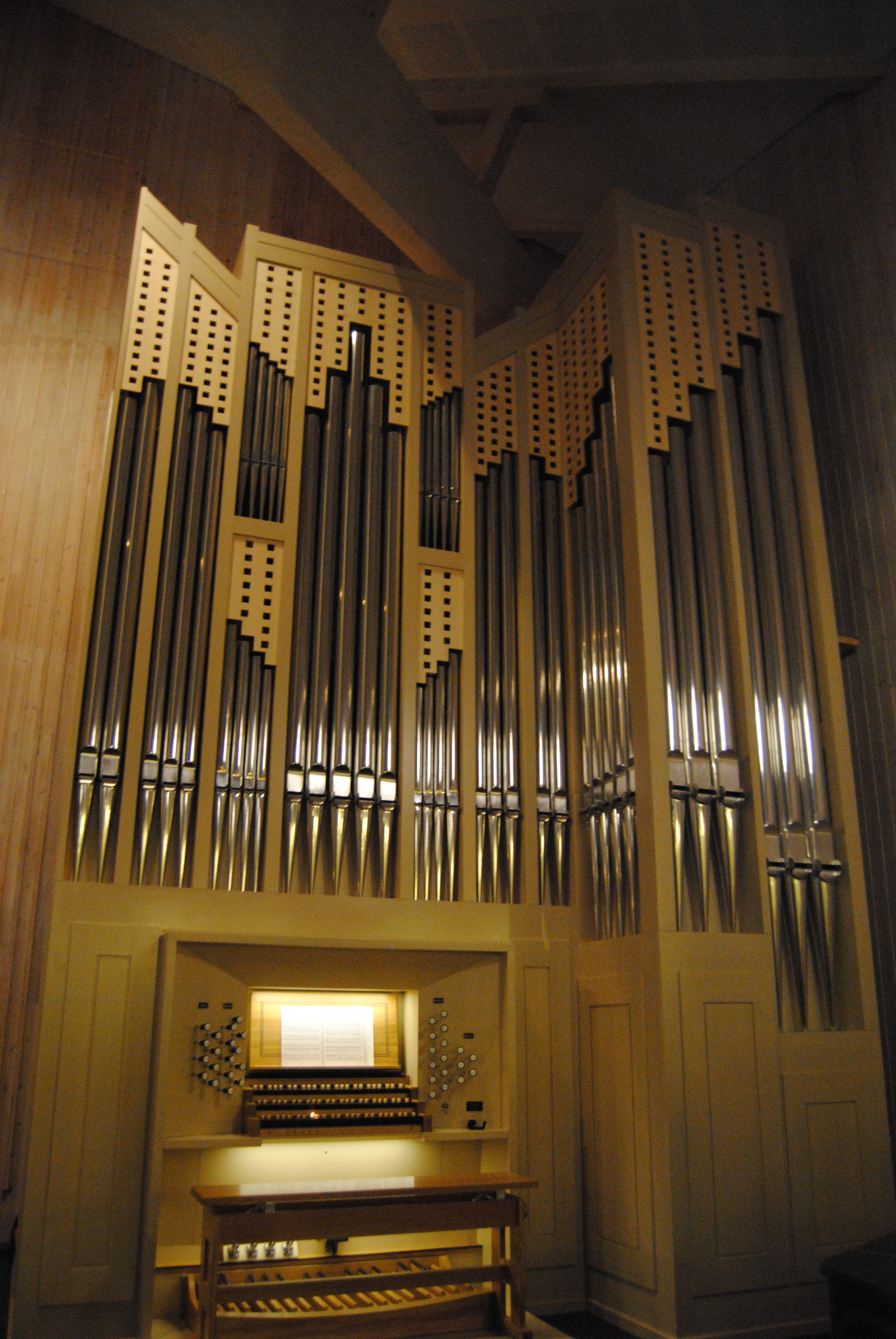

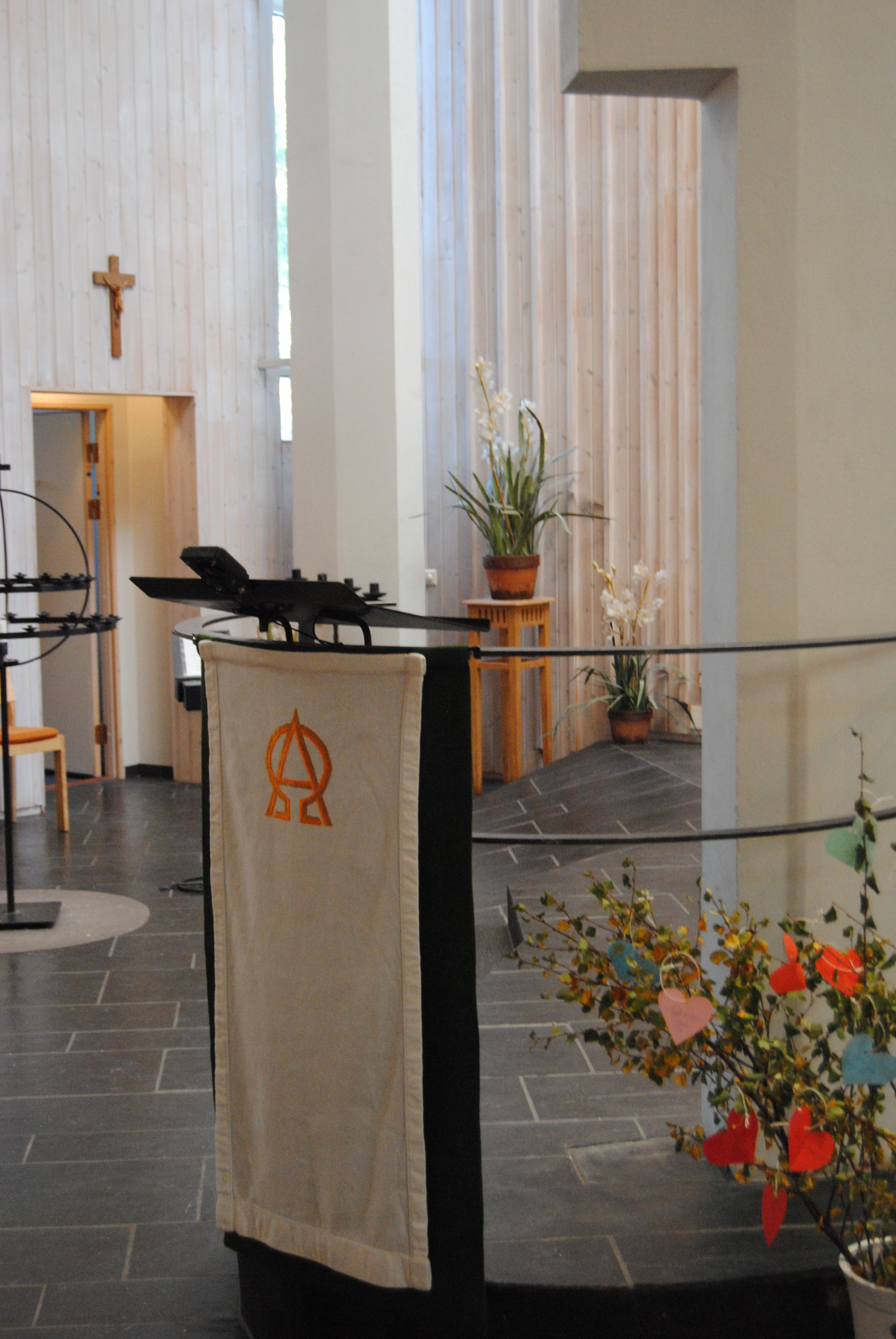

== See also ==
- List of churches in Nord-Hålogaland
