= Sama (Harstad) =

Neighborhood in the town of Harstad, Norway

- Neighborhood in Harstad
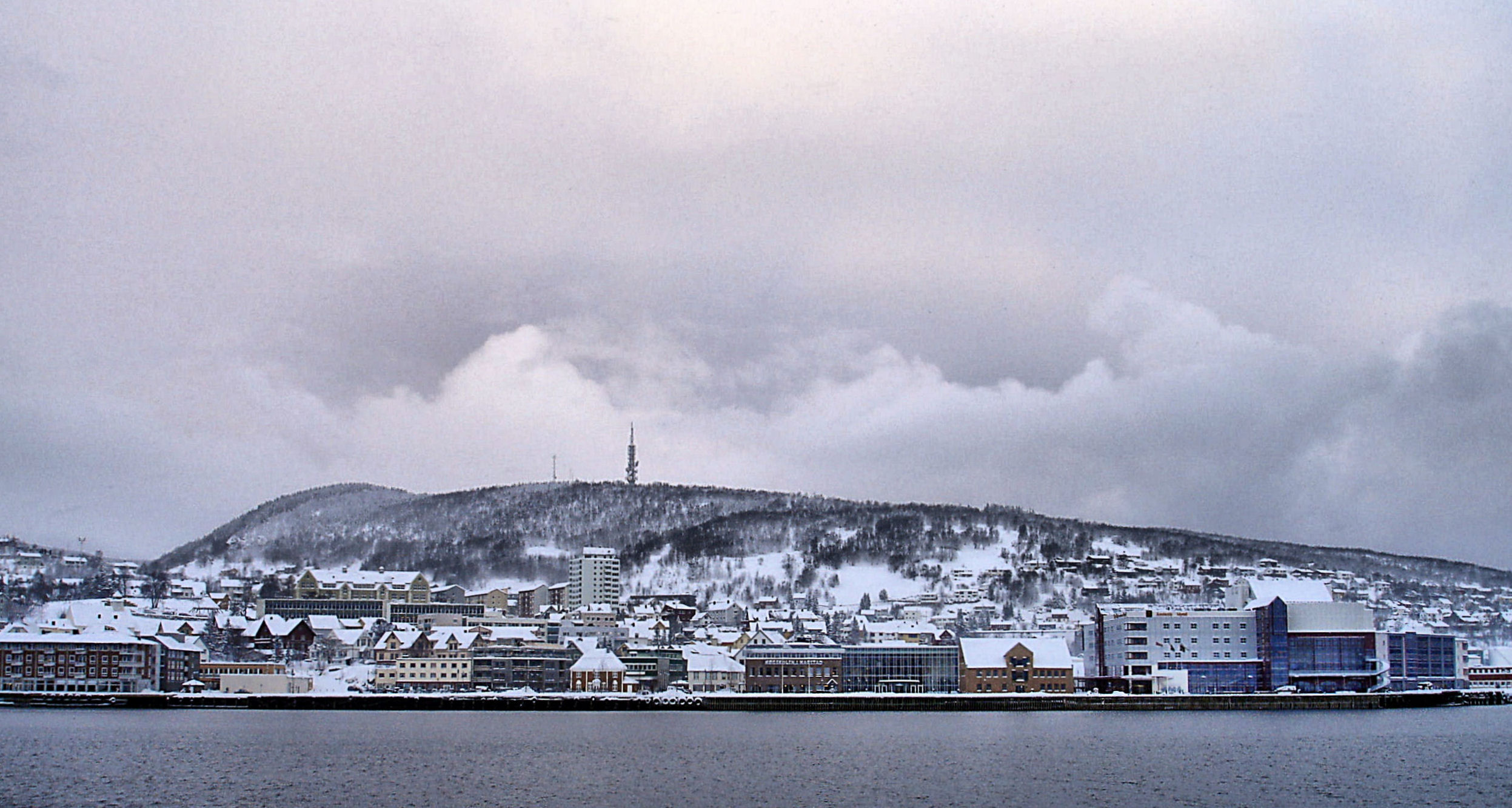
- View of the area with the Samaåsen hill in the background
- Interactive map of Sama
- Location within Troms Location within Norway
- Coordinates: 68°48′21″N 16°30′53″E
- Country: Norway
- Region: Northern Norway
- County: Troms
- District: Central Hålogaland
- Municipality: Harstad Municipality
- Elevation: 47 m (154 ft)
- Time zone: UTC+01:00 (CET)
  - Summer (DST): UTC+02:00 (CEST)

Sama is a neighborhood within the town of Harstad which is located in Harstad Municipality in Troms county, Norway. It is located just northwest of the city center. To the north is the Samaåsen hill, to the south is the Harstadåsen hill, to the southwest is the Blåbærhaugen hill, and to the west is Bergseng. The street Samagata goes through the area.

Situated in Sama are shops, a gas station and different services, along with many people living in the area.
