= Grønnebakkan =

Neighborhood in the town of Harstad, Norway

- Neighborhood in Harstad
- Interactive map of Grønnebakkan
- Location within Troms Location within Norway
- Coordinates: 68°46′50″N 16°32′19″E
- Country: Norway
- Region: Northern Norway
- County: Troms
- District: Central Hålogaland
- Municipality: Harstad Municipality
- Elevation: 70 m (230 ft)
- Time zone: UTC+01:00 (CET)
  - Summer (DST): UTC+02:00 (CEST)

Grønnebakkan is a neighborhood within the town of Harstad which is located in Harstad Municipality in Troms county, Norway. It is located about 4 km (2.5 mi) south of the city centre, just south of Gansås, west of Kanebogen, east of Harstadbotn, and southeast of Seljestad.

Development there started during the late 1970s on a large hill overlooking the city. The upper part was originally built to house employees of the local hospital and police, but as development continued other people also bought property and settled there. New development in 1985 in the upper regions. Grønnebakkan Kindergarten (Grønnebakkan Barnehage) opened in 1995, and is a privately owned kindergarten. It is one of Harstad's biggest and newest kindergartens and it has contributed to more and more family settlements in Grønnebakkan.

Before the development began, this area is the location of paths which led to the nearby lakes Pevatnet and Musvatnet. These were popular paths for hiking through the woods and mountains. Most of these paths still exist today but because of deforestation these paths are not as popular and used as they once used to be. Grønnebakkan is known for its panoramic view over the city of Harstad.
