= Seljestad, Troms =

Neighborhood in the town of Harstad, Norway

Seljestad
- Neighborhood in Harstad
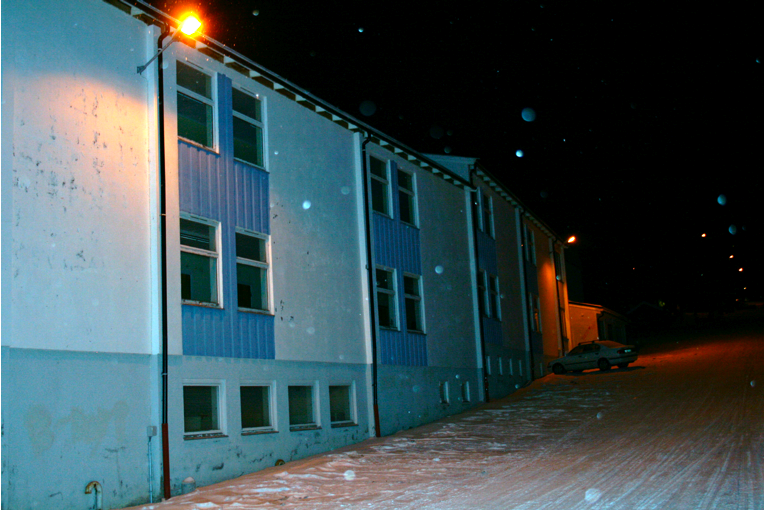
- View of the local school
- Interactive map of Seljestad
- Location within Troms Location within Norway
- Coordinates: 68°47′26″N 16°31′22″E
- Country: Norway
- Region: Northern Norway
- County: Troms
- District: Central Hålogaland
- Municipality: Harstad Municipality
- Elevation: 58 m (190 ft)
- Time zone: UTC+01:00 (CET)
  - Summer (DST): UTC+02:00 (CEST)

Seljestad is a neighborhood within the town of Harstad which is located in Harstad Municipality in Troms county, Norway. It is located to the south of the city center and north of the neighborhoods of Harstadbotn and Grønnebakkan.

The primary and secondary schools, Seljestad barneskole and Seljestad ungdomsskole are located here, just west of Seljestadvegen street.
