= Sandtorg Municipality =

Former municipality in Troms, Norway

Sandtorg Municipality Sandtorg herred
- Former municipality
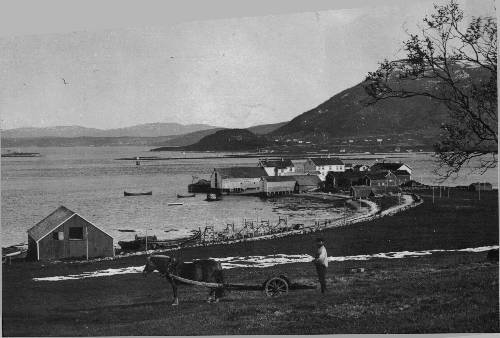
- View of Sandtorgholmen (c. 1895)

- Troms within Norway

- Sandtorg within Troms
- Coordinates: 68.6657°N 16.5586°E
- Country: Norway
- County: Troms
- District: Central Hålogaland
- Established: 1926
  - Preceded by: Trondenes Municipality
- Disestablished: 1 Jan 1964
  - Succeeded by: Harstad Municipality
- Administrative centre: Harstad

Government
  - Mayor (1948-1963): Bjarne Berg-Sæther (Ap)

Area (upon dissolution)
  - Total: 176.6 km^{2} (68.2 sq mi)
  - Rank: #404 in Norway
- Highest elevation: 1,094.7 m (3,592 ft)

Population (1963)
  - Total: 7,398
  - Rank: #105 in Norway
  - Density: 41.9/km^{2} (109/sq mi)
  - Change (10 years): ▲ +31.4%
- Demonym: Sandtorging

Official language
  - Norwegian form: Neutral
- Time zone: UTC+01:00 (CET)
  - Summer (DST): UTC+02:00 (CEST)
- ISO 3166 code: NO-1912

Sandtorg is a former municipality in Troms county, Norway. The 176.6-square-kilometre (68.2 sq mi) municipality existed from 1926 until its dissolution in 1964. The municipality included the southern part of what is now Harstad Municipality on the eastern coast of the island of Hinnøya as well as some smaller islands in the Vågsfjorden. The administrative centre was actually located in the town of Harstad, immediately north of Sandtorg (although Harstad was not in Sandtorg Municipality). Sandtorg Church, the main church for the municipality was in the village of Sørvika.

Prior to its dissolution in 1964, the 176.6-square-kilometre (68.2 sq mi) municipality was the 404th largest by area out of the 689 municipalities in Norway. Sandtorg Municipality was the 105th most populous municipality in Norway with a population of about 7,398. The municipality's population density was 41.9 inhabitants per square kilometre (109/sq mi) and its population had increased by 31.4% over the previous 10-year period.

== General information ==
The municipality of Sandtorg was established on 1 July 1926, when the large Trondenes Municipality was divided into three separate municipalities. The areas east of the Tjeldsundet strait and east of the Vågsfjorden (population: 2,443) became Skånland Municipality and the areas on the west side of the Tjeldsundet and Vågsfjorden were split two ways. The southern part (population: 4,224) became Sandtorg Municipality and the northern part (population: 3,429) remained as Trondenes Municipality.

During the 1960s, there were many municipal mergers across Norway due to the work of the Schei Committee. On 1 January 1964, Trondenes Municipality (population: 6,567), Sandtorg Municipality (population: 7,512), the town of Harstad (population: 3,808) were merged to form a new, larger Harstad Municipality.

=== Name ===
The municipality (originally the parish) is named after the old Sandtorg farm (Old Norse: Sandþorghom). The first element is sandr which means "sandy area". The last element is torg which means "town square" or "marketplace".

=== Churches ===
The Church of Norway had one parish (sokn) within Sandtorg Municipality. At the time of the municipal dissolution, it was part of the Trondenes prosti (deanery) in the Diocese of Nord-Hålogaland.

Churches in Sandtorg Municipality
Parish (sokn)	Church name	Location of the church	Year built
Sandtorg	Sandtorg Church	Sørvika	1932

== History ==
Since the early 13th century, there has been a trading post at Sandtorgholmen (where the village of Sandtorg is located). This location became more important in the late 18th century when pilot services were added for foreign and local ships. The trading post continued to be a focal point of Sandtorg until 1945 when the Norwegian Army's communication services took over the facilities after the German occupation (1940–1945). The army returned Sandtorgholmen to civilian use in the 1990s. Today, the Sandtorgholmen trading post features a hotel with a harbor restaurant and meeting facilities.

Bjarne Berg-Sæther (born 1919) was a significant leader in Sandtorg during the 20th century. He was the mayor of Sandtorg from 1948 until 1964 when it was merged with Harstad. He was also the first mayor of the newly merged municipality of Harstad, which occurred in 1964 (and therefore also the last mayor of Sandtorg). During his 20 years as mayor after World War II, boat building factories at Rødskjæret were added, lighted ski tracks, and a community cultural house was built. Many of these additions caused Sandtorg's population to almost double. Today, Sandtorg is a community in transition from farming, fishing, and meat production to a commuter community with a significant part of the population working in Harstad about 37 kilometres (23 mi) away.

== Geography ==
The highest point in the municipality was the 1,094.7-metre (3,592 ft) tall mountain Sætertinden, located on the southern border of the municipality.

== Government ==
While it existed, Sandtorg Municipality was responsible for primary education (through 10th grade), outpatient health services, senior citizen services, welfare and other social services, zoning, economic development, and municipal roads and utilities. The municipality was governed by a municipal council of directly elected representatives. The mayor was indirectly elected by a vote of the municipal council. The municipality was under the jurisdiction of the Hålogaland Court of Appeal.

=== Municipal council ===
The municipal council (Herredsstyre) of Sandtorg Municipality was made up of 35 representatives that were elected to four year terms. The tables below show the historical composition of the council by political party.

Sandtorg herredsstyre 1959–1963
Party name (in Norwegian)	Number of representatives
Labour Party (Arbeiderpartiet)	17
Conservative Party (Høyre)	9
Christian Democratic Party (Kristelig Folkeparti)	2
Centre Party (Senterpartiet)	2
Liberal Party (Venstre)	4
Local List(s) (Lokale lister)	1
Total number of members:	35
Note: On 1 January 1964, Sandtorg Municipality became part of Harstad Municipality.

Sandtorg herredsstyre 1955–1959
Party name (in Norwegian)	Number of representatives
Labour Party (Arbeiderpartiet)	18
Conservative Party (Høyre)	6
Communist Party (Kommunistiske Parti)	1
Christian Democratic Party (Kristelig Folkeparti)	3
Liberal Party (Venstre)	6
Local List(s) (Lokale lister)	1
Total number of members:	35

Sandtorg herredsstyre 1951–1955
Party name (in Norwegian)	Number of representatives
Labour Party (Arbeiderpartiet)	13
Conservative Party (Høyre)	3
Communist Party (Kommunistiske Parti)	1
Christian Democratic Party (Kristelig Folkeparti)	2
Liberal Party (Venstre)	4
Local List(s) (Lokale lister)	1
Total number of members:	24

Sandtorg herredsstyre 1947–1951
Party name (in Norwegian)	Number of representatives
Labour Party (Arbeiderpartiet)	11
Communist Party (Kommunistiske Parti)	2
Christian Democratic Party (Kristelig Folkeparti)	2
Joint List(s) of Non-Socialist Parties (Borgerlige Felleslister)	9
Total number of members:	24

Sandtorg herredsstyre 1945–1947
Party name (in Norwegian)	Number of representatives
Labour Party (Arbeiderpartiet)	12
Communist Party (Kommunistiske Parti)	3
Joint List(s) of Non-Socialist Parties (Borgerlige Felleslister)	3
Local List(s) (Lokale lister)	6
Total number of members:	24

Sandtorg herredsstyre 1937–1941*
Party name (in Norwegian)	Number of representatives
Labour Party (Arbeiderpartiet)	11
Joint List(s) of Non-Socialist Parties (Borgerlige Felleslister)	12
Local List(s) (Lokale lister)	1
Total number of members:	24
Note: Due to the German occupation of Norway during World War II, no elections were held for new municipal councils until after the war ended in 1945.

=== Mayors ===
The mayor (Norwegian: ordfører) of Sandtorg Municipality was the political leader of the municipality and the chairperson of the municipal council. The following people have held this position:

- 1926–1934: P.C. Pedersen (V)
- 1934–1937: Alfons Johan Johansen (Ap)
- 1937–1941: Peder Nikolai Leier Jacobsen (Ap)
- 1941–1945: Erik Johan Bull (NS)
- 1945–1947: Peder Nikolai Leier Jacobsen (Ap)
- 1948–1963: Bjarne Berg-Sæther (Ap)

== See also ==
- List of former municipalities of Norway
