= Harstad Slough =

Lake in the state of Minnesota, United States

- Location within Minnesota Location within the United States
- Location: Stevens County, Minnesota
- Coordinates: 45°41′34″N 95°59′46″W
- Type: lake
- Basin countries: United States
- Surface elevation: 1,119 ft (341 m)

Harstad Slough is a lake in Stevens County, in the U.S. state of Minnesota.

Harstad Slough was named for Lars E. Harstad, a pioneer who settled near the lake.

== See also ==
- List of lakes in Minnesota
