= Bjarne Berg-Sæther =

Norwegian politician (1919–2009)

Bjarne Berg-Sæther (14 April 1919 – 5 August 2009) was a Norwegian politician for the Labour Party.

== Early life ==
He was born in Tjeldsund Municipality as the son of coastal pilot Berg Sæther (1876–1948) and wife Magna Toresen (1881–1952). He was educated in England from 1939 in languages and economics. In 1943 he married Gudrun Jackobsen (1907–1994) and they had one son, Tor Arne Berg-Sæther (1946–2006) and one daughter, Bente Ramsvik (1948-). After the war he was hired in the Ministry of Local Government and Labour, where he was in charge of integrating refugees from Finnmark from 1946 to 1952.

== Major awards ==
Berg-Sæther participated in the Second World War and he was given the following awards:

- Defence Medal 1940–1945 by King Haakon VII
- the city of Harstad's honor medal (1969)
- the Norwegian government's county honor medal by Prime Minister Gro Harlem Brundtland (1989)
- the King's Service Medal in Gold 2001 by King Harald V

== Political career ==
He chaired his Labour Party chapter from 1945 to 1952, and was first elected mayor of Sandtorg Municipality in 1947 and held this office until 1963, when the municipality was incorporated into Harstad Municipality. He then sat as mayor of Harstad Municipality from 1963 to 1967, and continued as a member of the municipal council until 1975. He was a member of the Troms county council from 1947 to 1963, and served as the county mayor of Troms from 1963 to 1967. He served as a deputy member of the Norwegian Parliament during the terms 1965-1969 and 1969–1973; in total he met for 347 working days in Parliament.

Bjarne Berg-Sæther chaired several public boards, including Vågsfjord Kraftselskap (1956–1975), the Evenes Airport building committee (1964–1967), Harstad Hospital (1969–1976), the public transportation company Harstad Oppland Rutebil (1964–1986), Fiskernes Bank and later Kreditkassen Bank in Harstad (1975–1986). He was a member of the National Postal Advisory Board (1978–1986) and vice chair of Niingen Kraftlag (1980–1990).

== Positions ==
He held the Office manager and CFO positions at Trondenes Kraftverk and Sør-Troms Elforsyning A/S power companies for 32 years (1954–1986).

He died on 5 August 2009.

Political offices
New office	County mayor of Troms; 1963–1967	Succeeded by Kåre Nordgård
