= Trondenes Municipality =

Former municipality in Troms, Norway

Trondenes Municipality Trondenes herred
- Former municipality
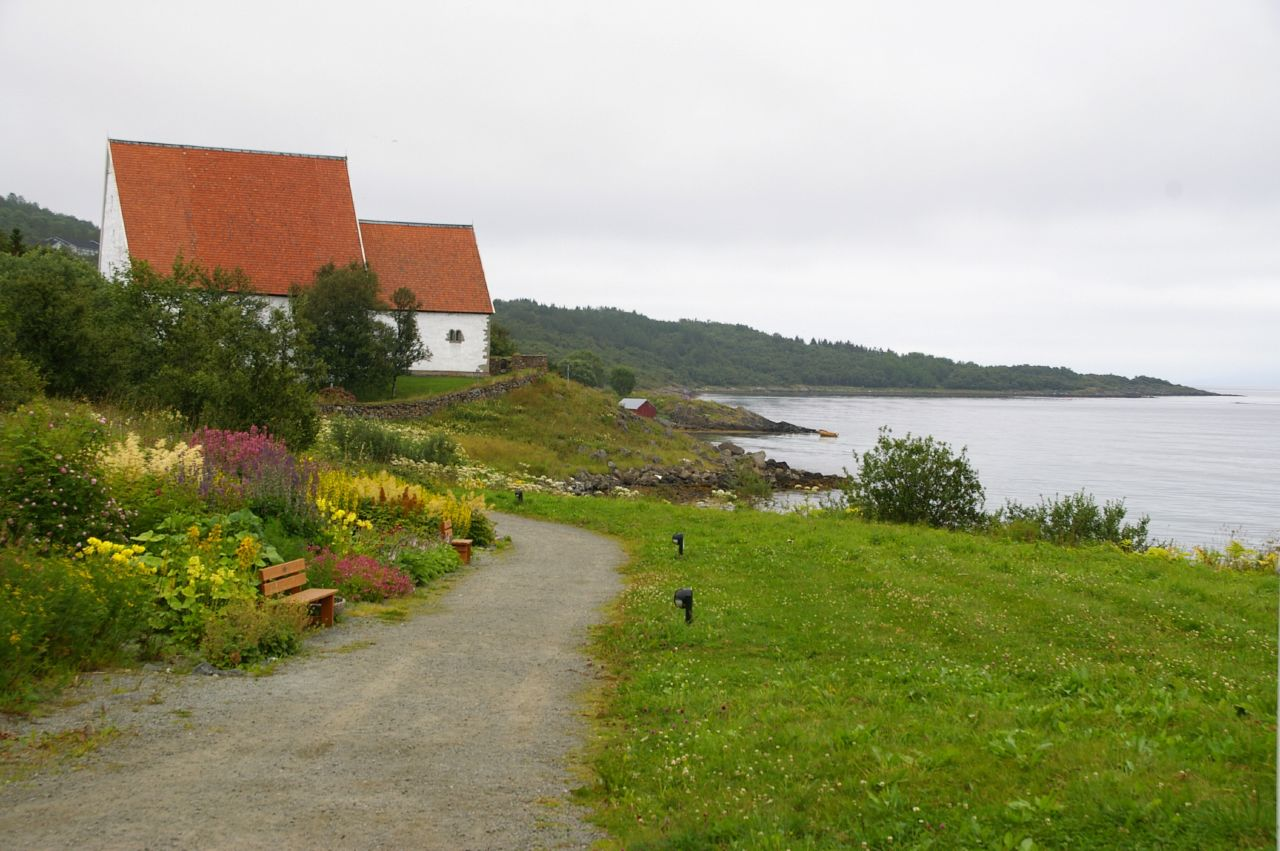
- Trondenes Church

- Troms within Norway

- Trondenes within Troms
- Coordinates: 68°49′18″N 16°33′48″E
- Country: Norway
- County: Troms
- District: Central Hålogaland
- Established: 1 Jan 1838
  - Created as: Formannskapsdistrikt
- Disestablished: 1 Jan 1964
  - Succeeded by: Harstad Municipality
- Administrative centre: Trondenes

Area (upon dissolution)
  - Total: 186.3 km^{2} (71.9 sq mi)
  - Rank: #388 in Norway
- Highest elevation: 987 m (3,238 ft)

Population (1963)
  - Total: 6,423
  - Rank: #128 in Norway
  - Density: 34.5/km^{2} (89/sq mi)
  - Change (10 years): ▲ +37.3%
- Demonym(s): Trondenesværing; Tronesværing

Official language
  - Norwegian form: Neutral
- Time zone: UTC+01:00 (CET)
  - Summer (DST): UTC+02:00 (CEST)
- ISO 3166 code: NO-1914

Trondenes is a former municipality in Troms county, Norway. The 186.3-square-kilometre (71.9 sq mi) municipality existed from 1838 until its dissolution in 1964. It was located along the western shore of the Vågsfjorden in what is now Harstad Municipality. Trondenes included the southern part of the island of Grytøya and part of the eastern coast of the island of Hinnøya as well as some smaller islands. Located just north of the town of Harstad, the village of Trondenes was the administrative centre of the municipality. That village is also the site of the historic Trondenes Church, the northernmost medieval stone church in Norway and the seat of the historic Trondenes parish. The Trondenes Historical Center was built in 1997 near the church to teach about the history of the area. Trondenes Fort is also located on the Trondenes peninsula.

Prior to its dissolution in 1964, the 186.3-square-kilometre (71.9 sq mi) municipality was the 388th largest by area out of the 689 municipalities in Norway. Trondenes Municipality was the 128th most populous municipality in Norway with a population of about 6,423. The municipality's population density was 34.5 inhabitants per square kilometre (89/sq mi) and its population had increased by 37.3% over the previous 10-year period.

== General information ==
The parish of Trondenes was established as a municipality on 1 January 1838 (see formannskapsdistrikt law). The village of Harstad (population: 1,246) was declared a ladested and was therefore separated from Trondenes Municipality on 1 January 1904 to become a separate municipality. This left Trondenes with 7,775 inhabitants. On 1 January 1912, a part of southern Trondenes Municipality (population: 291) was transferred to the neighboring Evenes Municipality (located in Nordland county).

On 1 July 1926, the large Trondenes Municipality was divided into three separate municipalities. The areas east of the Tjeldsundet strait and east of the Vågsfjorden (population: 2,443) became Skånland Municipality and the areas on the west side of the Tjeldsundet and Vågsfjorden were split two ways. The southern part (population: 4,224) became Sandtorg Municipality and the northern part (population: 3,429) remained as Trondenes Municipality. On 25 October 1956, a small border adjustment was made between Trondenes Municipality and the neighboring Kvæfjord Municipality. This resulted in 32 inhabitants becoming residents of Trondenes Municipality.

During the 1960s, there were many municipal mergers across Norway due to the work of the Schei Committee. On 1 January 1964, Trondenes Municipality (population: 6,567), Sandtorg Municipality (population: 7,512), the town of Harstad (population: 3,808) were merged to form a new, larger Harstad Municipality.

=== Name ===
The municipality (originally the parish) is named after the old Trondenes farm (Old Norse: Þróndarnes) since the historic Trondenes Church was built there. The first element is the genitive case of the word þróndr which means "hog", referring to the shape of a nearby mountain. The last element is nes which means "headland". The shape of the headland has been compared with that of the snout of a hog.

=== Churches ===
The Church of Norway had one parish (sokn) within Trondenes Municipality. At the time of the municipal dissolution, it was part of the Trondenes prosti (deanery) in the Diocese of Nord-Hålogaland.

Churches in Trondenes Municipality
| Parish (sokn) | Church name | Location of the church | Year built |
|---|---|---|---|
| Trondenes | Trondenes Church | Trondenes | c. 1400 |

== Geography ==
The highest point in the municipality is the 987-metre (3,238 ft) tall mountain Skjellesvikgalten on the island of Grytøya.

== Government ==
While it existed, Trondenes Municipality was responsible for primary education (through 10th grade), outpatient health services, senior citizen services, welfare and other social services, zoning, economic development, and municipal roads and utilities. The municipality was governed by a municipal council of directly elected representatives. The mayor was indirectly elected by a vote of the municipal council. The municipality was under the jurisdiction of the Hålogaland Court of Appeal.

=== Municipal council ===
The municipal council (Herredsstyre) of Trondenes Municipality was made up of 29 representatives that were elected to four year terms. The tables below show the historical composition of the council by political party.

Trondenes herredsstyre 1959–1963
| Party name (in Norwegian) | Number of representatives |
|---|---|
| Labour Party (Arbeiderpartiet) | 14 |
| Conservative Party (Høyre) | 6 |
| Centre Party (Senterpartiet) | 3 |
| Liberal Party (Venstre) | 1 |
| List of workers, fishermen, and small farmholders (Arbeidere, fiskere, småbrukere liste) | 1 |
| Joint List(s) of Non-Socialist Parties (Borgerlige Felleslister) | 2 |
| Local List(s) (Lokale lister) | 2 |
| Total number of members: | 29 |
Note: On 1 January 1964, Trondenes Municipality became part of Harstad Municipality.

Trondenes herredsstyre 1955–1959
| Party name (in Norwegian) | Number of representatives |
|---|---|
| Labour Party (Arbeiderpartiet) | 13 |
| Communist Party (Kommunistiske Parti) | 1 |
| Local List(s) (Lokale lister) | 15 |
| Total number of members: | 29 |

Trondenes herredsstyre 1951–1955
| Party name (in Norwegian) | Number of representatives |
|---|---|
| Labour Party (Arbeiderpartiet) | 7 |
| Communist Party (Kommunistiske Parti) | 1 |
| Liberal Party (Venstre) | 1 |
| Local List(s) (Lokale lister) | 11 |
| Total number of members: | 20 |

Trondenes herredsstyre 1947–1951
| Party name (in Norwegian) | Number of representatives |
|---|---|
| Labour Party (Arbeiderpartiet) | 6 |
| Communist Party (Kommunistiske Parti) | 2 |
| Joint List(s) of Non-Socialist Parties (Borgerlige Felleslister) | 5 |
| Local List(s) (Lokale lister) | 7 |
| Total number of members: | 20 |

Trondenes herredsstyre 1945–1947
| Party name (in Norwegian) | Number of representatives |
|---|---|
| Labour Party (Arbeiderpartiet) | 3 |
| Communist Party (Kommunistiske Parti) | 3 |
| Local List(s) (Lokale lister) | 14 |
| Total number of members: | 20 |

Trondenes herredsstyre 1937–1941*
| Party name (in Norwegian) | Number of representatives |
|---|---|
| Labour Party (Arbeiderpartiet) | 6 |
| Local List(s) (Lokale lister) | 14 |
| Total number of members: | 20 |
Note: Due to the German occupation of Norway during World War II, no elections were held for new municipal councils until after the war ended in 1945.

=== Mayors ===
The mayor (Norwegian: ordfører) of Trondenes Municipality was the political leader of the municipality and the chairperson of the municipal council. The following people have held this position:

- 1838–1840: Nicolai Norman
- 1840–1844: Johan Conrad Müller
- 1844–1845: Anders Qvale
- 1845–1848: John Johansen Vold
- 1848–1853: Ove Guldberg Høegh
- 1853–1862: Anders Vincent Stoltenberg
- 1863–1866: Johan J. Kildal
- 1867–1870: Lars Mikal Hansen (V)
- 1871–1874: Bernt L. Haugan
- 1875–1882: Lars Mikal Hansen (V)
- 1882–1901: Rikard Kaarbø
- 1901–1913: Karl Andreas Hanssen
- 1913–1922: Hans Marenius Mikelborg (Ap)
- 1923–1925: Peder C. Pedersen (V)
- 1926–1931: Kristian Holst (FV)
- 1932–1941: Johan Heide (V)
- 1942–1944: Hartløv Aune (NS)
- 1944–1945: Edvard Ruud (NS)
- 1945–1945: Johan Heide (V)
- 1946–1947: Fridtjof Dahl
- 1949–1955: Nils Wulff
- 1956–1963: Freder Frederiksen (Ap)

== Media gallery ==
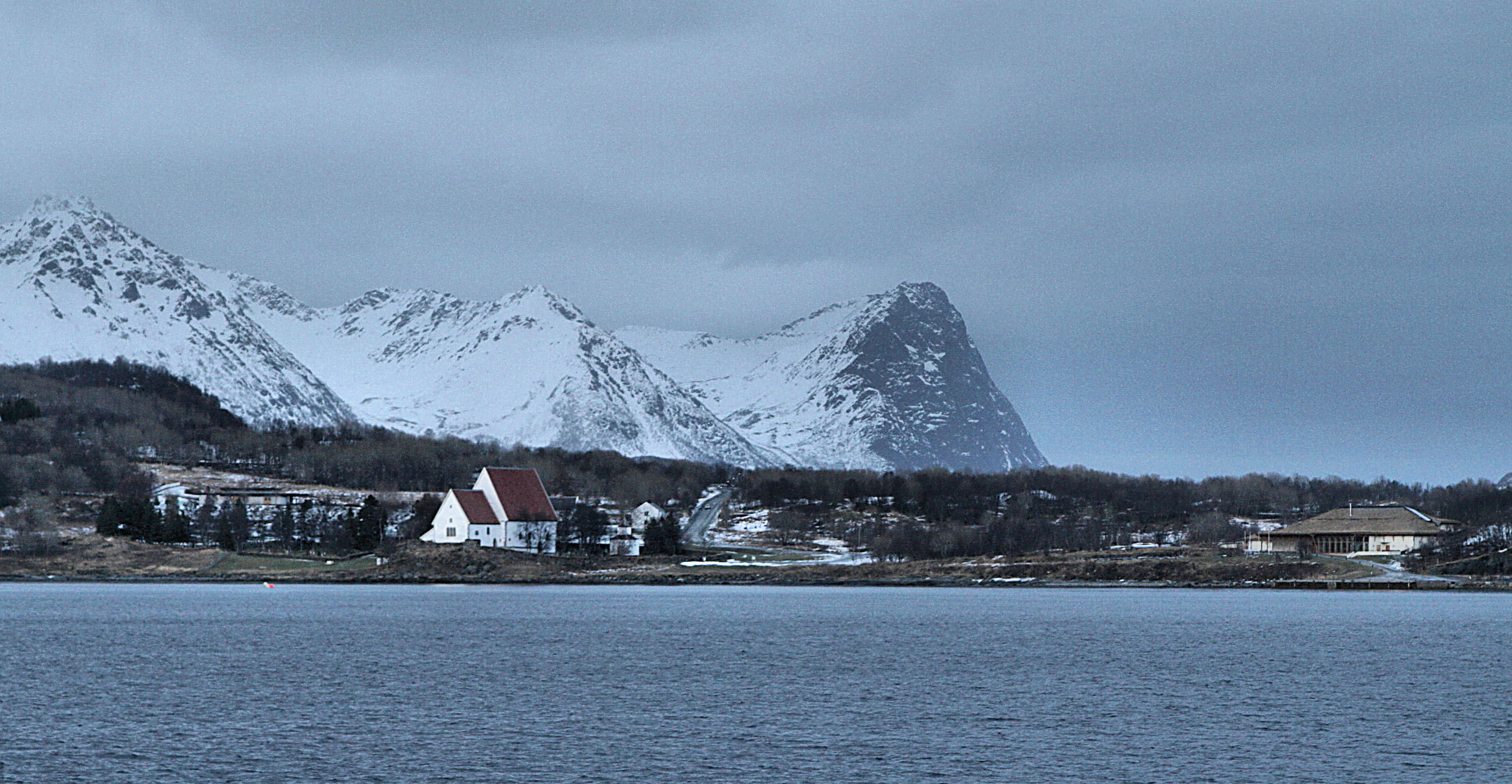

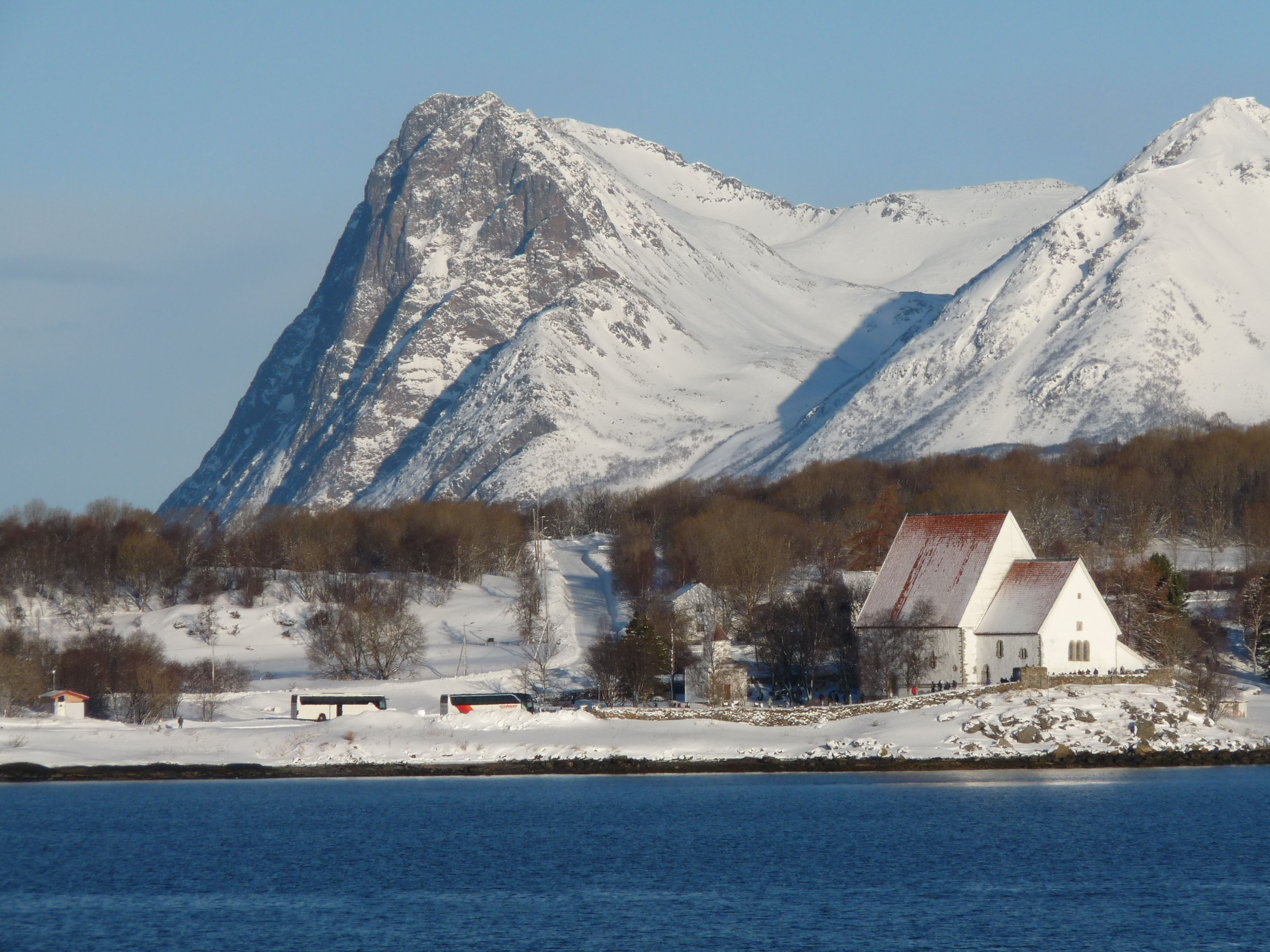

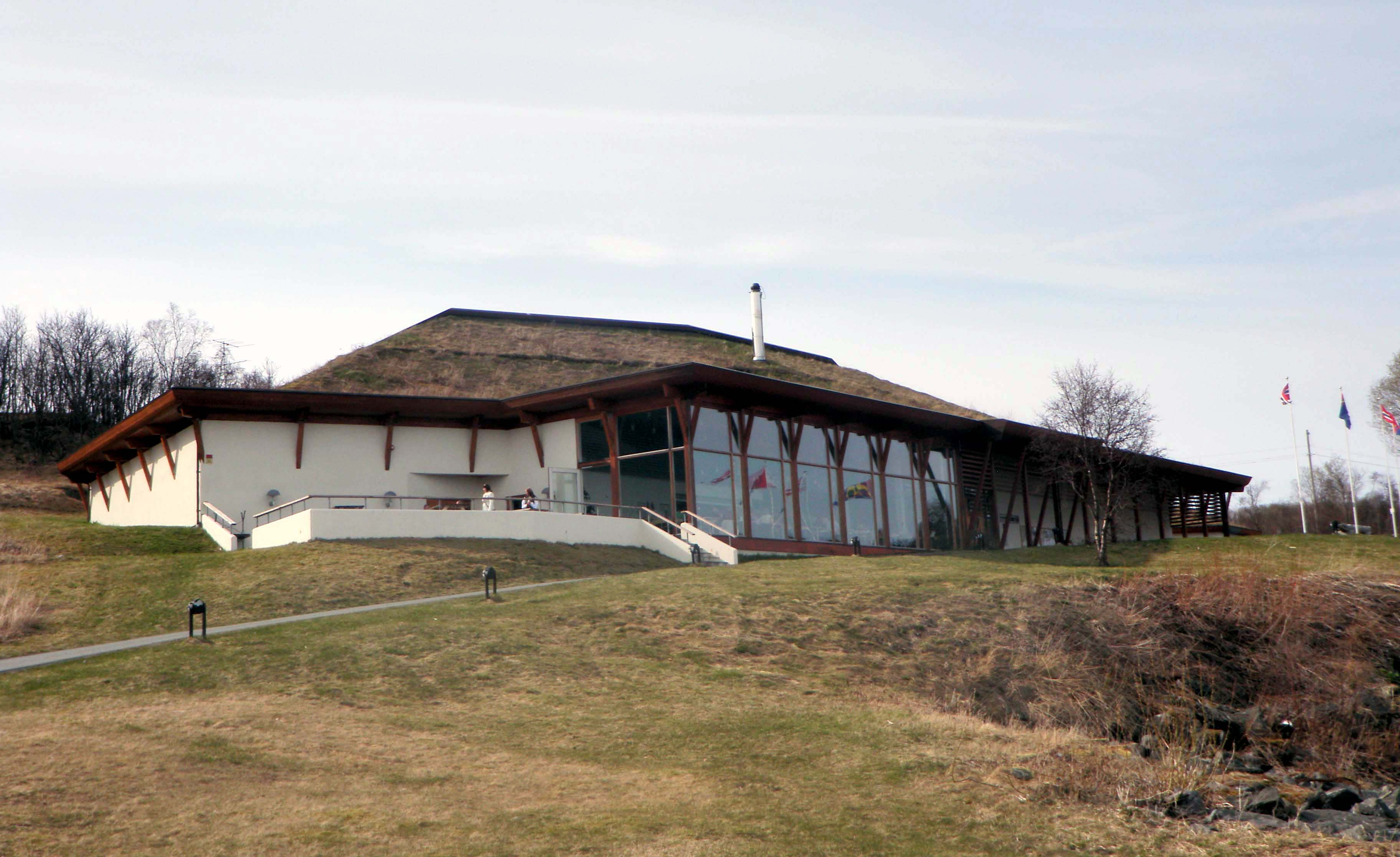

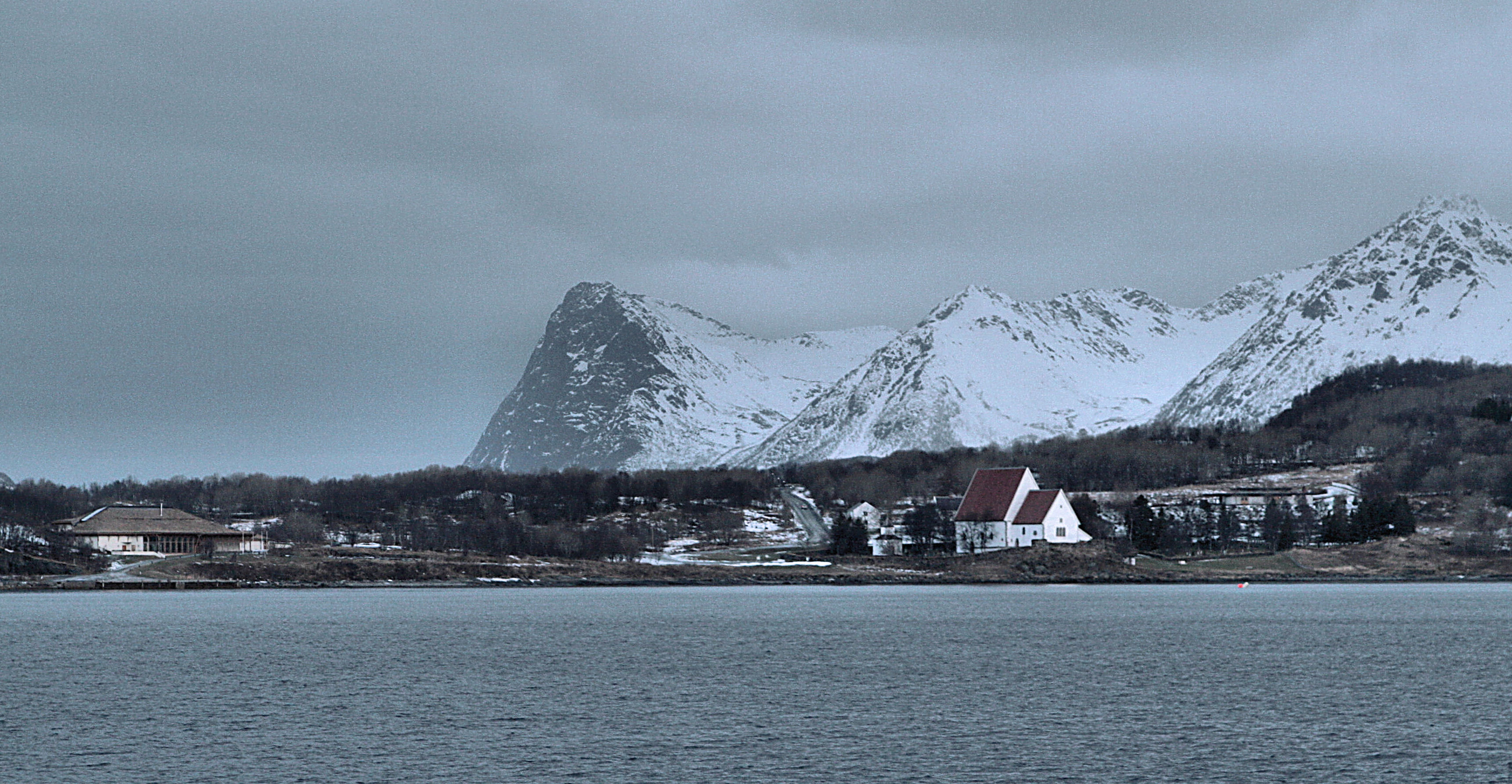

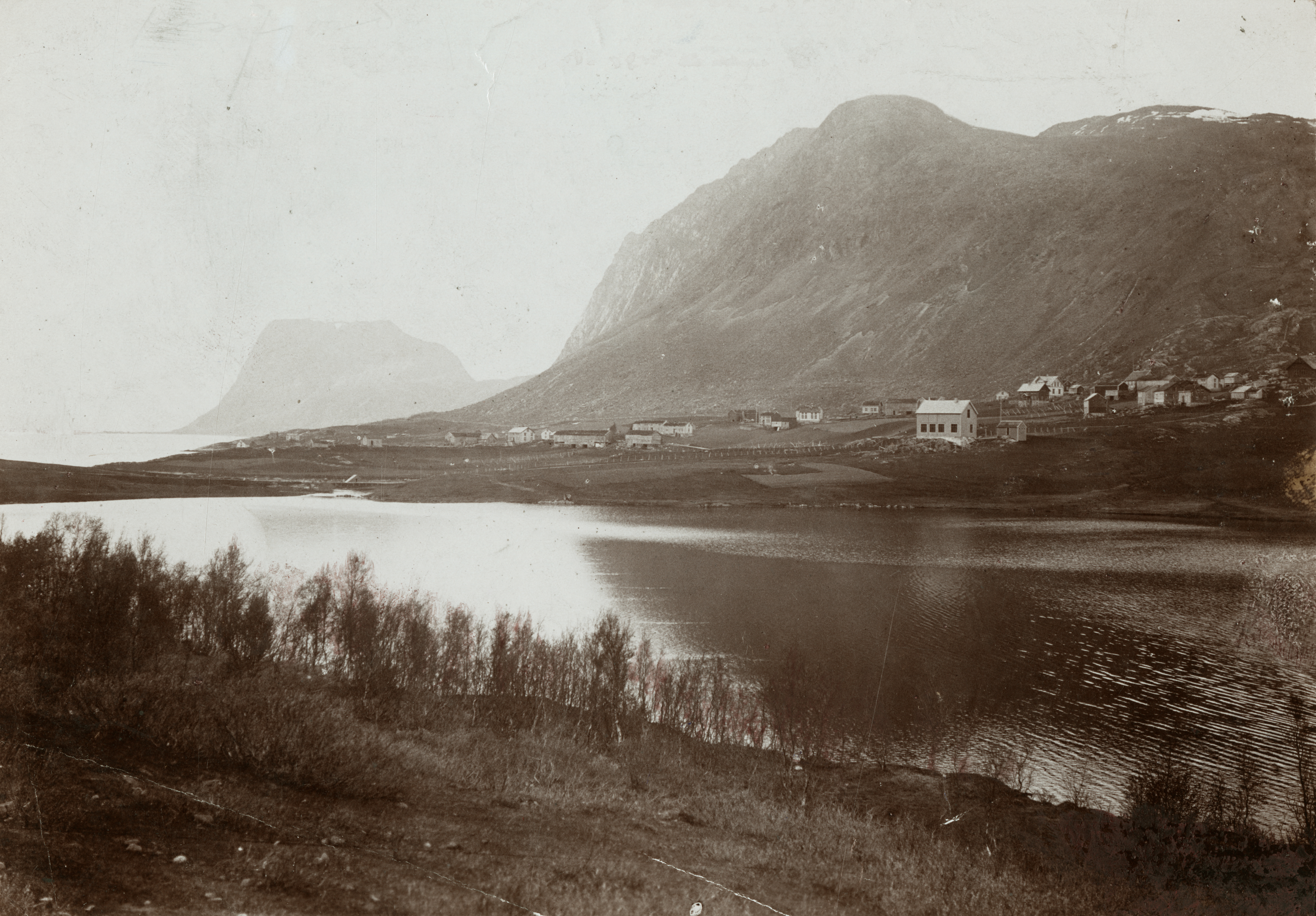

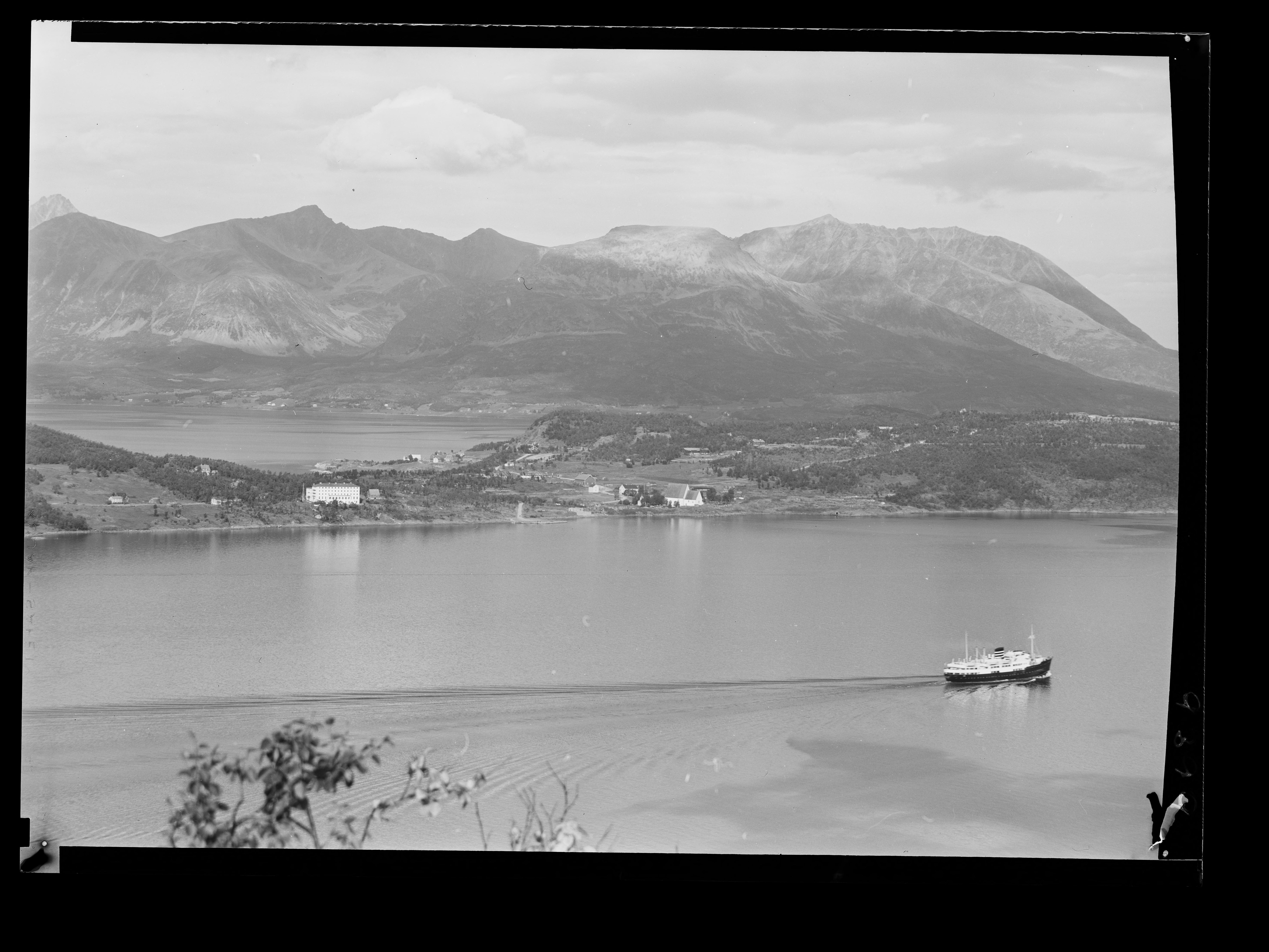

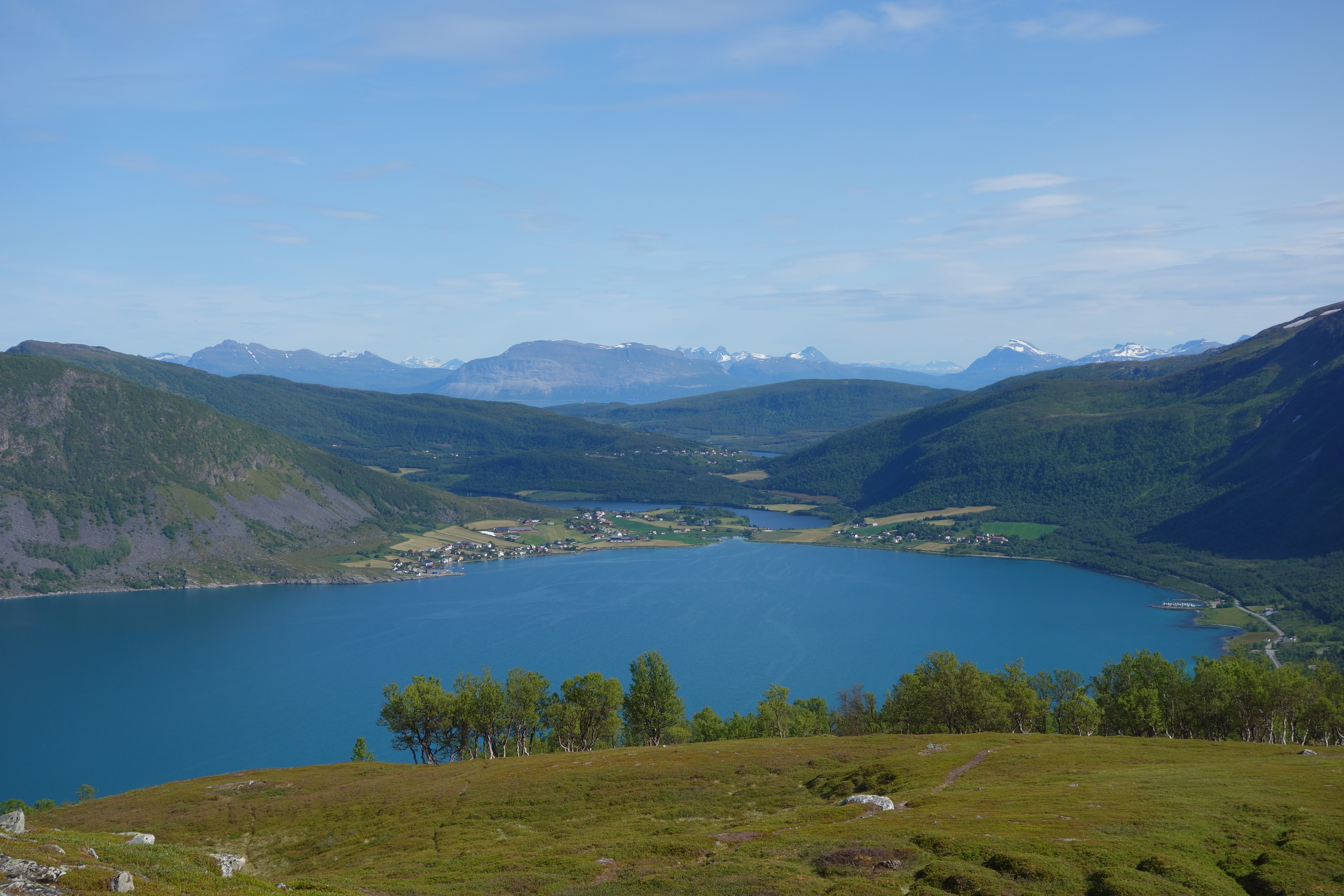

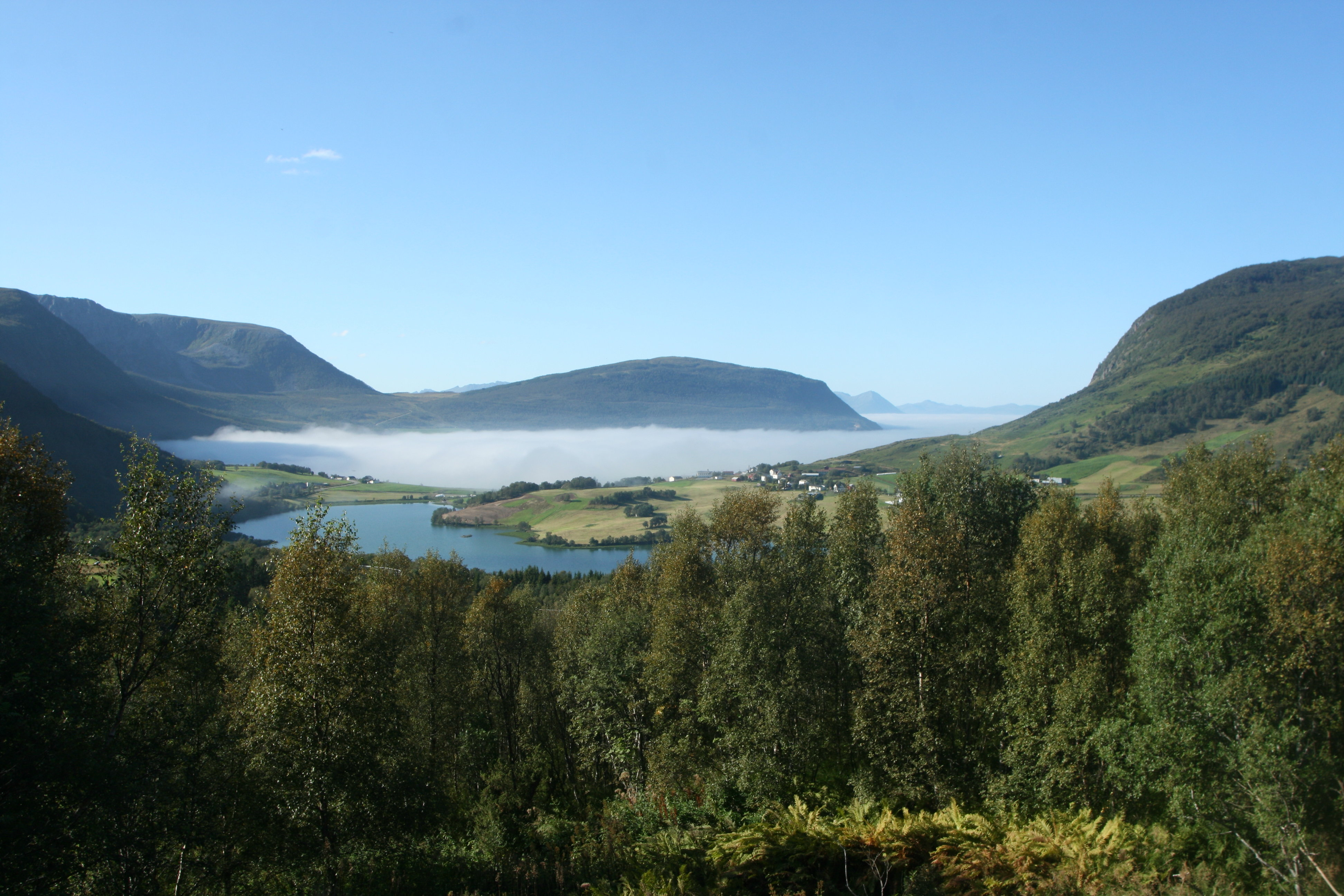

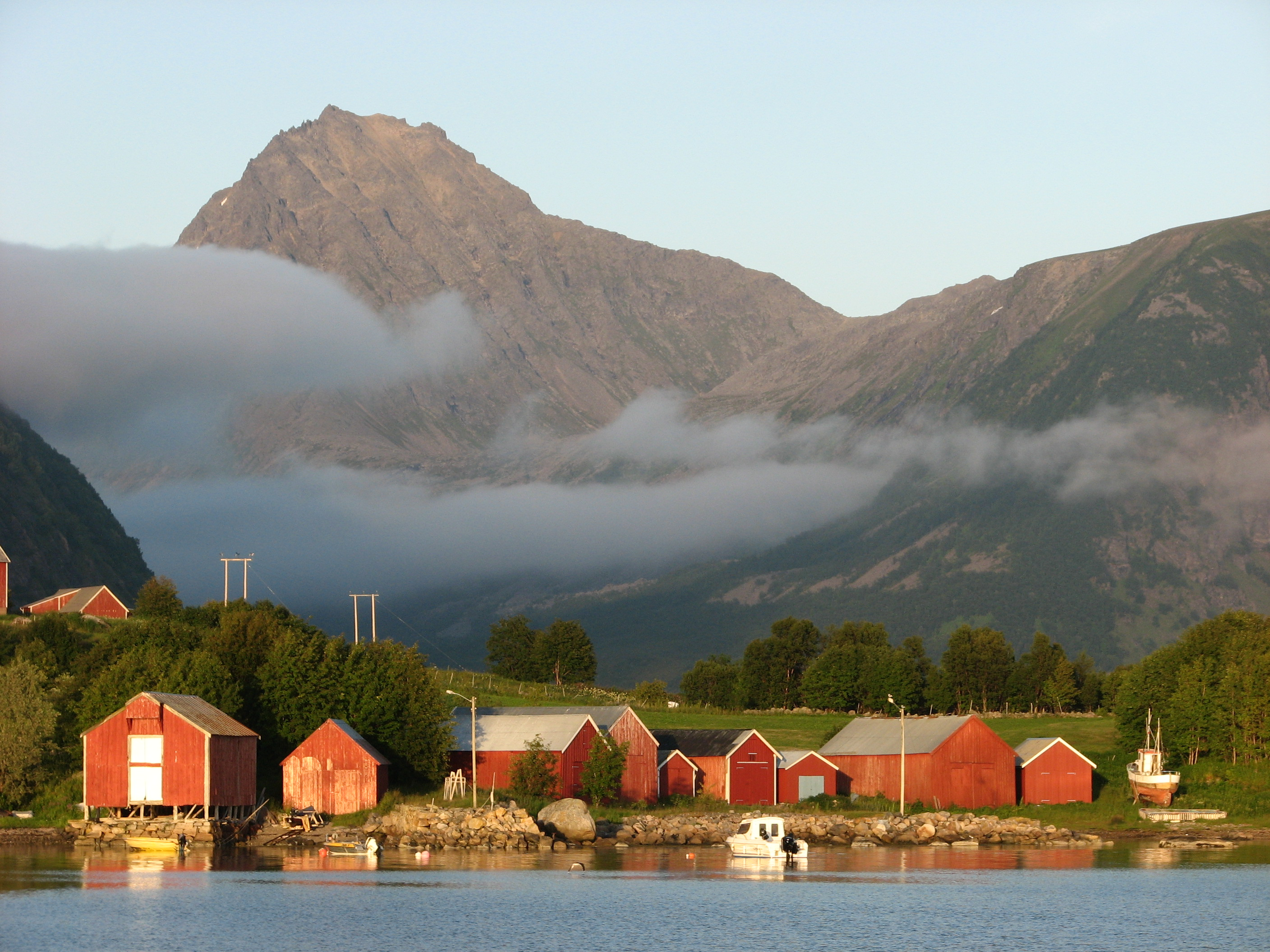

== See also ==
- List of former municipalities of Norway
