= Harstad Camping =

Municipal campgrounds

Coordinates: 68.773°N 16.578°E

Harstad Camping was until 2023 a campgrounds in the municipality of Harstad in Troms county, Norway. It was located just east of Kanebogen on the Steinbergneset peninsula, about 5 km (3.1 mi) south of the city of Harstad, along the Vågsfjorden.
