= Harstad (town) =

City in Harstad Municipality, Norway

Harstad: Harstad (Norwegian); Hárstták (Northern Sami)
- Town/City (Note: In the Norwegian language, the word by can be translated as "town" or "city".)
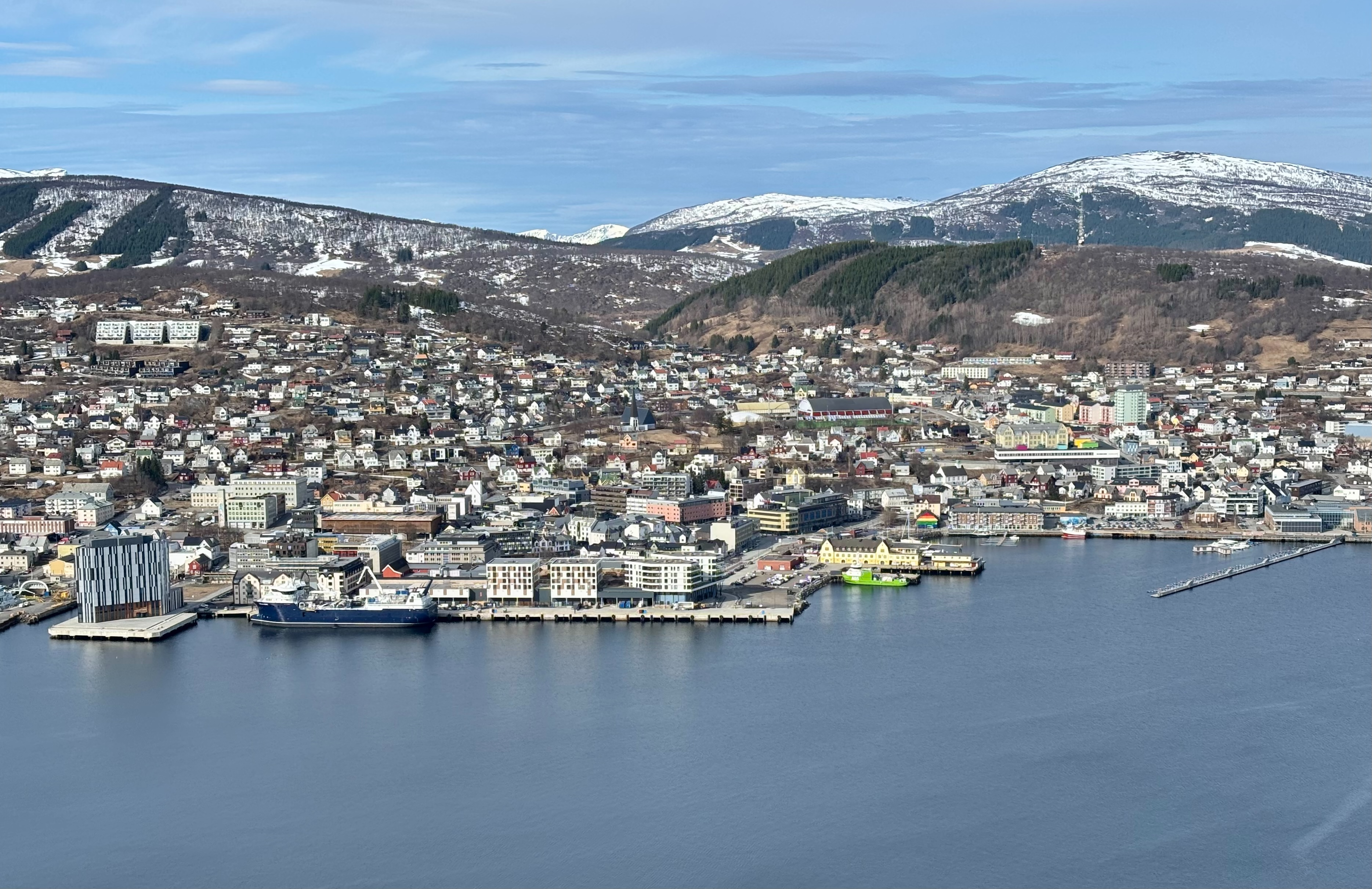
- Interactive map of Harstad
- Location within Troms Location within Norway
- Coordinates: 68.80112°N 16.54414°E
- Country: Norway
- Region: Northern Norway
- County: Troms
- District: Central Hålogaland
- Municipality: Harstad Municipality
- Established as
- Town (By): 1904

Area
  - Total: 11.45 km^{2} (4.42 sq mi)
- Elevation: 3 m (9.8 ft)

Population (2023)
  - Total: 21,289
  - Density: 1,858/km^{2} (4,810/sq mi)
- Time zone: UTC+01:00 (CET)
  - Summer (DST): UTC+02:00 (CEST)
- Post Code: 9405 Harstad
- Former municipality
- Harstad ladested
- Troms within Norway

- Harstad within Troms
- Country: Norway
- County: Troms
- District: Central Hålogaland
- Established: 1904
  - Preceded by: Trondenes Municipality
- Disestablished: 1 Jan 1964
  - Succeeded by: Harstad Municipality
- Administrative centre: Harstad

Area (upon dissolution)
  - Total: 0.7 km^{2} (0.27 sq mi)
  - Rank: #679 in Norway

Population (1963)
  - Total: 3,860
  - Rank: #231 in Norway
  - Density: 5,514/km^{2} (14,280/sq mi)
  - Change (10 years): ▼ −8.4%
- Time zone: UTC+01:00 (CET)
  - Summer (DST): UTC+02:00 (CEST)
- ISO 3166 code: NO-1901

Harstad (Norwegian: [hɑ̂ʂtɑ]; Northern Sami: Hárstták) is a city in Troms county, Norway and the administrative centre of Harstad Municipality. The 11.46-square-kilometre (2,830-acre) city has a population (2023) of 21,289 (31,404 in the Urban area) and a population density of 1,858 inhabitants per square kilometre (4,810/sq mi). It is the second-largest town in Troms county, after the city of Tromsø, and it is the largest town in Central Hålogaland.

The town is located on the northeastern part of the large island of Hinnøya, along the Vågsfjorden. The city is made up of several areas (bydeler) including Gansås, Grønnebakkan, Kanebogen, Medkila, Sama, Seljestad, Kilhus, Stangnes, and Trondenes and more. There are two churches of the Church of Norway in the town: Harstad Church and Kanebogen Church. The historic Trondenes Church lies on the north edge of the town, near the Trondenes Fort.

== History ==
On 1 January 1904, the village of Harstad was granted town privileges as a ladested. On the same date, the new town was separated from the Trondenes Municipality to become a separate town-municipality of its own. Initially, the town of Harstad had 1,246 residents. The town of Harstad existed as its own municipality between 1 January 1904 until 31 December 1963.

During the 1960s, there were many municipal mergers across Norway due to the work of the Schei Committee. On 1 January 1964, the town of Harstad (population: 3,808) was merged with Trondenes Municipality (population: 6,567) to the north and Sandtorg Municipality (population: 7,512) to the south, forming a new, much larger Harstad Municipality.

=== Name ===
The town (and municipality) is named after the old Harstad farm (Old Norse: Harðarstaðir), since the town is built where the farm once was located. The first element is (probably) the genitive case of the male name Hǫrðr. The last element is staðir which means "homestead" or "farm". On 6 February 2017, the municipality of Harstad adopted a co-equal Sami language name for the municipality: Hárstták. The Sami language name spelling changes depending on how it is used. It is called Hárstták when it is spelled alone, but it is Hársttáid suohkan when using the Sami language equivalent to "Harstad municipality".

== Government ==
The city of Harstad is part of Harstad Municipality. The urban city area itself is not self-governing, but rather the mayor and municipal council for the whole municipality oversees the city and entire municipality. From 1904 until 1963, the city and the municipality were coterminous, but since 1964, the municipality has been much more than just the city.

== Transport ==
Harstad is served by Harstad/Narvik Airport which is located 44 kilometres (27 mi) south of Harstad and has regular flights to Oslo, Trondheim, Bodø, Tromsø and Andenes.

== Climate ==
Climate data for Harstad stadion 1991-2020 (45 m, avg high/low 2007-2025, extremes 2002–2025)
Month	Jan	Feb	Mar	Apr	May	Jun	Jul	Aug	Sep	Oct	Nov	Dec	Year
Record high °C (°F)	8.8 (47.8)	9.2 (48.6)	10.9 (51.6)	16.9 (62.4)	24.7 (76.5)	29.6 (85.3)	31.7 (89.1)	31.5 (88.7)	25.9 (78.6)	17.5 (63.5)	13.8 (56.8)	9.8 (49.6)	31.7 (89.1)
Mean daily maximum °C (°F)	0.2 (32.4)	0.5 (32.9)	2.3 (36.1)	5.5 (41.9)	10.5 (50.9)	14.2 (57.6)	17.6 (63.7)	16.4 (61.5)	12.7 (54.9)	7.1 (44.8)	3.6 (38.5)	1.6 (34.9)	7.7 (45.8)
Daily mean °C (°F)	−1.8 (28.8)	−2.2 (28.0)	−0.7 (30.7)	2.4 (36.3)	6.6 (43.9)	9.9 (49.8)	13.2 (55.8)	12.4 (54.3)	8.9 (48.0)	4.3 (39.7)	1.4 (34.5)	−0.5 (31.1)	4.5 (40.1)
Mean daily minimum °C (°F)	−4.5 (23.9)	−4.3 (24.3)	−3.1 (26.4)	−0.4 (31.3)	3.9 (39.0)	7.7 (45.9)	10.6 (51.1)	10.1 (50.2)	7 (45)	2.6 (36.7)	−0.7 (30.7)	−2.9 (26.8)	2.2 (35.9)
Record low °C (°F)	−15.4 (4.3)	−16.1 (3.0)	−13.3 (8.1)	−9.4 (15.1)	−3.7 (25.3)	−0.6 (30.9)	4.6 (40.3)	1.7 (35.1)	−1.6 (29.1)	−7.9 (17.8)	−10.3 (13.5)	−14.5 (5.9)	−16.1 (3.0)
Average precipitation mm (inches)	129 (5.1)	95 (3.7)	100 (3.9)	53 (2.1)	44 (1.7)	39 (1.5)	55 (2.2)	58 (2.3)	77 (3.0)	94 (3.7)	78 (3.1)	90 (3.5)	912 (35.8)
Source 1: Seklima
Source 2:

== Notable persons ==
=== Miss International ===
Anne Lena Hansen, Miss International 1995

== Media gallery ==
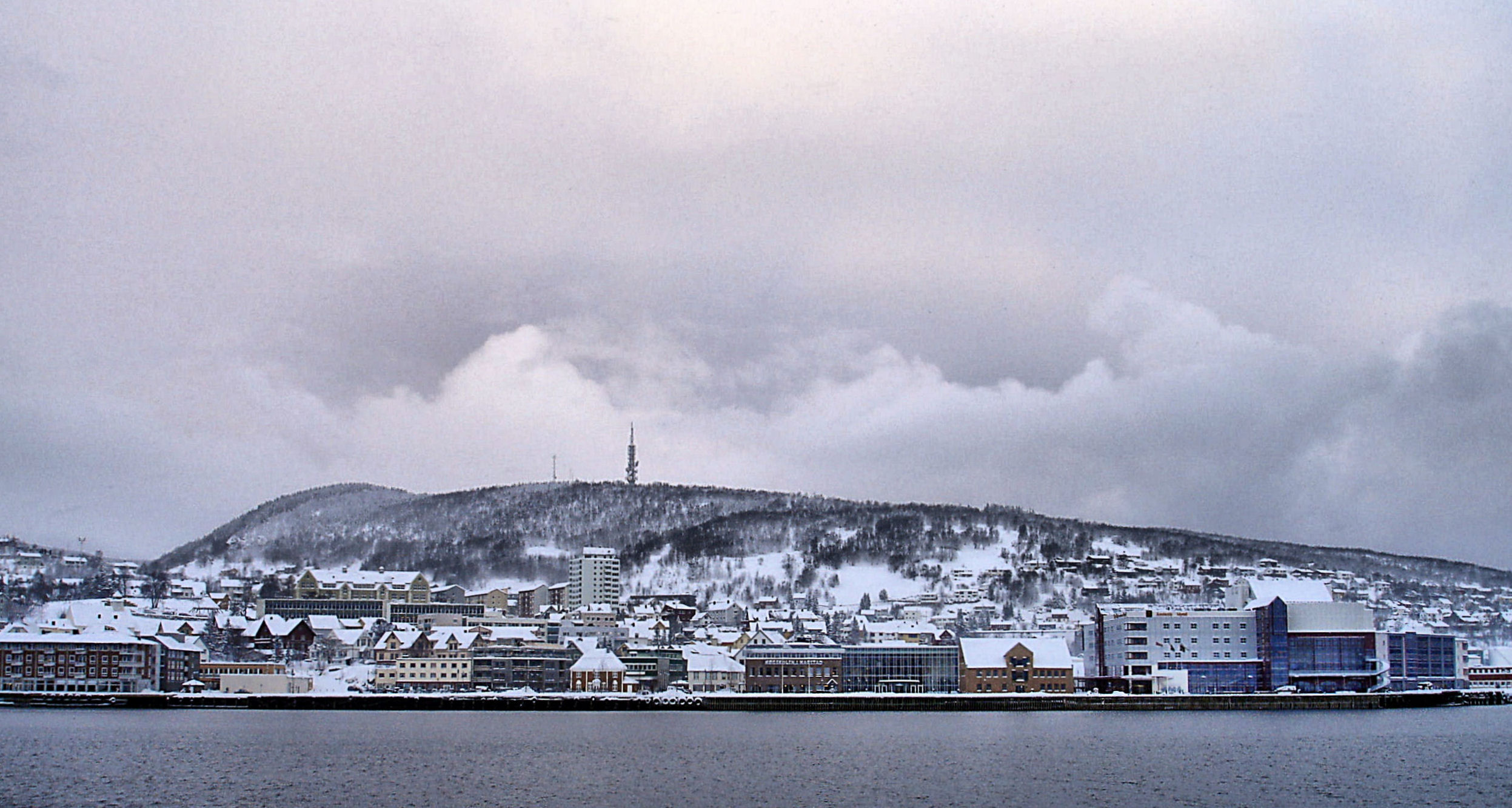
Northern part of town

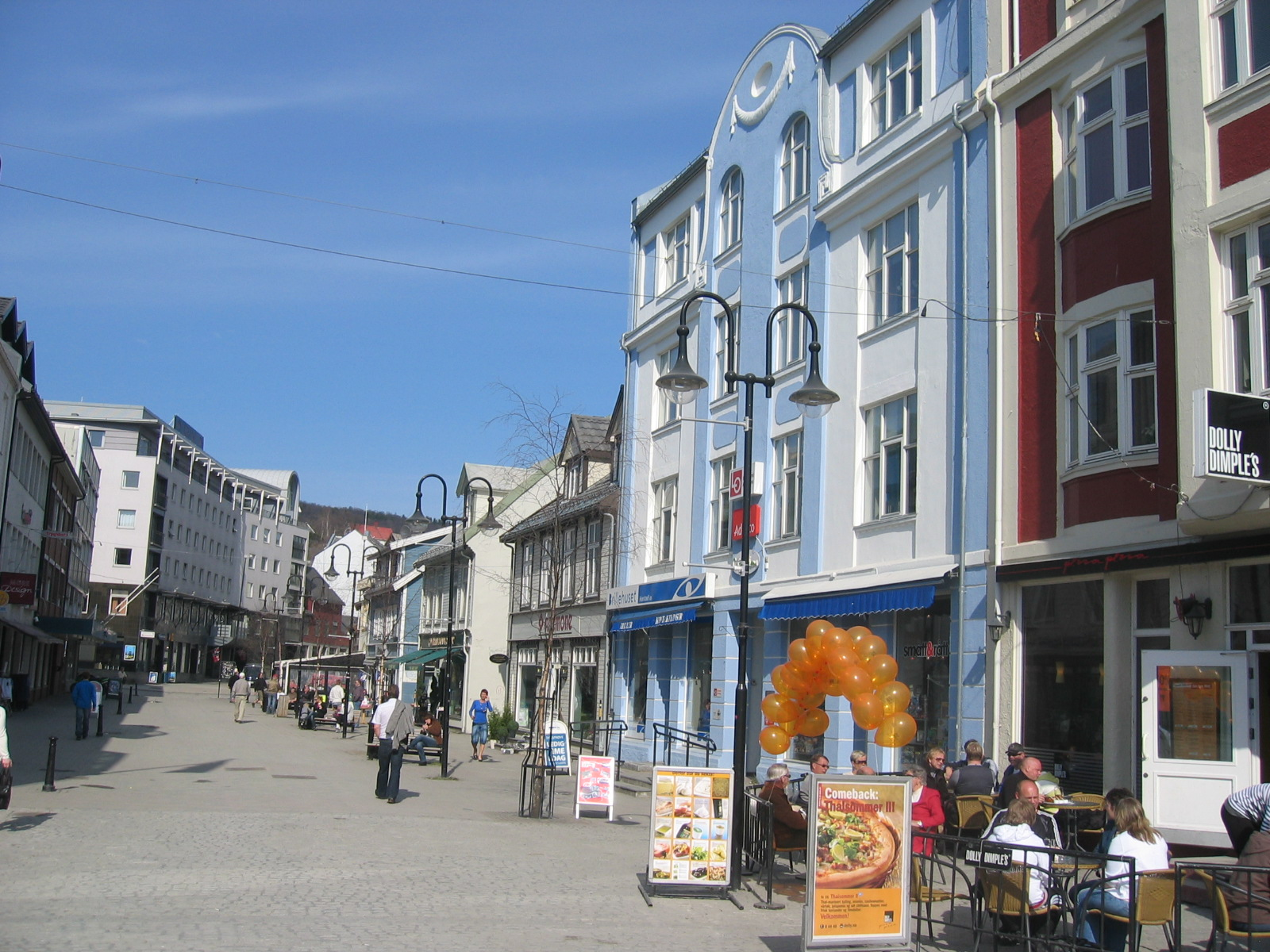
Town centre

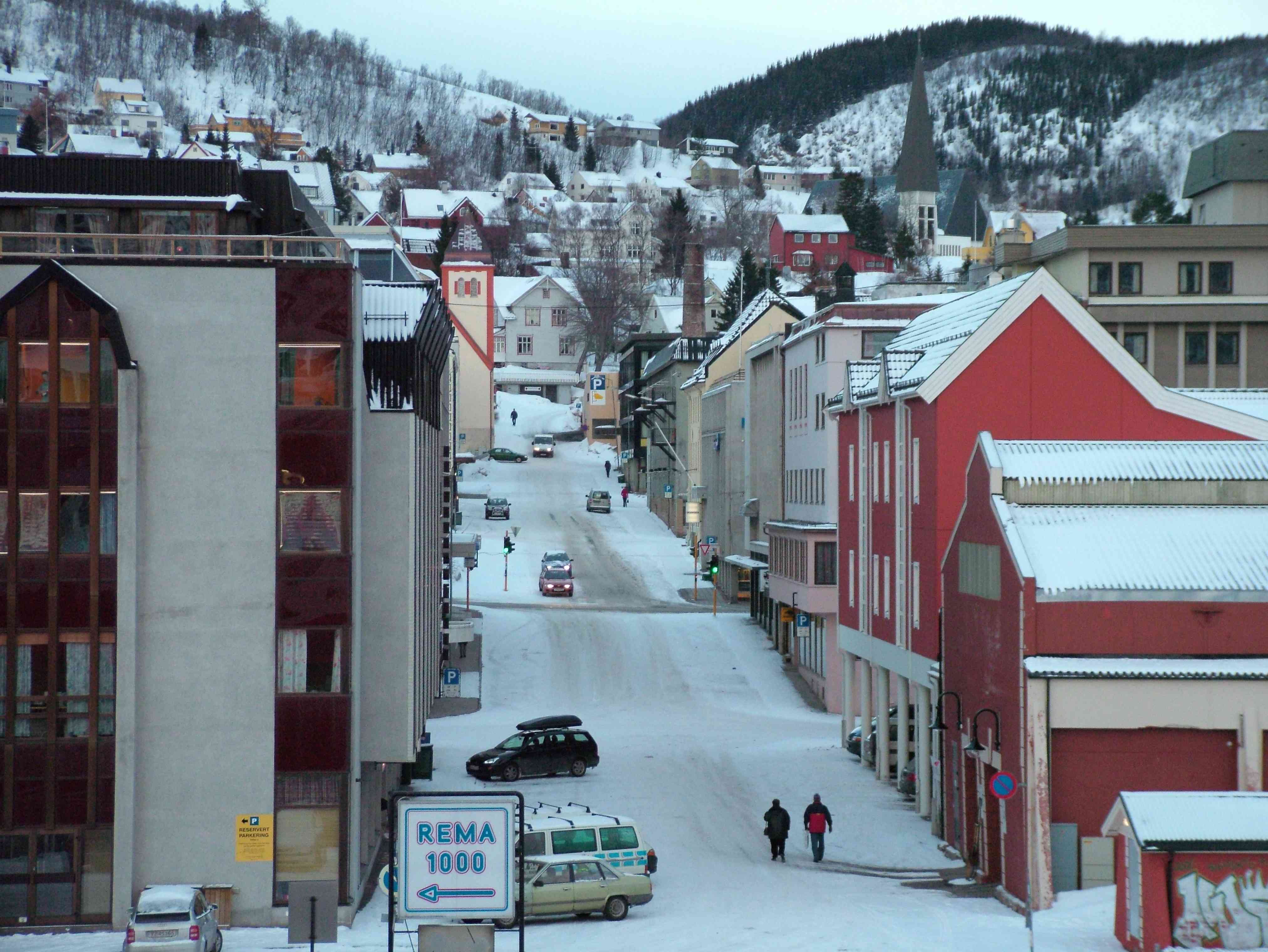
Harstad in winter

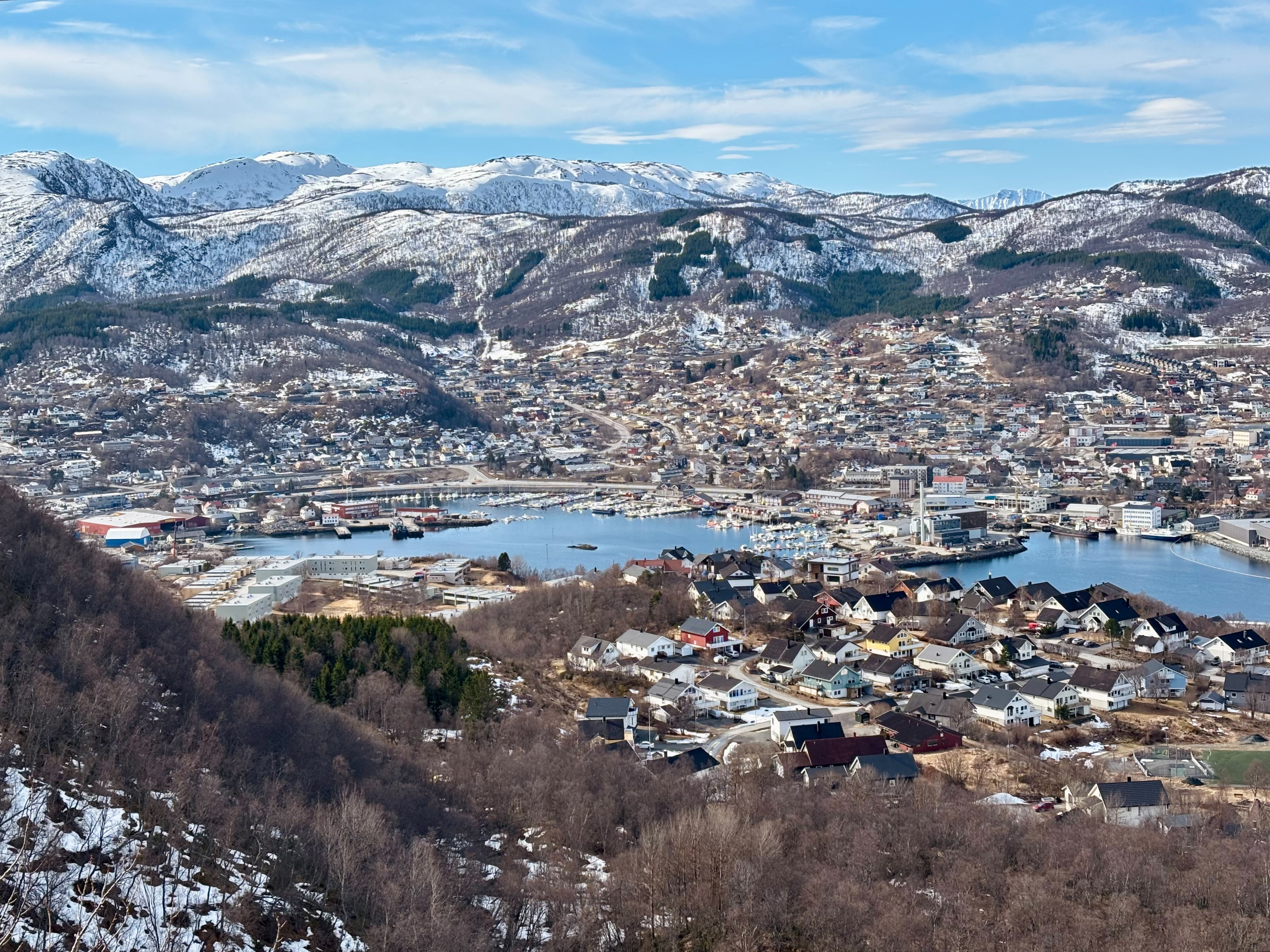
View from Gangsåstoppen

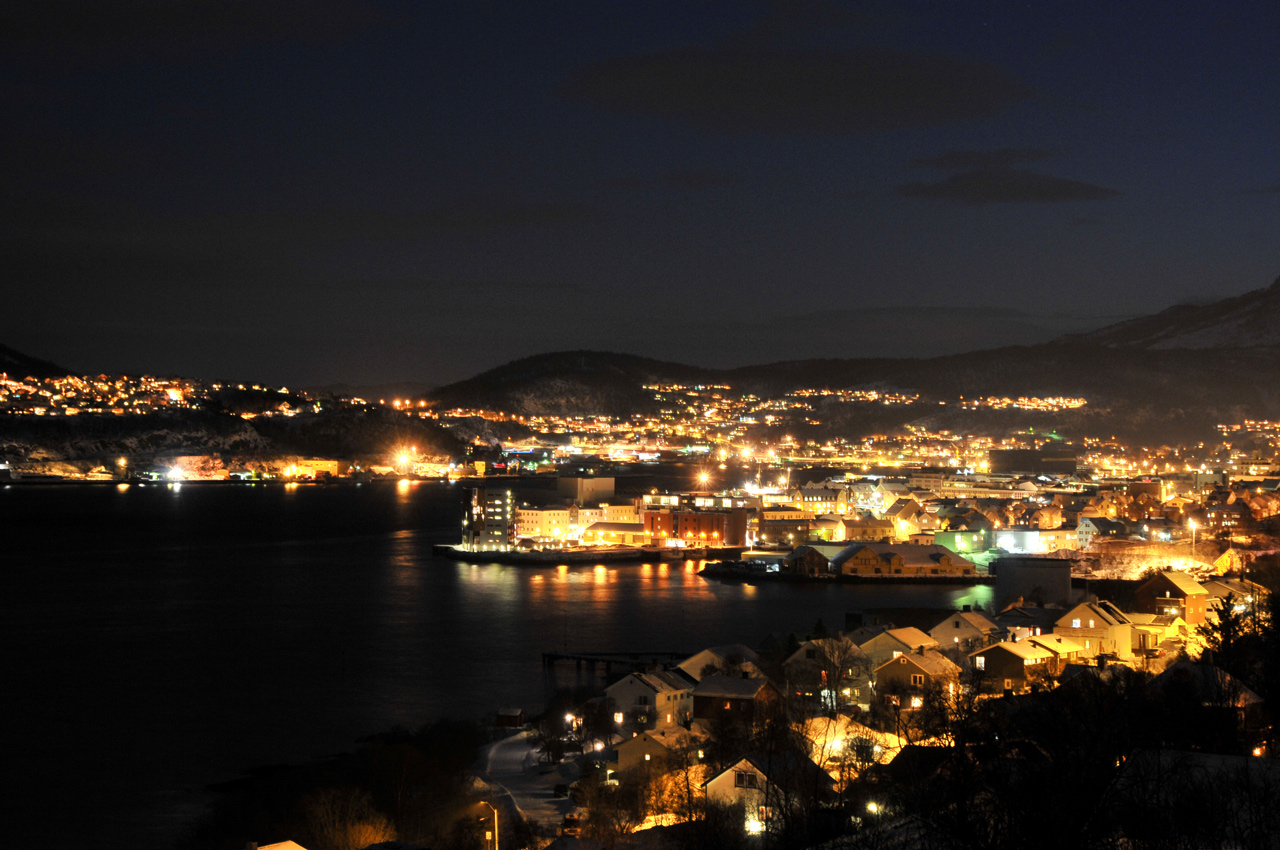
Nocturnal view

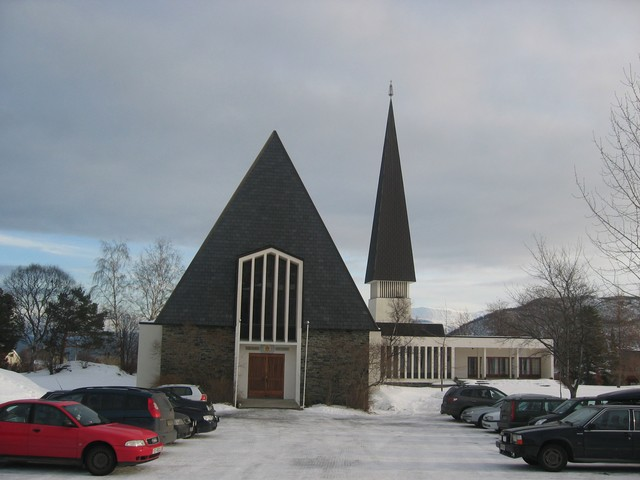
Harstad Church
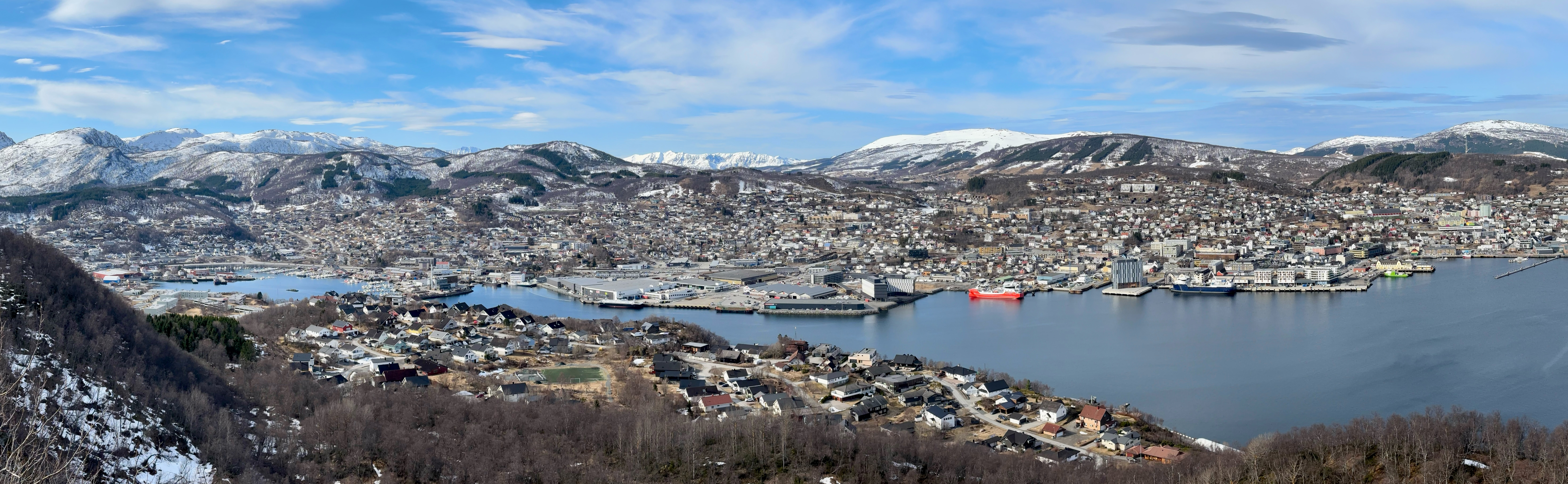
View of the city from Gangsåstoppen

== See also ==
- List of towns and cities in Norway
