= HMS Carysfort (R25) =

C-class destroyer

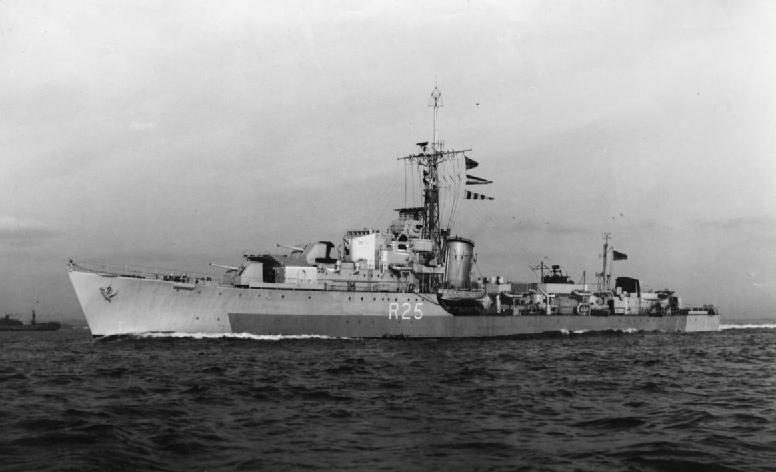

History

United Kingdom
- Name: HMS Carysfort
- Builder: J. Samuel White & Co, Cowes
- Laid down: 12 May 1943
- Launched: 25 July 1944
- Commissioned: 10 February 1945
- In service: March 1945
- Out of service: February 1969
- Motto: Manus haec inimica tyrannis : ‘This hand is deadly to tyrants’
- Fate: Sold for scrap to BISCO on 23 October 1970 and broken up by J Cashmore. She arrived in tow at the breakers yard in Newport on 15 November 1970.
- Badge: On a Field Red, out of a ducal coronet gold, an ostrich head Silver in his beak a key Gold.

General characteristics
- Class & type: C-class destroyer
- Displacement: 1,710 tons (1,730 tonnes); 2,530 tons full (2,570 tonnes)
- Length: 362.75 ft (110.57 m) o/a
- Beam: 35.75 ft (10.90 m)
- Draught: 10 ft (3.0 m)
- Propulsion: 2 Admiralty 3-drum boilers, Parsons single-reduction geared steam turbines, 40,000 shp (30 MW), 2 shafts
- Speed: 36 kn (67 km/h) / 32 kn (59 km/h) full
- Range: 4,675 nmi (8,658 km) at 20 kn (37 km/h); 1,400 nmi (2,600 km) at 32 knots (59 km/h)
- Complement: 186 (222 as leader)
- Sensors & processing systems: Radar Type 276 target indication; Radar Type 291 air warning; Radar Type 285 fire control on director Type K; Radar Type 282 fire control on 40 mm mount Mk.IV
- Armament: 4 × QF 4.5 in (114 mm) L/45 guns Mark IV on mounts CP Mk.V; 2 × Bofors 40 mm L/60 guns on twin mount "Hazemeyer" Mk.IV, or; 4 × QF 2 pdr L/39 guns Mk.VIII on quad mount Mk.VII (Caprice only); 4 × anti-aircraft mountings; Single Bofors 40 mm Mk.III; Single QF 2 - pdr Mk.VIII Mk.XVI; Single Oerlikon 20 mm P Mk.III; Twin Oerlikon 20 mm Mk.V; 10 (2x5) tubes for 21 inch (533 mm) torpedoes Mk.IX; 4 throwers and 2 racks for 96 depth charges

HMS Carysfort was a C-class destroyer of the Royal Navy. She was ordered in 1941, originally under the name HMS Pique.

Her name was changed to conform with the initials "Ca" to her seven sister ships. She is named after John Proby, a politician who was also a Lord of the Admiralty in 1750. In 1752 he was created Baron Carysfort. His son, William Proby, Lord Proby, and his grandson, Granville Proby, 3rd Earl of Carysfort, were both naval officers, the latter eventually became an Admiral. She was the fifth Royal Navy warship to carry the name Carysfort. She was built and engined by J. Samuel White & Co. The keel was to be laid down on 4 May 1943 but was delayed until 12 May 1943 because of German bombing raids. She was launched on 25 July 1944 and completed on 20 February 1945. Her original pennant number was R25 changing to D25 after the Second World War.

== Operational service ==
Following commissioning, Carysfort worked up at Scapa Flow before joining the 6th Destroyer Flotilla of the Home Fleet. on 4 March 1945, she took part in Operation Judgement, forming part of the escort of the escort carriers Queen, Searcher and Trumpeter as their aircraft attacked shipping off the coast of Norway and at Kilbotn harbour near Narvik, sinking the submarine U-711, the depot ship Black Watch and a trawler. From June to October 1945, Caryfort was refitted at Devonport, having the ship's planned Director Control Tower fitted. She was then ordered to join the East Indies Fleet, where she took part in operations against Indonesian nationalist forces in the Dutch East Indies.

After returning to Britain early in 1946, Carysfort was placed in reserve at Portsmouth, briefly recommissioning in 1947 for a training cruise to the Mediterranean before returning to reserve. She was modernised by Yarrows at their Scotstoun shipyard between 23 January 1954 and 14 December 1956, and then re-entered service as part of the 6th Destroyer Squadron. Carysfort served two commissions with the 6th Squadron, with the flotilla alternating between home waters and the Mediterranean. From 1956 to 1958 R J Trowbridge captained her in the Mediterranean. In 1959 Carysfort was part of the Home Fleet and took part in 'Navy Days' in Portsmouth during that year. In September 1959, Carysfort transferred to the 8th Destroyer Squadron as a replacement for Cheviot, arriving at the Squadron's base at Singapore in November that year. She subsequently served in the Far East during the Indonesian Confrontation.

Between November 1962 and May 1964 she underwent a refit at Gibraltar and then joined the 27th Escort Squadron and spent two deployments in the Mediterranean and Far East. In June 1966, Carysfort was ordered to the Seychelles when labour disputes brought the threat of violence. While no intervention by the destroyer was needed in the end, the ship's crew suffered an outbreak of dysentery while at the Seychelles, forcing the temporary introduction of quarantine measures aboard the ship to control the outbreak. She was the Teignmouth Regatta guardship from 19-23 August 1967 when the public was allowed to board. Her last deployment was to the Far East between 20 November 1967 and 14 November 1968.

She remained in the Active Fleet until February 1969 when she was placed in Reserve. After being placed on the Disposal List she was sold on 20 October 1970 to BISCO for demolition by J Cashmore. She arrived in tow at the breakers yard in Newport on 15 November that year.

== Publications ==
- Colledge, J. J.; Warlow, Ben (2006) [1969]. Ships of the Royal Navy: The Complete Record of All Fighting Ships of the Royal Navy from the 15th Century to the Present (3rd Rev ed.). London: Chatham Publishing. ISBN 978-1-86176-281-8. OCLC 67375475.
- Critchley, Mike (1982). British Warships Since 1945: Part 3: Destroyers. Liskeard, UK: Maritime Books. ISBN 0-9506323-9-2.
- English, John (2008). Obdurate to Daring: British Fleet Destroyers 1941–45. Windsor, UK: World Ship Society. ISBN 978-0-9560769-0-8.
- Marriott, Leo (1989). Royal Navy Destroyers Since 1945. Ian Allan Ltd. ISBN 0-7110-1817-0.
- Rohwer, Jürgen; Hümmelchen, Gerhard (1992). Chronology of the War at Sea 1939–1945. London: Greenhill Books. ISBN 1-85367-117-7.
