= 853 Naval Air Squadron =

Inactive flying squadron of the Royal Navy's Fleet Air Arm

- Squadron badge
- Active: 1943–1945
- Disbanded: 30 May 1945
- Country: United Kingdom
- Branch: Royal Navy
- Type: Torpedo Bomber Reconnaissance squadron
- Role: Carrier-based: anti-submarine warfare (ASW); anti-surface warfare (ASuW); Combat air patrol (CAP)
- Size: Twelve aircraft
- Part of: Fleet Air Arm
- Home station: See Naval air stations section for full list.
- Engagements: World War II: European theatre of World War II; Arctic convoys of World War II; Operation Judgement
- Battle honours: Arctic 1944-45; Norway, 1945

Insignia
- Squadron Badge Description: Blue, mounted on a Pegasus forcené a Greek warrior armed with a spear and shield all gold (1944)
- Identification markings: 3A+ (Avenger); TA+ (Avenger on Tracker); QA+ (Avenger on Queen January 1945); TA+ (Wildcat); QA+ (Wildcat January 1945)

Aircraft flown
- Bomber: Grumman Avenger
- Fighter: Grumman Wildcat

853 Naval Air Squadron (853 NAS), otherwise referred to as 853 Squadron, is an inactive Fleet Air Arm (FAA) naval air squadron of the United Kingdom’s Royal Navy (RN). It last operated both Grumman Avenger Mk.II torpedo bomber and Grumman Wildcat Mk VI fighter aircraft during the Second World War, later based out of RNAS Hatston (HMS Sparrowhawk), Mainland, Orkney.

It was established at RN Air Section Squantum as a Torpedo Bomber Reconnaissance (TBR) squadron, in December 1943. After training, it joined HMS Arbiter in May and set sail for the UK. At the same time, a fighter flight of four Grumman Wildcat Mk V was created at HMS Gannet, RNAS Eglinton, but it disbanded after just ten days on HMS Formidable in June 1944. A new fighter flight was formed with four Grumman Wildcat Mk VI in September 1944, preparing for the squadron to join HMS Tracker in September to escort an Arctic convoy. The squadron moved to HMS Queen in January 1945, for operations off Norway, followed by more Arctic convoy missions, using HMS Sparrowhawk, RNAS Hatston, as a shore base. It was disbanded in May 1945.

== History ==
=== Torpedo, Bomber, Reconnaissance squadron (1943-1945) ===
The squadron was officially established on 1 December 1943 at RN Air Section Squantum, which was situated at Naval Air Station Squantum, Quincy, Massachusetts, designated as a Torpedo Bomber Reconnaissance unit, equipped with twelve Grumman Avenger Mk.II torpedo bomber aircraft, which later embarked aboard the Ruler-class escort carrier, HMS Queen.

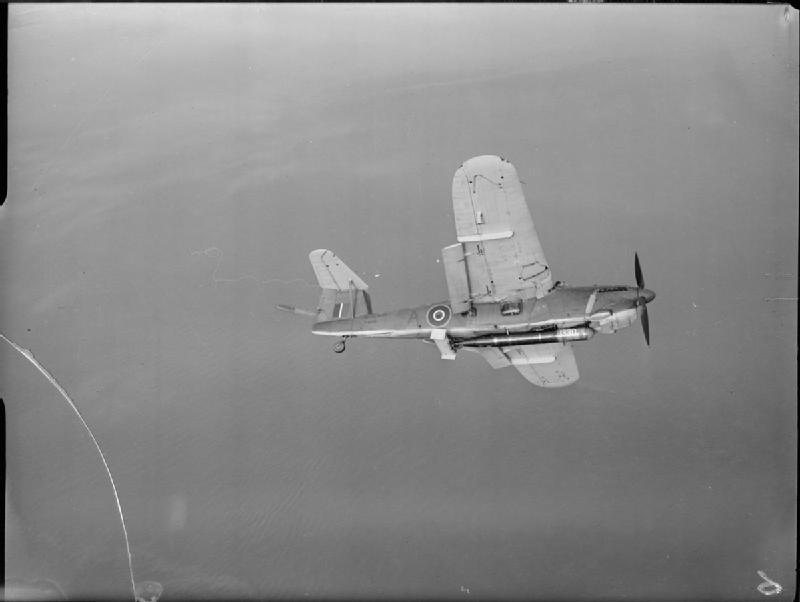
Fairey Barracuda Mk.II; an example of the type used by 853 Squadron

A majority of the pilots had recently completed their training in Florida, while the observers were trained in Trinidad, and the Telegraphist Air Gunners hailed from the United Kingdom. The initial preparation phase was hampered by severe cold conditions, which occasionally resulted in the freezing of the waters in Boston Bay. In March 1944, the squadron dispatched the ground personnel and supplies to Vancouver, Canada, via train, subsequently flying across the United States with a route that included Virginia, Georgia, Louisiana, Texas, Arizona, and California before arriving in Vancouver.

Following the completion of their training, the squadron embarked on the Ruler-class escort carrier, HMS Arbiter, on 31 May 1944, and set sail for the United Kingdom. Concurrently, a fighter flight consisting of four Grumman Wildcat Mk V fighter aircraft was established at RNAS Eglinton (HMS Gannet), County Londonderry, Northern Ireland; however, this unit was disbanded after a brief ten-day period aboard the Illustrious-class aircraft carrier, HMS Formidable, in June 1944.

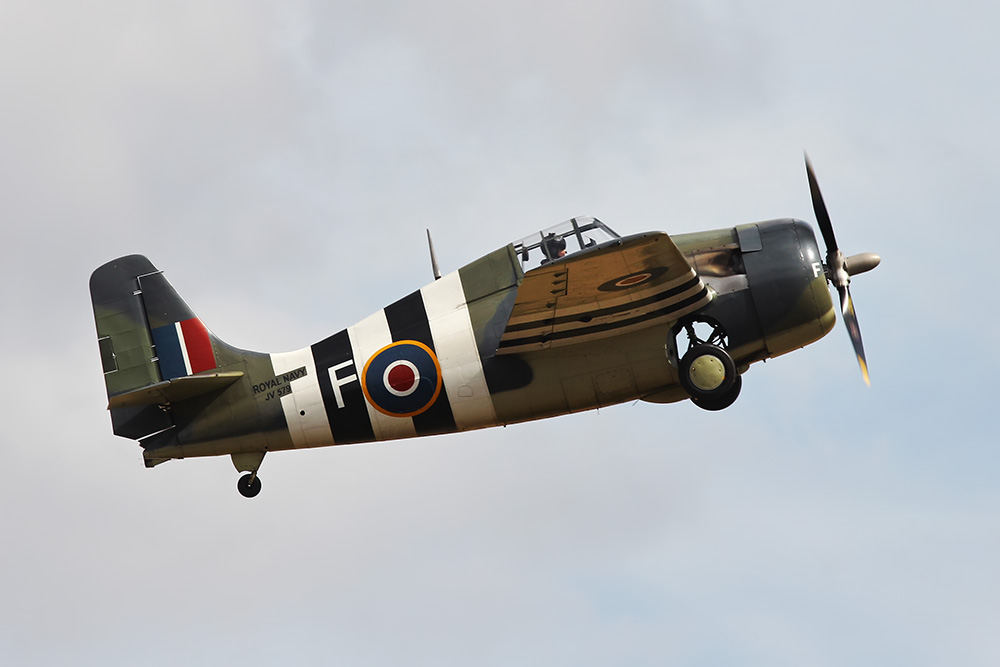
Grumman Wildcat; an example of the type used by 853 Squadron

In August, a new fighter flight consisting of four Grumman Wildcat Mk.VI was established. During the same month, the entire squadron was integrated into Attacker-class escort carrier, HMS Tracker. By October, the ship commenced anti-submarine patrols while providing escort for a North Russian convoy.

The squadron was reassigned to the Ruler-class escort carrier, HMS Queen, on 27 January 1945, to conduct operations in the vicinity of Norway, subsequently engaging in additional Arctic convoy missions, utilising RNAS Hatston (HMS Sparrowhawk), Mainland, Orkney, as its land-based support facility.

On 4 May, as part of Operation Judgement and conducted with 846 Naval Air Squadron from the Ruler-class escort carrier, HMS Trumpeter, led to the destruction of the German submarine U-711, as well as the depot ship MS Black Watch and the torpedo carrier Meteor, in an assault near Harstadt, Norway.

The conflict in Europe concluded shortly thereafter, leading to the disbandment of the squadron on 30 May.

== Aircraft flown ==
The squadron has flown a couple of different aircraft types:

- Grumman Avenger Mk.II torpedo bomber (December 1943 - May 1945)
- Grumman Wildcat Mk V fighter aircraft (May - June 1944)
- Grumman Wildcat Mk VI fighter aircraft (September 1944 - May 1945)

== Battle honours ==
The following Battle Honours have been awarded to 853 Naval Air Squadron:

- Arctic 1944-45
- Norway 1945

== Naval air stations and aircraft carriers ==
853 Naval Air Squadron operated from a number of naval air stations of the Royal Navy, in the UK and also a number of Royal Navy escort carriers and other airbases overseas:

- RN Air Section Squantum, Massachusetts, (4 December 1943 - 1 March 1944)
- RN Air Section Norfolk, Virginia, (Detachment Deck Landing Training USS Charger 17 - 19 January 1944)
- transit (1 - 10 March 1944)
- RCAF Station Sea Island, British Columbia, (10 March - 4 April 1944)
- HMS Arbiter (4 April - 21 June 1944)
- Royal Naval Air Station Machrihanish (HMS Landrail), Argyll and Bute, (21 June - 11 July 1944)
  - Fighter Flight:
    - Royal Naval Air Station Eglinton (HMS Gannet), County Londonderry, (May - 14 June 1944)
    - HMS Formidable (14 - 24 June 1944)
    - disbanded - (24 June 1944)
- Royal Naval Air Station Maydown (HMS Shrike), County Londonderry, (11 - 29 July 1944)
- Royal Naval Air Station Machrihanish (HMS Landrail), Argyll and Bute, (29 July - 12 September 1944)
  - Royal Naval Air Station Eglinton (HMS Gannet), County Londonderry, Fighter Flight (28 August - 17 September 1944)
- HMS Tracker (12 September - 6 October 1944)
- Royal Naval Air Station Machrihanish (HMS Landrail), Argyll and Bute, (6 - 14 October 1944)
- HMS Tracker (14 October - 28 November 1944)
- Royal Naval Air Station Machrihanish (HMS Landrail), Argyll and Bute, (28 November - 4 December 1944)
- Royal Naval Air Station Hatston (HMS Sparrowhawk), Mainland, Orkney, (4 December 1944 - 25 January 1945)
  - Fighter Flight:
    - HMS Premier (11 - 18 December 1944)
    - HMS Campania (21 - 31 January 1945)
- Royal Naval Air Station Ayr (HMS Wagtail), Ayrshire, (25 - 27 January 1945)
- HMS Queen (27 January - 29 March 1945)
- Royal Air Naval Station Hatston (HMS Sparrowhawk), Mainland, Orkney, (29 March - 5 April 1945)
- HMS Queen (5 - 13 Apri 1945)
- Royal Naval Air Station Hatston (HMS Sparrowhawk), Mainland, Orkney, (13 - 27 April 1945)
- HMS Queen (27 April - 30 May 1945)
- Royal Naval Air Station Hatston (HMS Sparrowhawk), Mainland, Orkney, disbanded - (30 May 1945)

== Commanding officers ==
List of commanding officers of 853 Naval Air Squadron, with date of appointment:

- Lieutenant Commander(A) N.G. Haigh, RNVR, from 1 November 1943
- Lieutenant Commander(A) J.M. Glaser, RN, from 20 December 1944
- disbanded - 30 May 1945

Note: Abbreviation (A) signifies Air Branch of the RN or RNVR.
