= HMS Searcher (D40) =

1943 Ruler-class escort carrier of the Royal Navy

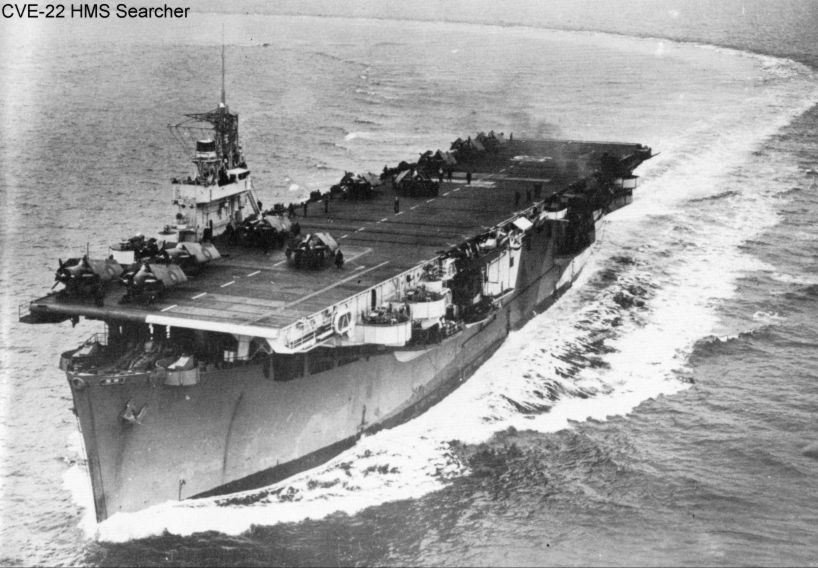
- HMS Searcher

History

United States
- Name: USS AVG-22
- Builder: Seattle-Tacoma Shipbuilding Corporation
- Laid down: 20 February 1942
- Launched: 20 June 1942
- Fate: Transferred to the Royal Navy

United Kingdom
- Name: HMS Searcher
- Commissioned: 7 April 1943
- Identification: Pennant number: D20
- Fate: Returned to the US Navy in 1945; Listed for disposal on 7 February 1946; Sold to J & A T Vatis in 1952

Greece
- Name: Captain Theo
- Owner: J & A T Vatis
- Acquired: 1952
- Identification: IMO number: 6116575
- Fate: Sold to Tung Chao Yung in 1966

Taiwan
- Name: Oriental Banker
- Owner: Tung Chao Yung
- Acquired: 1966
- Identification: IMO number: 6116575
- Fate: Scrapped on 21 April 1976 in Taiwan

General characteristics
- Class & type: Bogue-class escort carrier (US); Ruler-class escort carrier (UK)
- Displacement: As Searcher: 14,400 tons; As Captain Theo: 7129 tons; As Oriental Banker: 10542 tons
- Length: 491 ft 6 in (149.81 m)
- Beam: 69 ft 6 in (21.18 m)
- Draught: 26 ft (7.9 m)
- Installed power: 8,500 shp (6.3 MW)
- Propulsion: Steam turbines, 1 shaft
- Speed: 18 knots (33 km/h)
- Complement: 646 officers and men
- Armament: 2 × 4"/50, 5"/38 or 5"/51 guns; 4 × twin 40 mm Bofors; 20 × single 20 mm Oerlikon
- Aircraft carried: 20

HMS Searcher was a Ruler-class escort carrier of the Royal Navy. Built in Seattle as a Bogue-class escort carrier, she was transferred to the United Kingdom under Lend-Lease. Launched in 1942 she served until 29 November 1945. She was sold into merchant service and renamed Captain Theo. In 1966, she was renamed again to Oriental Banker and was finally scrapped in Taiwan in 1976.

== Design and description ==
Ruler-class ships were larger and had a greater aircraft capacity than the preceding American-built escort carrier classes, and were laid down as escort carriers, not converted from merchant ships. They had a complement of 646 men and an overall length of 492 feet 3 inches (150.0 m), a beam of 69 feet 6 inches (21.2 m) and a draught of 25 ft 6 in (7.8 m). Propulsion was provided by one shaft, two boilers and a steam turbine giving 9,350 shaft horsepower (6,970 kW), which could propel the ship at 16.5 knots (30.6 km/h; 19.0 mph).

Aircraft facilities were a small combined bridge–flight control on the starboard side, two aircraft lifts 43 feet (13.1 m) by 34 feet (10.4 m), one aircraft catapult and nine arrestor wires. Aircraft could be housed in the 260 feet (79.2 m) by 62 feet (18.9 m) hangar below the flight deck. Her armament consisted of two 4-inch/50, 5-inch/38 or 5-inch/51 dual purpose guns in single mounts, sixteen 40 mm Bofors anti-aircraft guns in twin mounts and twenty 20 mm Oerlikon anti-aircraft guns in single mounts. They had a maximum aircraft capacity of twenty-four aircraft which could be a mixture of Grumman Martlet, Vought F4U Corsair or Hawker Sea Hurricane fighter aircraft and Fairey Swordfish or Grumman Avenger anti-submarine aircraft.

== Wartime Service ==
From 1943 Searcher operated mainly around the UK as a Fighter Carrier. In late December 1943 she provided Atlantic convoy escort, escorting ships to the US, and arriving at Norfolk on 2 January 1944. She participated in the attacks on the German battleship Tirpitz as part of the Home Fleet Strike force of Operation Tungsten, during which her role was to provide fighter cover. In August 1944 she took part in Operation Dragoon, the Allied invasion of Southern France.

On 4 May 1945 aircraft from the escort carriers Searcher, Queen, and Trumpeter, taking part in Operation Judgement, sank the German submarine U-711 in Kilbotn harbour in the Arctic near Harstad, Norway. Grumman TBF Avenger torpedo bombers escorted by Grumman F4F Wildcat fighters attacked the U-boat crew barracks ship MS Black Watch, the submarine tender MS Senja and the floating flak battery Thetis (the former Norwegian coastal defence ship HNoMS Harald Haarfagre). U-711 was alongside Black Watch when she was sunk in position 68°43.717′N 16°34.600′E by bombs aimed at Black Watch. Black Watch and Senja were also sunk. This was the last sinking of a U-boat by the Fleet Air Arm, and the final air raid of the war in Europe.

Searcher was sent to the Far East as part of the British Pacific Fleet but arrived in mid-August as the war ended.

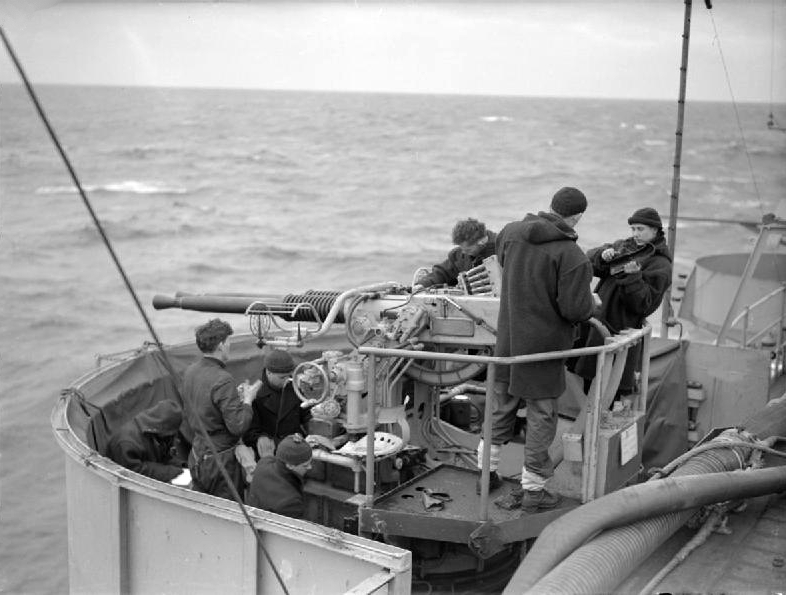
Twin 40 mm Bofors anti-aircraft gun

== Return to the US Navy ==
Searcher was returned to the US Navy under the terms of the Lend-Lease arrangement on 29 November 1945 and was listed for disposal on 7 February 1946.

== Merchant Service ==
The decommissioned escort carrier was sold to J & A T Vatis, a Greek shipping company, and renamed Captain Theo in 1952. In November 1961, she encountered and rescued 11-year-old Terry Jo Duperrault, who had been adrift at sea in a cork raft for four days after surviving a mass murder aboard the Bluebelle and the subsequent scuttling of the ketch by the murderer. The ship was sold again in 1966 to the Chinese shipping magnate Tung Chao Yung, becoming Oriental Banker.

== Fate ==
Oriental Banker was scrapped at Kaohsiung in Taiwan, commencing on 21 April 1976.
