= Norman Sailes =

- Born: 25 June 1920; Cheshire, England
- Died: 27 December 2012 (aged 92)
- Notable work: Awarded the Distinguished Service Cross

William Norman "Tiny" Sailes (25 June 1920 – 27 December 2012) was a Fleet Air Arm pilot of the Second World War who was awarded the Distinguished Service Cross for his part in the attack on the German U-boat base at Kilbotn in Norway on 4 May 1945. The attack was the last British air raid of the war.
