= Operation Judgement (1945) =

1945 British WWII naval operation in Norway

- Part of Second World War
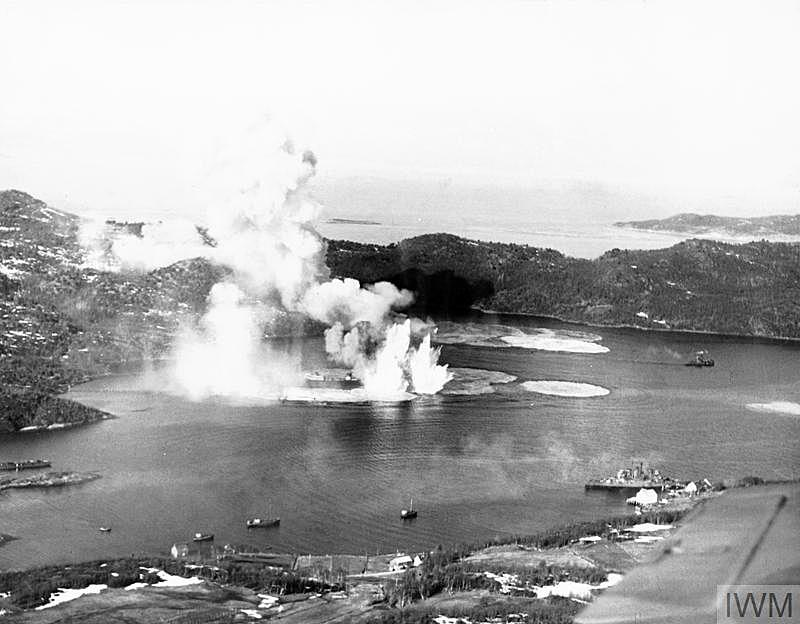
- Operation Judgement. The main targets of the attack, the depot ship Black Watch and U-711 are hidden behind water columns and smoke
Date	4 May 1945
Location	Kilbotn, Norway 68.7250°N 16.5650°E
Result	British victory

Belligerents
United Kingdom	Germany

Commanders and leaders
(United Kingdom) Rhoderick McGrigor	(Nazi Germany) Hans-Günther Lange

Strength
3 Fleet Air Arm Squadrons: 44 aircraft from 3 Escort carriers	Various anti aircraft defences, shipping, U-boats

Casualties and losses
2 aircraft 4 killed	1 U-boat sunk 2 ships sunk 150 killed or wounded
- Harstad, Norway

Operation Judgement was an operation carried out at the end of the Second World War by the Home Fleet of the British Royal Navy in Northern Norway on 4 May 1945. A force of 44 Fleet Air Arm aircraft attacked a U-boat base 5 mi (8.0 km) south of the town and port of Harstad. The attack was directed at vessels in the natural harbour at Kilbotn. It lasted seven minutes and left two ships and a U-boat sunk. No Norwegians in the village of Kilbotn were killed or injured during or after the attack. Operation Judgement was the last air raid of the war in Europe.

== Background ==
From 1939 to 1945 the German war effort made extensive use of the U-boat as a strategic weapon. From bases in Northern Norway U-boats sailed against the Allied convoys making for Russian ports in the Arctic Ocean. In autumn 1944, when German forces retreated from the extreme north, the U-boat base at Hammerfest was moved south to Kilbotn.

The base consisted of the 5,000 long tons (5,100 t) depot-ship Black Watch, a former North-Sea passenger ferry, supported by a Norwegian cruiser converted by the Germans into a flak-ship, two barges fitted with anti-aircraft guns and numerous gun emplacements on the land round the harbour. Several other ships were employed in ferrying supplies and ammunition to the base at Kilbotn, including the 950 long tons (970 t) Norwegian cargo ship Senja. The attack destroyed Black Watch and Senja and also U-711, which had been moored alongside Black Watch. Two British aircraft with four aircrew were lost, and an estimated 150 German personnel were either wounded or killed.

== The attack ==
The attack was carried out by the First Cruiser Squadron under the command of Vice Admiral Rhoderick McGrigor, second-in-command of the Home Fleet, in his flagship HMS Norfolk. The force included the cruiser Diadem, three escort carriers, and eight destroyers and other vessels. The carriers embarked three Naval Air Squadrons and 846 Squadron in HMS Trumpeter contributed eight Avenger torpedo-bombers and four Wildcat fighters, 853 Squadron in Queen contributed eight Avengers and four Wildcats and 882 Squadron in Searcher contributed twenty Wildcats. The force sailed from Scapa Flow on 1 May.

The force was aware of the strength of the defences at Kilbotn and of the presence of a German fighter base at Bardufoss, 50 mi (80 km) to the east. Four Wildcats were assigned to provide top-cover against German fighters, while the majority of the other Wildcats were to arrive at Kilbotn at the start of the operation, to attack the gun emplacements on land and in the harbour. Eight of the Wildcats were armed with a 250 lb (110 kg) bomb to attack the flak-ship Thetis (formerly HNoMS Harald Haarfagre). The Avengers would then arrive, each armed with four 500 lb (230 kg) bombs and carry out glide-bombing runs in quick succession, 846 Squadron attacking Black Watch and 853 Senja. Bombs were launched from a height of 2,000 ft (610 m) after a glide from 6,000–8,000 ft (1,800–2,400 m).

The German early-warning systems in the islands – radar, gun emplacements and spotters – could not have failed to observe and identify the aircraft passing over but by great good luck for the attackers, the headquarters staff at Harstad failed to circulate a warning. The airborne force, under the command of Lt. Cdr. C.L.F. Webb RN, arriving from the west over Kilbotn at 17:00 on a sunny afternoon, achieved almost complete surprise. In the initial attack, a Wildcat of 882 Squadron was hit and crashed into the water with the loss of the pilot. Several aircraft received flak damage in the next few minutes but the attack went according to plan. An Avenger of 846 Squadron made a forced landing with the loss of the crew.

In Kilbotn village, 1 mi (1.6 km) from the main target Black Watch, one bomb fell near some houses after a fault in the launching mechanism of one of the Avengers. With its time-delayed fuse, it exploded after entering soft ground, which absorbed most of the splinters. Two houses suffered windows blown out and some damaged woodwork.

The remaining 42 aircraft returned to the carriers. Onboard U-711 the harbour crew of eight, including the captain, Hans-Günther Lange, survived by moving the boat away from the vessels under attack. It was damaged and sank some hours later but the eight men were picked up. Lange was interviewed in 2008 at the age of 92 for a book published in Norway which also contains information from Norwegian and British eyewitnesses. A summary of the Operation is also given on a Norwegian website for divers, and background information is given in the Commander-in-Chief Home Fleet's War Diary for 1945.

== Aftermath ==
The First Cruiser Squadron sailed south to provide air-cover for Operation Cleaver, the passage of ships in the Skagerrak and arrived back at Scapa Flow on 10 May. The attack on Kilbotn was one of the last actions in the Allied campaign against the U-boat menace. Captain Lange reported in 2008 that Germany's leader Dönitz had ordered the immediate cessation of all U-boat attacks on Allied shipping as part of the surrender of naval forces on 4/5 May. Lange stated that this signal had been received on board U-711 in the early afternoon and therefore his crew believed their war was over before the Fleet Air Arm attack arrived. Despite this, U-boat operations and allied counter-measures continued until the final German surrender on 8 May. The last U-boat destroyed, and the last Allied ships sunk, were in the actions of 7/8 May 1945.

Of the four British aircrew lost in Operation Judgement, Lt. Hugh Morrison from Wairarapa, New Zealand, Senior Pilot of 882 Squadron, is buried in Narvik New Cemetery. The other three were buried by the Germans, assisted by a Norwegian priest with local Norwegians present, in the Sandtorg Church churchyard in the nearby village of Sørvik. Photographs of the area, some aircraft parts and photographs of the graves of Lt. Francis Gahan, Sub-Lt. Alasdair Elder and L/A Peter Mansfield of 846 Squadron can be seen on the web.

Decorations to personnel taking part in Operation Judgement were awarded in the King's Birthday Honours of June 14 and listed in the London Gazette. The commanding officer of Trumpeter, Capt. K. S. Colquhoun RN, was appointed to the Distinguished Service Order.

Details of the wrecks of Black Watch and U-711 are available on the web.

In June 2013 people from Kilbotn and Harstad fixed a board on the hillside at Barnvika, as close as possible to the Black Watch anchorage, giving details of the action. It was described in the newspaper Harstad Tidende.
