= HMS Formidable (67) =

1940 Illustrious-class aircraft carrier of the Royal Navy

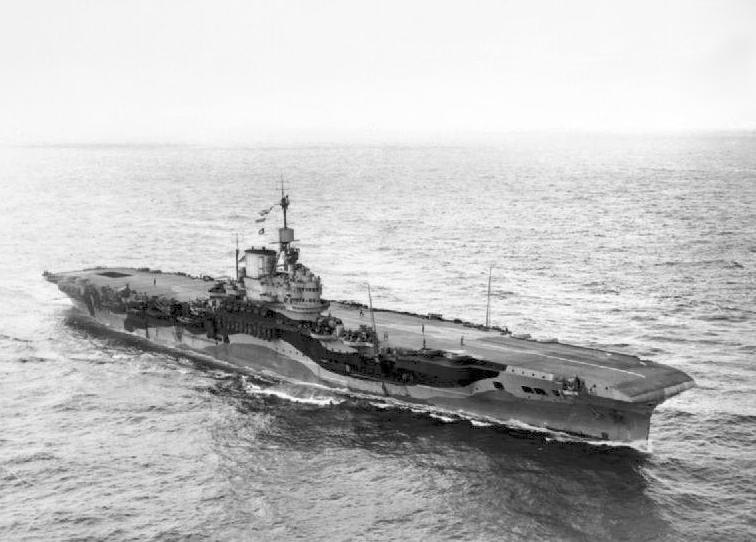
- Formidable underway, 3 August 1942

History

United Kingdom
- Name: Formidable
- Operator: Royal Navy
- Builder: Harland & Wolff
- Yard number: 1007
- Laid down: 17 June 1937
- Launched: 17 August 1939
- Sponsored by: Lady Kingsley Wood
- Commissioned: 24 November 1940
- Decommissioned: 12 August 1947
- Identification: Pennant number: 67
- Nickname(s): The Ship That Launched Herself
- Honours and awards: Matapan 1941; Crete 1941; North Africa 1942–43; Sicily 1943; Salerno 1943; Okinawa 1945; Japan 1945
- Fate: Sold for scrap, January 1953

General characteristics (as built)
- Class & type: Illustrious-class aircraft carrier
- Displacement: 23,000 long tons (23,369 t) (standard)
- Length: 740 ft (225.6 m) (o/a); 710 ft (216.4 m) (waterline)
- Beam: 95 ft 9 in (29.2 m)
- Draught: 28 ft 10 in (8.8 m) (deep load)
- Installed power: 111,000 shp (83,000 kW); 6 Admiralty 3-drum boilers
- Propulsion: 3 shafts; 3 geared steam turbines
- Speed: 30.5 knots (56.5 km/h; 35.1 mph)
- Range: 10,700 nmi (19,800 km; 12,300 mi) at 10 knots (19 km/h; 12 mph)
- Complement: 1,299
- Sensors & processing systems: 1 × Type 79 early-warning radar
- Armament: 8 × twin 4.5 in (110 mm) DP guns; 6 × octuple 2 pdr (40 mm (1.6 in)) AA guns
- Armour: Waterline belt: 4.5 in (114 mm); Flight deck: 3 in (76 mm); Hangar sides and ends: 4.5 in (114 mm); Bulkheads: 2.5 in (64 mm)
- Aircraft carried: 36–54
- Aviation facilities: 1 catapult

HMS Formidable was an Illustrious-class aircraft carrier ordered for the Royal Navy before the Second World War. After being completed in late 1940, she was briefly assigned to the Home Fleet before being transferred to the Mediterranean Fleet as a replacement for her crippled sister ship Illustrious. Formidable's aircraft played a key role in the Battle of Cape Matapan in early 1941, and they subsequently provided cover for Allied ships and attacked Axis forces until their carrier was badly damaged by German dive bombers in May.

Assigned to the Eastern Fleet in the Indian Ocean in early 1942, Formidable covered the invasion of Diego Suarez in Vichy-controlled Madagascar in mid-1942 against the possibility of a sortie by the Japanese into the Indian Ocean. Formidable returned home for a brief refit before participating in Operation Torch, the invasion of French North Africa in November. She remained in the Mediterranean and covered the invasions of Sicily and mainland Italy in 1943 before beginning a lengthy refit.

Formidable made several attacks on the German battleship Tirpitz in Norway in mid-1944 as part of the Home Fleet. She was subsequently assigned to the British Pacific Fleet (BPF) in 1945 where she played a supporting role during the Battle of Okinawa and later attacked targets in the Japanese Home Islands. The ship was used to repatriate liberated Allied prisoners of war and soldiers after the Japanese surrender and then ferried British personnel across the globe through 1946. She was placed in reserve the following year and sold for scrap in 1953.

== Background and description ==
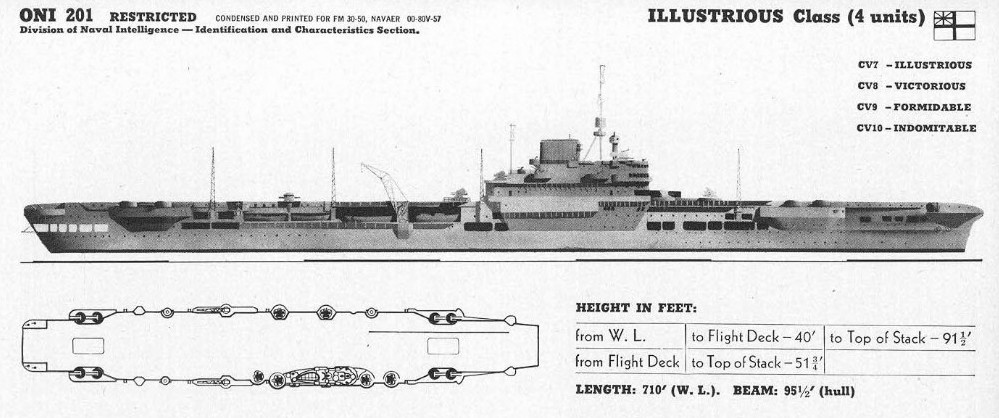
US Office of Naval Intelligence recognition drawing of the Illustrious-class carriers

The Royal Navy's 1936 Naval Programme authorised the construction of two aircraft carriers. Admiral Sir Reginald Henderson, Third Sea Lord and Controller of the Navy, was determined not to simply modify the previous unarmoured Ark Royal design. He believed that carriers could not be successfully defended by their own aircraft without some form of early-warning system. Lacking that, there was nothing to prevent land-based aircraft from attacking them, especially in confined waters like the North and Mediterranean Seas. This meant that the ship had to be capable of remaining in action after sustaining damage, and that her fragile aircraft had to be protected entirely from damage. The only way to do this was to completely armour the hangar in which the aircraft would shelter, but putting that much weight so high in the ship allowed only a single-storey hangar due to stability concerns. This halved the aircraft capacity of the Illustrious class compared with the older unarmoured carriers, trading offensive potential for defensive survivability.

Formidable had a length of 740 feet (225.6 m) overall and 710 feet (216.4 m) at the waterline. Her beam was 95 feet 9 inches (29.2 m) at the waterline and she had a draught of 28 feet 10 inches (8.8 m) at deep load. She displaced 23,000 long tons (23,369 t) at standard load as completed. Her complement was approximately 1,299 men upon completion in 1940. The ship had three Parsons geared steam turbines, each driving one shaft using steam supplied by six Admiralty 3-drum boilers. The turbines were designed to produce a total of 111,000 shp (83,000 kW), enough to give a maximum speed of 30.5 knots (56.5 km/h; 35.1 mph). On sea trials, Formidable reached 30.6 knots (56.7 km/h; 35.2 mph) with 112,018 shp (83,532 kW). She carried a maximum of 4,850 long tons (4,930 t) of fuel oil, which gave her a range of 10,700 nautical miles (19,800 km; 12,300 mi) at 10 knots (19 km/h; 12 mph).

The 753-foot (229.5 m) armoured flight deck had a usable length of 670 feet (204.2 m), due to prominent "round-downs" (Note: "Round-downs" were places at the ends of the flight deck that were faired into the hull; they were generally not usable by aircraft or equipment because they were not level.) at bow and stern to reduce air turbulence, and a maximum width of 95 feet (29 m). A single hydraulic aircraft catapult was fitted on the forward part of the flight deck. The ship was equipped with two unarmoured lifts on the centreline, each of which measured 45 by 22 feet (13.7 by 6.7 m). The hangar was 456 feet (139 m) long and had a maximum width of 62 feet (18.9 m). It had a height of 16 feet (4.9 m), which allowed storage of Vought F4U Corsair fighters (once their wingtips were clipped) under the Lend-Lease program. The ship could accommodate up to 54 aircraft rather than the intended 36 after the adoption of "outriggers" on the flight deck during the war and the flattening of the "round-downs" that increased the usable length of the flight deck to 740 feet (225.6 m) to facilitate the use of a permanent deck park. (Note: The precise dates for these changes are not known, but most probably occurred during her 1943–1944 refit, based on the changes made to her sister Illustrious.) The additional crewmen, maintenance personnel and facilities needed to support the extra aircraft severely crowded the ship. She was provided with 50,650 imperial gallons (230,300 L; 60,830 US gal) of petrol.

=== Armament, electronics and protection ===
The ship's main armament consisted of sixteen quick-firing (QF) 4.5-inch (114 mm) dual-purpose guns in eight twin-gun turrets that were mounted in sponsons on the side of the hull. The roofs of the gun turrets protruded above the level of the flight deck to allow them to fire across the deck at high elevations. The gun had a maximum range of 20,760 yards (18,980 m). Her light anti-aircraft defences consisted of six octuple mounts for QF two-pounder 2 pdr (40 mm (1.6 in)) ("pom-pom") anti-aircraft (AA) guns, two each fore and aft of the island and two in sponsons on the port side of the hull. The two-pounder gun had a maximum range of 6,800 yards (6,200 m).

While under repair in late 1941, Formidable's light AA armament was augmented by the addition of 10 Oerlikon 20-millimetre (0.8 in) autocannon in single mounts with a maximum range of 4,800 yards (4,400 m). By the time of her last recorded refit in March 1944, she had exchanged one octuple "pom-pom" mount for a quadruple mount and had a total of 20 twin and 14 single 20 mm mounts. Before seeing combat against the Japanese, some were replaced by 40-millimetre (1.6 in) Bofors AA guns as the 20 mm shell was unlikely to destroy a kamikaze before it hit the ship. The Bofors gun had a maximum range of 10,750 yards (9,830 m). By the war's end the ship had all six of her original octuple "pom-pom" mounts, five single 40 mm power-operated mounts, seven single 40 mm "Boffin" mounts and 11 twin and 12 single 20 mm mounts.

Formidable was completed with a Type 79 early-warning radar. The specifics of the additional radars fitted during the war are not readily available, but she probably had, by the end of the war, a Type 277 surface-search/height-finding radar on top of the bridge and a Type 293 target-indicator radar on the foremast. She also probably mounted Type 279 and Type 281B early-warning radars, based on those fitted aboard her sister ship Victorious. In addition, Type 282 and Type 285 gunnery radars were mounted on the fire-control directors.

The Illustrious-class ships had a flight deck protected by 3 inches (76 mm) of armour, and the internal sides and ends of the hangars were 4.5 inches thick. The hangar deck itself was 2.5 inches (64 mm) thick and extended the full width of the ship to meet the top of the 4.5-inch waterline armour belt. The belt was closed by 2.5-inch transverse bulkheads fore and aft. The underwater defence system was a layered system of liquid- and air-filled compartments backed by a 1.5-inch (38 mm) splinter bulkhead.

== Construction and service ==
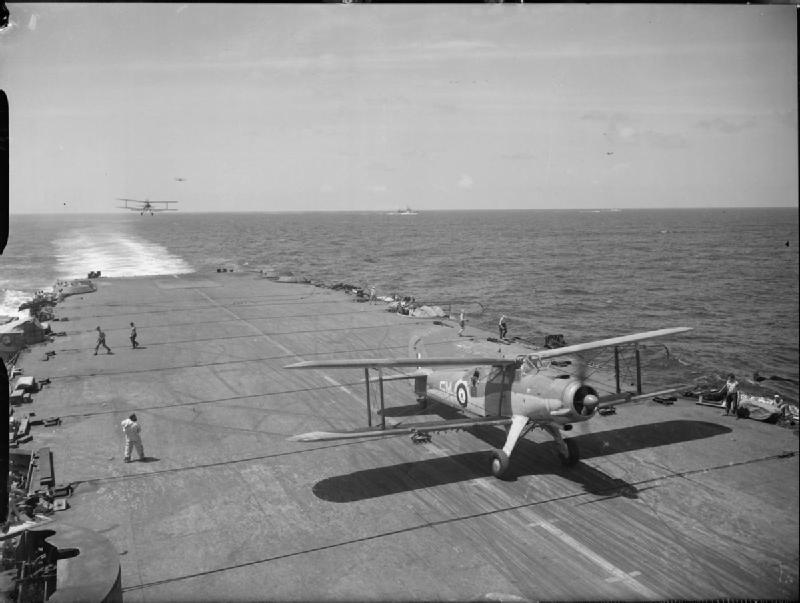
An Albacore taxiing forward and another about to land

Formidable was ordered as part of the 1937 Naval Programme from Harland & Wolff. She was laid down at their Belfast shipyard on 17 June 1937 as yard number 1007 and launched on 17 August 1939. Just before the launch ceremony was to begin, the wooden cradle supporting the ship collapsed, and the ship slid down the slipway while workmen were still underneath and around the ship. One spectator was killed by flying debris and at least 20 others were injured. Formidable was not damaged and because of the incident, was referred to as "The Ship That Launched Herself". She was commissioned on 24 November 1940.

After a very brief work up, the Fairey Albacore torpedo bombers of 826 Naval Air Squadron and 829 Squadron and the Fairey Fulmar fighters of 803 Squadron flew aboard and she joined the Home Fleet at Scapa Flow on 12 December. Her stay there was brief as she, escorted by the heavy cruisers Dorsetshire and Norfolk, sailed on 18 December to protect convoys and search for the German cruiser Admiral Scheer, which had recently attacked Convoy HX 84 in the North Atlantic. They failed to find the commerce raider and escorted a convoy to Cape Town, South Africa, arriving on 22 January 1941. Four days later the ship was ordered north to replace her sister Illustrious with the Mediterranean Fleet after she had been badly damaged by German dive bombers. En route, she took the opportunity to attack Italian forces in Italian Somaliland and Eritrea. They sank the 5,723-gross register ton (GRT) steamer Moncalieri on 12 February for the loss of two Albacores.

=== Battle of Cape Matapan ===
Several weeks later, she made a cautious transit of the Suez Canal (which was recently mined) and reached Alexandria on 10 March. 829 Squadron was issued Fairey Swordfish torpedo bombers to replace its losses. On 20 March Formidable escorted a convoy to Malta and flew off five aircraft for Crete while returning to Alexandria. On the morning of 27 March, major elements of the Italian Fleet were spotted en route to the sea lanes between Egypt and Greece and the carrier sailed later that afternoon with a force of three battleships, cruisers and destroyers under the command of Admiral Sir Andrew Cunningham. Reinforced by three Fulmars from 806 Squadron, her air group numbered 13 Fulmars, 10 Albacores and 4 Swordfish. An Albacore spotted the leading Italian ships the next morning and six Albacores with torpedoes attacked Italian battleship Vittorio Veneto. Two German Junkers Ju 88 bombers intervened, but they were driven off by the escorting pair of Fulmars. The attack failed and another strike force of three Albacores and two Swordfish was prepared. Shortly after launching them at 12:22, Formidable was attacked by a pair of torpedo-carrying Savoia-Marchetti SM.79 bombers to no effect. Around 14:50, one Albacore torpedoed the Italian battleship, although the other aircraft missed. The hit briefly knocked out her engines and caused heavy flooding. Another air strike of six Albacores and two Swordfish was launched at 17:30 to finish off the battleship, but they mistook the Italian cruiser Pola for it in the fading light.

The cruiser was struck by a torpedo from one of the aircraft, possibly from one of two Swordfish from 815 Squadron from Maleme, Crete, that joined Formidable's aircraft before the attack. The mistake allowed the battleship to reach port. One Albacore was shot down by Vittorio Veneto and two others were forced to ditch after running out of fuel. Cunningham continued the pursuit of the Italian ships into the night. Unaware of the British pursuit, a squadron of cruisers and destroyers was ordered to return and help Pola. This squadron included Pola's sister ships, Zara and Fiume while Vittorio Veneto and the other ships continued to Taranto. In the darkness and without radar the Italian cruisers were surprised and the three battleships plus Formidable were able to close to 3,800 yd (3,500 m) and open fire. After three minutes, Fiume and Zara had been destroyed. Formidable which was third in line behind Warspite and Valiant and ahead of Barham received the order to open fire with her 4.5-inch guns although the order was almost immediately countermanded and she was ordered out of line to starboard as soon as it was realised such a valuable ship was so close to the Italian ships. Some of Formidable's 4.5-inch guns fired a salvo in what was one of the few occasions in the Second World War in which an aircraft carrier fired her main armament at enemy warships.

On 18 April the Mediterranean Fleet sortied to bombard the primary Axis supply port of Tripoli and was attacked by a pair of SM.79 torpedo bombers from Rhodes. The torpedo-bombers were intercepted by a pair of Fulmars that damaged one bomber badly enough that it crash-landed back at its base, although one Fulmar was also forced to crash-land aboard Formidable. The next day Fulmars from 806 Squadron shot down one CANT Z.1007 bomber flying from Cyrenica to Sicily and a pair of Junkers Ju 52 transports flying fuel to North Africa. On the morning of 21 April, the carrier's aircraft dropped flares to illuminate the port so it could be shelled by three battleships and a light cruiser. On the way home, a pair of Fulmars shot down a Dornier Do 24 flying boat.

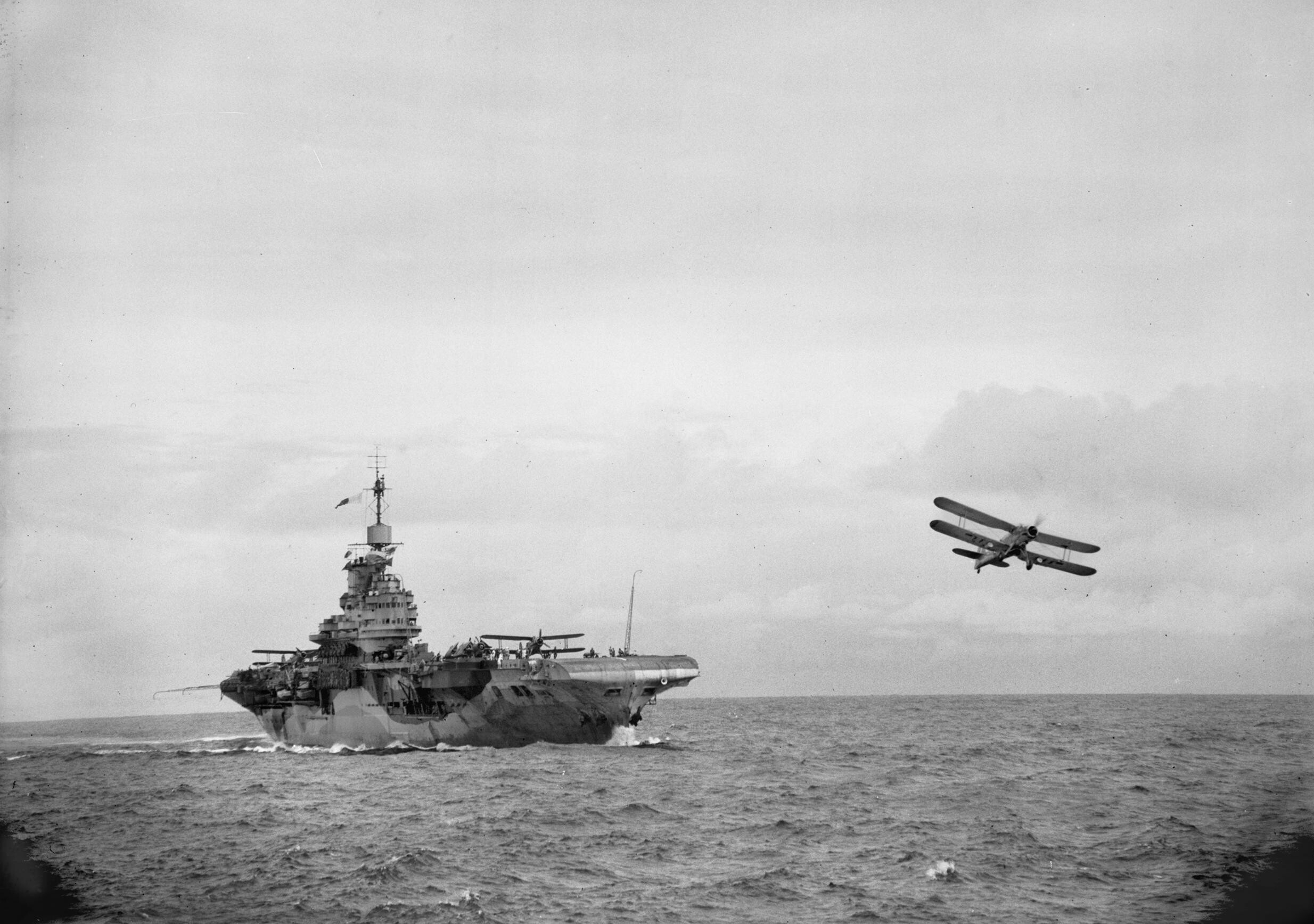
An Albacore after taken off, with two more ranged on deck, 1942

During the Evacuation of Greece, Formidable provided air cover for Convoy GA 15 on 29 April. A Fulmar from 803 Squadron was forced to ditch on 2 May before the carrier returned to Alexandria the next day. She put to sea on 6 May to provide air cover for the convoys involved in Operation Tiger. On the morning of 8 May, a pair of Fulmars claimed to have shot down a pair of Z.1007s searching for the fleet; one Fulmar failed to return. Later that afternoon, the fighters shot down four German Heinkel He 111 bombers at the cost of one Fulmar forced to crash-land. Two Albacores and a Fulmar crashed due to non-combat causes during the day. The next day a pair of Fulmars from 806 Squadron badly damaged a Ju 88 reconnaissance bomber that crash-landed at its base in Sicily. As the fleet and the Tiger convoy approached Alexandria on 11 May, a pair of Fulmars attacked a formation of Ju 88s, damaging one bomber; one Fulmar and another Ju 88 were seen falling together towards the sea. Many of the Fulmars had been rendered unserviceable during the operation and Formidable was unable to provide air cover until they were repaired.

On 26 May the fleet sortied for a dawn raid on the base at Scarpanto the next day; the carrier mustered 12 Fulmars and 15 Albacores and Swordfish. Six Albacores and four Fulmars attacked the airbase, destroying one Ju 88 and damaging two others. Also damaged were an Italian Savoia-Marchetti SM.81 transport and six Fiat CR.42 Falco fighters. Later that morning, as the fleet was returning to Egypt, the Fulmars shot down a He 111 and two Ju 88s for the loss of one Fulmar forced to land aboard the carrier and another forced to ditch. At 13:10 a formation of Junkers Ju 87 Stuka dive bombers was spotted from II./StG 2; based in Cyrenaica; they were searching for supply ships bound for Tobruk and not involved in the Battle of Crete. They hit Formidable with two 1,000 kg (2,200 lb) bombs and blew the bow off her escorting destroyer Nubian. The bombs killed 12 men and wounded 10; one bomb passed completely through the outer part of the starboard forward flight deck and detonated before it hit the water, riddling the side of the hull with holes. A near miss also blew a large hole in the ship's starboard side underwater. The pair of Fulmars on Combat Air Patrol (CAP) shot down one of the Stukas after it had dropped its bomb and were able to land aboard shortly afterwards but take-offs could not be made until 18:00.

Formidable arrived at Alexandria the following day and disembarked her air group. She received emergency repairs before departing on 24 July for permanent repairs at Norfolk Navy Yard in the United States, 829 Squadron flying aboard with its Albacores to provide anti-submarine patrols during the voyage. She arrived on 25 August, and the repairs were completed in early December. After several days of sea trials, she sailed for Britain in company with Illustrious on 12 December. During the night of 15/16 December, Illustrious collided with Formidable's stern, but neither ship was seriously damaged. She was repaired at Belfast from 21 December 1941 to 3 February 1942 and embarked the Albacores of 818 Squadron and 820 Squadron and the Grumman Martlet fighters of 888 Squadron.

=== Indian Ocean Raid ===
Formidable sailed on 17 February to join the Eastern Fleet in the Indian Ocean, escorting a convoy to Freetown, Sierra Leone, en route. One of her passengers on the voyage was Admiral Sir James Somerville, about to take up his appointment as Commander-in-Chief of the Eastern Fleet. The ship arrived at Colombo, Ceylon, on 24 March and Somerville hoisted his flag aboard the battleship Warspite that same day. Two days after Formidable's arrival, the Japanese First Air Fleet departed from Celebes (Sulawesi) in the Dutch East Indies to attack British forces in the Indian Ocean. Somerville was notified that the Japanese were planning to attack Ceylon on 28 March and ordered his fleet to assemble southeast of the island on 30 March to intercept them. Force A, consisting of Formidable, her sister Indomitable and Warspite, was ordered to Addu Atoll to refuel on 3 April after the Japanese failed to attack as the British expected. A Royal Air Force (RAF) Consolidated Catalina flying boat spotted them within range of Ceylon just three and a half hours after Force A arrived at the atoll on 4 April. Too far away to intercept them before they could attack Ceylon, Force A departed about eleven hours after arrival on a course that Somerville thought would allow him to attack by night while avoiding detection during the day. One of Indomitable's Albacores spotted some of the Japanese carriers just before nightfall on 5 April, after the Japanese attacked Colombo, but further searches failed to locate them until 8 April when the Japanese were one day away from their intended target, Trincomalee, and still too far away to intercept. Force A refuelled at Addu Atoll on 9 April and was then ordered to Bombay to calm fears of a Japanese attack on India's west coast.

Somerville was still uneasy about the possibility of another attack on Ceylon and ordered Force A to Kilindini Harbour, Mombasa, Kenya, on 24 April. En route (5–7 May), Force A helped protect the invasion of Vichy Diego Suarez, Madagascar, against a Japanese attack. Formidable arrived at Kilindini on 10 May and remained there until she departed on 29 May bound for Colombo. The ship alternated between Colombo and Kilindini for the rest of her time with the Eastern Fleet. During this time she took part in Operation Stab, a decoy invasion of the Andaman Islands, with Illustrious. Rear-Admiral Denis Boyd hoisted his flag over the ship on 24 August and she departed six days later to return home for a refit. She arrived at Rosyth on 21 September and her refit lasted until 18 October. She sailed that day for Scapa Flow where she embarked 24 Martlets of 888 and 893 Squadrons, 12 Albacores of 820 Squadron and 6 Supermarine Seafire fighters of 885 Squadron in preparation for the invasion of French North Africa.

=== Operation Torch ===
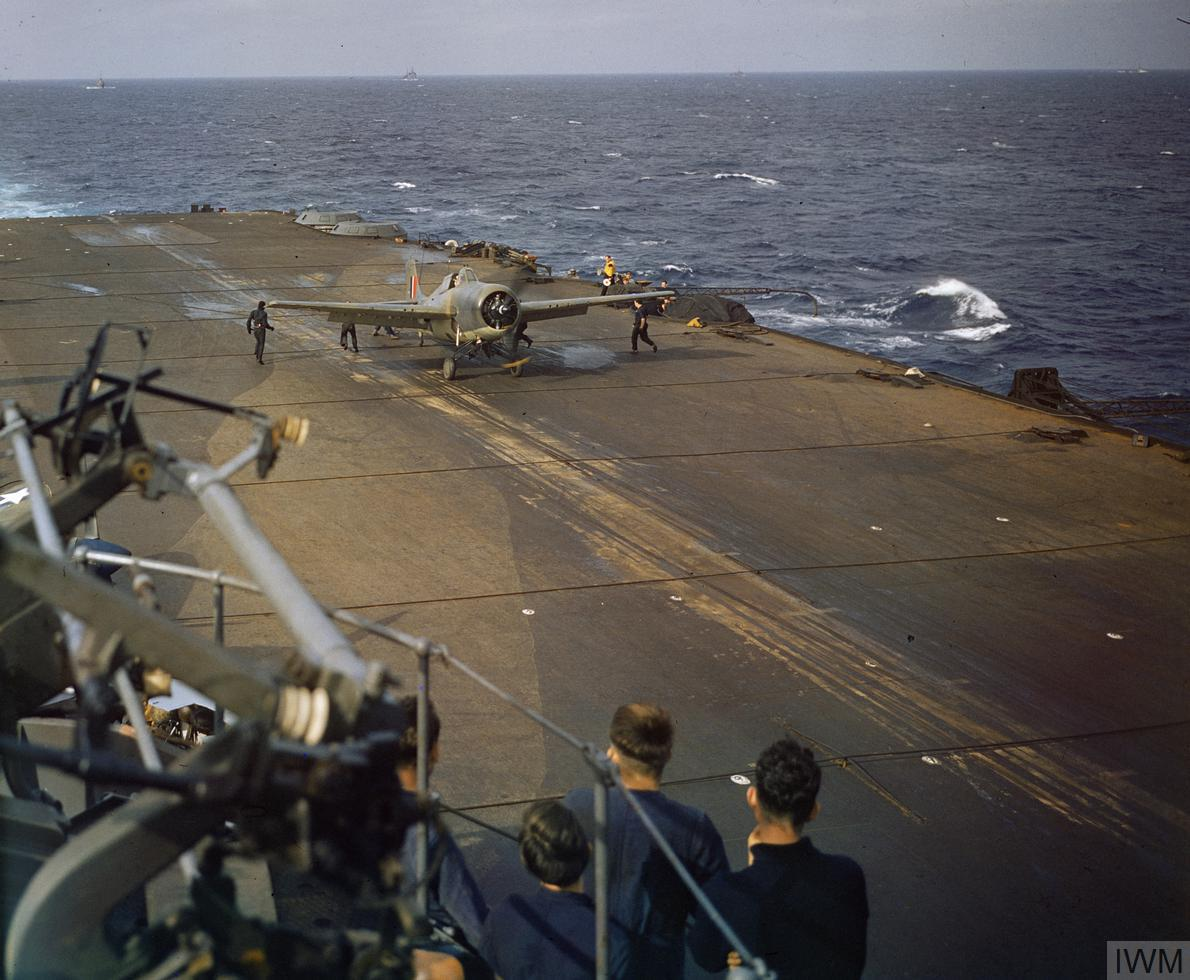
A Martlet on the flight deck, November 1942

Assigned to Force H for Operation Torch, Formidable sailed on 30 October and provided cover in the Western Mediterranean against any attempt to interfere with the landings by Axis forces in Italy or France. Her Martlets shot down a pair of Ju 88s on 6 November and her Albacores laid a smoke screen in support of the landings at Algiers on 8 November. Two of her Albacores torpedoed and sank the German submarine U-331 on 17 November, after it had surrendered to a Supermarine Walrus amphibious aircraft which then departed the scene. She remained off the Algerian coast providing air support for Allied forces for the rest of the month, and one of her Seafires shot down a Ju 88 on 28 November.

Formidable was the only carrier in the Mediterranean after Torch until she was joined by Indomitable in mid-June 1943 as part of the buildup for the Allied invasion of Sicily (Operation Husky). The two carriers were east of the island in a position to intercept any attempt by the Italian fleet to attack the landings. After Sicily was secured, Formidable became the first carrier to enter Grand Harbour, Malta, since Illustrious in January 1941. The latter ship joined Formidable as a replacement for the torpedoed Indomitable in Force H for the landings at Salerno (Operation Avalanche) on 9 September. As in Husky, their role was to protect the invasion fleet from interference by the Italian Navy. (Note: The Italians surrendered as the Allies landed and their fleet was interned at Malta.) The fighters aboard the smaller carriers protecting the forces ashore suffered heavy attrition during the early days of the operation and Formidable transferred 2 Seafires and 15 Martlets to Unicorn as replacements for their losses.

=== Norwegian operations ===
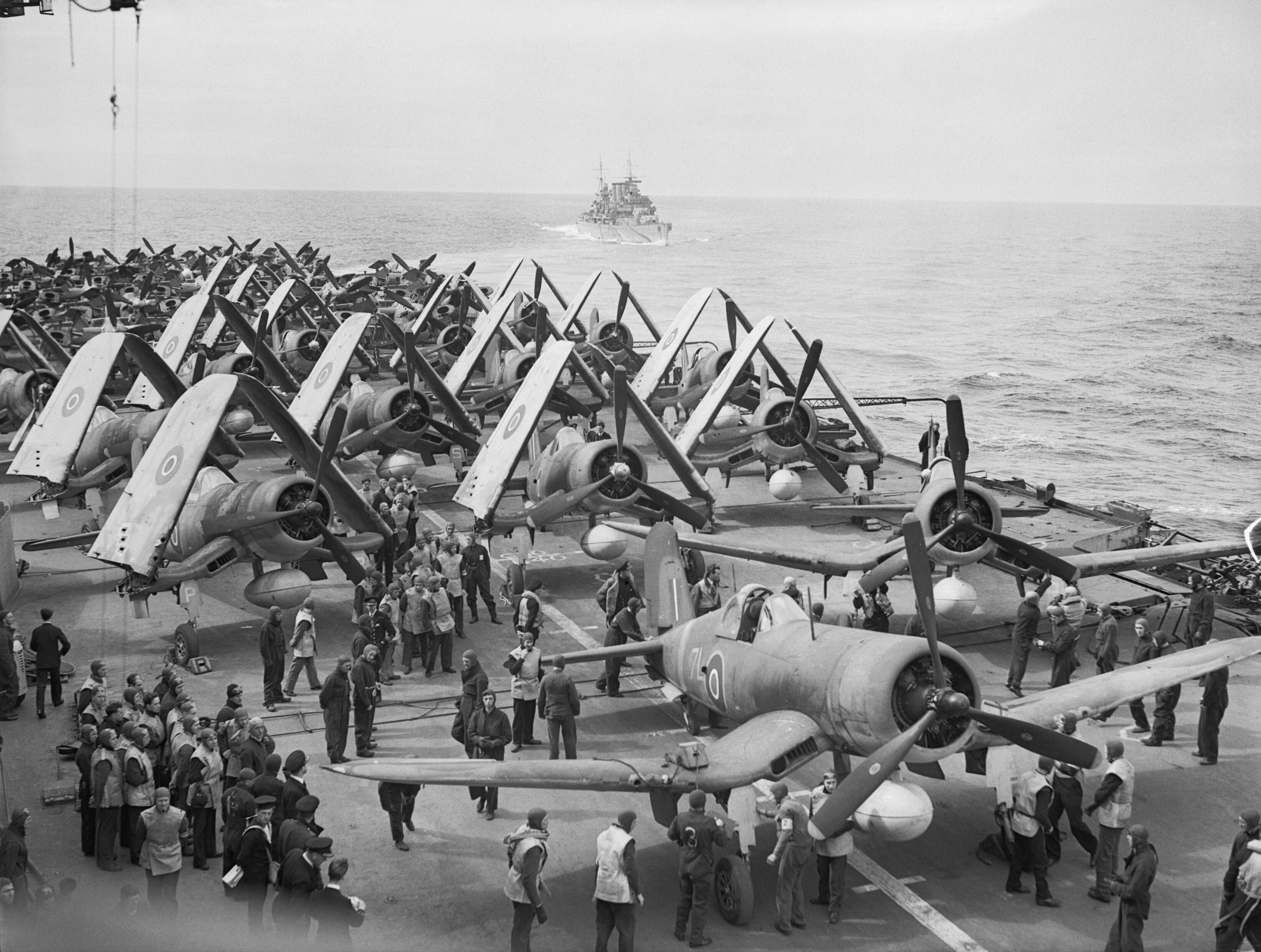
Corsairs and Fairey Barracudas on deck, July 1944

In October, the carrier was transferred to the Home Fleet and departed Gibraltar for Greenock on 13 October together with the battleship King George V. Six days later she was in Scapa Flow to begin patrols to Iceland in company with the battleships Howe and Anson and the American carrier Ranger that lasted for the next three weeks. On 13 November she flew off her air group and sailed for Belfast to begin a lengthy refit, arriving on 19 November. The refit was completed in early June and the ship spent the rest of the month working up. The 18 Corsairs of 1841 Squadron and the 24 Fairey Barracuda torpedo bombers of 827 Squadron and 830 Squadrons flew aboard on 29 June and Formidable sailed for Scapa Flow to train with the carriers Furious and Indefatigable before launching an attack on the Tirpitz in Kaafjord on 17 July (Operation Mascot). Her Corsairs escorted the strike aircraft from the other carriers to the target; one was shot down by German flak. A smoke screen prevented most of the Barracudas from seeing their target and they failed to hit the Tirpitz. Upon the ship's return to Scapa Flow, 827 and 830 Squadrons were replaced by 826 and 828 Squadrons, also flying Barracudas.

Formidable's air group was reinforced by a dozen Corsairs of 1842 Squadron on 7 August in preparation for further attacks on Tirpitz (Operation Goodwood). The two Corsair squadrons were assigned to No. 6 Naval Fighter Wing aboard the carrier on 14 August. The first attack was on the morning of 22 August when Formidable launched 24 Corsairs and 12 Barracudas against the German battleship and nearby targets, all of which returned. A smoke screen again protected the Tirpitz and no damage was inflicted. Another attack scheduled for the afternoon had to be cancelled because of low clouds. A further attack could not be mounted until 24 August because of bad weather. The carrier contributed 23 Corsairs and 16 Barracudas, and 3 of the fighters were shot down over the target. The Tirpitz was lightly damaged by two bomb hits during this attack. A final attack was made five days later, again without effect.

The carrier arrived at Scapa Flow on 2 September where both Barracuda squadrons disembarked. She later sailed to Gibraltar, arriving on 21 September to begin a refit that, among other things, augmented her anti-aircraft outfit in preparation for operations in the Pacific. The Corsairs of No. 6 Naval Fighter Wing flew aboard on 1 January 1945, as did 18 Grumman TBF Avengers of 848 Squadron. After several weeks of working up, Formidable departed Gibraltar on 14 January to join the British Pacific Fleet (BPF). She arrived in Sydney, the BPF's main base, on 10 March after several stops en route to refuel and embark stores and ammunition. On 20 March, Admiral Sir Bruce Fraser, commander of the BPF, inspected the ship and her crew.

=== Pacific operations ===
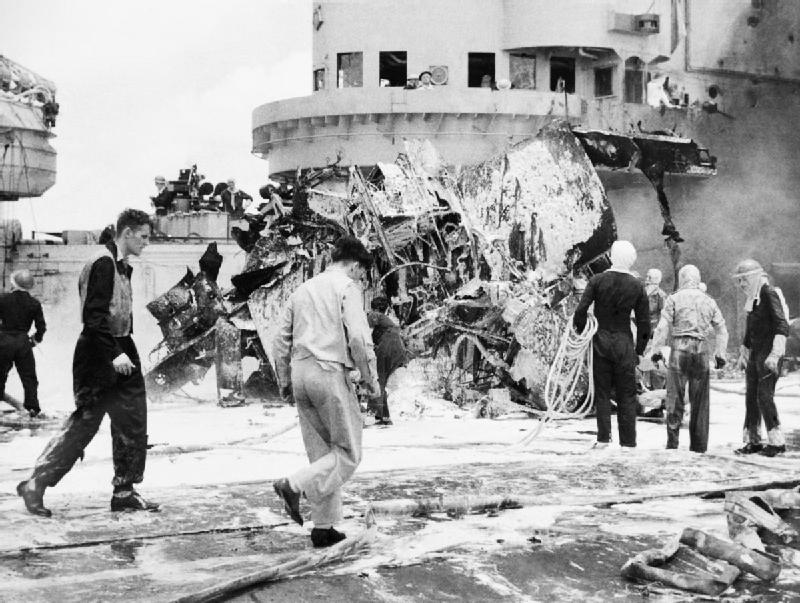
Aircraft wreckage after the kamikaze hit off Okinawa on 4 May 1945

By this time Formidable's air group had a strength of 36 Corsairs and 18 Avengers. She arrived in San Pedro Bay in the Philippines on 4 April to await the return of the BPF from their efforts to neutralise airfields on the Sakishima Islands, between Okinawa and Formosa, as part of the preparations for the landings on Okinawa. Formidable was called forward six days later to join the 1st Aircraft Carrier Squadron (1st ACS) of the BPF on operations as a replacement for Illustrious, which was in poor mechanical shape. She arrived on 14 April and contributed aircraft when the attacks recommenced two days later. The commander of 1842 Squadron was killed on the first day of operations while strafing buildings at Nobara airfield. After refuelling and two more days' attacks, the BPF sailed on 20 April for San Pedro Bay to replenish its ships for further operations.

The fleet returned to waters off Okinawa on 4 May and renewed its attacks on the airfields on the Sakishima Islands. Vice-Admiral Bernard Rawlings, second in command of the BPF, and his staff had determined that bombardment of Japanese gun positions by the heavy guns of battleships and cruisers might be a more effective method of destroying them than aerial attack. They detached King George V and Howe, as well as five cruisers, that morning to bombard Nobara and Hirara airfields of Miyako Island while fighters flew a protective CAP over them and spotted the fall of their shells. The loss of the most effective anti-aircraft ships was more important than anticipated and the Japanese were able to take advantage of the opportunity. The carrier had just launched two Corsairs for bombardment-spotting duties and the deck park of eleven Avengers was being moved forward to allow aircraft to land when an undetected Mitsubishi A6M Zero fighter attacked at 11:31. The Zero first strafed the flight deck before any of Formidable's guns could open fire and then turned sharply to dive into the forward flight deck despite the ship's hard turn to starboard. The fighter released a bomb shortly before it would have impacted the deck and was destroyed by the bomb's blast, although the remnants of the Zero struck Formidable.

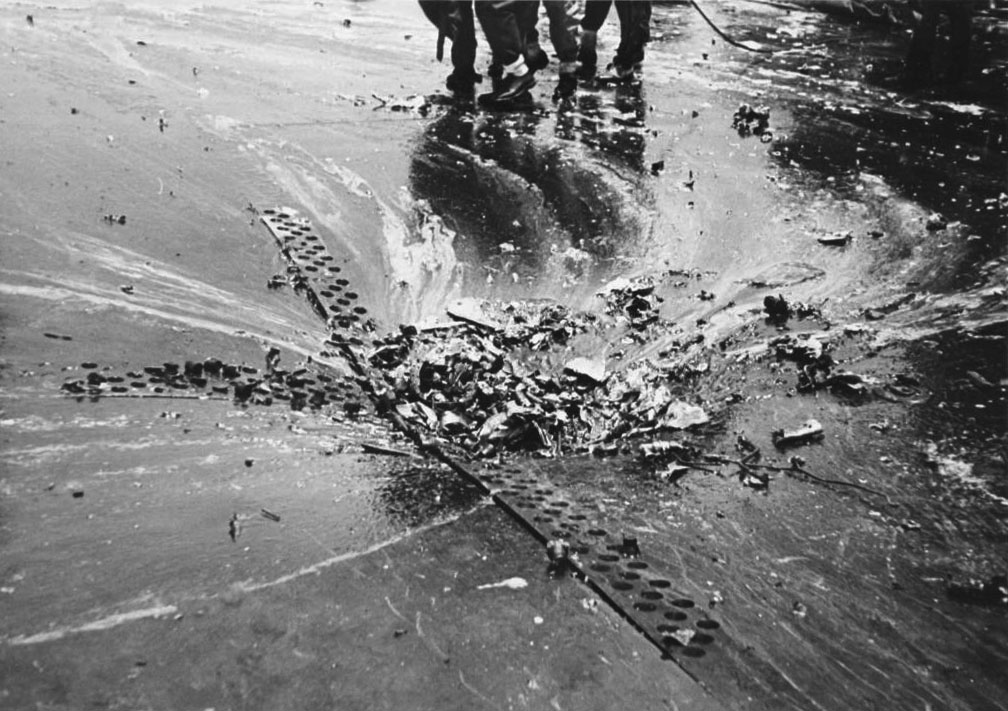
Dent in the flight deck of Formidable

The detonation of the bomb put a large dent in the flight deck, around 24 feet (7.3 m) by 20 feet (6.1 m) and 2 feet (0.61 m) deep, with a 2-square-foot (0.19 m^{2}) hole in the centre and much spalling from the underside. It killed 2 officers and 6 ratings, wounding 55 other crewmen. A fragment from the flight-deck armour penetrated the hangar-deck armour and passed through the centre-boiler uptakes, the centre-boiler room itself, and an oil tank before it came to rest in the inner bottom. The fragment severed the steam pipes in the centre-boiler room and forced its evacuation, cutting the ship's speed to 14 knots (26 km/h; 16 mph). The blast on the flight deck blew the Avenger closest to it over the side and set another one on fire. Shrapnel from the blast peppered the island, causing the bulk of the casualties, and severed many electrical cables, including those for most of the ship's radars. The fires on the flight deck and in the hangar were extinguished by 11:55, and seven Avengers and a Corsair which were damaged beyond repair were dumped over the side. The bomb struck at the intersection of three armour plates and dented the plates over an area 20 by 24 feet (6.1 by 7.3 m). The dent was filled by wood and concrete and covered by thin steel plates tack-welded to the deck so that she was able to operate aircraft by 17:00 and steam at a speed of 24 knots (44 km/h; 28 mph). Thirteen of her Corsairs had been airborne at the time of the attack and they operated from the other carriers for a time. The damage to the boiler room and its steam pipes was repaired so that the centre boilers could be reconnected to the engines at 02:00 the next day.

Crew of HMS Formidable in 1944

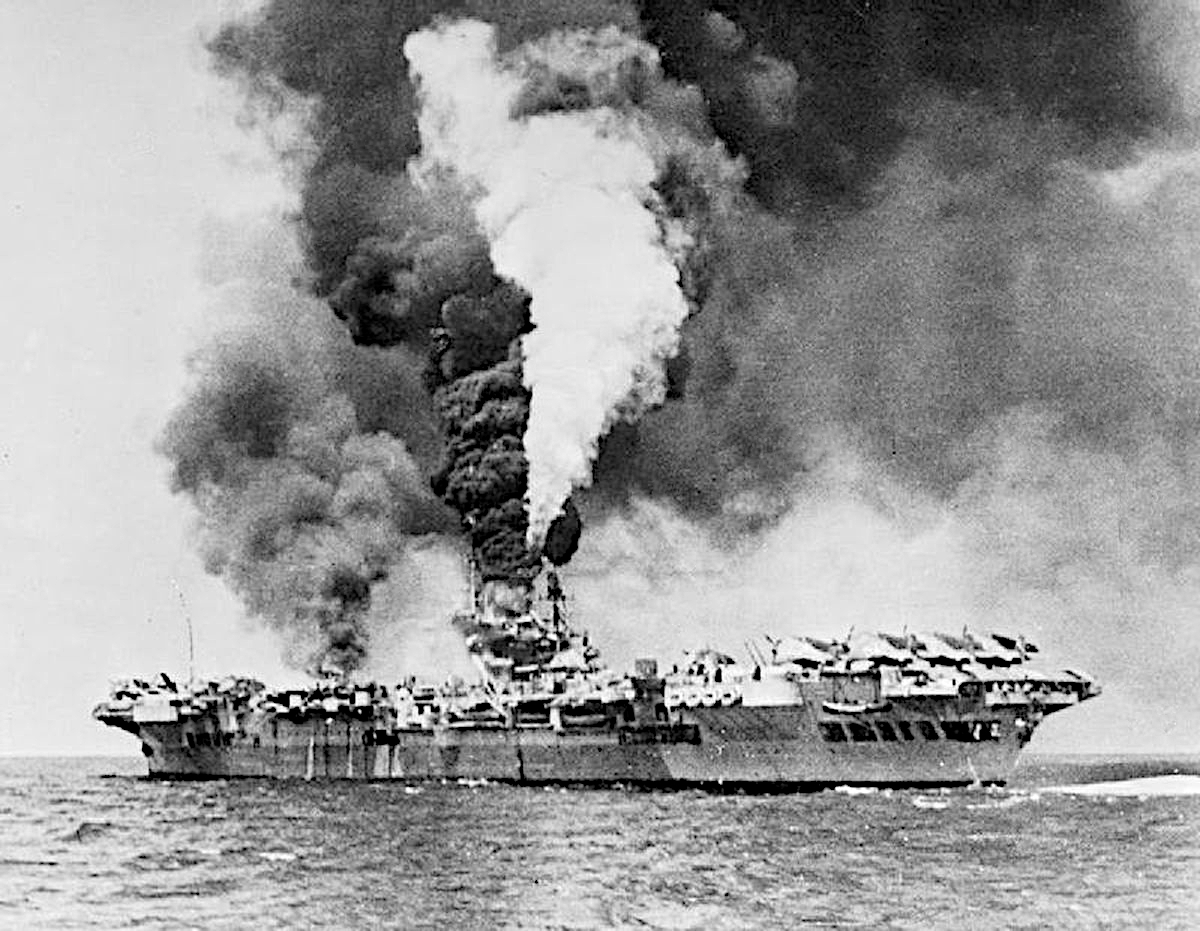
Formidable on fire after the kamikaze hit on 4 May

The bombardment significantly reduced Japanese aerial activity on 5 May, although several of Formidable's Corsairs, temporarily operating from her sister Victorious, shot down a Japanese reconnaissance aircraft at an altitude of 30,000 feet (9,100 m). That evening the fleet withdrew to refuel and was back on station on 8 May although heavy rains forced the cancellation of the planned air strikes. On 9 May, another kamikaze pilot, Yoshinari Kurose, penetrated the CAP at low altitude and crashed his plane into Formidable's flight deck and deck park at 17:05. The impact did little damage to the ship, but caused an explosion and large fire that destroyed 18 of her aircraft. One crewman, Petty Officer George Hinkins, was killed and four were wounded. The carrier was able to resume operations fifty minutes later, but with only four Avengers and eleven Corsairs still serviceable. Rawlings decided to immediately withdraw to give Victorious and Formidable more time to make repairs and to replenish their depleted air groups. He also revised the deployment of the BPF to counter the new low-level tactics of the Japanese by stationing the battleships and cruisers closer to the carriers, keeping the carriers closer together, and positioning radar-picket cruisers in the most likely directions of attack.

The BPF returned to action on 12 May and no Japanese aircraft were seen or detected that day or the next. One of Formidable's Avengers made a successful landing aboard Indomitable with only one landing gear leg extended and no flaps on 13 May. The BPF continued its routine of two days of operations alternating with one or two days to replenish its ships for the next several days with minimal interference by the Japanese. On the morning of 18 May, armourers were loading ammunition into aircraft when a Corsair's guns were accidentally fired into an Avenger, which caught fire. The overhead fire sprinklers were immediately turned on, but the fire could not be extinguished for nearly an hour, not least because the electric motors driving the steel-fire curtains had been damaged in the first kamikaze attack and could only be repaired by a dockyard. Twenty-one Corsairs and seven Avengers were either damaged or destroyed in the incident. Rawlings decided to detach Formidable early to give her extra time for repairs in Sydney and she was ordered to depart on 22 May.

==== Operations off the Japanese coast ====
The ship arrived on 31 May and was taken into the Captain Cook Dock at the Garden Island Dockyard for repairs, with the dock's labour force being augmented with workers from the Cockatoo Island Dockyard. Two of the three armour plates damaged on 4 May were repaired, but the third had to be replaced by two 1.5-inch high-quality steel plates as there were not any armour plates of the required thickness available in Australia. Repairs were also made to the ship's machinery, boilers and electrical systems. The island was enlarged with an admiral's staff cabin and a radar workshop. Rear-Admiral Sir Philip Vian, commander of the 1st ACS, transferred his flag to Formidable when her repairs were complete.

Together with Victorious and King George V, Formidable departed Sydney on 28 June, bound for the BPF's advance base at Manus Island, in the Admiralty Islands. Her air group now consisted of 36 Corsairs, 12 Avengers and 6 Grumman F6F Hellcats of 1844 Squadron. Two of the latter aircraft were photoreconnaissance versions. No. 6 Naval Fighter Wing was absorbed into the 2nd Carrier Air Group that controlled all of the aircraft on the carrier. The ships arrived on 4 July, refuelled, and departed two days later to join the American Third Fleet, already operating off the Japanese Home Islands. The BPF rendezvoused with the Americans on 16 July and commenced operations the next morning. Formidable flew off 28 Corsairs bound north of Tokyo on 17 July, but some of them were unable to locate their targets because of bad weather. Twenty-four Corsairs attacked targets near Tokyo the next day, before more bad weather halted flying operations until 24–25 July, when the BPF's aircraft attacked targets near Osaka and the Inland Sea, crippling the escort carrier Kaiyo. After replenishing, airstrikes resumed on 28 and 30 July, sinking the escort Okinawa near Maizuru. A combination of bad weather, refuelling requirements and the atomic bombing of Hiroshima delayed the resumption of air operations until 9 August.

During the morning, Formidable flew off a fighter sweep of a dozen Corsairs followed an hour later by Avengers that attacked Matsushima Air Field. A second fighter sweep, led by Lieutenant Robert Hampton Gray, RCNVR, senior pilot of 1841 Squadron, was diverted to attack Japanese warships located in Onagawa Wan, Miyagi Prefecture, with his eight Corsairs. Gray spotted two escort ships and led his aircraft into the attack. Intense flak set his engine on fire, but Gray continued his attack, skip bombing a 500-pound (230 kg) bomb into the Etorofu-class escort Amakusa. The ship sank within five minutes with the loss of 157 lives. Gray's aircraft rolled inverted shortly after releasing the bomb and crashed into the sea; he did not survive. Gray was later posthumously awarded the Victoria Cross (VC).

The attacks were repeated the next day, sinking two warships and numerous small merchantmen and destroying numerous railway locomotives and parked aircraft. The BPF had been scheduled to withdraw after 10 August to prepare for Operation Olympic, the invasion of Kyushu scheduled for November, and the bulk of the force, including Formidable, departed for Manus on 12 August. The Japanese surrender a few days later ended the war.

=== Post-war actions ===
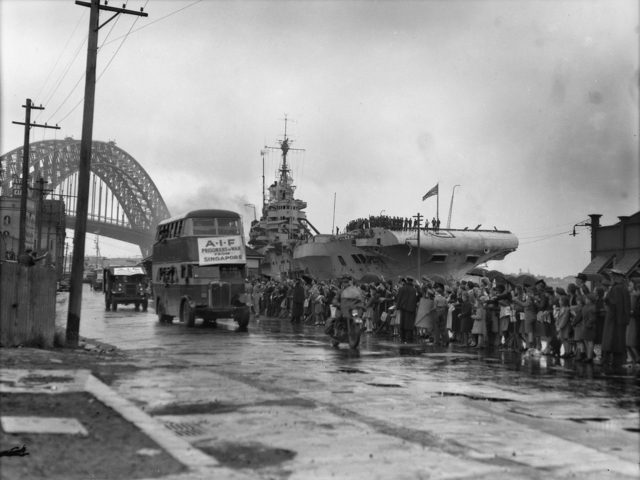
Friends and relatives of repatriated Australian POWs wave them off as they depart in buses after disembarking from Formidable at Sydney in October 1945

Formidable arrived at Sydney on 24 August, and had her hangar refitted to accommodate Allied ex-prisoners of war and soldiers for repatriation. Having left her air group behind to maximise the numbers of passengers she could carry, the ship arrived at Manila on 30 September, where she loaded over 1,000 Australian former prisoners of war on 4 October and unloaded them at Circular Quay in Sydney on 21 October. She departed three days later, bound for Karavia Bay, New Britain, where she loaded 1,254 men of the Indian Army and continued on to Singapore where she loaded Indian ex-PoWs before delivering them to Bombay. There Formidable loaded an Indian Army infantry battalion for transport to Batavia in the Dutch East Indies to maintain law and order until Dutch colonial troops could take over. The ship then loaded elements of the 7th Australian Division and their equipment at Tarakan Island, Borneo, and picked up more Australians at Morotai; she arrived at Sydney on 6 December.

Vice-Admiral Vian addressed the ship's crew on 27 December before she departed the following day with 800 naval personnel embarked for passage home. She arrived at Portsmouth on 5 February 1946. The dockyard there fitted her with more permanent accommodations in the hangar for more trooping duties and she loaded 480 personnel before departing for Sydney on 2 March. Formidable arrived there a month later and loaded 1,336 naval personnel as well as some Wrens and VAD nurses. She sailed on 12 April, stopping in Colombo to refuel and drop off 576 naval personnel, before arriving in Devonport on 9 May. She made her next voyage to Bombay and Colombo between 15 June and 25 July. The ship loaded 114 officers, 958 ratings and 11 VAD nurses in Singapore in August and another 319 ratings in Trincomalee before stopping in Malta to load 41 men of the Merchant Navy. Formidable made her last trooping voyage between Portsmouth and Singapore, delivering 1,000 Royal Marine Commandos to the latter, between 3 December and 3 February 1947.

=== Decommissioning and disposal ===
In early March 1947, Formidable steamed north to Rosyth for a brief refit before being reduced to reserve. She was paid off on 12 August and a later survey revealed that her wartime damage and poor material shape meant the ship was beyond economical repair at a time when money was very tight. She was towed to Spithead in mid-1949 and then to Portsmouth Royal Dockyard in November 1952. Formidable was sold for scrap in January 1953 and towed to Inverkeithing where she was broken up.

== Squadrons embarked ==
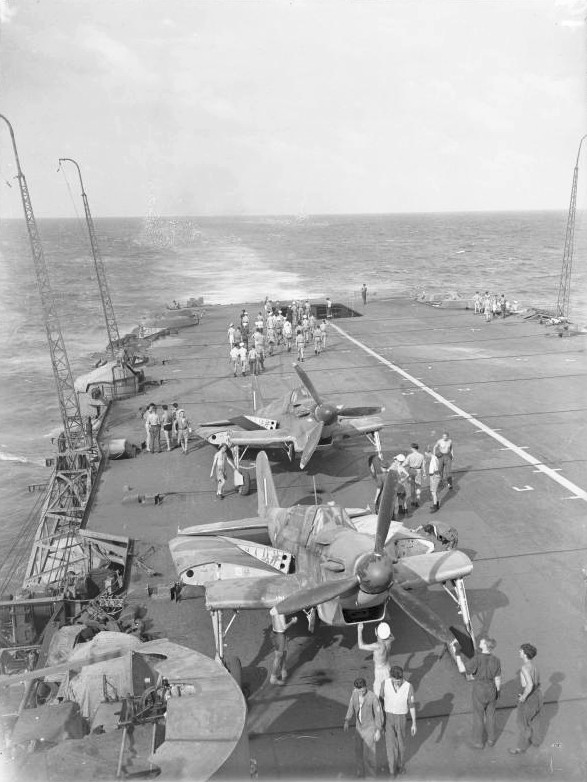
Fulmars on the flight deck, May 1942

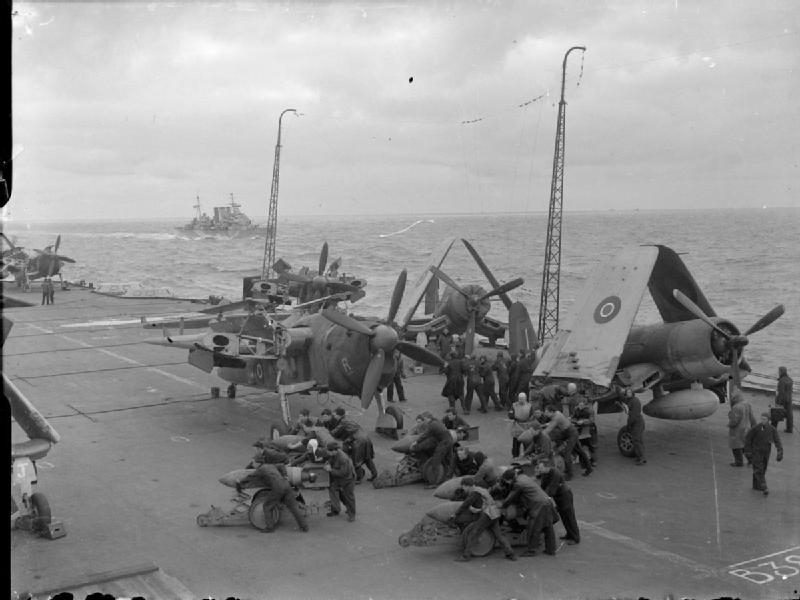
Barracudas being "bombed-up", during Operation Goodwood in August 1944. The heavy cruiser Berwick is in the background.

| Squadron | Aircraft operated | Embarked (from – to) | Notes |
|---|---|---|---|
| 803 | Fairey Fulmar | 27 November 1940 – 12 May 1941; 25 April 1942 – 24 August 1942 | To HMS Illustrious |
| 806 | Fairey Fulmar | 4 March – 27 May 1942 | |
| 810 | Fairey Swordfish | 13–21 December 1941 | |
| 818 | Fairey Albacore | 4 February – 20 April 1942 | Disbanded |
| 820 | Fairey Albacore | 3 February 1942 – 11 November 1943 | Disbanded |
| 826 | Fairey Albacore; Fairey Swordfish; Fairey Barracuda | 26 November 1940 – 27 May 1941; 15 August – 2 September 1944 | |
| 827 | Fairey Barracuda | 11–19 July 1944 | Returned to HMS Furious |
| 828 | Fairey Barracuda | 18 August – 2 September 1944 | Returned to HMS Implacable |
| 829 | Fairey Albacore | 15 November 1940 – 23 August 1941; 10–21 December 1941 | |
| 830 | Fairey Barracuda | 9–19 July 1944 | Returned to HMS Furious |
| 841 | Fairey Barracuda | 8–14 August 1944 | Transferred to HMS Implacable |
| 848 | Grumman TBF Avenger | 16 September 1944 – 24 August 1945 | |
| 853 | Grumman F4F Wildcat | 14–24 June 1944 | |
| 881 | Grumman F4F Wildcat | 10–12 November 1943 | |
| 885 | Supermarine Seafire I/II | 28 October 1942 – 18 October 1943 | |
| 888 | Grumman F4F Wildcat | 24 August 1942 – 13 November 1943 | |
| 893 | Grumman F4F Wildcat | 21 October 1942 – 13 November 1943 | Disbanded |
| 1840 | Grumman F6F Hellcat | 31 July – 5 August 1944 | Transferred to HMS Indefatigable |
| 1841 | Vought F4U Corsair | 26 June 1944 – 23 August 1945 | |
| 1842 | Vought F4U Corsair | 28 June 1945 – ? | 2 of these were photoreconnaissance versions |

== Bibliography ==
- Ballantyne, Iain (2001). Warspite. Warships of the Royal Navy. Naval Institute Press. ISBN 1-55750-988-3.
- Brown, David (1977). WWII Fact Files: Aircraft Carriers. New York: Arco Publishing. ISBN 0-668-04164-1.
- Brown, J. D. (2009). Carrier Operations in World War II. Annapolis, Maryland: Naval Institute Press. ISBN 978-1-59114-108-2.
- Campbell, John (1985). Naval Weapons of World War II. Annapolis, Maryland: Naval Institute Press. ISBN 0-87021-459-4.
- Campbell, N. J. M. (1980). "Great Britain". In Chesneau, Roger (ed.). Conway's All the World's Fighting Ships 1922–1946. New York: Mayflower Books. pp. 2–85. ISBN 0-8317-0303-2.
- Friedman, Norman (1988). British Carrier Aviation: The Evolution of the Ships and Their Aircraft. Annapolis, Maryland: Naval Institute Press. ISBN 0-87021-054-8.
- Garzke, William H. & Dulin, Robert O. (1985). Battleships: Axis and Neutral Battleships in World War II. Annapolis, Maryland: Naval Institute Press. ISBN 978-0-87021-101-0.
- Greene, Jack; Massignani, Alessandro (1998). The Naval War in the Mediterranean, 1940–1943. London: Chatham Publishing. ISBN 1-86176-057-4.
- Hobbs, David (2013). British Aircraft Carriers: Design, Development and Service Histories. Barnsley, UK: Seaforth Publishing. ISBN 978-1-84832-138-0.
- Hobbs, David (2011). The British Pacific Fleet: The Royal Navy's Most Powerful Strike Force. Annapolis, Maryland: Naval Institute Press. ISBN 978-1-59114-044-3.
- Hobbs, David (2017). The British Pacific Fleet: The Royal Navy's Most Powerful Strike Force. Barnsley, UK: Seaforth Publishing. ISBN 978-1-5267-0283-8.
- Lenton, H. T. (1998). British & Empire Warships of the Second World War. Annapolis, Maryland: Naval Institute Press. ISBN 1-55750-048-7.
- McCart, Neil (2000). The Illustrious & Implacable Classes of Aircraft Carrier 1940–1969. Cheltenham, UK: Fan Publications. ISBN 1-901225-04-6.
- Rohwer, Jürgen (2005). Chronology of the War at Sea 1939-1945: The Naval History of World War Two (Third Rev ed.). Annapolis, Maryland: Naval Institute Press. ISBN 1-59114-119-2.
- H.M. Ships Damaged or Sunk by Enemy Action: 3rd. SEPT. 1939 to 2nd. SEPT. 1945. Admiralty. 1952.
- Shores, Christopher (1996). Dust Clouds in the Middle East. London: Grub Street. ISBN 1-898697-37-X.
- Shores, Christopher; Cull, Brian & Malizia, Nicola (1987). Air War for Yugoslavia, Greece, and Crete. London: Grub Street. ISBN 0-948817-07-0.
- Sturtivant, Ray (1984). The Squadrons of the Fleet Air Arm. Tonbridge, UK: Air-Britain (Historians). ISBN 0-85130-120-7.
