= German submarine U-711 =

German World War II submarine

History

Nazi Germany
- Name: U-711
- Ordered: 7 December 1940
- Builder: H. C. Stülcken Sohn, Hamburg
- Yard number: 777
- Laid down: 31 July 1941
- Launched: 25 June 1942
- Commissioned: 26 September 1942
- Fate: Sunk on 4 May 1945

General characteristics
- Class & type: Type VIIC submarine
- Displacement: 769 tonnes (757 long tons) surfaced; 871 t (857 long tons) submerged
- Length: 67.10 m (220 ft 2 in) o/a; 50.50 m (165 ft 8 in) pressure hull
- Beam: 6.20 m (20 ft 4 in) o/a; 4.70 m (15 ft 5 in) pressure hull
- Height: 9.60 m (31 ft 6 in)
- Draught: 4.74 m (15 ft 7 in)
- Installed power: 2,800–3,200 PS (2,100–2,400 kW; 2,800–3,200 bhp) (diesels); 750 PS (550 kW; 740 shp) (electric)
- Propulsion: 2 shafts; 2 × diesel engines; 2 × electric motors
- Speed: 17.7 knots (32.8 km/h; 20.4 mph) surfaced; 7.6 knots (14.1 km/h; 8.7 mph) submerged
- Range: 8,500 nautical miles (15,700 km; 9,800 mi) at 10 knots (19 km/h; 12 mph)
- Test depth: 230 m (750 ft); Crush depth: 250–295 m (820–968 ft)
- Complement: 44–60 officers & ratings
- Armament: 5 × 53.3 cm (21 in) torpedo tubes (four bow, one stern); 14 × torpedoes; 1 × 8.8 cm (3.46 in) deck gun (220 rounds); 2 × twin 2 cm (0.79 in) C/30 anti-aircraft guns

Service record
- Part of: 5th U-boat Flotilla; 26 September 1942 – 31 March 1943; 11th U-boat Flotilla; 1 April – 31 May 1943; 13th U-boat Flotilla; 1 June 1943 – 4 May 1945
- Identification codes: M 50 659
- Commanders: Oblt.z.S. / Kptlt. Hans-Günther Lange; 26 September 1942 – 4 May 1945
- Operations: 12 patrols: 1st patrol: a. 25 March – 30 April 1943; b. 12 – 14 May 1943; 2nd patrol: 25 May – 18 June 1943; 3rd patrol: a. 22 July – 30 September 1943; b. 2 – 5 October 1943; c. 15 – 17 December 1943; d. 18 – 19 December 1943; e. 20 – 23 December 1943; f. 19 – 21 March 1944; 4th patrol: 22 March – 6 April 1944; 5th patrol: 11 – 15 April 1944; 6th patrol: 24 April – 5 May 1944; 7th patrol: a. 30 May – 8 July 1944; b. 29 – 30 July 1944; 8th patrol: a. 2 – 19 August 1944; b. 22 – 26 August 1944; c. 27 – 28 August 1944; d. 3 – 5 September 1944; 9th patrol: a. 7 September – 4 October 1944; b. 6 – 8 October 1944; c. 23 – 26 January 1945; 10th patrol: 9 – 24 February 1945; 11th patrol: 14 – 31 March 1945; 12th patrol: 15 April – 2 May 1945
- Victories: 1 merchant ship sunk (10 GRT); 1 warship sunk (925 tons); 1 auxiliary warship damaged (20 GRT)

German submarine U-711 was a Type VIIC U-boat of Nazi Germany's Kriegsmarine during World War II.

Ordered 7 December 1940, laid down, 31 July 1941 and launched 25 June 1942. She was commanded by Oberleutnant zur See Hans-Günther Lange (who was awarded the Knights Cross).

== Design ==
German Type VIIC submarines had a displacement of 769 tonnes (757 long tons) when at the surface and 871 tonnes (857 long tons) while submerged. U-711 had a total length of 67.10 m (220 ft 2 in), a pressure hull length of 50.50 m (165 ft 8 in), a beam of 6.20 m (20 ft 4 in), a height of 9.60 m (31 ft 6 in), and a draught of 4.74 m (15 ft 7 in). The submarine was powered by two Germaniawerft F46 four-stroke, six-cylinder supercharged diesel engines producing a total of 2,800 to 3,200 metric horsepower (2,060 to 2,350 kW; 2,760 to 3,160 shp) for use while surfaced, two AEG GU 460/8–27 double-acting electric motors producing a total of 750 metric horsepower (550 kW; 740 shp) for use while submerged. She had two shafts and two 1.23 m (4 ft) propellers. The boat was capable of operating at depths of up to 230 metres (750 ft).

The submarine had a maximum surface speed of 17.7 knots (32.8 km/h; 20.4 mph) and a maximum submerged speed of 7.6 knots (14.1 km/h; 8.7 mph). When submerged, the boat could operate for 80 nautical miles (150 km; 92 mi) at 4 knots (7.4 km/h; 4.6 mph); when surfaced, she could travel 8,500 nautical miles (15,700 km; 9,800 mi) at 10 knots (19 km/h; 12 mph). U-711 was fitted with five 53.3 cm (21 in) torpedo tubes (four fitted at the bow and one at the stern), fourteen torpedoes, one 8.8 cm (3.46 in) SK C/35 naval gun, 220 rounds, removed in the summer of 1944, when she was fitted with the schnorkeland and two, twin 2 cm (0.79 in) C/30 anti-aircraft guns. The boat had a complement of between forty-four and sixty.

== Service history ==
During her active service career, U-711 sank 2 ships and damaged a third.

U-711 attacked and sank the British corvette HMS Bluebell on 17 February 1945 with an acoustic homing torpedo, which caused her depth charges to explode. Bluebell sank in less than 30 seconds and from her crew of 86 there was only one survivor.

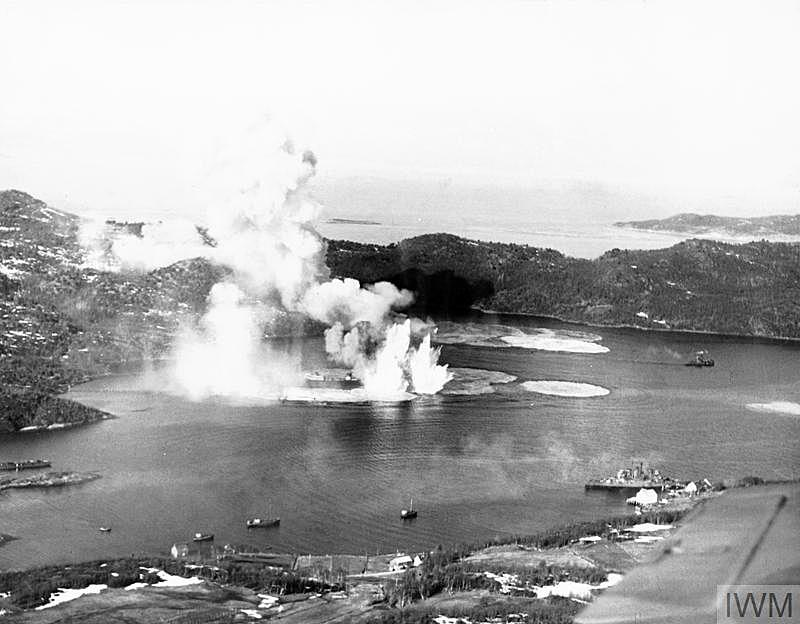
U-711 is just visible behind water columns, smoke and the depot ship Black Watch

=== Fate ===
On 4 May 1945, U-711 was sunk by aircraft of the Fleet Air Arm during Operation Judgement, an attack on the depot ships MS Black Watch and Senja anchored at Kilbotn, south of Harstad, Norway. This was the last air-raid of the war in Europe.

Avenger and Wildcat aircraft, from FAA Squadrons 846, 853 and 882, operating from the British escort carriers HMS Trumpeter, HMS Queen and HMS Searcher sank the Black Watch with 7 direct hits and 4 near misses. U-711, was moored alongside and was damaged but managed to sail away. The U-boat had a harbour crew of eight on board, including the captain, who all survived although forty of her crew who were berthed on the depot ship were killed. The submarine later sank at 68°48′N 16°38′E.

A few hours earlier Lange had received the signal from Germany ordering all U-boats to cease attacks on Allied shipping.

=== Wolfpacks ===
U-711 took part in nine wolfpacks, namely:

- Wiking (1 August – 20 September 1943)
- Blitz (24 March – 5 April 1944)
- Keil (11 – 14 April 1944)
- Donner & Keil (24 April – 3 May 1944)
- Grimm (31 May – 6 June 1944)
- Trutz (8 June – 7 July 1944)
- Greif (3 – 18 August 1944)
- Rasmus (9 – 13 February 1945)
- Hagen (15 – 21 March 1945)

== Summary of raiding history ==
Date	Ship Name	Nationality	Tonnage (Note: Merchant ship tonnages are in gross register tons. Military vessels are listed by tons displacement.)	Fate
13 April 1944	Solvoll	Norway	10	Sunk
17 February 1945	HMS Bluebell	Royal Navy	925	Sunk
22 March 1945	VPS-5	Soviet Navy	20	Damaged

== Dive site ==
As no-one was killed during her sinking, U-711's location is not classed as a war grave and is a well-documented dive-site, lying at approximately 50 meters depth and only having minor damage.

== Bibliography ==
- Busch, Rainer; Röll, Hans-Joachim (1999). German U-boat commanders of World War II : a biographical dictionary. Translated by Brooks, Geoffrey. London, Annapolis, Md: Greenhill Books, Naval Institute Press. ISBN 1-55750-186-6.
- Busch, Rainer; Röll, Hans-Joachim (1999). Deutsche U-Boot-Verluste von September 1939 bis Mai 1945 [German U-boat losses from September 1939 to May 1945]. Der U-Boot-Krieg (in German). Vol. IV. Hamburg, Berlin, Bonn: Mittler. ISBN 3-8132-0514-2.
- Gröner, Erich; Jung, Dieter; Maass, Martin (1991). German Warships 1815–1945, U-boats and Mine Warfare Vessels. Vol. 2. Translated by Thomas, Keith; Magowan, Rachel. London: Conway Maritime Press. ISBN 0-85177-593-4.
