= Sandtorg Church =

- Sandtorg kirke / Sørvik kirke
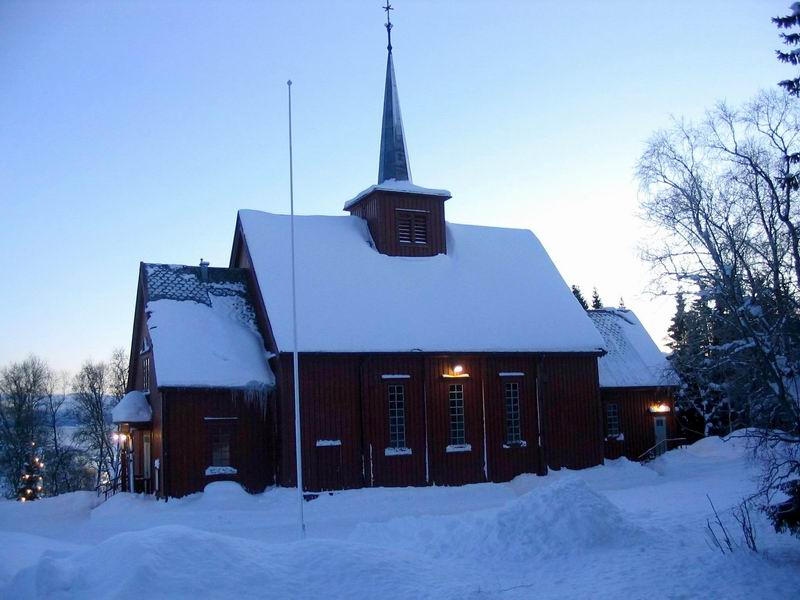
- View of the church
- Sandtorg Church
- 68.68341939°N 16.53153669°E
- Location: Harstad Municipality, Troms
- Country: Norway
- Denomination: Church of Norway
- Churchmanship: Evangelical Lutheran

History
- Status: Parish church
- Founded: 1933
- Consecrated: 13 July 1933

Architecture
- Functional status: Active
- Architect: Sigurd Bjørhovde
- Architectural type: Long church
- Style: Swiss chalet style
- Completed: 1933 (93 years ago)

Specifications
- Capacity: 250
- Materials: Wood

Administration
- Diocese: Nord-Hålogaland
- Deanery: Trondenes prosti
- Parish: Sandtorg
- Norwegian Cultural Heritage Site
- Type: Church
- Status: Listed
- ID: 85393

Sandtorg Church (Norwegian: Sandtorg kirke or Sørvik-kirka) is a parish church of the Church of Norway in Harstad Municipality in Troms county, Norway. It is located in the village of Sørvika on the east side of the island of Hinnøya. It is one of the churches for the Sandtorg parish which is part of the Trondenes prosti (deanery) in the Diocese of Nord-Hålogaland. The red, wooden church was built in a long church design and a Swiss chalet style in 1933 using plans drawn up by the architect Sigurd Bjørhovde. The church seats about 250 people.

== History ==
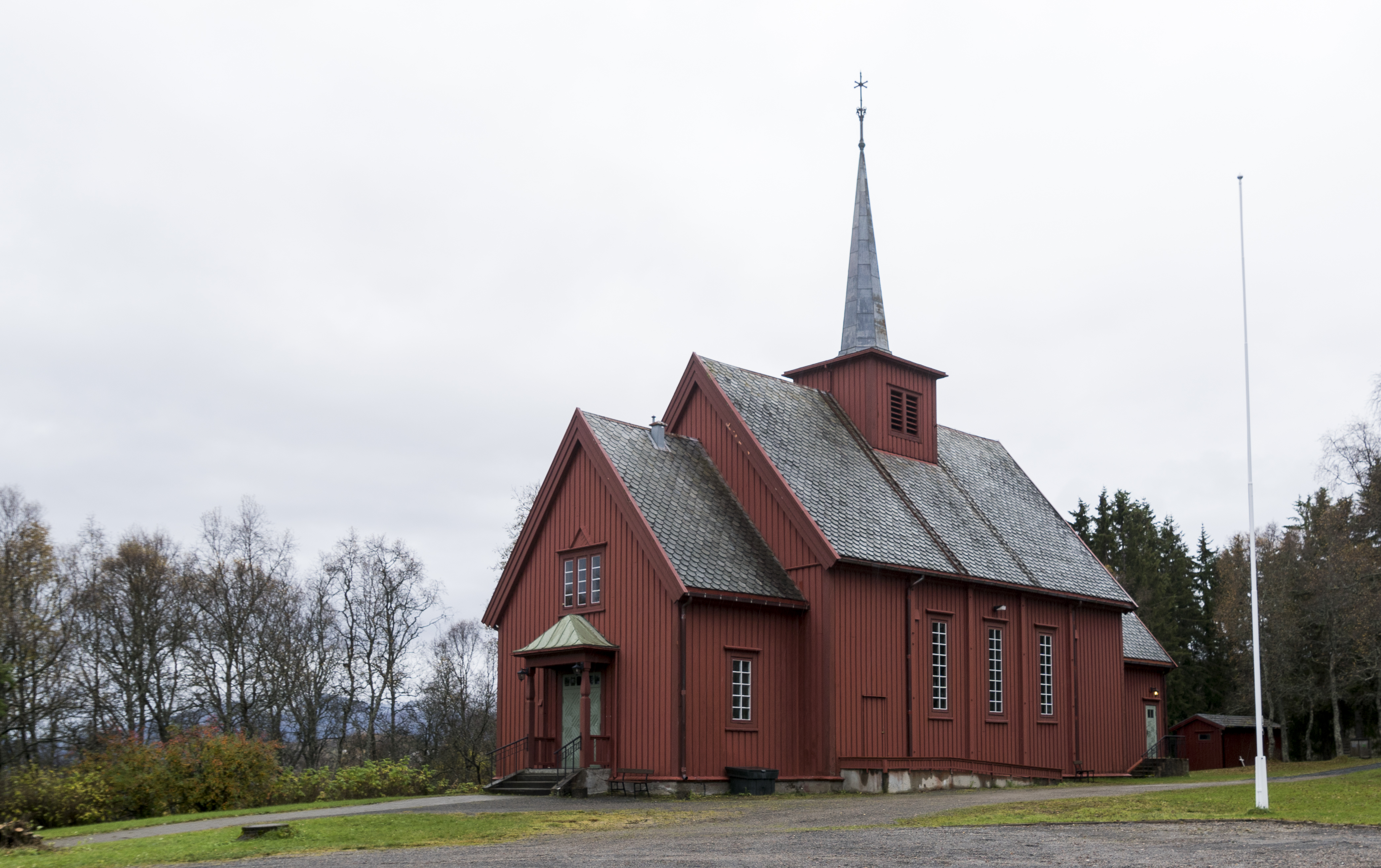
View of the church

The old Trondenes Municipality was long and the old Trondenes Church was located at the north end of the municipality, about 20 kilometres (12 mi) away. For many years, the people in the southern part of the municipality pushed for their own church. In 1918, the architect Sigurd Bjørhovde was hired to design a church by redesigning and enlarging an old meeting house that the municipality owned. The architect raised the roof of the old building and tried to use Swiss chalet style elements in the whole design. Due to hard economic times, the municipality did not have the funding until 1932. The church was completed in 1933 and it was consecrated on 13 July 1933 by the Bishop Eivind Berggrav.

== See also ==
- List of churches in Nord-Hålogaland
