= HMS Trumpeter (D09) =

1943 Ruler-class escort aircraft carrier

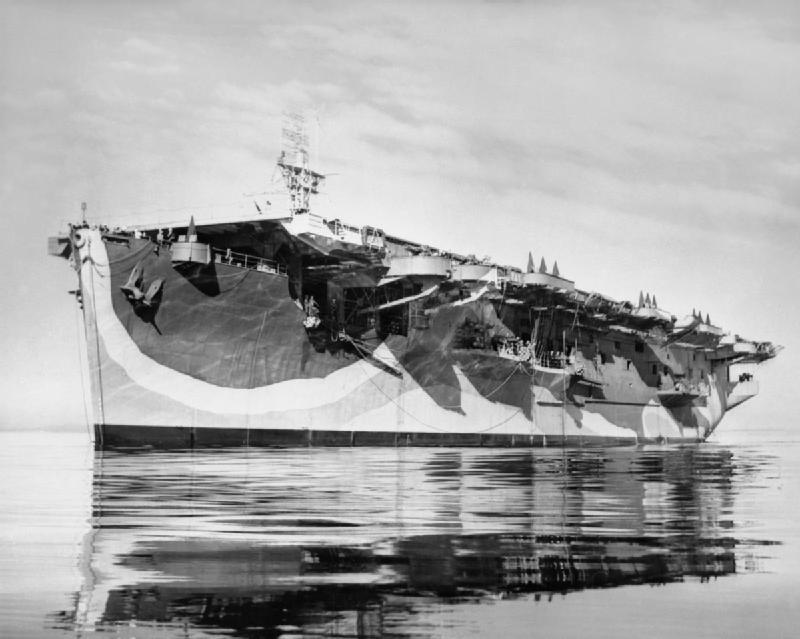
- HMS Trumpeter

History

United States
- Name: USS Bastian
- Namesake: Bastian Bay, Louisiana
- Builder: Seattle-Tacoma Shipbuilding Corporation
- Laid down: 25 August 1942
- Launched: 15 December 1942
- Fate: Transferred to Royal Navy

United Kingdom
- Name: HMS Trumpeter
- Commissioned: 4 August 1943
- Decommissioned: 19 June 1946
- Identification: Pennant number:D09
- Fate: Sold to the Netherlands

Netherlands
- Name: Alblasserdijk (1948–1953); Alblasserdyk (1953–1966)
- Owner: Holland America Line
- Operator: Holland America Line
- Acquired: 1948
- Out of service: 1966
- Fate: Sold to Panama in 1966

Panama
- Name: Irene Valmas
- Port of registry: Panama
- Acquired: 1966
- Out of service: 1971
- Fate: Scrapped in Spain in 1971

General characteristics
- Class & type: Bogue-class escort carrier (USA); Ruler-class escort carrier (UK)
- Displacement: 7,800 tons
- Length: 495 ft 7 in (151.05 m)
- Beam: 69 ft 6 in (21.18 m)
- Draught: 26 ft (7.9 m)
- Propulsion: Steam turbines, 1 shaft, 8,500 shp (6.3 MW)
- Speed: 18.5 knots (34.3 km/h)
- Complement: 890 officers and men
- Armament: 2 × 4"/50, 5"/38 or 5"/51 guns; 8 × twin 40 mm Bofors; 35 × single 20 mm Oerlikon
- Aircraft carried: 28

Service record

USS Bastian (CVE-37) (originally AVG-37 and then ACV-37) was a Bogue-class escort aircraft carrier built by Seattle-Tacoma Shipbuilding of Tacoma, Washington, laid down on 25 August 1942 and launched 15 December 1942. She was transferred to the United Kingdom, under Lend-Lease and commissioned on 4 August 1943 as the Ruler-class escort carrier HMS Trumpeter (D09).

On 4 May 1945 aircraft of 846 Naval Air Squadron flew from Trumpeter to take part in Operation Judgement, an attack on the U-boat depot at Kilbotn, Norway, contributing eight Grumman Avengers and four Grumman Wildcats to a 44-aircraft attack that destroyed several vessels including the depot ship "Black Watch" and U-711.

Trumpeter was returned to United States' custody 6 April 1946, stricken from the Naval Vessel Register 19 June 1946 and sold to the Holland America Line as Alblasserdijk (later renamed Irene Valmas). She was sold for scrap in Spain in 1971.

== Design and description ==
These ships were all larger and had a greater aircraft capacity than all the preceding American built escort carriers. They were also all laid down as escort carriers and not converted merchant ships. All the ships had a complement of 646 men and an overall length of 492 feet 3 inches (150.0 m), a beam of 69 feet 6 inches (21.2 m) and a draught of 25 ft 6 in (7.8 m). Propulsion was provided a steam turbine, two boilers connected to one shaft giving 9,350 brake horsepower (SHP), which could propel the ship at 16.5 knots (30.6 km/h; 19.0 mph).

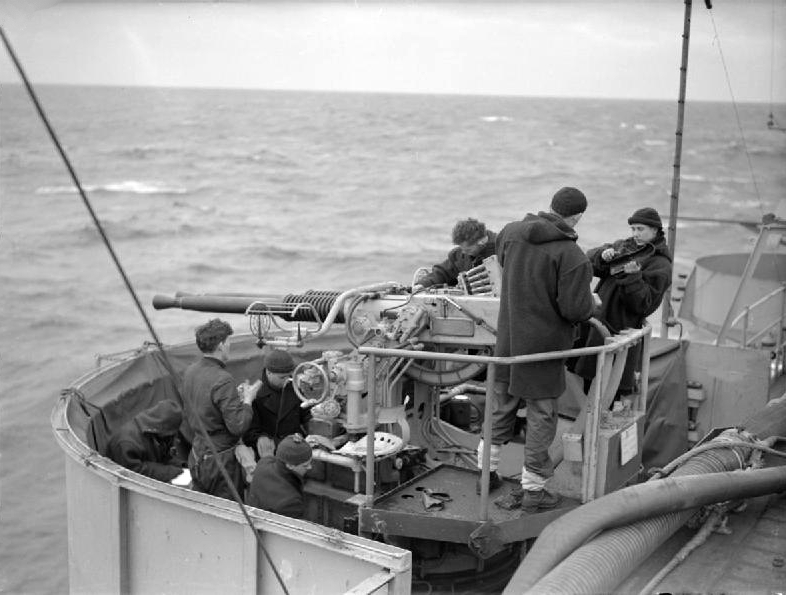
Twin 40 mm Bofors anti-aircraft gun.

Aircraft facilities were a small combined bridge–flight control on the starboard side, two aircraft lifts 43 feet (13.1 m) by 34 feet (10.4 m), one aircraft catapult and nine arrestor wires. Aircraft could be housed in the 260 feet (79.2 m) by 62 feet (18.9 m) hangar below the flight deck. Armament comprised: two 4"/50, 5"/38 or 5"/51 Dual Purpose guns in single mounts, sixteen 40 mm Bofors anti-aircraft guns in twin mounts and twenty 20 mm Oerlikon anti-aircraft cannons in single mounts. They had a maximum aircraft capacity of twenty-four aircraft which could be a mixture of Grumman Martlet, Vought F4U Corsair or Hawker Sea Hurricane fighter aircraft and Fairey Swordfish or Grumman Avenger anti-submarine aircraft.
