= Sørvika =

Village in Harstad Municipality, Norway

Sørvika Sørvik
- Village
- View of the village
- Interactive map of Sørvika
- Location within Troms Location within Norway
- Coordinates: 68°41′03″N 16°32′08″E
- Country: Norway
- Region: Northern Norway
- County: Troms
- District: Central Hålogaland
- Municipality: Harstad Municipality
- Elevation: 6 m (20 ft)
- Time zone: UTC+01:00 (CET)
  - Summer (DST): UTC+02:00 (CEST)
- Post Code: 9419 Sørvik

Sørvika is a village in Harstad Municipality in Troms county, Norway. It is located along the Vågsfjorden on the island of Hinnøya about 17 kilometres (11 mi) south of the town of Harstad

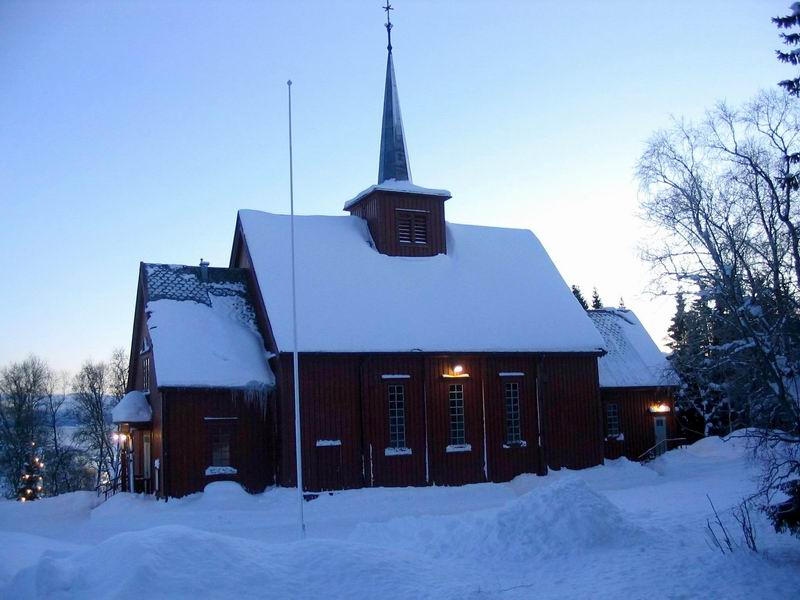
Sandtorg Church

Its population (2001) is about 451. The village includes the Sørvik Barneskole school which houses grades 1 through 7, the Sørvik barnehage kindergarten, and the Sørvik sykehjem nursing home. Sørvik also has its own football team called SMIL (Sørvikmark Idrettslag). There is also the Sandtorg Church, and a gas station. In the churchyard are three British war graves.

== Sørvik Rural Museum ==
There is also a rural/historical museum in boundary with the church and cemetery grounds, which is open every summer for visitors. The museum was founded in June 1953, and consists of several log buildings moved from various locations near Harstad Municipality.

The museum displays early 20th-century and earlier Norwegian domestic life, regional log architecture, agricultural and fishing equipment, and historical tools. Guided tours are available for visiting groups.

== Vikevatnet ==
Vikevatnet is a lake located about 1.5 km (0.93 mi) northwest of Sørvika. Vikevatnet is formed by various small brooks from nearby fens, but mainly from its main water source from Vollstadheia. The outgoing stream/river, known as "Sørvikelva", ends by the coast of Sørvika. This river was earlier populated by salmon and sea trout, but vanished because of the lack of continuous heavy water stream and earlier pollution. Vikevatnet is a popular fishing destination for families or fishing enthusiasts from all around Harstad Municipality and other nearby areas. The main population of fish consists of trout, Arctic char, and some freshwater eel (Anguillidae). The surrounding properties are mainly owned by local farmers or other landed property. The lake is also a very popular bird destination, and you can often see rather rare (for this area) birds in this area including swan, black-throated loon, dipper, snipe, Eurasian curlew, Eurasian whimbrel, northern lapwing, and a variety of freshwater ducks and grebe birds.

Vikevatnet in summer.

The most common guest of the waters is the Vikevatnet trout.

== Metal community ==
Sørvika is locally known as a "metal-community". The heavy metal music movement is connected to the youth of the village. There have been several well-known bands that have their roots in the village. Examples are Cat Eye (who will soon sign their first record with a German company), Flame Thrower (who won Norway's biggest amateur rock-contest Rock Mot Rus in 2005), Eternal Silence, and Monkey Business.
