= HMS Queen (D19) =

American escort carrier transferred to the Royal Navy

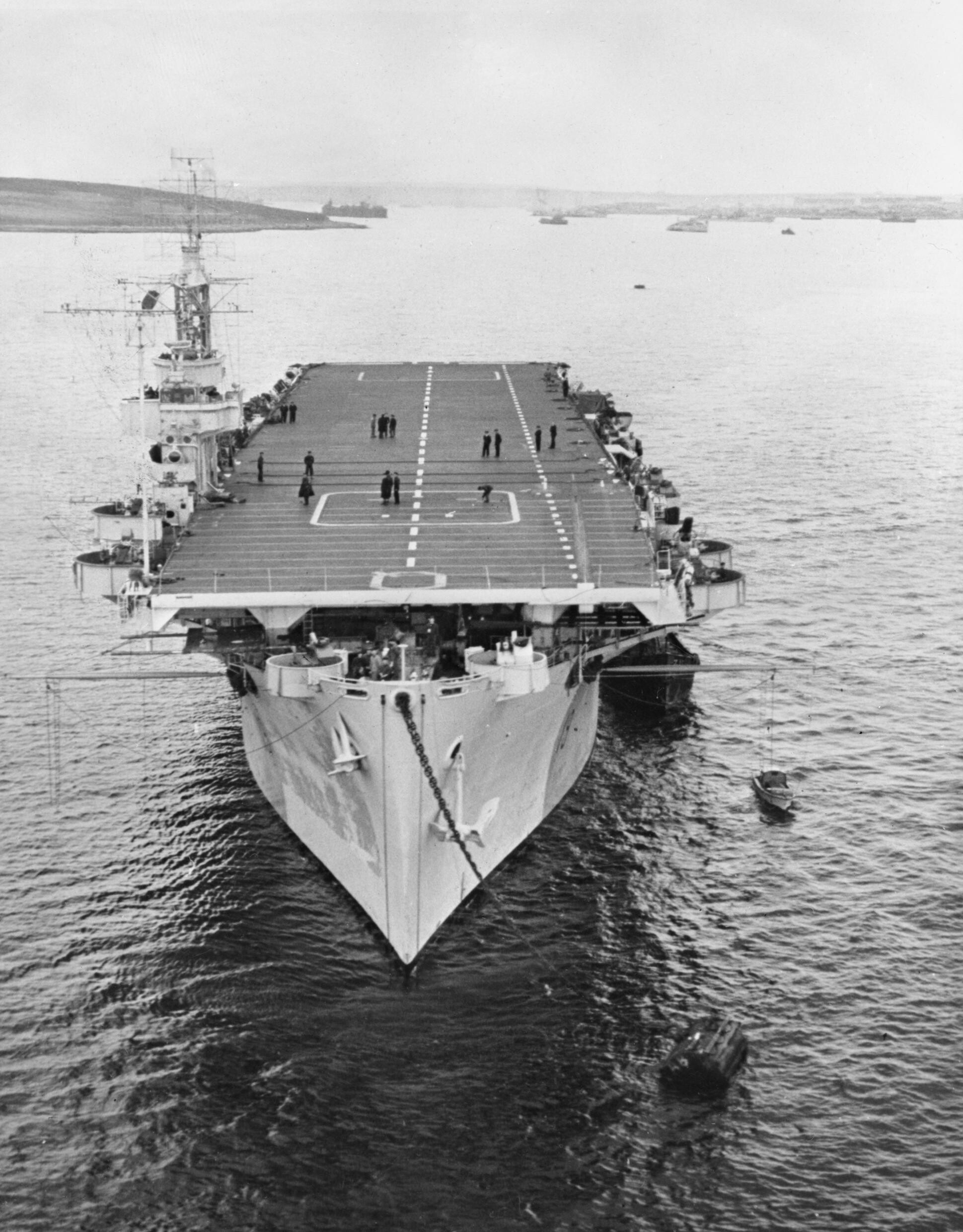
- HMS Queen

History

United States
- Name: USS St. Andrews
- Namesake: St. Andrews Bay in Florida
- Builder: Seattle-Tacoma Shipbuilding Corporation
- Laid down: 12 March 1943
- Launched: 2 August 1943
- Fate: Transferred to Royal Navy

United Kingdom
- Name: HMS Queen
- Commissioned: 7 December 1943
- Decommissioned: July 1947
- Identification: Pennant number:D19
- Fate: Sold as merchant ship; scrapped 1972

General characteristics
- Class & type: Bogue-class escort carrier (USA); Ruler-class escort carrier (UK)
- Displacement: 8,333 tons
- Length: 496 ft (151 m)
- Beam: 69 ft 6 in (21.18 m)
- Draught: 23 ft 3 in (7.09 m)
- Propulsion: Steam turbines, 1 shaft, 8,500 shp (6.3 MW)
- Speed: 17 knots (31 km/h)
- Complement: 646 officers and men
- Armament: 2 × 4"/50, 5"/38 or 5"/51 guns; 8 × twin 40 mm Bofors; 35 × single 20 mm Oerlikon
- Aircraft carried: 18–24

The USS St. Andrews (CVE-49) (originally AVG-49, later ACV-49) was assigned to MC hull 260 on 23 August 1942, a ship to be built to modified C3-S-A1 plans. She was laid down on 12 March 1943 by the Seattle-Tacoma Shipbuilding Corporation of Tacoma, Washington; redesignated CVE-49 on 15 July; and launched on 31 July; sponsored by Mrs. Robert W. Morse; transferred to the United Kingdom under Lend-Lease on 7 December; and commissioned the same day as HMS Queen (D19) in the Royal Navy.

HMS Queen served British and Allied escort forces in protecting the vital convoy supply effort across the North Atlantic in 1944, and in the Pacific campaigns in 1945. On 4 May 1945 aircraft of Queen's 853 Squadron, Fleet Air Arm, took part in Operation Judgement, the last air-raid of the European war, at Kilbotn, Norway. After hostilities ceased, she was converted to a troop carrier and used to bring British forces back from the Far East, before being returned to the United States at Norfolk, Virginia, 31 October 1946.

On arrival, Queen was decommissioned by the Royal Navy and was taken over by the U.S. Navy. In excess of Navy needs, CVE-49 was slated, in December, for disposal; struck from the Navy Register in July 1947, sold to the N.V. Stoomv, Maats, Nederland Co., Amsterdam, Netherlands and pressed into merchant service as Roebiah on 29 July 1947 (renamed President Marcos in 1967 and Lucky One in 1972). She was scrapped in Taiwan in 1972.

== Design and description ==
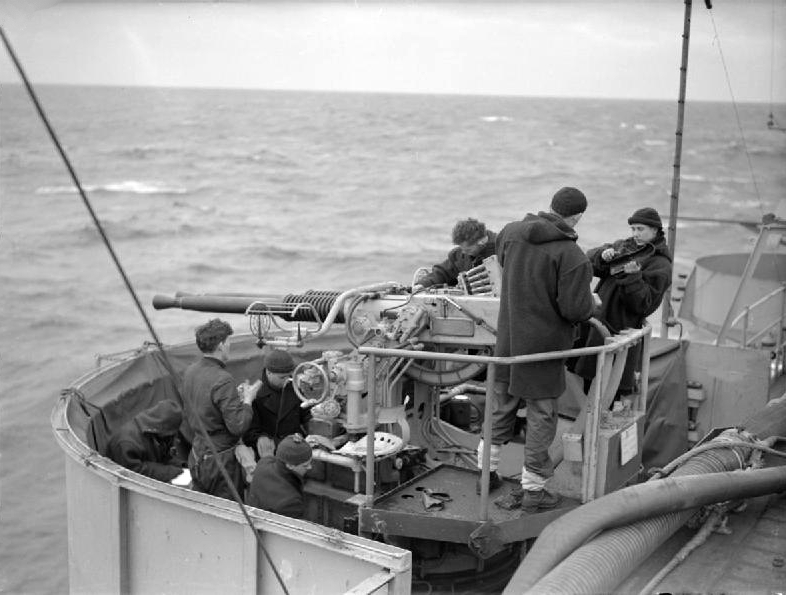
Twin 40 mm Bofors anti-aircraft gun.

These ships were all larger and had a greater aircraft capacity than all the preceding American built escort carriers. They were also all laid down as escort carriers and not converted merchant ships. All the ships had a complement of 646 men and an overall length of 492 feet 3 inches (150.0 m), a beam of 69 feet 6 inches (21.2 m) and a draught of 25 ft 6 in (7.8 m). Propulsion was provided a steam turbine, two boilers connected to one shaft giving 9,350 brake horsepower (SHP), which could propel the ship at 16.5 knots (30.6 km/h; 19.0 mph).

Aircraft facilities were a small combined bridge–flight control on the starboard side, two aircraft lifts 43 feet (13.1 m) by 34 feet (10.4 m), one aircraft catapult and nine arrestor wires. Aircraft could be housed in the 260 feet (79.2 m) by 62 feet (18.9 m) hangar below the flight deck. Armament comprised: two 4"/50, 5"/38 or 5"/51 Dual Purpose guns in single mounts, sixteen 40 mm Bofors anti-aircraft guns in twin mounts and twenty 20 mm Oerlikon anti-aircraft cannons in single mounts. They had a maximum aircraft capacity of twenty-four aircraft which could be a mixture of Grumman Martlet, Vought F4U Corsair or Hawker Sea Hurricane fighter aircraft and Fairey Swordfish or Grumman Avenger anti-submarine aircraft.
