= Kilbotn =

Village in Harstad Municipality, Norway

- Village
- Interactive map of Kilbotn
- Location within Troms Location within Norway
- Coordinates: 68°43′04″N 16°32′07″E
- Country: Norway
- Region: Northern Norway
- County: Troms
- District: Central Hålogaland
- Municipality: Harstad Municipality
- Elevation: 22 m (72 ft)
- Time zone: UTC+01:00 (CET)
  - Summer (DST): UTC+02:00 (CEST)
- Post Code: 9415 Harstad

Kilbotn is a village in Harstad Municipality in Troms county, Norway. The village is located about 12 km (7.5 mi) south of the center of the town of Harstad, along the Vågsfjorden on the east side of Hinnøya island. The villages of Fauskevåg and Sørvika are just a few kilometres to the south of Kilbotn. The population (2001) of the village is 332, but since 2002 it has been considered a part of the Harstad urban area.

== History ==
During World War II, Nazi Germany used Kilbotn as a U-boat base. On 4 May 1945, the last air raid of World War II in Europe took place when the Royal Navy's Fleet Air Arm attacked the Kilbotn anchorage with 44 aircraft from three offshore aircraft carriers in Operation Judgement. The harbour contained the submarine depot ship Black Watch with the German submarine U-711 moored alongside. The wreck of Black Watch lies in Kilbotn harbour close to the wreck of U-711.
