= Bjarkøy (disambiguation) =

Bjarkøy may refer to:

== People ==
- Torfinn Bjarkøy (1952–2022), a Norwegian civil servant

== Places ==
- Bjarkøy Municipality, a former municipality in Troms county, Norway
- Bjarkøya, an island in Harstad Municipality in Troms county, Norway
- Bjarkøy Church, a church in Harstad Municipality in Troms county, Norway

== Other ==
- Bjarkøy Fixed Link, a bridge and tunnel network that connects 3 islands in Harstad Municipality in Troms county, Norway
