= Sandsøya =

Sandsøya or Sandsøy may refer to:

- Sandsøya, Møre og Romsdal, an island in Sande Municipality in Møre og Romsdal county, Norway
- Sandsøya, Nordland, an island in Vågan Municipality in Nordland county, Norway
- Sandsøya, Troms, an island in Harstad Municipality in Troms county, Norway
- Sandsøya, Vestland, an island in Tysnes Municipality in Vestland county, Norway
- Sandsøy Church, a church in Harstad Municipality in Troms county, Norway
