= Christian B. Apenes =

Norwegian judge and politician

Christian Bernt Apenes (19 February 1902 – 20 October 1976) was a Norwegian judge and politician.

== Personal life ==
He was born in Fredriksstad. He was the son of a ship-broker, Georg Apenes (1869–1902), and his wife Kitty, née Mørch (1872–1958). His brother Ola was an engineer, archaeologist and volunteer soldier during the Second World War.

In 1939, he married an engineer's daughter, Inger-Johanne Framholdt Johansen (born 1917). Their son Georg Apenes (1940–2016) became an MP and director of the Norwegian Data Inspectorate. Inger-Johanne Apenes was murdered in 1978, after Christian's death. The case was unsolved until 2007, when someone confessed to the murder. By that time, however, the case was juridically obsolete.

== Career ==
He finished his secondary education in 1921 and graduated from the Royal Frederick University with the cand.jur. degree in 1925. After studying at Lund University in 1926 he worked three years as a deputy judge in Nordre Sunnmøre District Court. He was a deputy for the stipendiary magistrate in his hometown Fredrikstad from 1929 to 1934, then acting stipendiary magistrate in 1934 before being appointed as town secretary. He also served as an elected member of Fredrikstad city council from 1935 to 1937 and 1952 to 1955.

In 1946, he was promoted again, to acting Chief Administrative Officer of Fredrikstad municipality. In 1947 he became acting stipendiary magistrate in Sarpsborg, rounding off his career as district stipendiary magistrate, the chief judge of Sarpsborg District Court from 1952 to 1972.

He was a board member of the Larvik–Frederikshavn Ferry, Fredriksstad Blad, Fredrikstad Bryggeri and from 1958 the trade union Embetsmennenes Landsforbund (a forerunner of Akademikernes Fellesorganisasjon). He chaired the council of Borgarsyssel Museum and was the deputy chairman of the Norwegian Association of Judges from 1957.

He was also known as a writer, among others of the humorous books Det Grønne Guld (1960), Bak rettens skranke (1963), Mennesker og jurister (1967) and Mellom to skjeggaldre (1970). He also wrote local history books about Fredrikstad og Omegns Bank and Fredrikstad Bryggeri.

He received the King's Medal of Merit in gold and was decorated as a Knight, First Class of the Order of St. Olav in 1972. He died in 1976.
