= Lars Oftedal Broch =

Norwegian judge (1939–2017)

Lars Oftedal Broch (1 January 1939 – 11 November 2017) was a Norwegian judge.

He graduated as cand.jur. from the University of Oslo in 1965, and worked as consultant in the Ministry of Justice and the Police from 1965, worked under the Norwegian Consumer Ombudsman from 1971, as deputy under-secretary of State in the Ministry of Justice from 1972, as president of the International Organisation of Consumers Unions from 1983 to 1987. From 1989 to 1996 he was the director of the Norwegian National Authority for the Investigation and Prosecution of Economic and Environmental Crime, and from 1996 to 2008 he was a Supreme Court Justice.

He was a member of the Labour Party, but as a member of Sosialistisk Studentlag in 1958 took part in the so-called "Easter Uprising". He left the Labour Party after this, but contrary to some he did not join the new Socialist Left Party.

His maternal grandfather is Lars Oftedal, and he was married to Kjersti Graver. They resided at Jar.

Police appointments
Preceded by position created	Director of the Norwegian National Authority for the Investigation and Prosecution of Economic and Environmental Crime; 1989–1996	Succeeded by Anstein Gjengedal
