= Ola Apenes =

Norwegian engineer, archaeologist and soldier

Ola Rasmus Apenes (23 August 1898 – 6 April 1943) was a Norwegian-born engineer, archaeologist and soldier.

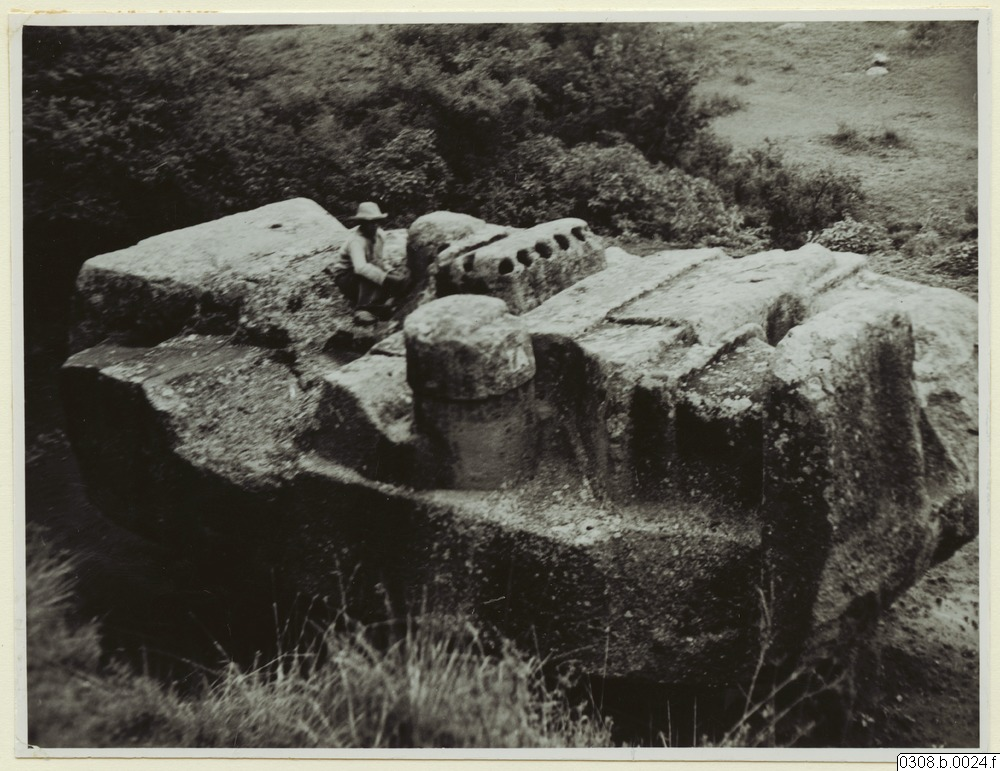
Tlaloc monolith (San Miguel Coatlinchán), Photograph taken by the engineer Ola Just in 1934. The identity of the person on the monolith is unknown.

He was born in Fredriksstad as a son of shipbroker Georg Apenes (1869–1902) and his wife Kitty, née Mørch (1872–1958). His brother Christian was a judge and politician. Through him, Ola was an uncle of politician Georg Apenes.

He finished his secondary education in 1916 and took an engineering education in the Swedish company ASEA as well as at ETH Zurich in 1923. In 1927 he travelled to the United States to work with railroad electrification, going on to Mexico in 1929 to work as a telephone engineer for Ericsson there. Once there, he became immensely interested in the ancient culture and archaeological artefacts to be found there. He took a university degree in Mesoamerican archaeology in 1933. Among others, he studied the field Chimalhuacán, and found it to have been a dwelling site in conjunction with the Lake Texcoco. He also studied cultural practices such as the Danza de los Voladores, and became known for photography and filming. He was published in several periodicals and in 1937 he was a co-founder of the Anthropological Society of Mexico (Sociedad Mexicana de Antropología). He was also a newspaper correspondent.

While in Mexico he started a relationship with anthropologist Frances Gillmor (1903–1993). She accepted a short tenure at the University of New Mexico in 1939; the same year the Second World War broke out. Together with another Norwegian expatriate, Gustav Strømsvik, Apenes endeavored to volunteer for the Norwegian Armed Forces in exile in Little Norway, Canada. Accepted in 1942, he started military training but died from appendicitis in April 1943.

His posthumous work Mapas Antiguos del Valle de México (Ancient Maps of the Valley of Mexico) was published by Universidad Nacional de México in 1947. This work contributed significantly to the knowledge of the historical geography of the region and became an important reference for scholars and lovers of history.
