= Kjersti Graver =

Norwegian jurist (1945–2009)

Kjersti Graver (8 October 1945 – 14 February 2009) was a Norwegian jurist and consumer ombudsman.

== Personal life ==
She was born in Oslo as the oldest child of Gerd and Odd Graver. She was a granddaughter of Torjus Graver and niece of Petter Graver.

She was married to Supreme Court Justice Lars Oftedal Broch, grandson of Lars Oftedal. They resided at Jar.

== Career ==
She took her law degree in 1970. After serving as a deputy judge and working in the Ministry of Consumer Affairs and Administration, she was hired as a head of department in the Norwegian Consumer Council in 1979. From 1984 to 1987 she worked for the Dutch Consumer Research Institute.

She served as the Norwegian Consumer Ombudsman from 1987 to 1995. During this period she was behind a prohibition of the skateboard in Norway, before the restriction was lifted in 1989. In 1995 she was appointed as a presiding judge in the Borgarting Court of Appeal.

She was also a board member of the National Institute for Consumer Research, Amnesty International Norway and a member of the Norwegian Parliamentary Intelligence Oversight Committee. She died in February 2009.

Civic offices
Preceded by Hans Petter Lundgaard	Norwegian Consumer Ombudsman; 1987–1995	Succeeded by Torfinn Bjarkøy
