= Ove Skåra =

Norwegian civil servant (born 1961)

Ove Skåra (born 9 March 1961) is a Norwegian civil servant.

Skåra is the current director of information in the Norwegian Data Inspectorate. When long-time director Georg Apenes stepped down in April 2010, Skåra was acting director. He made his mark while in office; among others the Data Inspectorate, together with other organizations, boycotted a sitdown arranged by the Norwegian Ministry of Justice and the Police where the Data Retention Directive was to be debated. Skåra reverted to being information director when Bjørn Erik Thon was named as permanent director in late May 2010. Skåra was not among those who applied for the position.

Skåra resides in Bærum.

Government offices
Preceded by Georg Apenes	Director of the Norwegian Data Inspectorate; April 2010–May 2010 (acting)	Succeeded by Bjørn Erik Thon
