= Bjørn Erik Thon =

Norwegian jurist and ombudsman (born 1964)

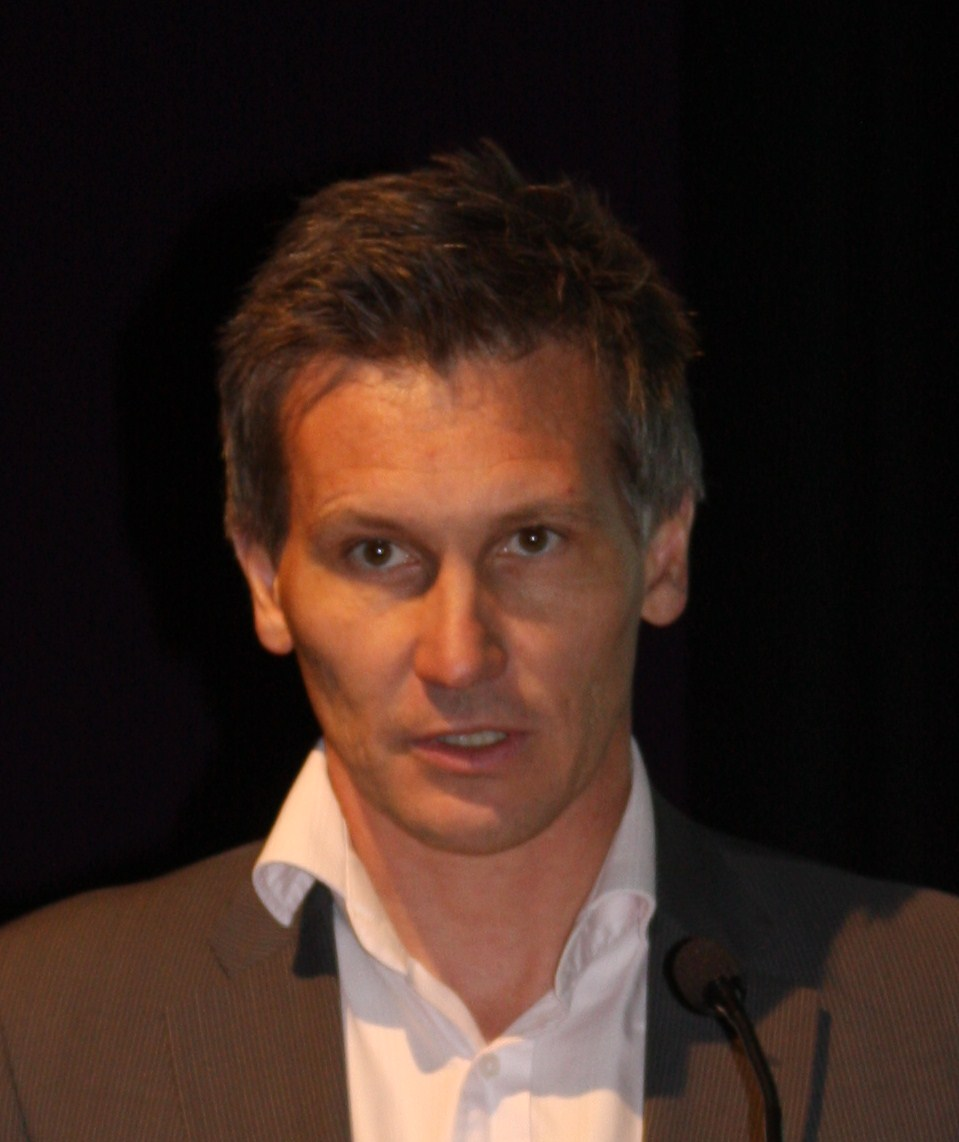

Ombudsman of the Gender Equality and Anti-Discrimination Ombud
- Incumbent
- Assumed office 28 February 2022
- Preceded by: Hanne Bjurstrøm

Director of the Norwegian Data Protection Authority
- In office 2 August 2010 – 28 February 2022
- Preceded by: Georg Apenes
- Succeeded by: Line Coll

Director of the Norwegian Consumer Ombud
- In office 2000–2010
- Preceded by: Torfinn Bjarkøy
- Succeeded by: Gry Nergård

Personal details
- Born: 6 February 1964 (age 61)
- Occupation: Jurist

Bjørn Erik Thon (born 6 February 1964) is a Norwegian jurist and ombudsman.

== Career ==
He graduated as cand.jur. in 1989. From 1999 to 2000, during the first cabinet Bondevik Thon worked as a political advisor in the Ministry of Justice and the Police. He has been a member of Grefsen-Kjelsås borough council for the Liberal Party. From 2000 to 2010, he headed the office of the Norwegian Consumer Ombudsman. His period was renewed in 2007. He succeeded Georg Apenes as director of the Norwegian Data Inspectorate in late May 2010, though his immediate predecessor was acting director Ove Skåra.

=== Ombudsman of Gender Equality and Anti-Discrimination ===
On 19 November 2021, he was nominated to succeed Hanne Bjurstrøm as ombudsman of the Gender Equality and Anti-Discrimination Ombud. He became the first man to hold the position. He assumes office on 28 February 2022.

In July 2022, Thon argued that the incident of a Russian woman not being granted a job interview due to her nationality, was a clear example of discrimination. He also emphasised that it was important to differentiate between the Russian state and individual Russian citizens. He was supported by lawyer Henriette Willix from Advokatfirmaet Sulland.

== Writing ==
In 2000, he started his career as a writer with his crime novel Svart kappe. He followed with the crime novels Den tause klienten in 2002 and Den enes død in 2004. In 2005 he wrote the consumer issues book Forbrukerjungelboka with Ola Fæhn.

Preceded by Torfinn Bjarkøy	Norwegian Consumer Ombudsman; 2000–2010	Succeeded by Gry Nergård
Preceded by Ove Skåra (acting)	Director of the Norwegian Data Inspectorate; 2010–2022	Succeeded by Line Coll
Preceded by Hanne Bjurstrøm	Ombudsman of the Gender Equality and Anti-Discrimination Ombud; 2022–present	Incumbent
