= Elisabeth Lier Haugseth =

Norwegian lawyer and civil servant

- Born: 1961 (age 64–65)
- Education: University of Oslo
- Occupations: Lawyer and government official

Elisabeth Lier Haugseth (born 1961) is a Norwegian lawyer and civil servant.

She served as the deputy Gender Equality and Anti-Discrimination Ombud until 2016, the Consumer Ombud of Norway from 2016 to 2018 and then (following the reorganization of the Ombud's office) as the director-general of the Norwegian Consumer Council from 2018 to 2020. From 2020 she is a director-general in the Ministry of Culture and Equality, where she heads the Department for Equality, Non-Discrimination and International Affairs.

Haugseth graduated with the cand.jur. degree at the University of Oslo in 2000, and was a deputy judge and an associate in the law firm of Wiersholm before her career in the civil service.

Civic offices
Preceded by Gry Nergård	Norwegian Consumer Ombudsman/Director of the Norwegian Consumer Council; 2016–2020	Succeeded by Trond Rønningen
