= Bjarkøy Municipality =

Former municipality in Troms, Norway

Bjarkøy Municipality Bjarkøy kommune Bjarkedjo suohkan (Northern Sami)
- Former municipality
- Bjarkø herred (historic name); Sand herred (historic name)
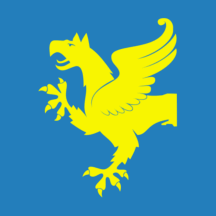
- Flag Coat of arms

- Troms within Norway

- Bjarkøy within Troms
- Coordinates: 68°59′55″N 16°29′53″E
- Country: Norway
- County: Troms
- District: Central Hålogaland
- Established: 1 Jan 1838
  - Created as: Formannskapsdistrikt
- Disestablished: 1 Jan 2013
  - Succeeded by: Harstad Municipality
- Administrative centre: Nergården

Government
  - Mayor (2011-2012): Jorunn Berg (LL)

Area (upon dissolution)
  - Total: 73.61 km^{2} (28.42 sq mi)
  - Land: 73.44 km^{2} (28.36 sq mi)
  - Water: 0.17 km^{2} (0.066 sq mi) 0.2%
  - Rank: #399 in Norway
- Highest elevation: 987 m (3,238 ft)

Population (2012)
  - Total: 455
  - Rank: #427 in Norway
  - Density: 6.2/km^{2} (16/sq mi)
  - Change (10 years): ▼ −17.9%
- Demonym: Bjarkøyværing

Official language
  - Norwegian form: Neutral
- Time zone: UTC+01:00 (CET)
  - Summer (DST): UTC+02:00 (CEST)
- ISO 3166 code: NO-1915

Bjarkøy is a former municipality in Troms county, Norway. The 73.6-square-kilometre (28.4 sq mi) municipality existed from 1838 until it was merged with Harstad Municipality on 1 January 2013. The administrative centre of the municipality was the village of Nergården on the island of Bjarkøya. The island municipality was spread across several islands: Bjarkøya, Sandsøya, Grytøya (northern half), Krøttøya, and many smaller ones. Originally, the municipality also included the southwestern tip of the large island of Senja.

Prior to its dissolution in 2013, the 73.6-square-kilometre (28.4 sq mi) municipality was the 399th largest by area out of the 429 municipalities in Norway. Bjarkøy Municipality was the 427th most populous municipality in Norway with a population of about 455, making it the 3rd smallest in the country. The municipality's population density was 6.2 inhabitants per square kilometre (16/sq mi) and its population had decreased by 17.9% over the previous 10-year period.

One of the reasons why Bjarkøy merged with Harstad Municipality in 2013 was due to the promised funding of the Bjarkøy Fixed Link project. It would link the main islands of Bjarkøy together with a bridge and undersea road tunnel enabling residents to drive further which would drastically shorten the ferry ride to the mainland in Harstad.

== General information ==
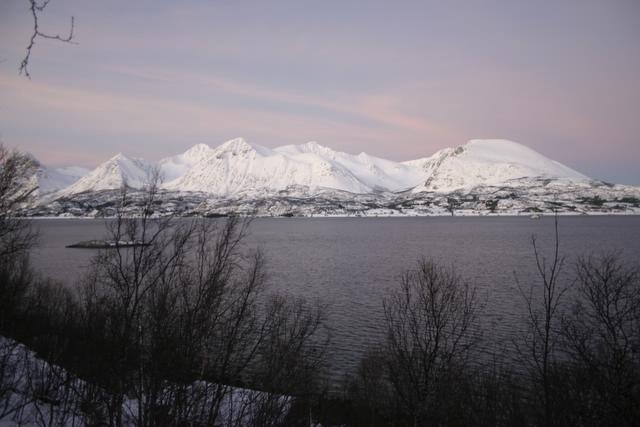
View of Grytøya island

The prestegjeld (church parish) of Sand was established as a municipality on 1 January 1838 (see formannskapsdistrikt law). The name was later changed to "Bjarkøy". During the 1960s, there were many municipal mergers across Norway due to the work of the Schei Committee. On 1 January 1964, the southernmost part of the island of Senja (the Senjehesten peninsula) and the Lemmingsvær island (total population of the two locations: 480) was transferred from Bjarkøy to Tranøy Municipality. On 1 January 2013, Bjarkøy Municipality was merged with Harstad Municipality to the south, forming a new, larger Harstad Municipality.

=== Name ===
The municipality (originally the parish) was originally named "Sand" after the old Sand farm (Old Norse: Sand) on the island of Sandsøya, since the first Bjarkøy Church was built there. The name comes from the word is sandr which means "sand" or "sandbank". In 1887, the church was moved to the island of Bjarkøya, so the municipal name was changed to Bjarkø. This new name comes from the island of Bjarkøya (Old Norse: Bjarkarey). The first element is the genitive case of bjǫrk which means "birch". The last element is ey which means "island". (The name of the island, since it is an old trading place, is perhaps inspired by the name of the old and well-known town of Birka in Sweden, which has the same meaning). Historically, the name of the municipality was spelled Bjarkø. On 6 January 1908, a royal resolution changed the spelling of the name of the municipality to Bjarkøy, to give the name a more Norwegian and less Danish spelling due to Norwegian language reforms.

=== Coat of arms ===
The coat of arms was granted on 11 April 1986. The official blazon is "Azure, a demi-griffin passant Or" (Norwegian: I blått en halv gull griff). This means the arms have a blue field (background) and the charge is a demi-griffin (upper half showing, no legs). The griffin has a tincture of Or which means it is commonly colored yellow, but if it is made out of metal, then gold is used. Bjarkøy wanted to have its coat of arms to be the same as those used by the medieval Bjarkøy noble family, however, the old 13th century family arms were already in use by Troms county. So a variation was adopted - a demi-griffin was used instead. This family was one of the most influential families in the northern part of Norway during medieval times. They used a griffin for the arms of the family starting in the late 13th century. The arms were designed by Øystein H. Skaugvolldal. The arms of Bjarkøy were retired after the merger in 2013 since Harstad retained its old coat of arms after the merger.

=== Churches ===
The Church of Norway had one parish (sokn) within Bjarkøy Municipality. At the time of the municipal dissolution, it was part of the Trondenes prosti (deanery) in the Diocese of Nord-Hålogaland.

Churches in Bjarkøy Municipality
Parish (sokn)	Church name	Location of the church	Year built
Bjarkøy og Sandsøy	Bjarkøy Church	Nergården	1766
Bjarkøy og Sandsøy	Sandsøy Church	Sandsøya	1888

== History ==
This is old Viking territory, and it was a chieftain seat during the Viking Age and the Middle Ages. Among the more famous chieftains you find Thorir Hund, who killed Norway's Patron Saint, Saint Olav in the Battle of Stiklestad in 1030. In 1323, the chieftain seat was raided and burned by Karelian and Novgorod warriors.

== Geography ==
The municipality of Bjarkøy was located entirely on islands. The largest island, Grytøya, was shared with the municipality of Harstad. Other islands included Bjarkøya, Sandsøya, Helløya, Flatøya, and Meløyvær. The Andfjorden flowed along the northern and western side of the municipality and the Vågsfjorden flowed on the eastern and southern sides of the municipality. The highest point in the municipality is the 987-metre (3,238 ft) tall mountain Skjellesvikgalten on the island of Grytøya.

=== Climate ===
Climate data for Bjarkøya
Month	Jan	Feb	Mar	Apr	May	Jun	Jul	Aug	Sep	Oct	Nov	Dec	Year
Daily mean °C (°F)	−2.4 (27.7)	−2.4 (27.7)	−1.3 (29.7)	1.4 (34.5)	5.7 (42.3)	9.3 (48.7)	11.8 (53.2)	11.5 (52.7)	7.9 (46.2)	4.2 (39.6)	0.7 (33.3)	−1.5 (29.3)	3.7 (38.7)
Average precipitation mm (inches)	93 (3.7)	79 (3.1)	68 (2.7)	54 (2.1)	41 (1.6)	45 (1.8)	73 (2.9)	69 (2.7)	88 (3.5)	118 (4.6)	90 (3.5)	107 (4.2)	925 (36.4)
Source: Norwegian Meteorological Institute

== Government ==
While it existed, Bjarkøy Municipality was responsible for primary education (through 10th grade), outpatient health services, senior citizen services, welfare and other social services, zoning, economic development, and municipal roads and utilities. The municipality was governed by a municipal council of directly elected representatives. The mayor was indirectly elected by a vote of the municipal council. The municipality was under the jurisdiction of the Hålogaland Court of Appeal.

=== Municipal council ===
The municipal council (Kommunestyre) of Bjarkøy Municipality was made up of 13 representatives that were elected to four year terms. The tables below show the historical composition of the council by political party.

Bjarkøy kommunestyre 2011–2012
Party name (in Norwegian)	Number of representatives
Centre Party (Senterpartiet)	6
Sandsøy/Fenes/Skjellesvik common list (Sandsøy/Fenes/Skjellesvik fellesliste)	4
Bjarkøy List (Bjarkøylista)	3
Total number of members:	13
Note: On 1 January 2013, Bjarkøy Municipality became part of Harstad Municipality.

Bjarkøy kommunestyre 2007–2011
Party name (in Norwegian)	Number of representatives
Sandsøy/Fenes/Skjellesvik common list (Sandsøy/Fenes/Skjellesvik fellesliste)	6
Bjarkøy List (Bjarkøylista)	7
Total number of members:	13

Bjarkøy kommunestyre 2003–2007
Party name (in Norwegian)	Number of representatives
Sandsøy/Fenes/Skjellesvik common list (Sandsøy/Fenes/Skjellesvik fellesliste)	7
Bjarkøy List (Bjarkøylista)	6
Total number of members:	13

Bjarkøy kommunestyre 1999–2003
Party name (in Norwegian)	Number of representatives
Labour Party (Arbeiderpartiet)	4
Sandsøy/Fenes/Skjellesvik common list (Sandsøy/Fenes/Skjellesvik fellesliste)	4
Bjarkøy List (Bjarkøylista)	9
Total number of members:	17

Bjarkøy kommunestyre 1995–1999
Party name (in Norwegian)	Number of representatives
Labour Party (Arbeiderpartiet)	3
Sandsøy/Fenes/Skjellesvik common list (Sandsøy/Fenes/Skjellesvik fellesliste)	6
Bjarkøy List (Bjarkøylista)	8
Total number of members:	17

Bjarkøy kommunestyre 1991–1995
Party name (in Norwegian)	Number of representatives
Labour Party (Arbeiderpartiet)	8
Joint List(s) of Non-Socialist Parties (Borgerlige Felleslister)	5
Fenes/Skjellesvik common list (Fenes/Skjellesvik fellesliste)	1
Sandsøy local list (Sandsøy bygdeliste)	3
Total number of members:	17

Bjarkøy kommunestyre 1987–1991
Party name (in Norwegian)	Number of representatives
Labour Party (Arbeiderpartiet)	5
Joint list of the Conservative Party (Høyre) and the Centre Party (Senterpartiet)	3
Fenes and Skjellesvik Common List (Fenes og Skjellesvik fellesliste)	1
Bjarkøy and Øyenes List (Bjarkøy og Øyenes liste)	5
Sandsøy local list (Sandsøy bygdeliste)	3
Total number of members:	17

Bjarkøy kommunestyre 1983–1987
Party name (in Norwegian)	Number of representatives
Labour Party (Arbeiderpartiet)	5
Conservative Party (Høyre)	3
Joint list of the Centre Party (Senterpartiet), Christian Democratic Party (Kristelig Folkeparti), and Liberal Party (Venstre)	5
Fenes and Skjellesvik Local List (Fenes og Skjellesvik Bygdeliste)	1
Bjarkøy/Sandsøy and Øyenes List (Bjarkøy/Sandsøy og Øyenes liste)	3
Total number of members:	17

Bjarkøy kommunestyre 1979–1983
Party name (in Norwegian)	Number of representatives
Labour Party (Arbeiderpartiet)	6
Conservative Party (Høyre)	4
Joint list of the Centre Party (Senterpartiet), Christian Democratic Party (Kristelig Folkeparti), and Liberal Party (Venstre)	6
Fenes and Skjellesvik Common List (Fenes og Skjellesvik Fellesliste)	1
Total number of members:	17

Bjarkøy kommunestyre 1975–1979
Party name (in Norwegian)	Number of representatives
Labour Party (Arbeiderpartiet)	8
Øyenes Common List (Øyenes Fellesliste)	1
Bjarkøy List (Bjarkøy Liste)	6
Fenes and Skjellesvik Common List (Fenes og Skjellesvik Fellesliste)	1
Sandsøy and Fenes Common List (Sandsøy og Fenes Fellesliste)	1
Total number of members:	17

Bjarkøy kommunestyre 1971–1975
Party name (in Norwegian)	Number of representatives
Local List(s) (Lokale lister)	17
Total number of members:	17

Bjarkøy kommunestyre 1967–1971
Party name (in Norwegian)	Number of representatives
Local List(s) (Lokale lister)	17
Total number of members:	17

Bjarkøy kommunestyre 1963–1967
Party name (in Norwegian)	Number of representatives
Local List(s) (Lokale lister)	17
Total number of members:	17

Bjarkøy herredsstyre 1959–1963
Party name (in Norwegian)	Number of representatives
Local List(s) (Lokale lister)	17
Total number of members:	17

Bjarkøy herredsstyre 1955–1959
Party name (in Norwegian)	Number of representatives
Local List(s) (Lokale lister)	17
Total number of members:	17

Bjarkøy herredsstyre 1951–1955
Party name (in Norwegian)	Number of representatives
Local List(s) (Lokale lister)	16
Total number of members:	16

Bjarkøy herredsstyre 1947–1951
Party name (in Norwegian)	Number of representatives
List of workers, fishermen, and small farmholders (Arbeidere, fiskere, småbrukere liste)	2
Local List(s) (Lokale lister)	10
Total number of members:	12

Bjarkøy herredsstyre 1945–1947
Party name (in Norwegian)	Number of representatives
Labour Party (Arbeiderpartiet)	1
Local List(s) (Lokale lister)	15
Total number of members:	16

Bjarkøy herredsstyre 1937–1941*
Party name (in Norwegian)	Number of representatives
Labour Party (Arbeiderpartiet)	4
Joint List(s) of Non-Socialist Parties (Borgerlige Felleslister)	4
Local List(s) (Lokale lister)	8
Total number of members:	16
Note: Due to the German occupation of Norway during World War II, no elections were held for new municipal councils until after the war ended in 1945.

=== Mayors ===
The mayor (Norwegian: ordfører) of Bjarkøy Municipality was the political leader of the municipality and the chairperson of the municipal council. Here is a list of people who have held this position:

- 1838–1843: Christian Kildal
- 1844–1852: Eilert H. Kildal
- 1853–1854: Marthinus Kildal Sand
- 1855–1858: Ditlef Wibe Lund
- 1859–1862: Marthinus Knutsen Slagstad
- 1865–1866: Marthinus Kildal Sand
- 1867–1872: Ditlef Wibe Lund
- 1873–1874: Martinus Knutsen Slagstad
- 1875–1894: Ditlef Wibe Lund
- 1895–1907: Gunnerius Lund
- 1908–1917: P. Rørvik
- 1917–1918: Jens L. Jenssen
- 1918–1919: D.B. Tollefsen
- 1919–1925: T.O. Nordvik
- 1926–1931: S. Kildal
- 1932–1941: Ole Slagstad
- 1941–1945: Ingvald Høve (NS)
- 1945–1945: Ole Slagstad
- 1945–1947: Peder J. Bjarke
- 1948–1951: Ditlef Eriksen (Ap)
- 1952–1955: Peder J. Bjarke
- 1955–1959: Ditlef Eriksen (Ap)
- 1960–1967: Arnljot Eidnes (LL)
- 1967–1979: Martin Gideonsen (Ap)
- 1979–1983: Kåre Edg Pettersen (LL)
- 1983–1991: Brynjulf Lauritzen (Ap)
- 1991–1995: Arne Ludolf Petter Kaspersen (Ap)
- 1995–1999: Markus Johan Sakariassen (LL)
- 1999–1999: Harald-Arne Bjarke (LL)
- 1999–2001: Geir Ove Ystmark (V)
- 2001–2003: Trond Markussen (LL)
- 2003–2007: Jorunn Berg (LL)
- 2007–2011: Eddmar Osvoll (LL)
- 2011–2012: Jorunn Berg (LL)

== Media gallery ==
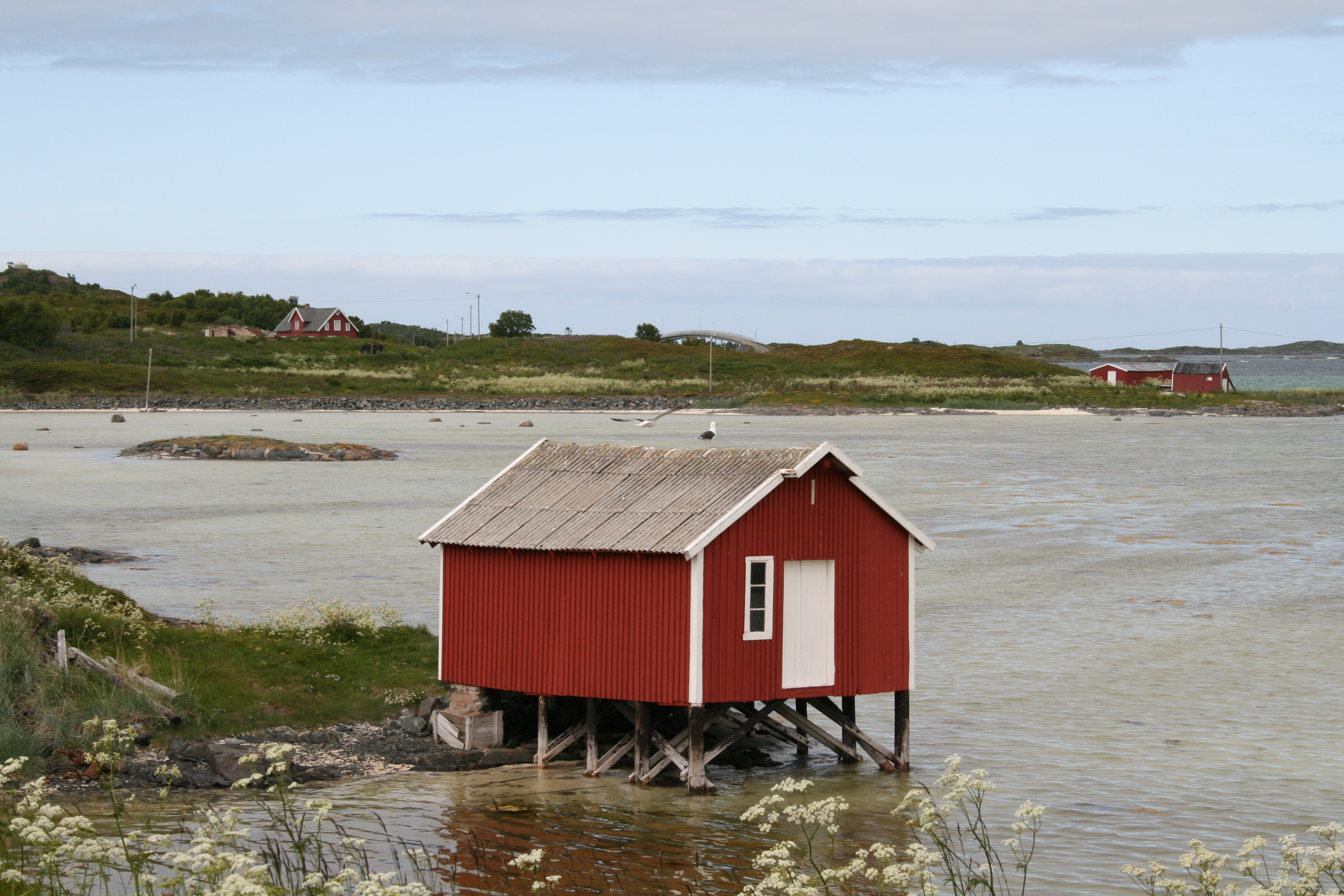
Boathouse located on Krøttøy

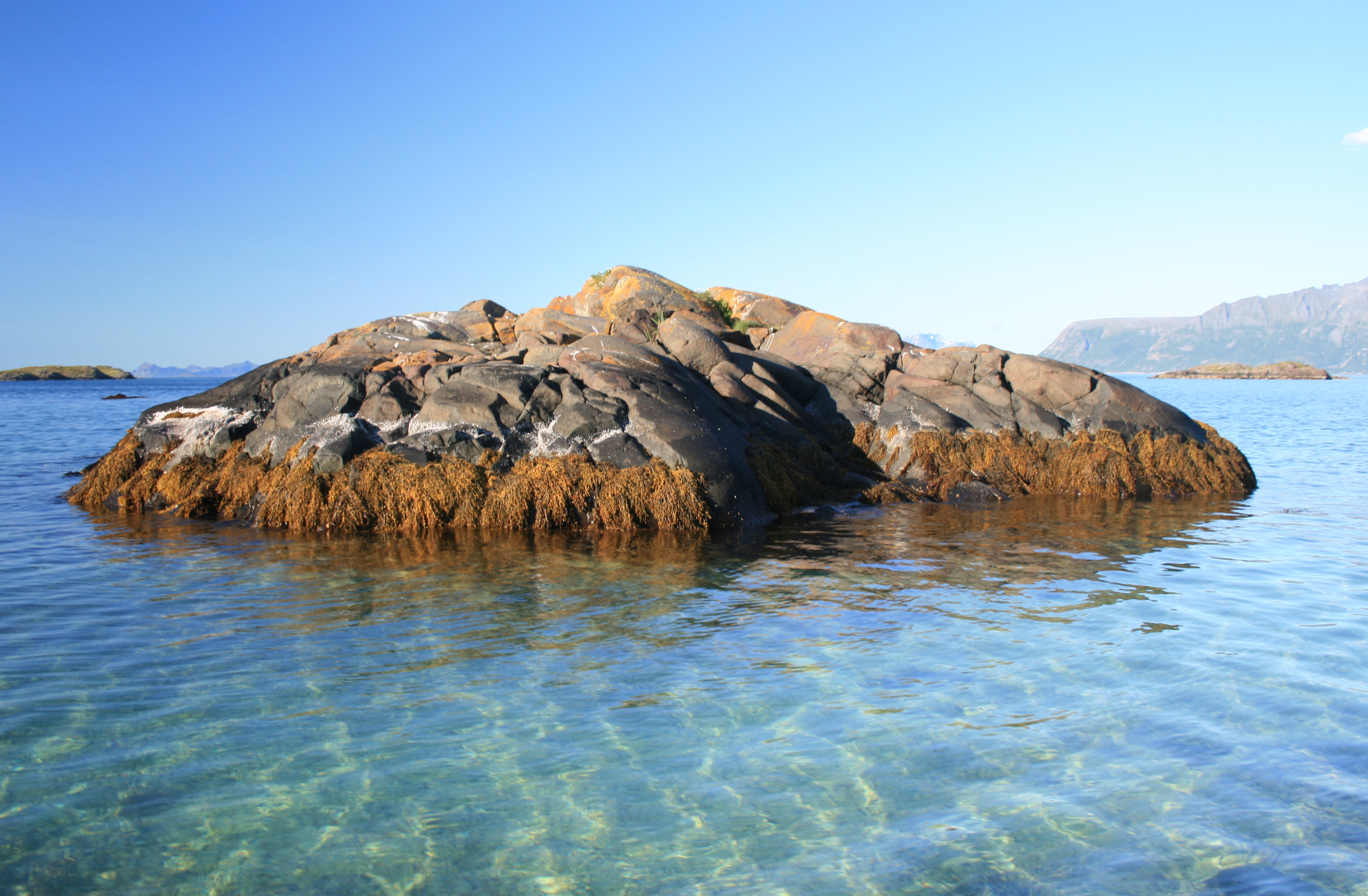
Skerry in shallow water, located just outside Krøttøy

== See also ==
- List of former municipalities of Norway
