= Hans Petter Lundgaard =

Norwegian jurist (1935–2026)

Hans Petter Lundgaard (15 May 1935 – 31 January 2026) was a Norwegian jurist born in Oslo.

== Life and career ==
Lundgaard was employed as a university lector at the University of Oslo from 1963, and took over as leader of the Norwegian Bureau for Insurance Disputes in 1971. In 1973 the position of Norwegian Consumer Ombudsman was created. Inger Louise Valle held the position for many years, but while she was a member of the cabinet Nordli from 1976 to 1981 Lundgaard was acting Norwegian Consumer Ombudsman. Valle left in 1981, and Lundgaard got the job on a permanent basis. In 1986 he was appointed as a presiding judge (lagdommer) in the Eidsivating Court of Appeal, later moving to Borgarting. He retired in 2005.

Lundgaard died on 31 January 2026, at the age of 90.

Political offices
Preceded by Inger Louise Valle	Norwegian Consumer Ombudsman; 1981–1986 (acting since 1976)	Succeeded by Kjersti Graver
