= Gry Nergård =

Norwegian civil servant (born 1966)

Gry Nergård (born 1 April 1966) is a Norwegian civil servant.

She hails from Levanger Municipality and took the cand.jur. degree at the University of Oslo. After a stint as a clerk in the Ministry of the Environment she was hired in the Office of the Consumer Ombudsman in 1992. In 2010 she was appointed as the Norwegian Consumer Ombudsman. Leaving in 2016, she was hired in Finance Norway.

She resides at Slependen, and has been active in the local sports club IL Jardar.

Civic offices
Preceded by Bjørn Erik Thon	Norwegian Consumer Ombudsman; 2010–2016	Succeeded by Elisabeth Lier Haugseth
