= Sandsøy Church =

- Sandsøy kirke
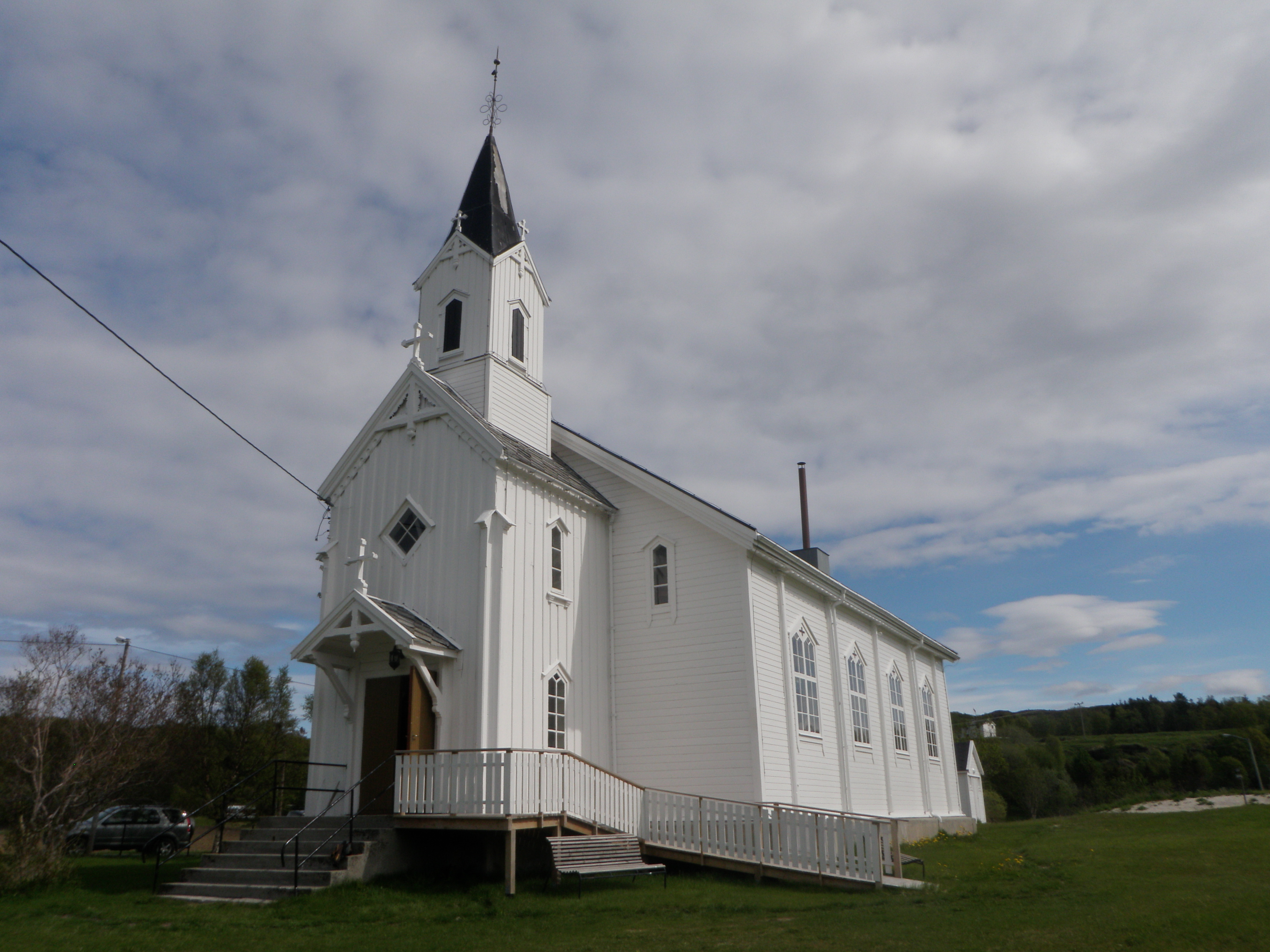
- View of the church
- Sandsøy Church
- 68.9521595°N 16.65900278°E
- Location: Harstad Municipality, Troms
- Country: Norway
- Denomination: Church of Norway
- Churchmanship: Evangelical Lutheran

History
- Status: Parish church
- Founded: 13th century
- Consecrated: 1888

Architecture
- Functional status: Active
- Architect: Ole Scheistrøen
- Architectural type: Long church
- Completed: 1888 (138 years ago)

Specifications
- Capacity: 200
- Materials: Wood

Administration
- Diocese: Nord-Hålogaland
- Deanery: Trondenes prosti
- Parish: Vågsfjord
- Norwegian Cultural Heritage Site
- Type: Church
- Status: Not protected
- ID: 85392

Sandsøy Church (Norwegian: Sandsøy kirke) is a parish church of the Church of Norway in Harstad Municipality in Troms county, Norway. It is located in the village of Sandsøy on the island of Sandsøya. It is one of the churches for the Vågsfjord parish which is part of the Trondenes prosti (deanery) in the Diocese of Nord-Hålogaland. The white, wooden church was built in a long church style in 1888 using plans drawn up by the architect Ole Scheistrøen. The church seats about 200 people.

== History ==
The earliest existing historical records of the church date back to the year 1350, but the church was likely built during the 1200s. The church was subordinate to the Trondenes Church parish for several centuries. Around the year 1640, a new church was built on the site. Historical records do not agree as to the reasons for the new church. Historians have two theories that are partially supported with evidence. One theory is that the old church was torn down around the year 1600 and a new church was built, but around the year 1633, the new church burned down and had to be replaced with a new building on the same site (around 1640). The other theory is that the old church was in poor condition, so around 1640, the church was torn down and replaced with a new building. Regardless which theory is accurate, a new church was built on the island around the year 1640.

In 1731, the church was separated from Trondenes to become a parish of its own. In 1750, the church was described as a log building with a cruciform design. That church was torn down in 1765 and its materials were sold in an auction. A new cruciform church was built on the site in 1766 to serve the parish. During the 1800s, the nearby Bjarkøy Church on the neighboring island of Bjarkøya was torn down and without a church. In the 1880s, it was decided to close Sandsøy Church and move the building to Bjarkøya. So in 1885–1886, the building was disassembled and moved to the neighboring island of Bjarkøya, where it is located in the village of Nergården and it is now called Bjarkøy Church. At that point, there was no longer a Sandsøy Church, but the residents wanted a church on their island, so they built a new Sandsøy Church in 1888. That building is still in use as the Sandsøy Church.

== See also ==
- List of churches in Nord-Hålogaland
