= Torfinn Bjarkøy =

Norwegian civil servant (1952–2022)

Torfinn Bjarkøy (27 July 1952 – 7 October 2022) was a Norwegian civil servant.

He was born in Narvik. He served as the Norwegian Consumer Ombudsman from 1995 to 2000, having previously worked as a sub-director for the ombudsman from 1989. He died in Bærum Municipality in October 2022.

Civic offices
Preceded by Kjersti Graver	Norwegian Consumer Ombudsman; 1995–2000	Succeeded by Bjørn Erik Thon
