= Grytøya =

Island in Harstad Municipality in Troms county, Norway

Grytøya (Norwegian) Rivttek (Northern Sami)
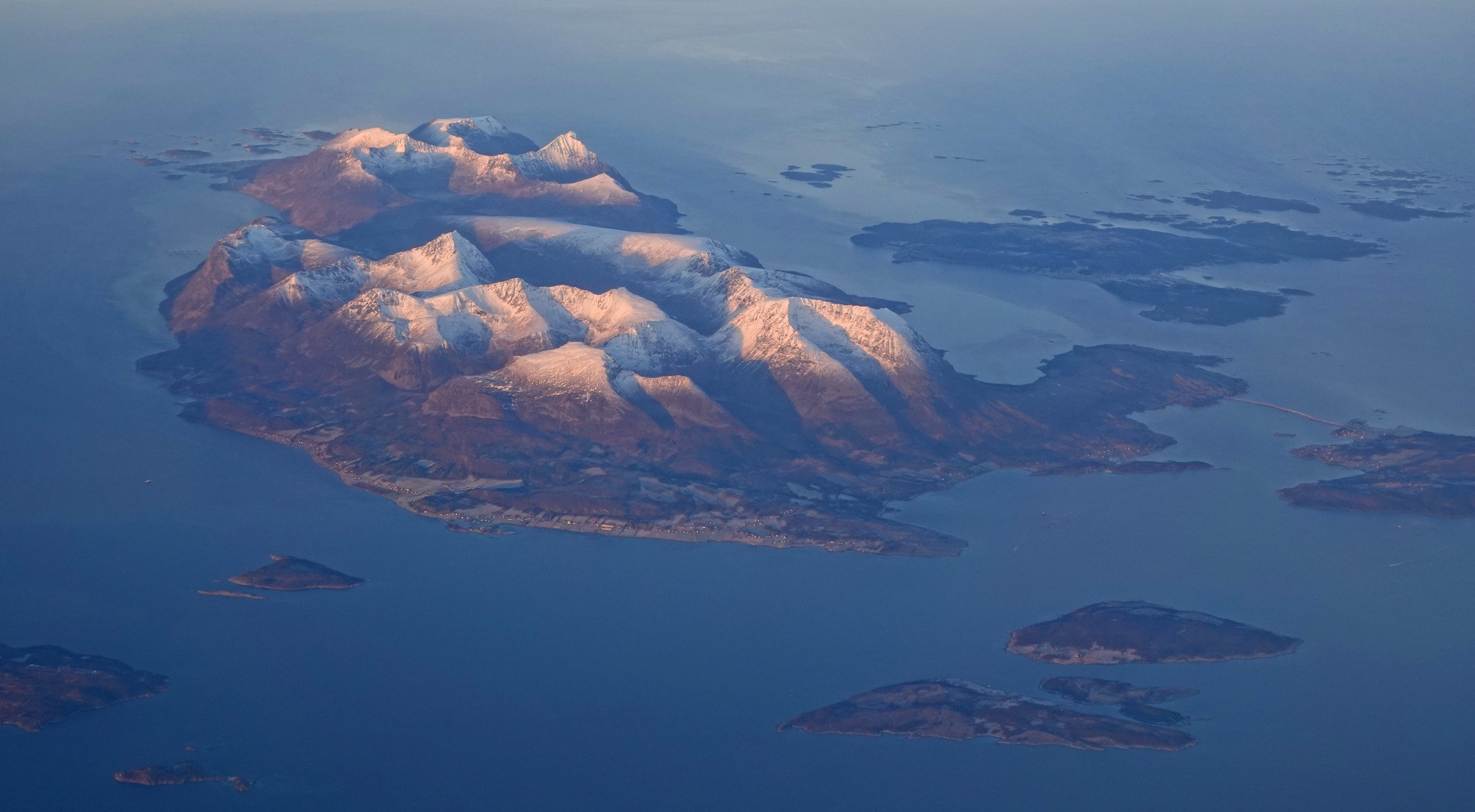
- Grytøya seen from the east
- Interactive map of Grytøya (Norwegian); Rivttek (Northern Sami)

Geography
- Location: Troms, Norway
- Coordinates: 68.9222°N 16.4629°E
- Area: 108 km^{2} (42 sq mi)
- Length: 17 km (10.6 mi)
- Width: 10 km (6 mi)
- Coastline: 62 km (38.5 mi)
- Highest elevation: 1,012 m (3320 ft)
- Highest point: Nona

Administration
- Norway
- County: Troms
- Municipality: Harstad Municipality

Demographics
- Population: 433 (2017)
- Pop. density: 4/km^{2} (10/sq mi)

Grytøya (Norwegian) or Rivttek (Northern Sami) is an island in Harstad Municipality in Troms county, Norway. The 108-square-kilometre (42 sq mi) island lies just north of the large island of Hinnøya and south of the island of Bjarkøya. It is surrounded by the Vågsfjorden in the east and the Andfjorden in the west. The highest peak on the island is the 1,012-metre (3,320 ft) tall mountain Nona. The population of Grytøya (2017) is 433. The southeastern part of the island is the most agriculturally productive.

The northern part of the island was formerly part of the old Bjarkøy Municipality, which merged with Harstad Municipality on 1 January 2013.

== Transportation ==
There is a ferry connection from Bjørnå (on Grytøya) to Vika (on the neighboring island of Hinnøya), just north of the town of Harstad. The main road on the island follows the coastline from the northeast at Fenes to Grotavær in the northwest. There is very little settlement on the northern coast, and no road connections there.

There used to be ferry connections to the neighboring islands of Bjarkøya and Sandsøya, but the Bjarkøy Fixed Link project created a bridge and undersea tunnel system connecting the three islands in 2018.

== Media gallery ==
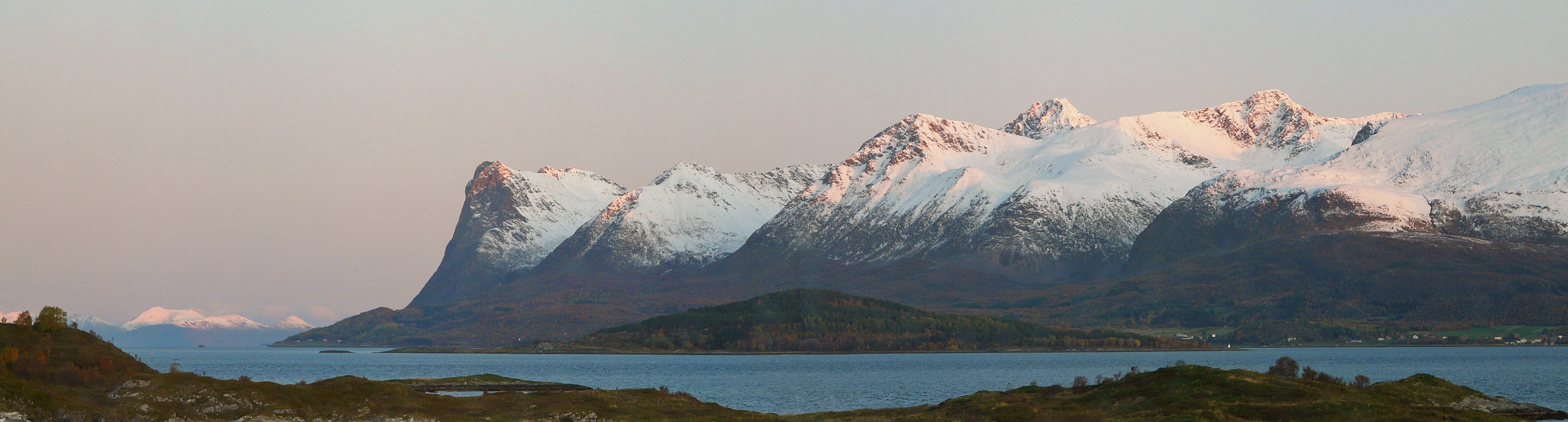
Grytøya, seen from the Southeast

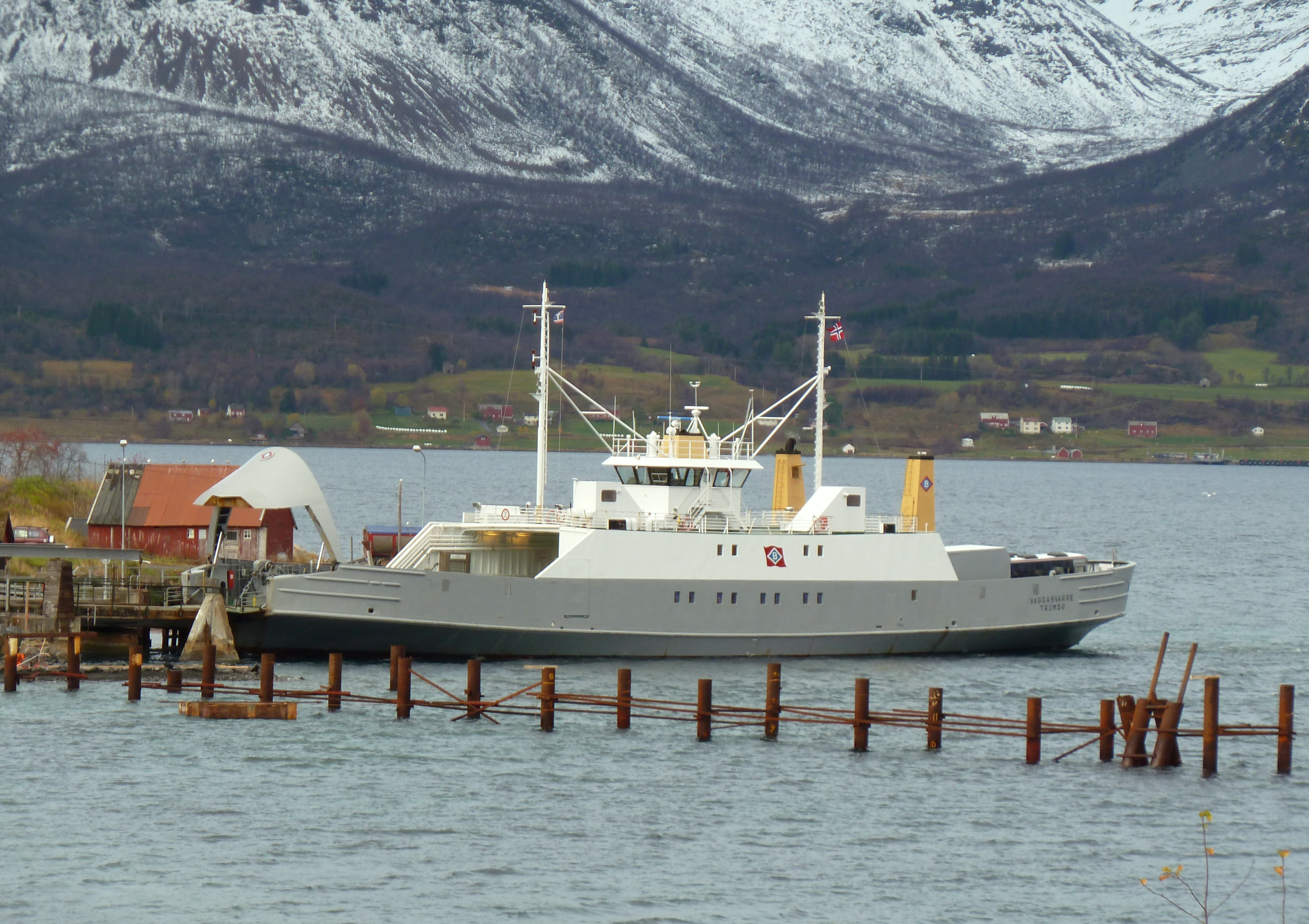
Ferry docked at Grytøya

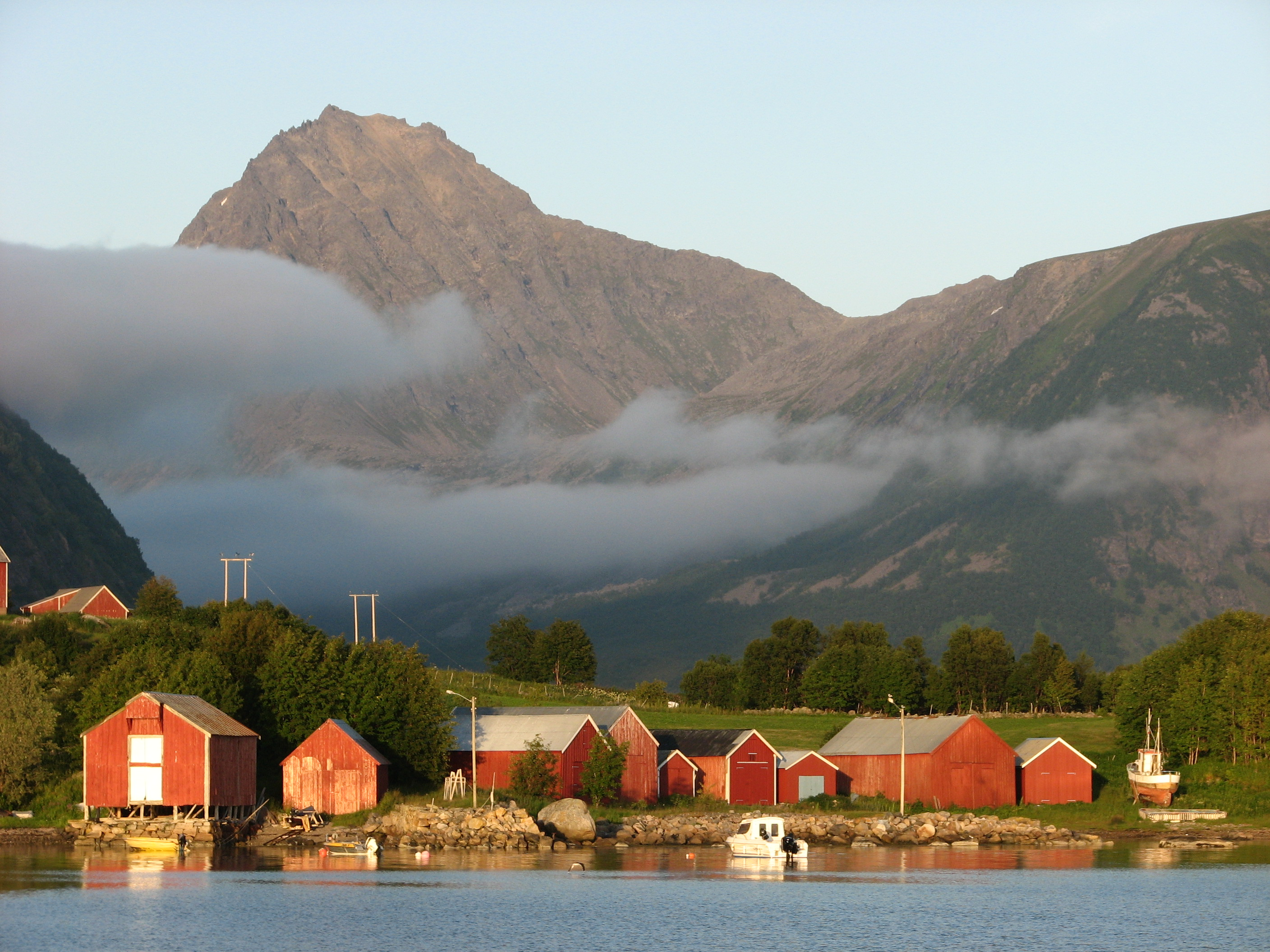
Alvestad on Grytøya

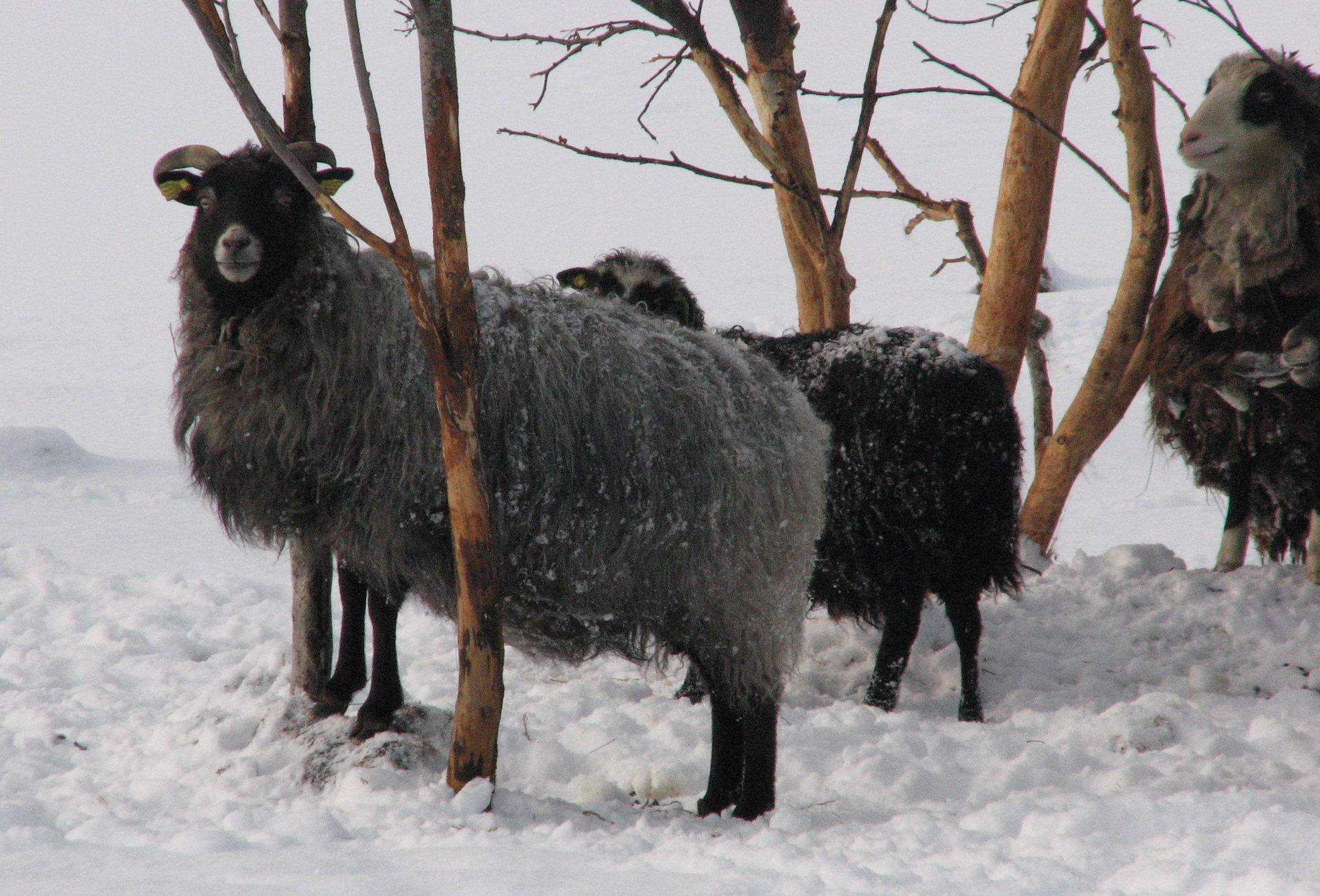
Sheep on Grytøya

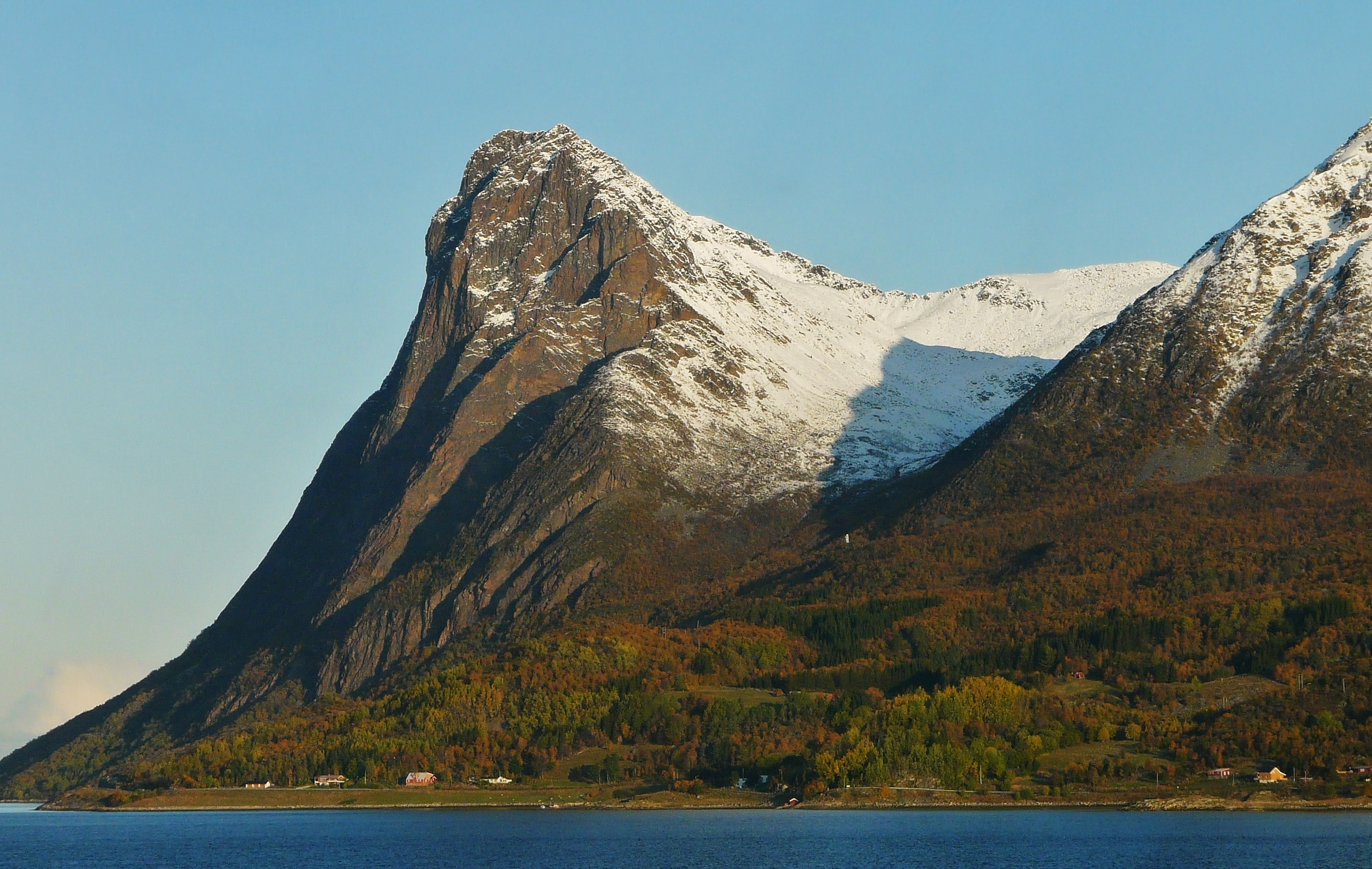
View of Toppen on Grytøya

== See also ==
- List of islands of Norway
