= Georg Apenes =

Norwegian politician and jurist

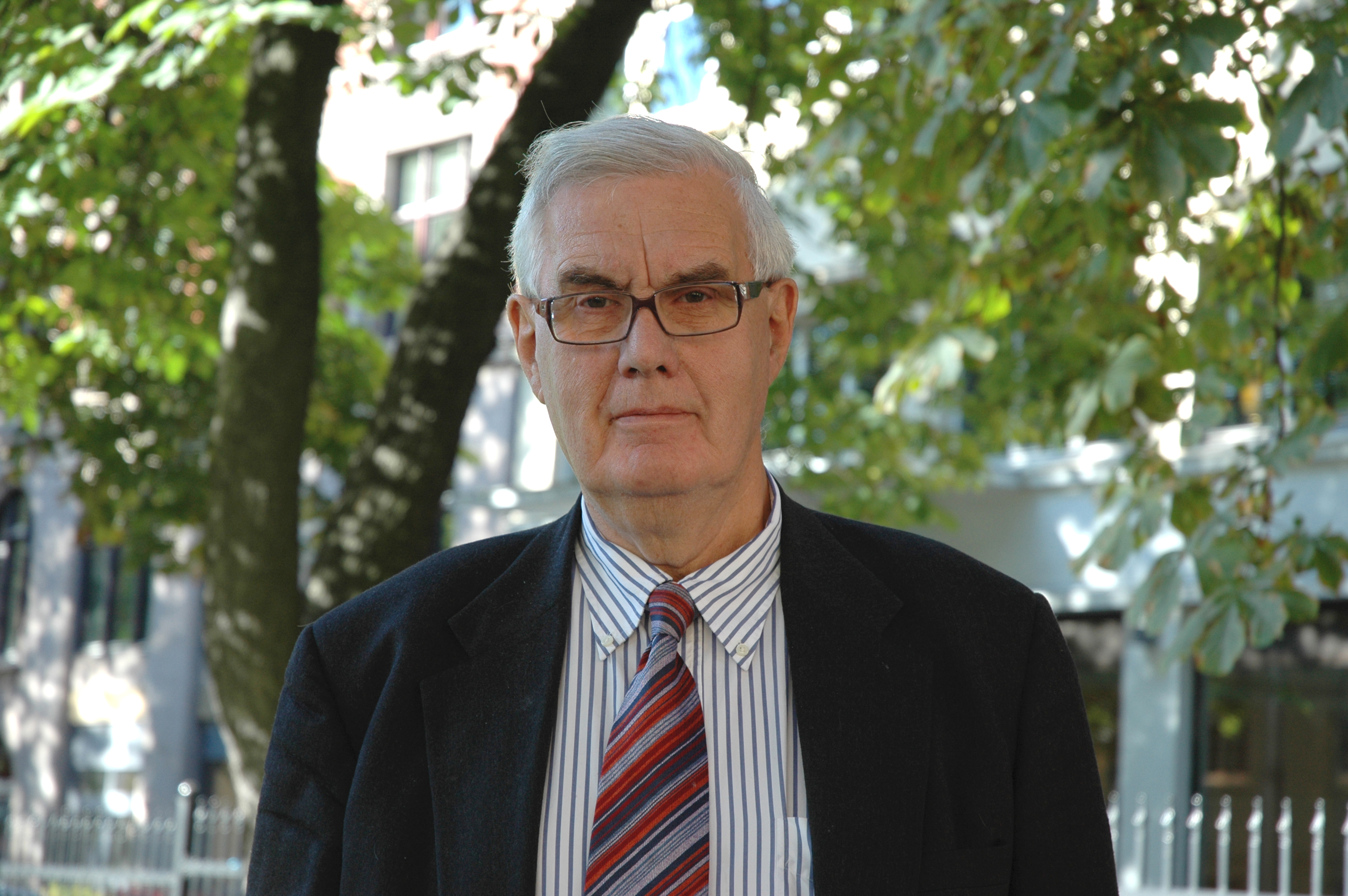
- Born: 5 April 1940; Fredrikstad
- Died: 2 October 2016 (aged 76)
- Occupation: Politician Jurist

Georg Apenes (5 April 1940 – 2 October 2016) was a Norwegian politician and jurist.

== Career ==
Apenes was born in Fredrikstad. After finishing secondary education, he briefly worked as a substitute school teacher in his hometown in 1960 before entering Franklin and Marshall College as a part of the Fulbright Program. He studied there for a year before being enrolled in the Norwegian officers' training school. He finished his studies in 1969, when he graduated with the cand.jur. degree from the University of Oslo. While studying in Oslo he had been chairman of the Norwegian Students' Society during the student-led Protests of 1968.

He then went to Vest-Telemark to work as a deputy judge. While stationed there, he chaired the local Conservative Party chapter in Kviteseid Municipality from 1970 to 1971. He was given a lawyer's license in 1971, but instead became a journalist for his hometown newspaper Fredriksstad Blad. After one year he was promoted to subeditor. He stayed in this job until 1977.

In 1977 he was elected to the Parliament of Norway from Østfold constituency. He was later re-elected in 1981 and 1985 to serve two more terms. Unlike many national politicians, Apenes never held elected positions in local politics.

He was not re-elected to a fourth parliamentary term in 1989; instead he was appointed the new director of the Norwegian Data Inspectorate when Helge Seip reached the age limit of 70 years and stepped down. As director of the Data Inspectorate, Apenes has made a mark in the political debate as a defender of privacy. He has opposed the European Union Directive 2006/24/EC. When commenting on Internet privacy, Apenes deplored the indifference with which people disseminate personally identifiable information. He added that the dystopies described by Aldous Huxley "are probably not that far away". He stepped down in April 2010. Until his successor Bjørn Erik Thon was named in late May, Ove Skåra was acting director.

Georg Apenes has authored several books, with topics spanning from monographies on political themes and analysis of political parties to festschrifts and amateur history. In addition, he has written columns in the newspapers Fredriksstad Blad, Stavanger Aftenblad, Dagens Næringsliv and A-Magasinet.

== Personal life ==
He was the son of district stipendiary magistrate (sorenskriver) Christian B. Apenes and housewife Inger-Johanne Apenes, née Framholdt Johansen. Inger-Johanne Apenes was murdered in 1978. The case was unsolved, until 2007 when someone confessed to the murder. By that time, however, the case was juridically obsolete. Georg Apenes is also a nephew of engineer and archaeologist Ola Apenes.

Government offices
Preceded by Helge Seip	Director of the Norwegian Data Inspectorate; 1989–2010	Succeeded by Ove Skåra (acting)
