= Bjarkøy Church =

- Bjarkøy kirke
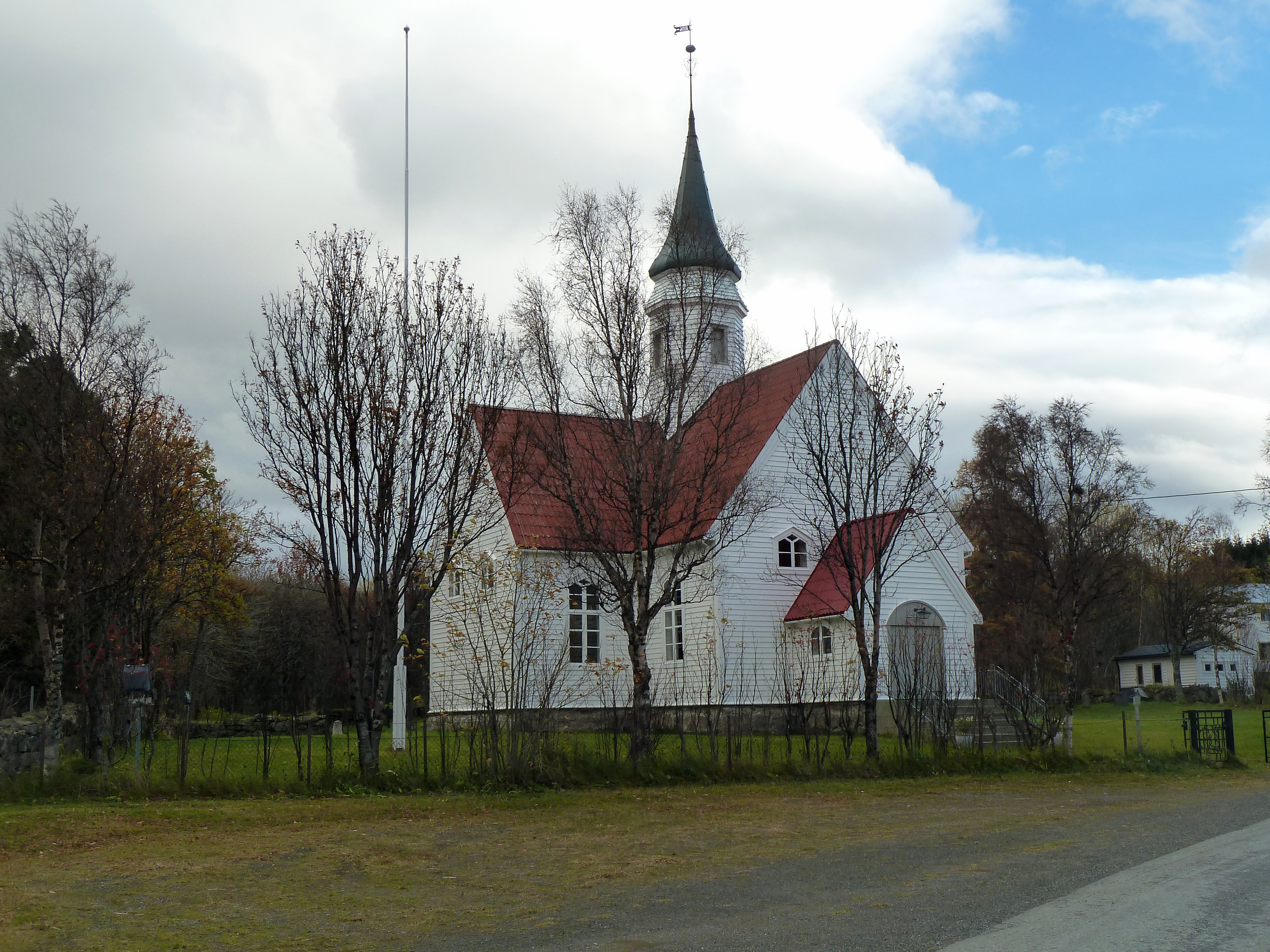
- View of the church
- Bjarkøy Church
- 68.995372°N 16.5434280°E
- Location: Harstad Municipality, Troms
- Country: Norway
- Denomination: Church of Norway
- Churchmanship: Evangelical Lutheran

History
- Status: Parish church
- Founded: 13th century
- Consecrated: 8 Dec 1886
- Events: Moved from Sandsøya to Bjarkøya in 1886

Architecture
- Functional status: Active
- Architectural type: Cruciform
- Completed: 1886 (140 years ago)

Specifications
- Capacity: 350
- Materials: Wood

Administration
- Diocese: Nord-Hålogaland
- Deanery: Trondenes prosti
- Parish: Vågsfjord
- Norwegian Cultural Heritage Site
- Type: Church
- Status: Listed
- ID: 83893

Bjarkøy Church (Norwegian: Bjarkøy kirke) is a parish church of the Church of Norway in Harstad Municipality in Troms county, Norway. It is located in the village of Nergården on the island of Bjarkøya. It is one of the churches for the Vågsfjord parish which is part of the Trondenes prosti (deanery) in the Diocese of Nord-Hålogaland. The white, wooden church was built in a cruciform style in 1766 using plans drawn up by an unknown architect. The church seats about 350 people.

== History ==
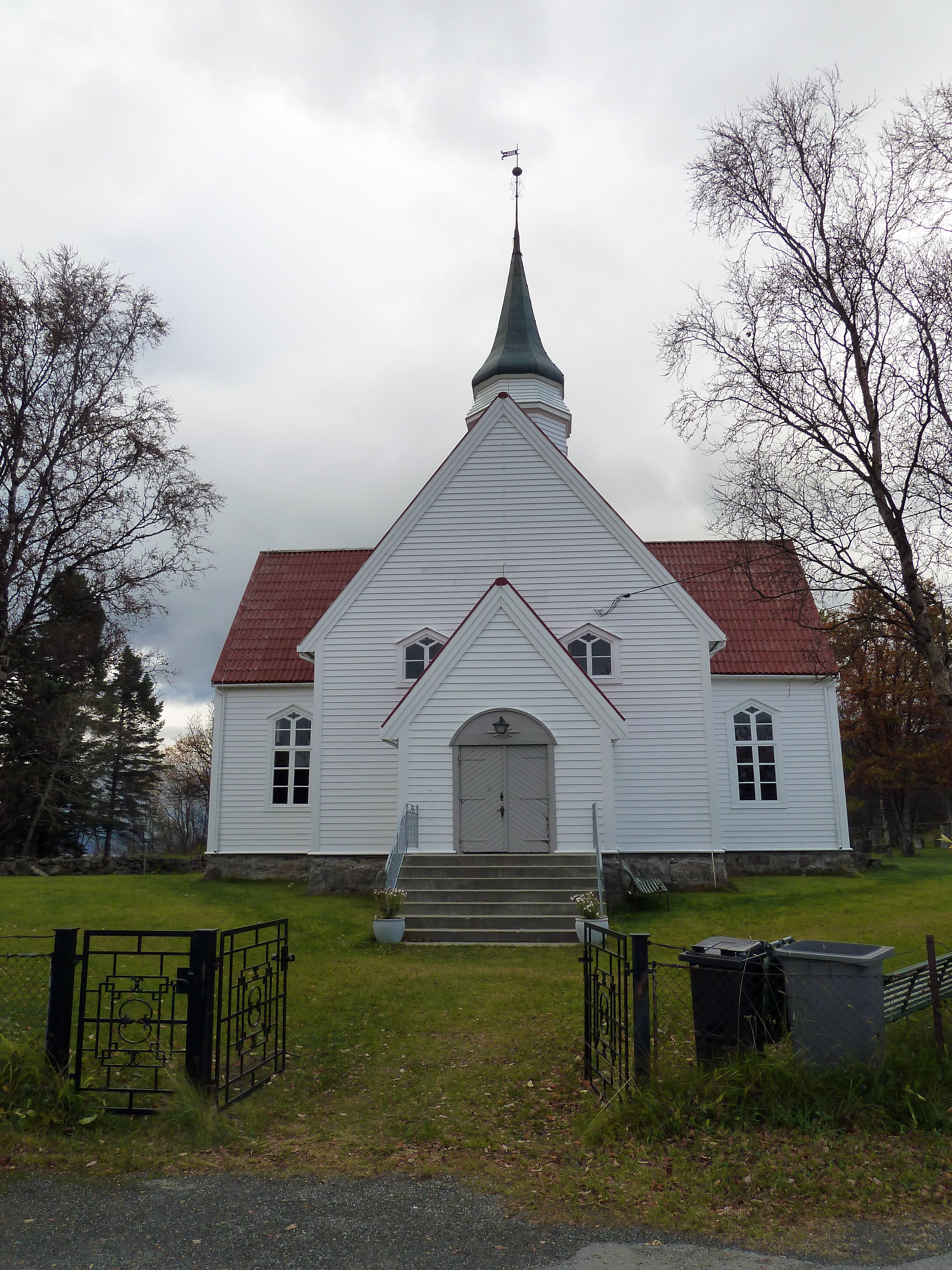
View of the church

The earliest existing historical records of the church date back to the year 1309, but the church was likely built in the 1200s. The location of the church is unknown, but the leading theory is that it was in Øvergård, a short distance southwest of the present church building. Tradition states that the church stood until some time in the 1800s.

In 1814, this church served as an election church (Norwegian: valgkirke). Together with more than 300 other parish churches across Norway, it was a polling station for elections to the 1814 Norwegian Constituent Assembly which wrote the Constitution of Norway. This was Norway's first national elections. Each church parish was a constituency that elected people called "electors" who later met together in each county to elect the representatives for the assembly that was to meet at Eidsvoll Manor later that year.

In the 1880s, it was decided to close the nearby Sandsøy Church and move that building to Bjarkøya. The wooden Sandsøy Church was originally built in 1766 on the island of Sandsøya. In July 1886, that church was disassembled and moved to the Nergården area on the island of Bjarkøya where it was reassembled. It became known as Bjarkøy Church after it was moved. The newly rebuilt church was consecrated on 8 December 1886. The island of Sandsøya received a new church in 1888.

== See also ==
- List of churches in Nord-Hålogaland
