= Borgarsyssel Museum =

Museum in Sarpsborg, Norway

Coordinates: 59.2784°N 11.1237°E

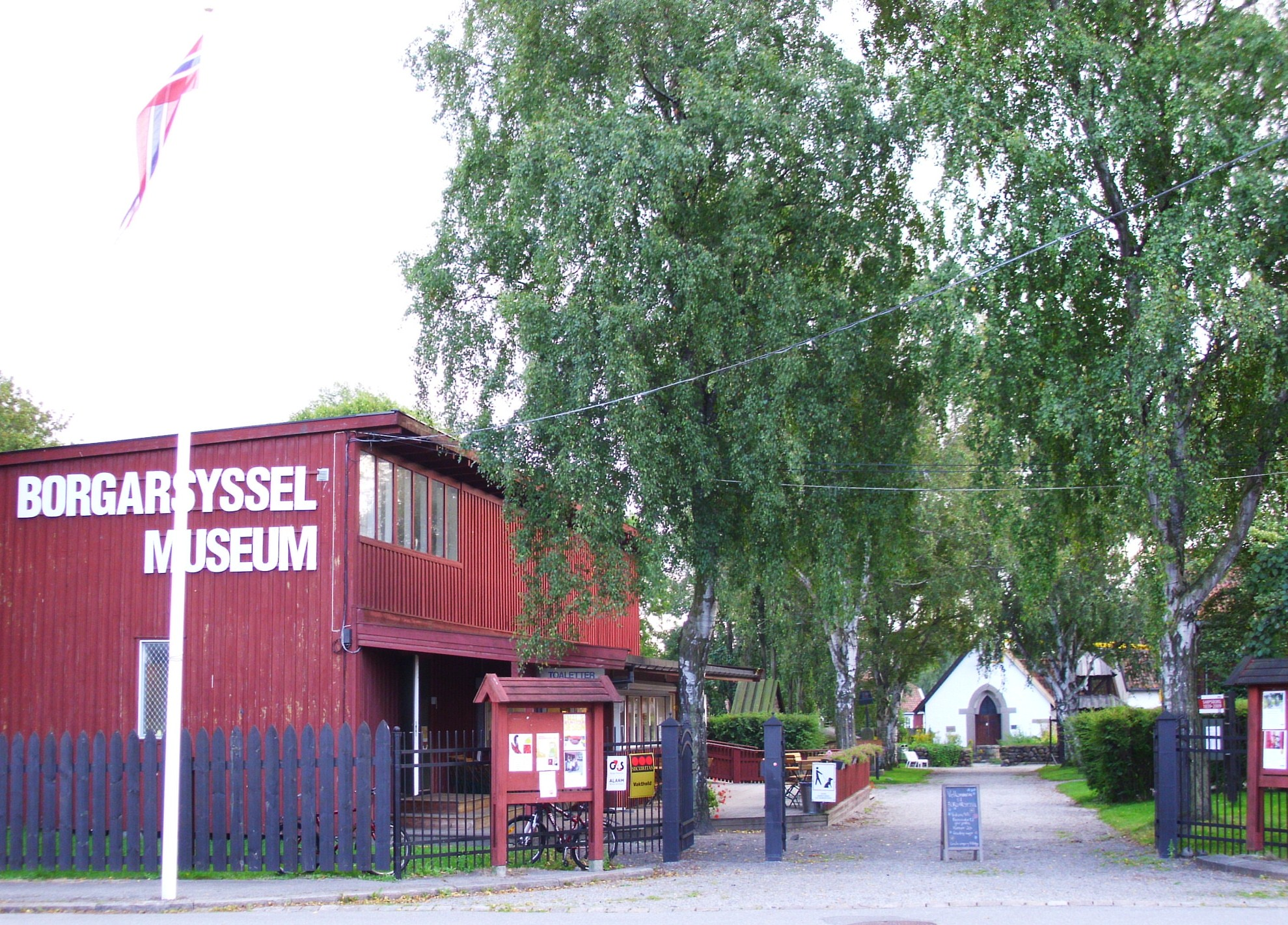
The Borgarsyssel Museum at Sarpsborg

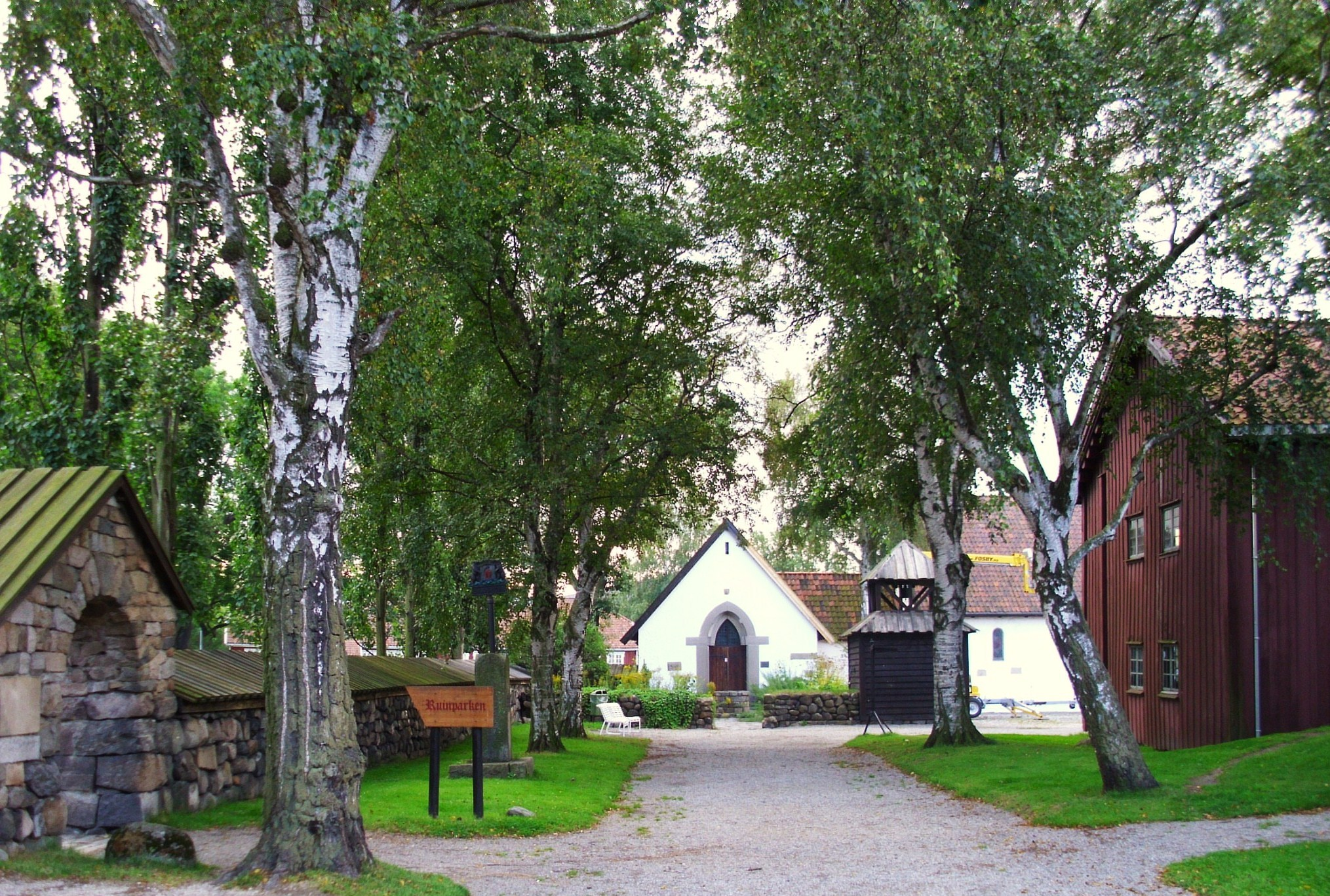
The main entrance of the Borgarsyssel Museum

The Borgarsyssel Museum is a museum located at Sarpsborg in Østfold county, Norway. The museum was named after Borgarsysla, the Old Norse name of Østfold county.

It was founded in 1921 and documents Østfold's cultural history from the Middle Ages. The open-air collection includes about twenty historic buildings. It is located at the site of the ruins of the Medieval St. Nicholas's Church, which was built during the reign of King Øystein (1103–1123). Olaf's Chapel was built at the Borgarsyssel Museum as an exhibition hall for the Saint Olaf Jubilee (Olavsjubileet) in 1930.

Since 1947, the Borgarsyssel Museum has been the main county museum of Østfold. Since 1 January 2006 it has been a part of the Østfold Museum (Østfoldmuseet), which coordinates all museums in the county.

== Gallery ==
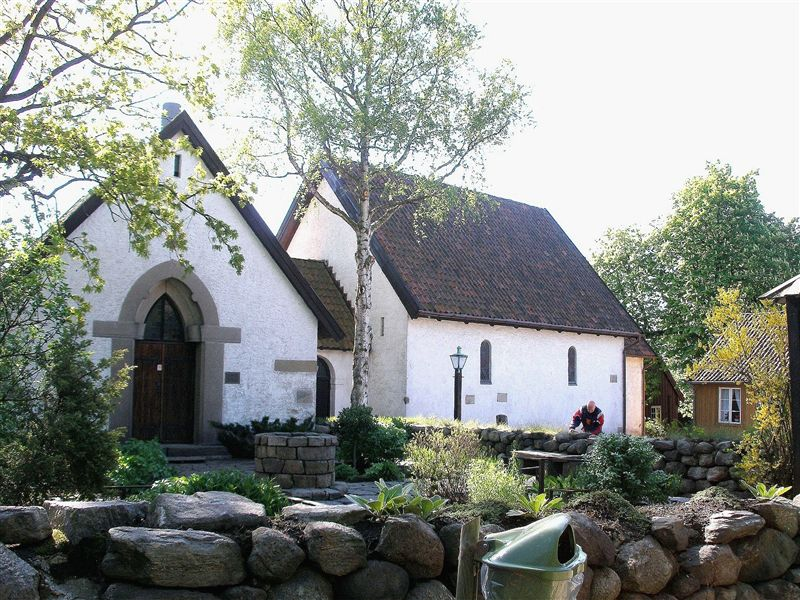
Olaf's Chapel at the Borgarsyssel Museum

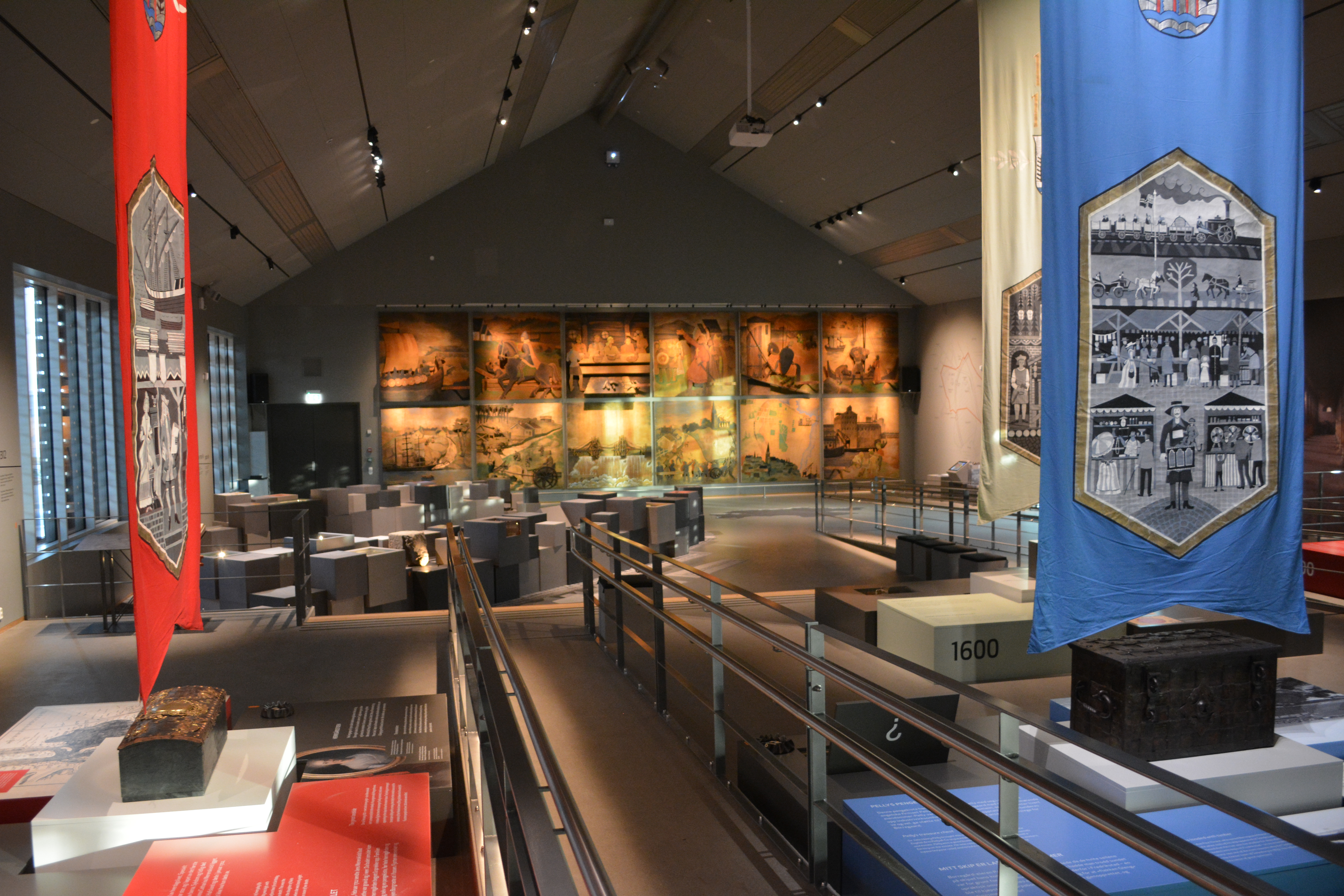
Interior of Olaf's Chapel

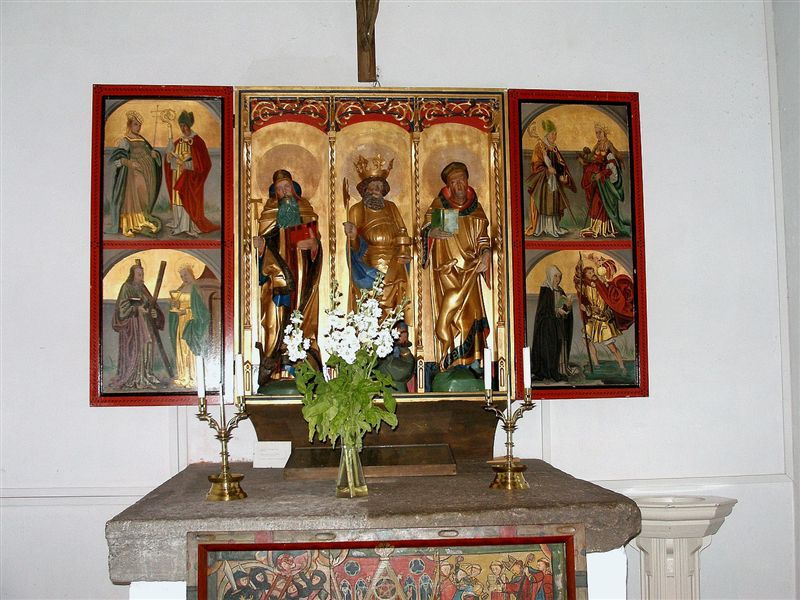
Altar at the Borgarsyssel Museum

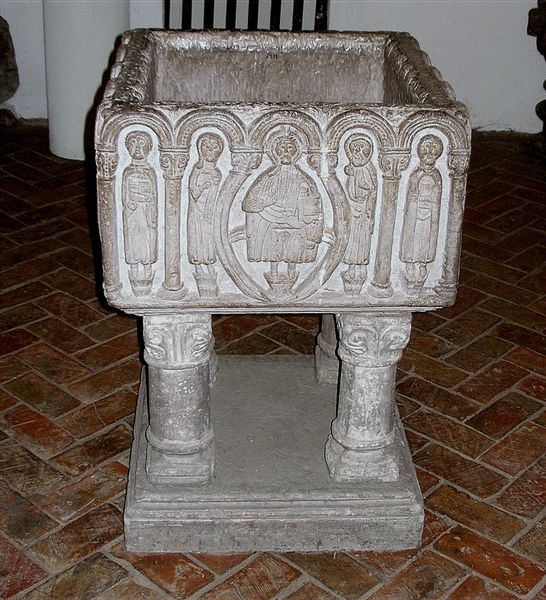
Replica of the Medieval font from Skjeberg Church

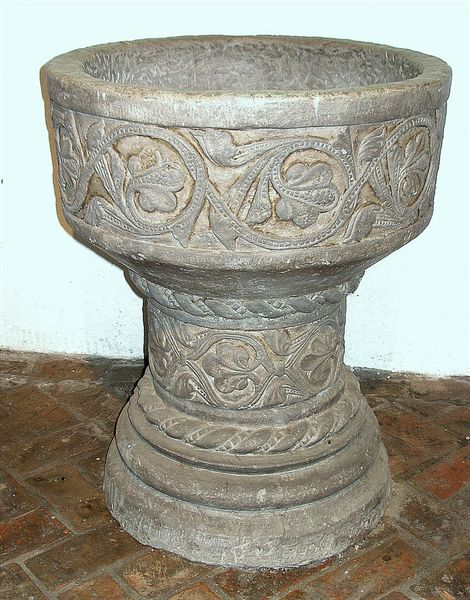
Replica of Medieval font from Eidsberg Church
