= Nergården =

Village in Harstad Municipality, Norway

Nergården Nergård
- Village
- Interactive map of Nergården
- Location within Troms Location within Norway
- Coordinates: 68°59′51″N 16°32′08″E
- Country: Norway
- Region: Northern Norway
- County: Troms
- District: Central Hålogaland
- Municipality: Harstad Municipality
- Elevation: 8 m (26 ft)
- Time zone: UTC+01:00 (CET)
  - Summer (DST): UTC+02:00 (CEST)
- Post Code: 9426 Bjarkøy

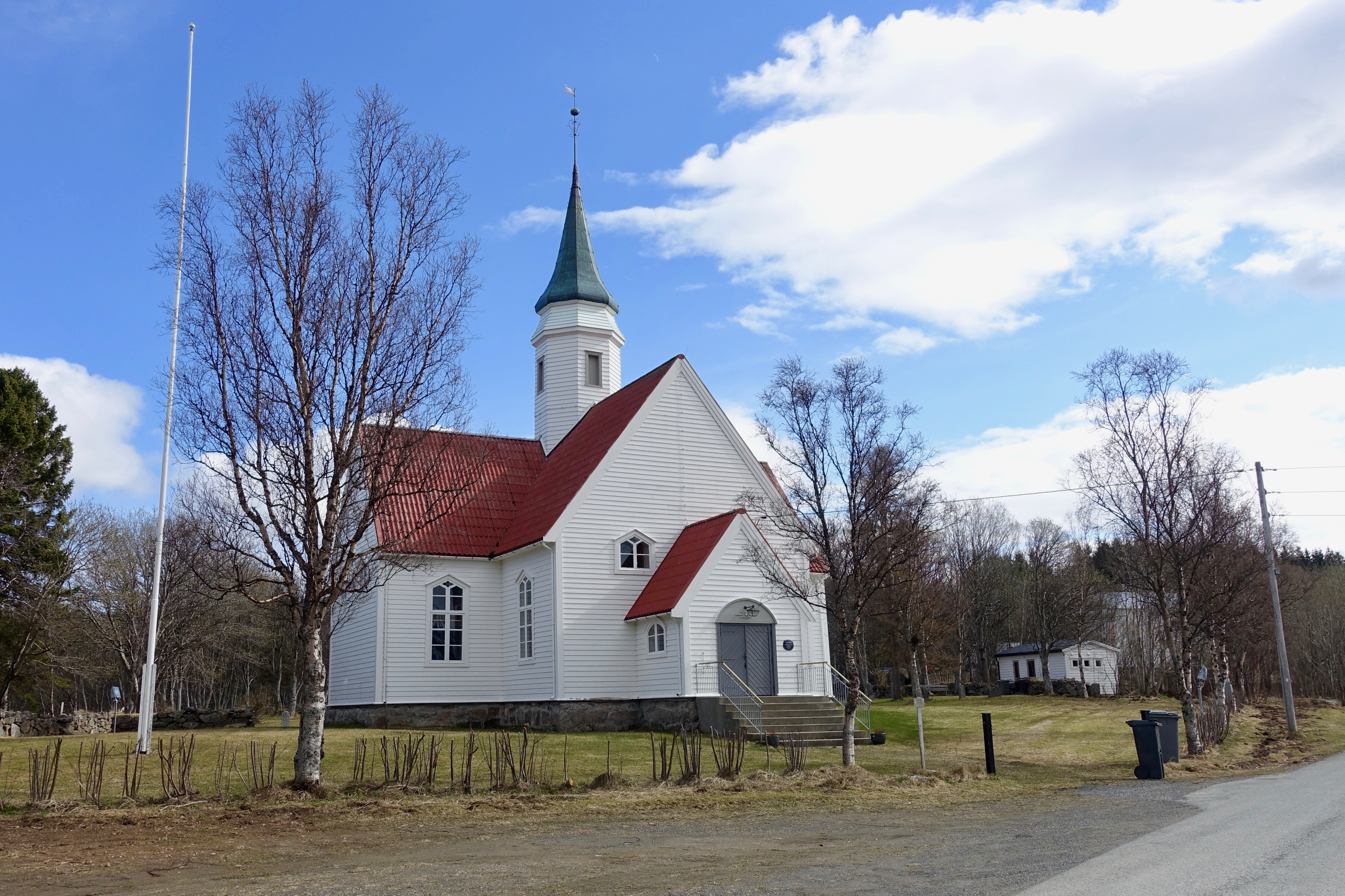
Bjarkøy Church in Nergården

Nergården is a village in the northern part of Harstad Municipality in Troms county, Norway. It is located on the eastern part of the island of Bjarkøya. The historic Bjarkøy Church is located in the village. The village was the administrative centre of the old Bjarkøy Municipality until 2013 when it was merged into Harstad Municipality.
