= Bjarkøy Fixed Link =

Bridge and tunnel in Harstad, Norway

Coordinates: 68°58′29″N 16°34′34″E

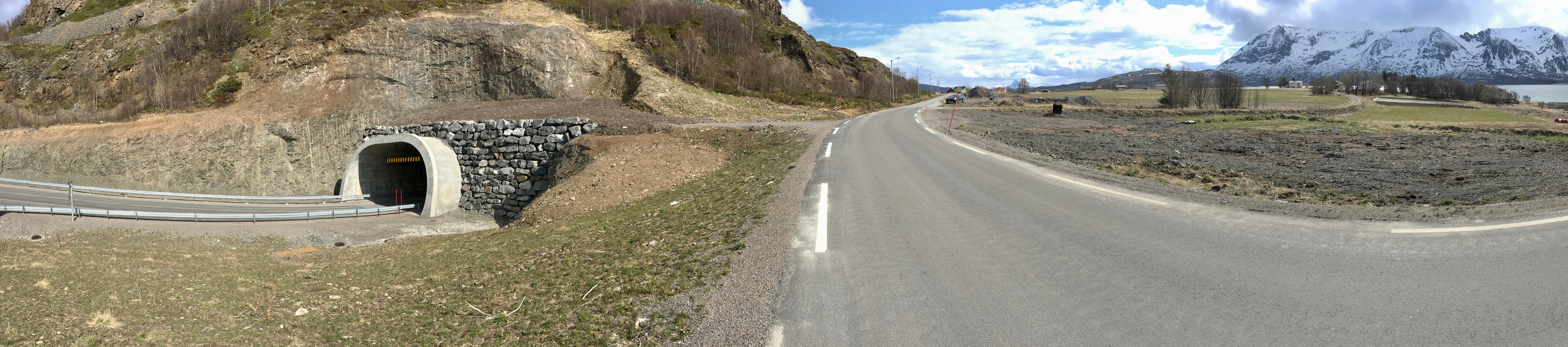
The Bjarkøy portal of Kvernsundtunnelen.

The Bjarkøy Fixed Link (Norwegian: Bjarkøyforbindelsen) is a fixed link which connects the three islands of Bjarkøya, Sandsøya, and Grytøya in Harstad Municipality in Troms county, Norway. The fixed link was completed in late 2018. A subsea road tunnel (Norwegian: Kvernsundtunnelen) connects the islands of Grytøya and Bjarkøya, and a bridge connects the islands of Grytøya and Sandsøya. The tunnel to Bjarkøya is 3.25 kilometres (2.02 mi) long. The bridge to Grytøya is 300 metres (980 ft) long plus a 900-metre (3,000 ft) long causeway. The project also included 3 kilometres (1.9 mi) of new road on Grytøya to connect the existing roads to the new undersea tunnel. The Bjarkøy Tunnel is designated as part of Norwegian County Road 867, while the Sandsøya Bridge is part of Norwegian County Road 124.

== History ==
The former municipality of Bjarkøy had a population of about 500 people. In a referendum in 2002, the residents voted to merge with the much larger neighboring Harstad Municipality if the fixed link was built, but since less than two-thirds of the vote approved it, it was not a binding vote. After further discussions, the municipalities were merged on 1 January 2013. The financing of the project is based on financing from tolls, saved subsidies to the ferry operations, the savings of 100 million kr needed to build new ferry quays if the ferry service had continued, money saved through the municipal merger, and grants from Troms County Municipality. The total cost was then estimated at 710 million kr with a tentative completion date of 2016.

== Construction ==
Construction began in late 2014, and as of October 2015 the Bjarkøy tunnel bore reached 1,000 metres (3,300 ft) from Grytøya. In July 2016, weaknesses in the sea floor rock which threatened the flooding of the tunnel led to the reporting of an increased cost projection in excess of 962 million kr. In July 2017, asphalting of the road surface inside the tunnel commenced with the projected completion date revised to autumn 2018. The tunnel was formally opened on 15 December 2018 at a final cost of 1150 million kr.
