= Chimalhuacán (archaeological site) =

Archaeological site in Mexico State, Mexico

Coordinates: 19°25′N 98°54′W

Chimalhuacán (Spanish: [tʃimalwaˈkan]) is an archeological site located in the city and municipality of Chimalhuacán Atenco in the eastern part of Mexico State, Mexico. It lies just outside the northeast border of the Federal District (Distrito Federal). The name derives from the Nahuatl words “chimalli” (shield), hua (possession particle) and can (place), this would mean "Place of Shields".The ancient name of the city by its founders was “Chimalhuacantoyac”.The word Atenco, is also Nahuatl; A, “water”; tentli, “lip” and co, “place”, hence would mean “at the water side”.

The Chimalhuacán glyph appears on the Quinatzin codex, symbolizing a round shield on a hill, has an alternative interpretation, the name Chimalltepetl = "Hill shields" or "shields site"; most probably referring to the "Chimalhuache" hill, mountain located within the municipality and near the site.

It is considered one of the cradles of Mesoamerican civilization due to the finding in 1984, of the "Chimalhuacán Man", whose remains are some 12,000 old.

== History ==
The Chimalhuacán Altepetl was founded 1259 by three Tlatoanis (brothers) named Huauxomatl, Chalchiutlatonac and Tlatzcantecuhtli. These tlatoanis and their people originated from Tula and Colhuacan. They spoke Chichimec y Mexica languages; since their ancestors were Acolhua and Mexica, but with time their customs merged and Nahuatl became the dominant language. Chimalhuacán was one of the Texcoco Altépetl, thus belonged to the Aztec Triple Alliance (México, Texcoco y Tlacopan), as of 1431. These villages dominated the territory part of current Mexico.

The site, also known as "Los Pochotes", one of the few late Postclassical period (1200-1521 CE.) known examples of palace architecture in the Basin of Mexico. Although the place was inhabited from the preclassical or Formative, the building, a place or tecpan (Sp), that now can be seen corresponds to the village founded by Chichimec's towards 1250 AD. Chimalhuacán would become an important Texcoco tributary.

== Occupation Stages ==
Chimalhuacán had three main occupation epochs identified:

=== Late Preclassical period ===
Probably founded and originally occupied between 400 and 100 BCE.

=== Classical period ===
There is occupation evidence during the classical period, between 200 and 450 CE.

=== Postclassical period ===
There are two occupation stages reported, during the early (800 to 1000 CE) and late (1100 to 1521 CE) Postclassical

== Relevant historical events ==
Chimalhuacán registered events:

=== Nezahualcóyotl Crowning ===
Before the Netzahualcoyotl crowning as Texcoco Tlatoani, triple alliance troops from Mexico, went to Texcoco and accompanied Netzahualcoyotl, the Tenochtitlan Tlatoani traveled, via de Santa Martha plains, and upon arriving at Chimalhuacán decreed an amnesty for all villages, that belonging to Texcoco, fought against them siding with the Tepaneca, as was the case of Huexotla; the fourth Mexica Tlatoani Itzcoatl (1427–1440) offered pardon in exchange for their surrender, as otherwise allied troops would enter and take their city, Huexotla did not accept the offer and decided to fight, the battle was brief as, Itzcóatl successor, Moctezuma I (1440–1469) took their king prisoner and the troops surrendered shortly thereafter. Finally Netzahualcoyotl was proclaimed Texcoco Tlatoani.

=== Moctezuma I - First Visit ===
Moctezuma I or Moctezuma Ilhuicamina was twice at this town, perhaps due to the closeness of the Texcoco Lake to Tenochtitlan. At a point in time he was taken prisoner by the Chalcas, whom offered his life to Huejotzingo, they rejected the offer. Then he was taken before Maxtla (Tlatoani Tepaneca and last independent governor of the Azcapotzalco Altépetl (1426–1428), with the same purpose, but Maxtla was not interested. Cuateotl freed him and advised him to go back to México via Chimalhuacán.

=== Moctezuma I – Second Visit ===
The second time Moctezuma was when he accompanied Netzahualcoyotl, after their triumph against the Tepaneca.

== Structures ==
The archaeological area approximate covers one hectare. Architectural remains in the area correspond to a residential area of Azteca phase III and it has been determined that it is a governor palace. Spaniards destroyed the Chimalhuacán buildings and city and built their chapels.

=== Structure remains ===
- Three platform Pyramid.
- Ballgame court.
- Stone Serpent

== Pleistocene Traces ==
According to archaeological vestiges, Chimalhuacán formed part of the lacustrine plain of Texcoco Lake, Mammoths and Bison lived on the shores of the lake.

According to the Institute Mexiquense investigator, Maximinio Quintero, Pleistocene (period ending approximately 12,000 years before present) mammoth and other animals remains have been found at Chimalhuacán, man-made lithic utensils, a pre-ceramic skeleton, the best complete and preserved of 38 recovered up to 1984; According to the researcher, it could be the oldest in Mexico.

== Site Museum ==
Chimalhuacán archaeological zone has a site museum, with pleistocene fauna exhibits, and other items.
