= Bjarkøya =

Island in Harstad Municipality in Troms county, Norway

- Interactive map of Bjarkøya

Geography
- Location: Troms, Norway
- Coordinates: 68.9909°N 16.5585°E
- Area: 14.6 km^{2} (5.6 sq mi)
- Length: 5.7 km (3.54 mi)
- Width: 5 km (3.1 mi)
- Highest elevation: 248 m (814 ft)
- Highest point: Falkeberget

Administration
- Norway
- County: Troms
- Municipality: Harstad Municipality

Demographics
- Population: 267 (2017)
- Pop. density: 18.3/km^{2} (47.4/sq mi)

Bjarkøya is an island in Harstad Municipality in Troms county, Norway. The 14.6-square-kilometre (5.6 sq mi) island is located north of the island of Grytøya and northwest of the island of Sandsøya. The Andfjorden lies to the northwest and the Vågsfjorden lies to the southeast. The main church for the island is Bjarkøy Church in the village of Nergården. The island's population (2017) is 267.

The Bjarkøy Tunnel connects the village of Austnes on the southeastern tip of the island to the northeastern tip of the neighboring island of Grytøya. This tunnel is part of the Bjarkøy Fixed Link project that also has a bridge between the islands of Grytøya to Sandsøya. The tunnel and bridge project opened in 2018.

The highest point on the island is the 248-metre (814 ft) tall mountain Falkeberget.

== History ==
Bjarkøya was the main island of the old Bjarkøy Municipality which existed until 2013 when it merged with Harstad Municipality. The administrative centre of Bjarkøy Municipality was the village of Nergården, located on the island.

== See also ==
- List of islands of Norway
