= Norwegian Data Protection Authority =

Agency overview
- Formed: 1980
- Jurisdiction: Norway
- Headquarters: Oslo, Norway
- Employees: 60
- Annual budget: NOK 68 m
- Agency executive: Line Coll, Director
- Website: datatilsynet.no

The Norwegian Data Protection Authority (Norwegian: Datatilsynet) is an agency of the Norwegian Government responsible for managing the Personal Data Act 2000, concerning privacy concerns. This Act replaced the Data Register Act 1978.

The authority is based in Oslo, and is an independent administrative body under the Ministry of Government Administration and Reform. It is the national data protection authority for Norway.

Helge Seip served as its first director from 1980 to 1989, and Georg Apenes served from 1989 to 2010. Ove Skåra served as acting director from April 2010. From May 2010 to April 2022, Bjørn Erik Thon served as director.

On 28 May 2010, Bjørn Erik Thon was appointed as new director.

On 22 April 2022, Line Coll was appointed director.
