= Sandsøya, Troms =

Island in Harstad Municipality in Troms county, Norway

Sandsøya (Norwegian); Sáhtiidsuolu (Northern Sami)
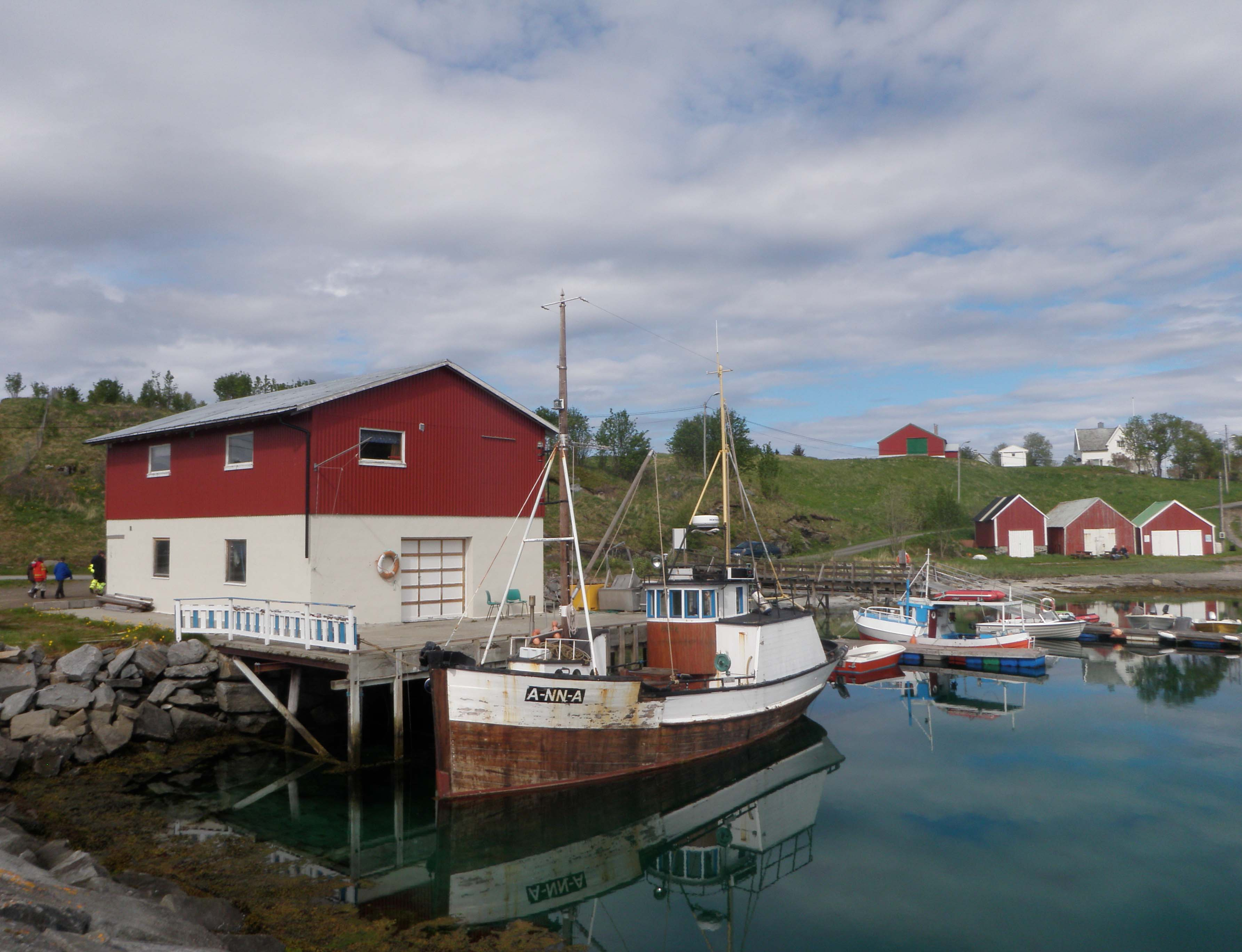
- View of the village harbour in Sandsøy
- Interactive map of: Sandsøya (Norwegian); Sáhtiidsuolu (Northern Sami)

Geography
- Location: Troms, Norway
- Coordinates: 68.9548°N 16.6958°E
- Area: 10.8 km^{2} (4.2 sq mi)
- Length: 5 km (3.1 mi)
- Width: 4.5 km (2.8 mi)
- Highest elevation: 212 m (696 ft)
- Highest point: Veten

Administration
- Norway
- County: Troms
- Municipality: Harstad Municipality

Demographics
- Population: 91 (2017)
- Pop. density: 8.4/km^{2} (21.8/sq mi)

Sandsøya (Norwegian) or Sáhtiidsuolu (Northern Sami) is an island in Harstad Municipality in Troms county, Norway. The 10.8-square-kilometre (4.2 sq mi) island lies east of the island of Grytøya and southeast of the island of Bjarkøya. The highest point on the island is the 212-metre (696 ft) mountain Veten. In 2017, Sandsøya had 91 inhabitants.

The island settlement is a very old trading post and church village. It was part of the old Bjarkøy Municipality which existed until 2013. Sandsøy Church is located on the western side of the island in the village of Sandsøy. The other village on the island is Slakstad on the eastern part of the island.

There was a ferry link that formerly went between Altevik on Sandsøya, Fenes on Grytøya, and Austnes on Bjarkøya. The Bjarkøy Fixed Link replaced the ferry routes linked Sandsøya and Grytøya with a bridge and linked Grytøya and Bjarkøya with an undersea tunnel. The bridge and tunnel opened in 2018. There is also a connection by the Hurtigruten boat from Sandsøya to Harstad, Austnes, and Senja.

== See also ==
- List of islands of Norway
