= Norwegian Consumer Authority =

Government-appointed ombudsman in Norway for consumer affairs

The Norwegian Consumer Authority (Norwegian: Forbrukertilsynet), formerly the Consumer Ombudsman, is an independent administrative body and the public enforcement authority for consumer affairs in Norway.

The office was established in 1973 with Inger Louise Valle as the first holder. It sees to it that the marketing of goods and services is done in accordance with marketing law. Specifically, the authority acts in the interests of consumers to seek to prevent market abuses in conflict with the provisions stipulated in or pursuant to the Norwegian Marketing Control Act.

The Consumer Authority, acting on their own initiative or on the basis of communications from others, encourages all businesspersons to conduct their activities in accordance with the provisions of the Act. They also seeks to ensure that terms and conditions are not used in any way that may harm consumers. The authority received attention internationally since it ruled that the iTunes Music Store's contract terms violates Norwegian consumer and marketing law.

The Consumer Authority handles around 8,500 cases each year, both on its own initiative and stemming from complaints from consumer and business-holders. Decisions by the ombudsman can be appealed to the Norwegian Market Council.
