= List of aircraft carriers of World War II =

This is a list of aircraft carriers of the Second World War.

Aircraft carriers serve as a seagoing airbases, equipped with a flight deck and facilities for carrying, arming, deploying and recovering aircraft. Typically, they are the capital ships of a fleet, as they project air power worldwide without depending on local bases for operational support. Aircraft carriers are expensive and are considered critical assets. By the Second World War aircraft carriers had evolved from converted cruisers, to purpose built vessels of many classes and roles. Fleet carriers were the largest type, operating with the main fleet to provide offensive capability. Light aircraft carriers were fast enough to operate with the fleet but smaller and with fewer aircraft.

Escort carriers were smaller and slower, with low numbers of aircraft, and provided defense for convoys. Most of the latter were built from mercantile hulls or, in the case of merchant aircraft carriers, were bulk cargo ships with a flight deck added on top. Catapult aircraft merchant ships were cargo-carrying merchant ships that could launch (but not retrieve) a single fighter aircraft from a catapult to defend the convoy from long-range German aircraft.

The aircraft carrier dramatically changed naval combat in the war, as air power became a significant factor in warfare. The advent of aircraft as primary weapons was driven by the superior range, flexibility and effectiveness of carrier-launched aircraft. They had higher range and precision than naval guns, making them highly effective. The versatility of the carrier was demonstrated in November 1940 when HMS Illustrious launched a long-range strike on the Italian fleet at their base in Taranto, signalling the beginning of effective and highly mobile aircraft strikes. This operation incapacitated three of the six battleships at a cost of two torpedo bombers.

In the Pacific Ocean clashes occurred between aircraft carrier fleets. The 1941 Japanese surprise attack on Pearl Harbor was a clear illustration of the power projection capability afforded by a large force of modern carriers. Concentrating six carriers in a single unit turned naval history about, as no other nation had fielded anything comparable. However, the vulnerability of carriers compared to traditional battleships when forced into a gun-range encounter was quickly illustrated by the sinking of HMS Glorious by German battleships during the Norwegian campaign in 1940.

This new-found importance of naval aviation forced nations to create a number of carriers, in an effort to provide air superiority for every major fleet. This extensive usage required the construction of several new 'light' carriers. Escort aircraft carriers, such as USS Bogue, were sometimes purpose-built, but most were converted from merchant ships as a stop-gap measure to provide anti-submarine air support for convoys and amphibious invasions. Following this concept, light aircraft carriers built by the US, such as USS Independence, represented a larger and more "militarized" version of the escort carrier. Although with complements similar to escort carriers, they had the advantage of speed from their converted cruiser hulls. The British 1942 Design Light Fleet Carrier was designed for quick construction by civilian shipyards and a short three-year service life. They served the Royal Navy during the war, and their hull design was chosen for nearly all aircraft carrier equipped navies after the war until the 1980s. Emergency situations during the war spurred the creation of highly unconventional aircraft carriers, such as the CAM ships.

The List of ships of World War II contains major military vessels of the war, arranged alphabetically and by type. The list includes armed vessels that served during the war and in the immediate aftermath, inclusive of localized ongoing combat operations, garrison surrenders, post-surrender occupation, colony re-occupation, troop and prisoner repatriation, to the end of 1945. For smaller vessels, see also List of World War II ships of less than 1000 tons. Some uncompleted Axis ships are included, out of historic interest. Ships are designated to the country under which they operated for the longest period of World War II, regardless of where they were built or previous service history.

== List of ships ==
List of aircraft carriers of World War II
Ship	Operator	Class	Type	Displacement (tons)	First commissioned	Fate
Admiralty Islands	United States Navy	Casablanca	escort carrier	8,188	13 June 1944	scrapped 1947
Adula	Royal Navy	Rapana	merchant aircraft carrier	16,000	1 February 1944	returned to merchant service post-war
Akagi	Imperial Japanese Navy	Amagi	fleet carrier	36,500	27 March 1927	sunk 5 June 1942
Akitsu Maru	Imperial Japanese Army	Type C	landing craft carrier	11,800	30 January 1942	sunk 15 November 1944
Albatross	Royal Navy		seaplane carrier	6,350	29 September 1938	torpedoed 1944, not repaired, scrapped 1954
Alexia	Royal Navy	Rapana	merchant aircraft carrier	8,010	1 December 1943	returned to merchant service post-war
Altamaha	United States Navy	Bogue	escort carrier	7,800	15 September 1942	scrapped 1946
Amagi	Imperial Japanese Navy	Unryū	fleet carrier	17,150	10 August 1944	sunk 27 July 1945
Amastra	Royal Navy	Rapana	merchant aircraft carrier	16,000	1 September 1943	scrapped 1955
Ameer	Royal Navy	Ruler	escort carrier	7,800	20 July 1943	paid off 20 March 1946, scrapped 1969
Ancylus	Royal Navy	Rapana	merchant aircraft carrier	16,000	October 1943	scrapped 1954
Antietam	United States Navy	Essex	fleet carrier	30,800	28 January 1945	decommissioned 8 May 1963, scrapped 1974
Aquila	Regia Marina	ex-SS Roma	fleet carrier	23,500		not completed, scrapped 1952
Arbiter	Royal Navy	Ruler	escort carrier	7,800	31 December 1943	paid off 12 April 1946, scrapped 1972
Archer	Royal Navy	Long Island	escort carrier	8,200	17 November 1941	paid off 6 November 1943, scrapped 1962
Argus	Royal Navy	ex-SS Conte Rosso	light aircraft carrier	14,860	1 September 1918	scrapped 1946
Ariguani	Royal Navy	Pegasus	fighter catapult ship		1940	Damaged 1943, returned to merchant service
Ark Royal	Royal Navy	Ark Royal	fleet carrier	22,000	16 December 1938	sunk 14 November 1941
Atheling	Royal Navy	Ruler	escort carrier	7,800	28 October 1943	paid off 6 December 1946, scrapped 1967
Attacker	Royal Navy	Attacker	escort carrier	7,800	30 September 1942	paid off 5 January 1946, scrapped 24 May 1980
Attu	United States Navy	Casablanca	escort carrier	8,188	30 June 1944	scrapped 1947
Audacity	Royal Navy	ex-SS Hannover	escort carrier	11,000	20 June 1941	sunk 21 December 1941
Avenger	Royal Navy	Avenger	escort carrier	8,200	2 March 1942	sunk 15 November 1942
Bairoko	United States Navy	Commencement Bay	escort carrier	10,900	16 July 1945	decommissioned 1955, scrapped 1960
Barnes	United States Navy	Bogue	escort carrier	7,800	20 February 1943	decommissioned 29 August 1946, scrapped 1959
Bataan	United States Navy	Independence	light aircraft carrier	11,000	17 November 1943	decommissioned 9 April 1954, scrapped 1960
Battler	Royal Navy	Attacker	escort carrier	7,800	31 October 1942	paid off 12 February 1946, scrapped 14 May 1946
Béarn	French Navy; Free French Naval Forces	Normandie	fleet carrier	22,150	1 May 1927	struck November 1966, scrapped March 1967
Begum	Royal Navy	Ruler	escort carrier	7,800	2 August 1943	paid off 20 March 1946, scrapped 1974
Belleau Wood	United States Navy	Independence	light aircraft carrier	11,000	31 March 1943	decommissioned 13 January 1947, scrapped 1961
Bennington	United States Navy	Essex	fleet carrier	30,800	6 August 1944	decommissioned 15 January 1970, scrapped 1994
Bismarck Sea	United States Navy	Casablanca	escort carrier	8,188	20 May 1944	sunk 21 February 1945
Biter	Royal Navy; French Navy	Avenger	escort carrier	8,200	5 May 1942	transferred to France as Dixmude 1945
Block Island (CVE-21)	United States Navy	Bogue	escort carrier	7,800	8 March 1943	sunk 29 May 1944
Block Island (CVE-106)	United States Navy	Commencement Bay	escort carrier	10,900	30 December 1944	decommissioned 1954, scrapped 1960
Bogue	United States Navy	Bogue	escort carrier	7,800	26 September 1942	decommissioned 30 November 1946, scrapped 1960
Bon Homme Richard	United States Navy	Essex	fleet carrier	30,800	26 November 1944	decommissioned 2 July 1971, scrapped 1992
Bougainville	United States Navy	Casablanca	escort carrier	8,188	18 June 1944	decommissioned 1946, scrapped 1960
Boxer	United States Navy	Essex	fleet carrier	30,800	16 April 1945	decommissioned 1 December 1969, scrapped 1971
Breton	United States Navy	Bogue	escort carrier	7,800	12 April 1943	decommissioned 1946, scrapped 1972
Bunker Hill	United States Navy	Essex	fleet carrier	30,800	24 May 1943	decommissioned 9 January 1947, scrapped 1973
Cabot	United States Navy	Independence	light aircraft carrier	11,000	24 July 1943	decommissioned 21 January 1955, scrapped 2002
Campania	Royal Navy	Nairana	escort carrier	13,000	9 February 1944	paid off 30 December 1945, scrapped 1955
Cape Esperance	United States Navy	Casablanca	escort carrier	8,188	9 April 1944	scrapped 1959
Cape Gloucester	United States Navy	Commencement Bay	escort carrier	10,900	5 March 1945	decommissioned 1946, scrapped 1971
Card	United States Navy	Bogue	escort carrier	7,800	8 November 1942	scrapped 1971
Casablanca	United States Navy	Casablanca	escort carrier	8,188	8 July 1943	decommissioned 10 June 1946, scrapped 1947
Charger	United States Navy	Avenger	escort carrier	8,200	3 March 1942	paid off 15 March 1946, scrapped 1969
Chaser	Royal Navy	Attacker	escort carrier	7,800	9 April 1943	paid off 12 May 1946, sold into merchant service, scrapped 1972/73
Chenango	United States Navy	Sangamon	escort carrier	11,400	19 September 1942	decommissioned 14 August 1946, scrapped 1960
Chigusa Maru	Imperial Japanese Army	Special 2TL Type	escort carrier	15,864		not completed during war, converted to tanker 1945, scrapped June 1963
Chitose	Imperial Japanese Navy	Chitose	light aircraft carrier	11,190	25 July 1938	sunk 25 October 1944
Chiyoda	Imperial Japanese Navy	Chitose	light aircraft carrier	11,190	15 December 1938	sunk 25 October 1944
Chūyō	Imperial Japanese Navy	Taiyō	escort carrier	18,116	25 November 1942	sunk 4 December 1943
Colossus	Royal Navy	Colossus	light aircraft carrier	13,200	16 December 1944	transferred to France, renamed Arromanches 6 August 1946
Commandant Teste	French Navy		seaplane carrier	10,000	18 April 1932	scuttled on 27 November 1942, scrapped 15 May 1950
Commencement Bay	United States Navy	Commencement Bay	escort carrier	10,900	27 November 1944	decommissioned 30 November 1946, scrapped 1971
Copahee	United States Navy	Bogue	escort carrier	7,800	15 June 1942	decommissioned 1946, scrapped 1961
Coral Sea	United States Navy	Casablanca	escort carrier	8,188	27 August 1943	renamed Anzio, decommissioned 1946, scrapped 1959
Core	United States Navy	Bogue	escort carrier	7,800	10 December 1942	decommissioned 1946, scrapped 1971
Corregidor	United States Navy	Casablanca	escort carrier	8,188	31 August 1943	scrapped 1959
Courageous	Royal Navy	Courageous	fleet carrier	22,500	4 November 1916	sunk 17 September 1939
Cowpens	United States Navy	Independence	light aircraft carrier	11,000	28 May 1943	decommissioned 13 January 1947, scrapped 1960
Croatan	United States Navy	Bogue	escort carrier	7,800	28 April 1943	decommissioned 1946, scrapped 1971
Daiju Maru	Imperial Japanese Navy	Special 1TL Type	escort carrier	11,800		laid down 18 December 1944, not completed, converted to merchant ship as Ryūhō Maru 19 October 1949, scrapped May 1964
Dasher	Royal Navy	Avenger	escort carrier	8,200	2 July 1942	sunk 27 March 1943
Dristigheten	Swedish Navy		seaplane carrier	3,445	5 September 1901	paid off 13 June 1947
Eagle	Royal Navy	Almirante Latorre	light aircraft carrier	22,600	26 February 1924	sunk 11 August 1942
Elbe	Kriegsmarine	Jade	escort carrier	17,530		work halted 2 February 1943; seized 20 June 1946, renamed Empire Fowey
Emperor	Royal Navy	Ruler	escort carrier	7,800	6 August 1943	paid off 28 March 1946, scrapped 1946
Empire Activity	Royal Navy	Empire	merchant aircraft carrier	14,250	29 September 1942	Converted to merchant service 20 October 1945; scrapped 24 April 1967
Empire MacAlpine	Royal Navy	Empire	merchant aircraft carrier	8,000	14 April 1943	transferred to merchant service post-war; renamed Derryname
Empire MacAndrew	Royal Navy	Empire	merchant aircraft carrier	8,000	7 July 1943	transferred to merchant service post-war; renamed Derryheen
Empire MacCabe	Royal Navy	Empire	merchant aircraft carrier	9,000	1 December 1943	transferred to merchant service 1946, renamed British Escort
Empire MacCallum	Royal Navy	Empire	merchant aircraft carrier	8,000	22 December 1943	transferred to merchant service post-war; renamed Alpha Zambesi
Empire MacColl	Royal Navy	Empire	merchant aircraft carrier	9,000	1 November 1943	transferred to merchant service 1946, renamed British Pilot
Empire MacDermott	Royal Navy	Empire	merchant aircraft carrier	8,000	31 March 1944	transferred to merchant service post-war; renamed La Cumbre
Empire MacKay	Royal Navy	Empire	merchant aircraft carrier	9,000	5 October 1943	transferred to merchant service 1946, renamed British Swordfish
Empire MacKendrick	Royal Navy	Empire	merchant aircraft carrier	8,000	1 December 1943	transferred to merchant service post-war; renamed Granpond
Empire MacMahon	Royal Navy	Empire	merchant aircraft carrier	9,000	1 December 1943	transferred to merchant service 1946, renamed Naninia
Empire MacRae	Royal Navy	Empire	merchant aircraft carrier	8,000	20 September 1943	returned to merchant service 1947, renamed Alpha Zambesi
Empress	Royal Navy	Ruler	escort carrier	7,800	9 August 1943	paid off 28 March 1946, scrapped 1946
Enterprise	United States Navy	Yorktown	fleet carrier	25,100	12 May 1938	decommissioned 1947, scrapped 1959
Essex	United States Navy	Essex	fleet carrier	30,800	31 December 1942	decommissioned 30 June 1969, scrapped 1975
Fanshaw Bay	United States Navy	Casablanca	escort carrier	8,188	9 December 1943	decommissioned 14 August 1946, scrapped 1959
Fencer	Royal Navy	Attacker	escort carrier	7,800	20 February 1943	paid off 21 December 1945, sold as a merchant ship; scrapped 1975
Flugzeugträger B	Kriegsmarine	Graf Zeppelin	fleet carrier	23,200		not completed, construction halted on 19 September 1939, scrapped 28 February 1940
Formidable	Royal Navy	Illustrious	fleet carrier	23,000	24 November 1940	scrapped 1953
Franklin	United States Navy	Essex	fleet carrier	30,800	31 January 1944	decommissioned 17 February 1947, scrapped 1964
Franklin D. Roosevelt	United States Navy	Midway	fleet carrier	45,000	27 October 1945	decommissioned 30 September 1977, scrapped 3 May 1978
Furious	Royal Navy	Courageous	fleet carrier	22,400	14 October 1917	scrapped 1948
Gadila	Royal Netherlands Navy	Rapana	merchant aircraft carrier	8,000	1 March 1944	returned to merchant service 1946; scrapped 1958
Gambier Bay	United States Navy	Casablanca	escort carrier	8,188	28 December 1943	sunk 25 October 1944
Gilbert Islands	United States Navy	Commencement Bay	escort carrier	10,900	5 February 1945	decommissioned 15 January 1955, scrapped 1 November 1979
Giuseppe Miraglia	Regia Marina	ex-Città di Messina	seaplane carrier	4,965	1 November 1927	decommissioned 15 July 1950
Glorious	Royal Navy	Courageous	fleet carrier	22,500	20 April 1916	sunk 8 June 1940
Glory	Royal Navy	Colossus	light aircraft carrier	13,200	2 April 1945	scrapped August 1961
Graf Zeppelin	Kriegsmarine	Graf Zeppelin	fleet carrier	23,200		launched 8 December 1938, not completed, scuttled 16 August 1947
Guadalcanal	United States Navy	Casablanca	escort carrier	8,188	25 September 1943	decommissioned 15 July 1946, scrapped 1959
Hancock	United States Navy	Essex	fleet carrier	27,100	15 April 1944	sold for scrap, 1 September 1976
Hermes	Royal Navy	Hermes	light aircraft carrier	10,850	7 July 1923	sunk 9 April 1942
Hiryū	Imperial Japanese Navy	Hiryū	fleet carrier	17,300	5 July 1939	sunk 5 June 1942
Hiyō	Imperial Japanese Navy	Hiyō	light aircraft carrier	24,140	31 July 1942	sunk 20 June 1944
Hoggatt Bay	United States Navy	Casablanca	escort carrier	8,188	11 January 1944	decommissioned 20 July 1946, scrapped 1960
Hollandia	United States Navy	Casablanca	escort carrier	8,188	1 June 1944	decommissioned 17 January 1947, scrapped 1961
Hornet (CV-8)	United States Navy	Yorktown	fleet carrier	26,500	25 October 1941	sunk 27 October 1942
Hornet (CV-12)	United States Navy	Essex	fleet carrier	27,100	29 November 1943	decommissioned 26 June 1970; museum ship
Hōshō	Imperial Japanese Navy	Hōshō	light aircraft carrier	7,470	27 December 1922	scrapped 1947
Hunter	Royal Navy	Attacker	escort carrier	7,800	9 January 1943	paid off 17 January 1947, scrapped May 1946
Ibuki	Imperial Japanese Navy	Ibuki	light aircraft carrier	14,600		launched 21 May 1943, not completed, scrapped 22 November 1946
Illustrious	Royal Navy	Illustrious	fleet carrier	30,530	25 May 1940	scrapped 1956
Implacable	Royal Navy	Implacable	fleet carrier	32,624	28 August 1944	scrapped 1955
Indefatigable	Royal Navy	Implacable	fleet carrier	32,110	3 May 1944	scrapped 1956
Independence	United States Navy	Independence	light aircraft carrier	11,000	14 January 1943	decommissioned 28 August 1946, target ship scuttled 1951
Indomitable	Royal Navy	Illustrious	fleet carrier	23,000	10 October 1941	scrapped 1955
Intrepid	United States Navy	Essex	fleet carrier	27,100	16 August 1943	decommissioned 15 March 1974; museum ship
Joffre	French Navy	Joffre	fleet carrier	18,000		laid down 26 November 1938, not completed, construction stopped June 1940
Junyō	Imperial Japanese Navy	Hiyō	light aircraft carrier	26,949	5 May 1942	scrapped 1947
Kadashan Bay	United States Navy	Casablanca	escort carrier	8,188	18 January 1944	decommissioned 14 June 1946, scrapped 1959
Kaga	Imperial Japanese Navy	Tosa	fleet carrier	38,200	1 November 1929	sunk 4 June 1942
Kaiyō	Imperial Japanese Navy	ex-MV Argentina Maru	escort carrier	16,223	23 November 1943	scrapped 1 September 1946
Kalinin Bay	United States Navy	Casablanca	escort carrier	8,188	27 November 1943	decommissioned 15 May 1946, scrapped 1947
Kasaan Bay	United States Navy	Casablanca	escort carrier	8,188	4 December 1943	decommissioned 6 July 1946, scrapped 1960
Katsuragi	Imperial Japanese Navy	Unryū	fleet carrier	22,178	15 October 1944	scrapped 1947
Kumano Maru	Imperial Japanese Army	M Type C	landing craft carrier	8,258	31 March 1945	converted to merchant ship 1947, scrapped 1948
Khedive	Royal Navy	Ruler	escort carrier	7,800	25 August 1943	paid off 19 July 1946, scrapped 1975
Kitkun Bay	United States Navy	Casablanca	escort carrier	8,188	15 December 1943	decommissioned 19 April 1946, scrapped 1947
Kula Gulf	United States Navy	Commencement Bay	escort carrier	10,900	12 May 1945	decommissioned 15 December 1955, scrapped 1971
Kwajalein	United States Navy	Casablanca	escort carrier	8,188	7 June 1944	decommissioned 16 August 1946, scrapped 1961
Lake Champlain	United States Navy	Essex	fleet carrier	27,100	3 June 1945	decommissioned 2 May 1966, scrapped 1972
Langley (CV-1)	United States Navy	ex-USS Jupiter	seaplane carrier	11,500	7 April 1913	sunk 27 February 1942
Langley (CVL-27)	United States Navy	Independence	light aircraft carrier	11,000	31 August 1943	decommissioned 11 February 1947, scrapped 1964
Lexington (CV-2)	United States Navy	Lexington	fleet carrier	33,000	14 December 1927	sunk 8 May 1942
Lexington (CV-16)	United States Navy	Essex	fleet carrier	27,100	17 February 1943	decommissioned 8 November 1991; museum ship
Liscome Bay	United States Navy	Casablanca	escort carrier	8,188	7 August 1943	sunk 24 November 1943
Long Island	United States Navy	Long Island	escort carrier	13,500	2 June 1941	decommissioned 26 March 1946
Lunga Point	United States Navy	Casablanca	escort carrier	8,188	14 May 1944	decommissioned 24 October 1946, scrapped 1960
Macoma	Royal Netherlands Navy	Rapana	merchant aircraft carrier	8,000	1 April 1944	transferred to merchant service post-war
Makassar Strait	United States Navy	Casablanca	escort carrier	8,188	27 April 1944	decommissioned 9 August 1946, scrapped 1961
Makin Island	United States Navy	Casablanca	escort carrier	8,188	9 May 1944	decommissioned 19 April 1946, scrapped 1947
Manila Bay	United States Navy	Casablanca	escort carrier	8,188	5 October 1943	decommissioned 31 July 1946, scrapped 1959
Maplin	Royal Navy	Pegasus	fighter catapult ship			Returned to her owner 1 August 1942 (had been requisitioned by the Admiralty in September 1940)
Marcus Island	United States Navy	Casablanca	escort carrier	8,188	26 January 1944	decommissioned 12 December 1946, scrapped 1960
Matanikau	United States Navy	Casablanca	escort carrier	8,188	22 May 1944	decommissioned 11 October 1946, scrapped 1960
Midway	United States Navy	Midway	fleet carrier	45,000	10 September 1945	decommissioned 11 April 1992; museum ship
Miralda	Royal Navy	Rapana	merchant aircraft carrier	16,000	1 January 1944	returned to merchant service post-war; renamed Marisa
Mizuho	Imperial Japanese Navy		seaplane carrier	10,930	25 February 1939	sunk 2 May 1942
Mission Bay	United States Navy	Casablanca	escort carrier	8,188	13 September 1943	decommissioned 21 February 1947, scrapped 1959
Monterey	United States Navy	Independence	light aircraft carrier	11,000	17 June 1943	decommissioned 16 January 1956, scrapped 1971
Munda	United States Navy	Casablanca	escort carrier	8,188	8 July 1944	decommissioned 26 April 1946, scrapped 1960
Nabob	Royal Navy; Royal Canadian Navy	Ruler	escort carrier	7,800	7 September 1943	crewed by RCN, paid off 10 October 1944, scrapped December 1977
Nairana	Royal Navy	Nairana	escort carrier	14,280	12 December 1943	to Netherlands 23 March 1946, scrapped 1971
Nassau	United States Navy	Bogue	escort carrier	7,800	20 August 1942	decommissioned 28 October 1946, scrapped 1961
Natoma Bay	United States Navy	Casablanca	escort carrier	8,188	14 October 1943	decommissioned 20 May 1946, scrapped 1959
Nehenta Bay	United States Navy	Casablanca	escort carrier	8,188	3 January 1944	decommissioned 15 May 1946, scrapped 1960
Nisshin	Imperial Japanese Navy		seaplane carrier	12,500	27 February 1942	sunk 22 July 1943
Ocean	Royal Navy	Colossus	light aircraft carrier	13,200	8 August 1945	scrapped May 1962
Ommaney Bay	United States Navy	Casablanca	escort carrier	8,188	11 February 1944	scuttled 4 January 1945
Ōtakisan Maru	Imperial Japanese Navy	Special 1TL Type	escort carrier	11,800		launched 14 January 1945, 70% complete, sunk 25 August 1945, scrapped 1948
Patia	Royal Navy	Pegasus	fighter catapult ship			sunk 1941
Patroller	Royal Navy	Ruler	escort carrier	7,800	22 October 1943	paid off 7 February 1947, scrapped February 1974
Pegasus	Royal Navy	Pegasus	seaplane carrier/fighter catapult ship	7,080	10 December 1914	known as HMS Ark Royal until 1934. Used as seaplane training ship and aircraft transport until converted in 1940. Paid off June 1946.
Perseus	Royal Navy	Colossus	aircraft maintenance carrier	13,200	16 December 1944	transferred to France 6 August 1946, renamed Arromanches
Petrof Bay	United States Navy	Casablanca	escort carrier	8,188	18 February 1944	decommissioned 31 July 1955, scrapped 1959
Pioneer	Royal Navy	Colossus	aircraft maintenance carrier	13,200	8 February 1945	scrapped September 1954
Premier	Royal Navy	Ruler	escort carrier	7,800	3 November 1943	paid off 21 May 1946, scrapped 1976
Prince William	United States Navy	Bogue	escort carrier	7,800	9 April 1943	scrapped 1961
Princeton	United States Navy	Independence	light aircraft carrier	11,000	25 February 1943	sunk 24 October 1944
Puget Sound	United States Navy	Commencement Bay	escort carrier	10,900	18 June 1945	decommissioned 18 October 1946, scrapped 10 January 1962
Puncher	Royal Navy; Royal Canadian Navy	Ruler	escort carrier	7,800	5 February 1944	crewed by RCN, paid off 16 February 1946, scrapped 1973
Pursuer	Royal Navy	Attacker	escort carrier	7,800	14 June 1943	returned to USN 12 February 1946, sold for scrap May 1946
Queen	Royal Navy	Ruler	escort carrier	7,800	7 December 1943	paid off July 1947, scrapped 1972
Rajah	Royal Navy	Ruler	escort carrier	7,800	17 January 1944	paid off 7 February 1947, scrapped 1975
Randolph	United States Navy	Essex	fleet carrier	27,100	9 October 1944	decommissioned 13 February 1969, scrapped 1975
Ranger	United States Navy	Ranger	fleet carrier	14,500	4 June 1934	decommissioned 18 October 1946, scrapped 1947
Ranee	Royal Navy	Ruler	escort carrier	7,800	2 June 1943	paid off 22 January 1947, scrapped 1973
Rapana	Royal Navy	Rapana	merchant aircraft carrier	16,000	1 July 1943	transferred to merchant service post-war; renamed Rotula
Ravager	Royal Navy	Attacker	escort carrier	7,800	25 April 1943	paid off February 1946, scrapped 1973
Reaper	Royal Navy	Ruler	escort carrier	7,800	21 February 1944	paid off 2 July 1946, scrapped 1967
Regele Carol I	Royal Romanian Navy		seaplane carrier	2,653	July 1898	sunk 10 October 1941
Roi	United States Navy	Casablanca	escort carrier	8,188	6 July 1944	decommissioned 9 May 1946, scrapped 1947
Rudyerd Bay	United States Navy	Casablanca	escort carrier	8,188	25 February 1944	decommissioned 11 June 1946, scrapped 1960
Ruler	Royal Navy	Ruler	escort carrier	7,800	22 December 1943	paid off 29 January 1946, scrapped 31 May 1946
Ryūhō	Imperial Japanese Navy	ex-Taigei	light aircraft carrier	13,360	31 March 1934	struck 30 November 1945, scrapped 1946
Ryūjō	Imperial Japanese Navy	Ryūjō	light aircraft carrier	10,600	9 May 1933	sunk 24 August 1942
Sable	United States Navy	ex-SS Greater Buffalo	training aircraft carrier	6,690	8 May 1943	scrapped 1948
Saginaw Bay	United States Navy	Casablanca	escort carrier	8,188	2 March 1944	decommissioned 19 June 1946, scrapped 1960
St. Lo	United States Navy	Casablanca	escort carrier	8,188	23 October 1943	sunk 25 October 1944
Salamaua	United States Navy	Casablanca	escort carrier	8,188	26 May 1944	decommissioned 9 May 1946, scrapped 1947
Salerno Bay	United States Navy	Commencement Bay	escort carrier	10,900	19 May 1945	decommissioned 16 February 1954, scrapped 30 October 1961
Sangamon	United States Navy	Sangamon	escort carrier	11,400	25 August 1942	decommissioned 24 October 1945, scrapped 1960
Santee	United States Navy	Sangamon	escort carrier	11,400	24 August 1942	decommissioned 21 October 1946, scrapped 1960
San Jacinto	United States Navy	Independence	light aircraft carrier	11,000	15 November 1943	decommissioned 1 March 1947, scrapped 1972
Saratoga	United States Navy	Lexington	fleet carrier	33,000	16 November 1927	sunk as a target 1946
Sargent Bay	United States Navy	Casablanca	escort carrier	8,188	9 March 1944	decommissioned 23 June 1946, scrapped 1959
Savo Island	United States Navy	Casablanca	escort carrier	8,188	3 February 1944	decommissioned 12 December 1946, scrapped 1960
Shamrock Bay	United States Navy	Casablanca	escort carrier	8,188	15 March 1944	decommissioned 6 July 1946, scrapped 1958
Shangri-La	United States Navy	Essex	fleet carrier	30,800	15 September 1944	decommissioned 30 July 1971, scrapped 1988
Shimane Maru	Imperial Japanese Navy	Special 1TL Type	escort carrier	11,800	28 February 1945	sunk 24 July 1945, scrapped 1948
Shinano	Imperial Japanese Navy	Yamato	fleet carrier	64,800	19 November 1944	sunk 29 November 1944
Shin'yō	Imperial Japanese Navy	ex-SS Scharnhorst	escort carrier	17,500	15 November 1943	sunk 17 November 1944
Siboney	United States Navy	Commencement Bay	escort carrier	10,900	14 May 1945	decommissioned 31 July 1956, scrapped 1971
Shipley Bay	United States Navy	Casablanca	escort carrier	8,188	21 March 1944	decommissioned 28 June 1946, scrapped 1960
Shōhō	Imperial Japanese Navy	Zuihō	light aircraft carrier	11,260	30 November 1941	sunk 8 May 1942
Shōkaku	Imperial Japanese Navy	Shōkaku	fleet carrier	25,675	8 August 1941	sunk 19 June 1944
Sōryū	Imperial Japanese Navy	Sōryū	fleet carrier	15,900	29 January 1937	sunk 4 June 1942
Searcher	Royal Navy	Attacker	escort carrier	7,800	3 April 1943	paid off 1945, scrapped 21 April 1976
Shah	Royal Navy	Ruler	escort carrier	7,800	27 September 1943	paid off 7 February 1946
Sitkoh Bay	United States Navy	Casablanca	escort carrier	8,188	28 March 1944	decommissioned 27 July 1954, scrapped 1960
Slinger	Royal Navy	Ruler	escort carrier	7,800	11 August 1943	paid off 12 April 1946, scrapped 1969/70
Smiter	Royal Navy	Ruler	escort carrier	7,800	20 January 1944	paid off 6 May 1946, scrapped 1967
Solomons	United States Navy	Casablanca	escort carrier	8,188	21 November 1943	decommissioned 15 May 1946, scrapped 1947
Sparviero	Regia Marina	ex-MS Augustus	escort carrier	30,418		not completed, scrapped 1951
Speaker	Royal Navy	Ruler	escort carrier	7,800	20 November 1943	paid off 25 September 1946, scrapped 1972
Springbank	Royal Navy	Pegasus	fighter catapult ship			sunk 27 September 1941
Stalker	Royal Navy	Attacker	escort carrier	7,800	21 December 1942	paid off 29 December 1945, sold into merchant service as Riouw
Steamer Bay	United States Navy	Casablanca	escort carrier	8,188	4 April 1944	decommissioned January 1947, scrapped 1959
Striker	Royal Navy	Attacker	escort carrier	7,800	29 April 1943	paid off 12 February 1946, scrapped 1948
Suwannee	United States Navy	Sangamon	escort carrier	11,400	24 September 1942	decommissioned 8 January 1947, scrapped 1962
Taihō	Imperial Japanese Navy	Taihō	fleet carrier	29,300	7 March 1944	sunk 19 June 1944
Taiyō	Imperial Japanese Navy	Taiyō	escort carrier	18,116	2 September 1941	sunk 18 August 1944
Takanis Bay	United States Navy	Casablanca	escort carrier	8,188	15 April 1944	decommissioned 18 June 1946, scrapped 29 June 1960
Thane	Royal Navy	Ruler	escort carrier	7,800	19 November 1943	paid off October 1945, scrapped 1946
Thetis Bay	United States Navy	Casablanca	escort carrier	8,188	12 April 1944	decommissioned 1 March 1964, scrapped December 1964
Ticonderoga	United States Navy	Essex	fleet carrier	30,800	8 May 1944	decommissioned 1 September 1973, scrapped 1975
Tracker	Royal Navy	Attacker	escort carrier	7,800	31 January 1943	paid off 2 November 1946, scrapped 1964
Tripoli	United States Navy	Casablanca	escort carrier	8,188	31 October 1943	decommissioned 25 November 1958, scrapped 1960
Trouncer	Royal Navy	Ruler	escort carrier	7,800	31 January 1944	paid off 12 April 1946, scrapped 1973
Trumpeter	Royal Navy	Ruler	escort carrier	7,800	4 August 1943	paid off 19 June 1946, scrapped 1971
Tulagi	United States Navy	Casablanca	escort carrier	8,188	21 December 1943	decommissioned 30 April 1946
Unyō	Imperial Japanese Navy	Taiyō	escort carrier	17,830	31 August 1942	sunk 15 September 1944
Unicorn	Royal Navy		maintenance aircraft carrier	16,510	12 March 1943	paid off 17 November 1953
Unryū	Imperial Japanese Navy	Unryū	fleet carrier	17,150	6 August 1944	sunk 19 December 1944
Vella Gulf	United States Navy	Commencement Bay	escort carrier	10,900	9 April 1945	decommissioned 9 August 1946, scrapped 1971
Venerable	Royal Navy	Colossus	light aircraft carrier	13,200	17 January 1945	paid off April 1947
Vengeance	Royal Navy	Colossus	light aircraft carrier	13,200	15 January 1945	paid off 1952
Victorious	Royal Navy	Illustrious	fleet carrier	23,000	29 May 1941	scrapped 1969
Vindex	Royal Navy	Nairana	escort carrier	13,671	3 December 1943	paid off 1947, scrapped August 1971
Wake Island	United States Navy	Casablanca	escort carrier	8,188	7 November 1943	decommissioned 5 April 1946, scrapped April 1946
Warrior	Royal Navy	Colossus	light aircraft carrier	18,300	2 April 1945	paid off 1970, scrapped 1971
Wasp (CV-7)	United States Navy	Wasp	fleet carrier	14,700	25 April 1940	sunk 15 September 1942
Wasp (CV-18)	United States Navy	Essex	fleet carrier	30,800	24 November 1943	decommissioned 1 July 1972
Weser	Kriegsmarine	Admiral Hipper	escort carrier	17,140		work halted June 1943; scuttled 29 January 1945
White Plains	United States Navy	Casablanca	escort carrier	8,188	15 November 1943	decommissioned 10 July 1946, scrapped 29 July 1958
Windham Bay	United States Navy	Casablanca	escort carrier	8,188	3 May 1944	decommissioned January 1959, scrapped February 1961
Wolverine	United States Navy	ex-SS Seeandbee	training aircraft carrier	7,300	12 August 1942	scrapped 1947
Yamashio Maru	Imperial Japanese Army	Special 2TL Type	escort carrier	15,864	27 January 1945	sunk 17 February 1945
Yorktown (CV-5)	United States Navy	Yorktown	fleet carrier	25,100	30 September 1937	sunk 7 June 1942
Yorktown (CV-10)	United States Navy	Essex	fleet carrier	36,380	15 April 1943	decommissioned 27 June 1970; museum ship
Zuihō	Imperial Japanese Navy	Zuihō	light aircraft carrier	11,260	27 December 1940	sunk 25 October 1944
Zuikaku	Imperial Japanese Navy	Shōkaku	fleet carrier	29,800	25 September 1941	sunk 25 October 1944
Zuiun Maru	Imperial Japanese Army	Special 2TL Type	escort carrier	15,864		not completed during war, converted to tanker 1945, scrapped 15 June 1964

== See also ==
- Submarine aircraft carrier
- Aircraft cruiser
- Battlecarrier

== Bibliography ==
- Colledge, J. J.; Warlow, Ben (2006) [1969]. Ships of the Royal Navy: The Complete Record of All Fighting Ships of the Royal Navy from the 15th Century to the Present (3rd Rev ed.). London: Chatham Publishing. ISBN 978-1-86176-281-8. OCLC 67375475.
- "NavSource Naval History".
- Ader, Clement (2003). Military Aviation, 1909. Edited and translated by Lee Kennett. Maxwell Air Force Base, Alabama: Air University Press. ISBN 978-1-58566-118-3.
- Francillon, René J. (1988). Tonkin Gulf Yacht Club: US Carrier Operations off Vietnam. Annapolis, Maryland: Naval Institute Press. ISBN 978-0-87021-696-1.
- Friedman, Norman (1983). U.S. Aircraft Carriers: An Illustrated Design History. Annapolis, Maryland: Naval Institute Press. ISBN 978-0-87021-739-5.
- Hone, Thomas C.; Friedman, Norman & Mandeles, Mark D. (2011). "Innovation in Carrier Aviation". Naval War College Newport Papers (37): 1–171.
- Melhorn, Charles M. (1974). Two-Block Fox: The Rise of the Aircraft Carrier, 1911–1929. Annapolis, Maryland: Naval Institute Press.
- Nordeen, Lon O. (1985). Air Warfare in the Missile Age. Washington, D.C.: Smithsonian Institution Press. ISBN 978-1-58834-083-2.
- Polak, Christian (2005). Sabre et Pinceau: Par d'autres Français au Japon (1872–1960) (in French and Japanese). Hiroshi Ueki (植木 浩), Philippe Pons, foreword; 筆と刀・日本の中のもうひとつのフランス (1872–1960). éd. L'Harmattan.
- Sturtivant, Ray (1990). British Naval Aviation, The Fleet Air Arm, 1917–1990. London, UK: Arms & Armour Press. ISBN 0-85368-938-5.
- Till, Geoffrey (1996). "Adopting the Aircraft Carrier: The British, Japanese, and American Case Studies". In Murray, Williamson; Millet, Allan R. (eds.). Military Innovation in the Interwar Period. Cambridge, UK: Cambridge University Press. ISBN 978-0-5215-5241-7.
- Trimble, William F. (1994). Admiral William A. Moffett: Architect of Naval Aviation. Washington, D.C.: Smithsonian Institution Press. ISBN 978-1-5609-8320-0.
- Wadle, Ryan David (2005). United States Navy fleet problems and the development of carrier aviation, 1929–1933 (PDF) (PhD). Texas A&M University. Archived from the original (PDF) on 26 May 2015.
- Wise, James E. Jr. (1974). "Catapult Off – Parachute Back". Proceedings. Annapolis, Maryland: United States Naval Institute.
