= Escort carrier =

Type of WWII aircraft carrier

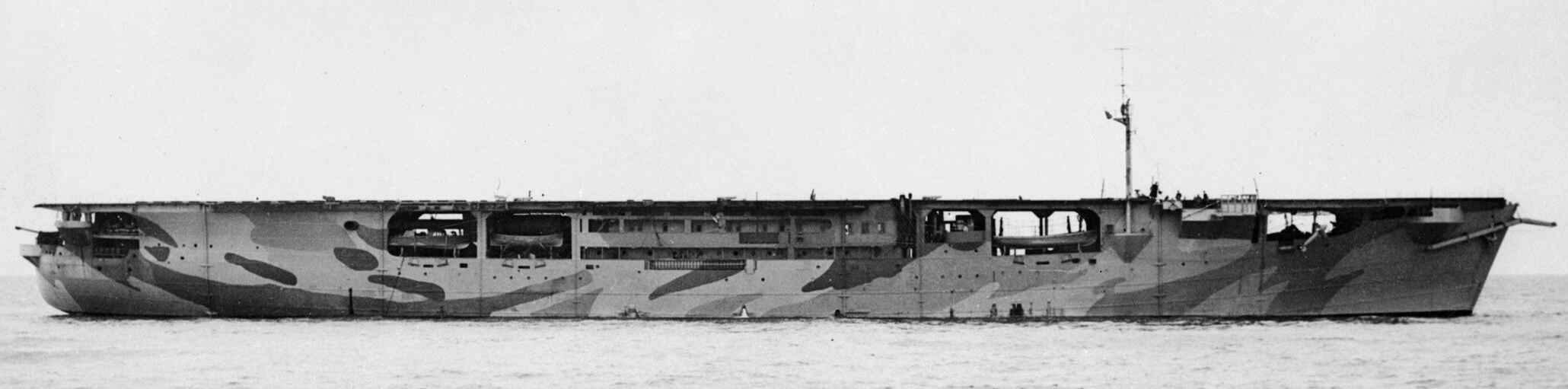
Escort carrier HMS Audacity

The escort carrier or escort aircraft carrier (U.S. hull classification CVE), also called a "jeep carrier" or "baby flattop" in the United States Navy (USN) or "Woolworth Carrier" by the Royal Navy, was a small and slow type of aircraft carrier used by the Royal Navy, the Royal Canadian Navy, the United States Navy, the Imperial Japanese Navy, and Imperial Japanese Army Air Force in World War II. They were typically 20 to 40 percent shorter, and displaced 30 to 60 percent less, than fleet carriers; and with hulls built to commercial standards--far less sophisticated structurally, and incorporating far fewer protective elements than any front-line combat ship--they could be built more quickly and cheaply than vessels meant to engage in combat. Obviously, the lack of protection made escort carriers particularly vulnerable, and several were sunk with great loss of life. Of the 151 aircraft carriers built in the U.S. during World War II, 122 were escort carriers, though no examples survive. The Casablanca class was the most numerous class of aircraft carrier, with 50 launched. Second was the Bogue class, with 45 launched.

Escort carriers were not designed to be able to keep up with front-line combat vessels; rather, they were given only enough speed to enable them to accompany cargo ships, troop transports, and landing craft traveling in convoys. During the Battle of the Atlantic British escort carriers generally provided close-in support to individual convoys, helping to fend off attacks from aircraft, submarines, and occasionally surface raiders. Later, as CVEs became more widely available, the U.S. Navy (which handled a much smaller share of commerce-protection duties in the Atlantic than did the British or Canadians) introduced carrier-centered hunter-killer groups, each consisting of an escort carrier and three or four old destroyers or destroyer-escorts, which were tasked with hunting down (with the help of high-grade intelligence and direction-finding equipment) and destroying priority targets, including "milch cow" submarines, which could replenish numerous other subs and keep them on patrol for prolonged periods, instead of closely accompanying any particular convoy.

In the Mediterranean and Pacific theaters CVEs provided air support for ground troops during amphibious operations, relying on fleet units for protection against enemy attack. This did not always work: during the Battle of Leyte Gulf, through miscommunication, a group of American escort carriers covering landings on Leyte was surprised by a powerful Japanese force of battleships and heavy cruisers that was descending on the beachhead. Despite the disparity in strength, at the Battle off Samar one U.S. task group consisting of six CVEs, three destroyers, and three destroyer-escorts, with distant support from two similar task groups, managed to successfully turn back the Japanese force, albeit at a very high cost.

A significant percentage of escort carriers were tasked primarily with transporting aircraft from home ports to remote bases for redistribution. Later, from late 1944 onward, CVEs took on the even more demanding task of taking replacement aircraft from forward depots directly to fleet carriers, enabling those ships to maintain their air groups at full strength without their having to return to port.

== Development ==
The Washington Naval Treaty of 1922 imposed limits on the total tonnage of aircraft carriers that could be operated by the five main naval powers--Great Britain, the United States, Japan, Italy, and France. These limits, put in place when the sole functions anticipated for carriers were related to direct support of battle fleets, prevented navies from acquiring enough flight decks to fill the myriad roles that would emerge for them by the time war broke out in 1939: the transport of aircraft to remote bases, the delivery of air support for amphibious operations, the training of pilots in operating from flight decks, and the development of tactics for using aircraft in support of convoy-escort efforts. When war broke out these long back-burnered functions quickly took on a new priority, and available carriers had to be diverted from their fleet duties to fill the void.

The British Royal Navy had recognized a need for carriers to defend its trade routes in the 1930s. While designs had been prepared for "trade protection carriers" and five suitable liners were identified for conversion, nothing further was done, in part because, when war broke out, there were not enough carrier aircraft in the offing to equip even the fleet carriers that were under construction at the time, and because the chosen ships were also well suited to perform other functions. From early 1940, as a stop-gap solution, suitable merchant vessels (designated, for this purpose, as fighter catapult ships and Catapult-Armed Merchantmen [CAM ships]s) were equipped with rocket-powered catapults that allowed them to launch, once, worn-out Hawker Hurricane land-based fighters to defend against prowling German aircraft.

A better solution presented itself in late 1940 when a German merchant vessel, MV Hannover, was captured. The Royal Navy claimed the vessel and had it converted into Britain's first trade-protection carrier, HMS Audacity, commissioned in July 1941. Although this vessel could operate only six aircraft, all fighters, it quickly proved its worth over a short career, and made clear the value of acquiring additional units. And because comparable British vessels remained unavailable, the Royal Navy turned to the United States for assistance.

In the late 1920s the United States had also begun to consider the possibility of converting both naval and commercial vessels into aircraft carriers. Notions of turning cruisers of the disappointing Omaha class into sub-10,000-ton carriers (tonnage of which would not have counted against Washington Treaty limits) were not pursued because it was felt that such small ships would necessarily lack too many desirable features. Plans for converting large (nearly the size of fleet carriers), "fast" (actually in the 22-knot-and-under range) merchant vessels into supplemental fleet carriers ("XCV"s) proceeded much farther, being considered imminent as late as 1941; however, as with the British, ultimately this plan was not implemented because the vessels involved were equally well suited for other vital transport roles which would involve much less elaborate conversions. Then, in 1940, U.S. Admiral William Halsey recommended construction of auxiliary carriers for pilot training. The only ships that would end up being converted specifically to perform these duties were USS Sable (IX-81) and USS Wolverine (IX-64), two coal-fired sidewheel steamers which were fitted with flight decks and commissioned in 1943, serving on the Great Lakes.

The real start of the American escort carrier program came on 1 February 1941, when the Chief of Naval Operations ordered that priority be given to construction of naval auxiliaries for aircraft transport. This would lead to the conversion of two rail-car transports into USS Kitty Hawk and USS Hammondsport, dedicated aircraft transports without flying-on or -off facilities, and also of the prototype U.S. Navy escort carrier, USS Long Island, a converted Type C3-S-A1 cargo ship, which was commissioned two weeks before Audacity, and used almost entirely in an aircraft-transport role. The conversion was judged successful and a decision was made to produce more such vessels, to serve more general purposes.

With the British also pressing for the United States to supply them with auxiliary carriers, orders that ultimately led to the construction of 50 additional carriers based on improved conversions of C3 hulls were placed in several stages. The resulting ships, 37 of which were delivered to Britain under Lend-Lease, were initially (from February 1941) classified as auxiliary aircraft escort vessels (AVGs); then, from 5 August 1942 forward, as auxiliary aircraft carriers (ACVs); and finally, from 15 July 1943 onward, as escort aircraft carriers (CVEs). The final change, to a designation as a combatant, reflected respect for the type gained during the invasion of North Africa (Operation Torch) and convoy operations in the North and Middle Atlantic.

Among their crews, CVE was sarcastically said to stand for "Combustible, Vulnerable, and Expendable", and the CVEs were called "Kaiser coffins" in honor of Casablanca-class manufacturer Henry J. Kaiser. Magazine protection was minimal in comparison to fleet aircraft carriers. HMS Avenger was sunk within minutes by a single torpedo, and HMS Dasher exploded from undetermined causes with very heavy loss of life. Three escort carriers—USS St. Lo, Ommaney Bay and Bismarck Sea—were destroyed by kamikazes, the largest ships to meet such a fate.

Allied escort carriers were typically around 500 ft (150 m) long, not much more than half the length of the almost 900 ft (270 m) fleet carriers of the same era, but were less than 1/3 of the weight. A typical escort carrier displaced about 8,000 long tons (8,100 t), as compared to almost 30,000 long tons (30,000 t) for a full-size fleet carrier. The aircraft hangar typically ran only 1/3 of the way under the flight deck and housed a combination of 24–30 fighters and bombers organized into one single "composite squadron". By comparison, a late Essex-class fleet carrier of the period could carry 103 aircraft organized into separate fighter, bomber and torpedo-bomber squadrons.

The islands (superstructure) on these ships were small and cramped, and located well forward of the funnels (unlike on a normal-sized carrier, where the funnels were usually integrated into the island). Although the first escort carriers had only one aircraft elevator, having two elevators (one fore and one aft), along with the single aircraft catapult, quickly became standard. The carriers employed the same system of arresting cables and tail hooks as on the big carriers, and procedures for launch and recovery were the same as well.

The crew size was less than 1/3 of that of a large carrier, but this was still a bigger complement than most naval vessels. U.S. escort carriers were large enough to have facilities such as a permanent canteen or snack bar, called a gedunk bar, in addition to the mess. The bar was open for longer hours than the mess and sold several flavors of ice cream, along with cigarettes and other consumables. There were also several vending machines available on board.

In all, 130 Allied escort carriers were launched or converted during the war. Of these, six were British conversions of merchant ships: HMS Audacity, Nairana, Campania, Activity, Pretoria Castle and Vindex. The remaining escort carriers were U.S.-built. Like the British, the first U.S. escort carriers were converted merchant vessels (or in the Sangamon class, converted military oilers). The Bogue-class carriers were based on the hull of the Type C3 cargo ship. The last 69 escort carriers of the Casablanca and Commencement Bay classes were purpose-designed and purpose-built carriers drawing on the experience gained with the previous classes.

== Royal Navy ==
Originally developed at the behest of the United Kingdom to operate as part of a North Atlantic convoy escort, rather than as part of a naval strike force, many of the escort carriers produced were assigned to the Royal Navy for the duration of the war under the Lend-Lease act. They supplemented and then replaced the converted merchant aircraft carriers that were put into service by the British and Dutch as an emergency measure until dedicated escort carriers became available. As convoy escorts, they were used by the Royal Navy to provide air scouting, to ward off enemy long-range scouting aircraft and, increasingly, to spot and hunt submarines. Often additional escort carriers joined convoys, not as fighting ships but as transporters, ferrying aircraft from the U.S. to Britain; twice as many aircraft could be carried by storing aircraft on the flight deck as well as in the hangar.

The ships sent to the Royal Navy were slightly modified, partly to suit the traditions of that service. Among other things the ice-cream making machines were removed, since they were considered unnecessary luxuries on ships which provided a grog ration. The heavy duty washing machines of the laundry room were removed, since "all a British sailor needs to keep clean is a bucket and a bar of soap" (quoted from Warrilow).

Other modifications were due to the need for a completely enclosed hangar when operating in the North Atlantic and in support of the Arctic convoys.

== Royal Canadian Navy ==
Royal Canadian Navy (RCN) crews operated two US-built escort carriers that served with the Royal Navy: HMS Nabob and HMS Puncher.

After launching at Tacoma, they underwent final fitting at Vancouver – with standard equipment shared by the RCN, RN and other Commonwealth navies. Complemented by UK Fleet Air Arm aircrews and aircraft, Nabob and Puncher served in the North Atlantic as part of the British fleet.

== U.S. Navy service ==
The attack on Pearl Harbor brought up an urgent need for aircraft carriers, so some T3 tankers were converted to escort carriers; USS Suwannee is an example of how a T3 tanker hull, AO-33, was rebuilt to be an escort carrier. The T3 tanker size and speed made the T3 a useful escort carrier. There were two classes of T3 hull carriers: Sangamon class and Commencement Bay class.

The U.S. discovered their own uses for escort carriers. In the North Atlantic, they supplemented the escorting destroyers by providing air support for anti-submarine warfare. One of these escort carriers, USS Guadalcanal, was instrumental in the capture of U-505 off North Africa in 1944.

In the Pacific theater, escort carriers lacked the speed to sail with fast carrier attack groups, so were often tasked to escort the landing ships and troop carriers during the island-hopping campaign. In this role they provided air cover for the troopships and flew the first wave of attacks on beach fortifications in amphibious landing operations. On occasion, they even escorted the large carriers, serving as emergency airstrips and providing fighter cover for their larger sisters while these were busy readying or refueling their own planes. They also transported aircraft and spare parts from the U.S. to remote island airstrips.

=== Battle off Samar ===
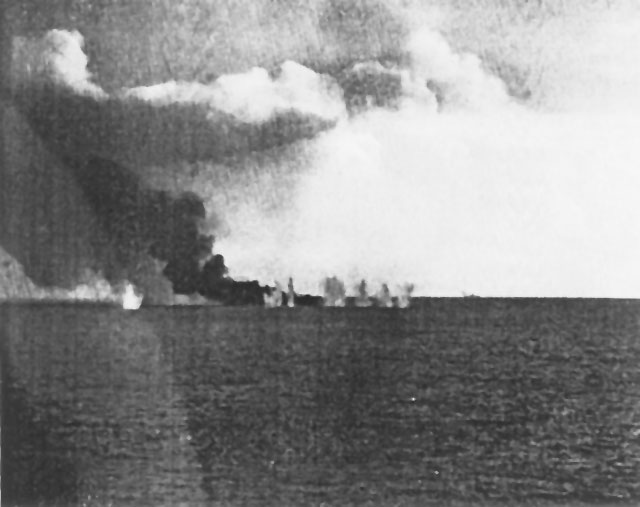
USS Gambier Bay, burning from earlier gunfire damage, is bracketed by a salvo from a Japanese heavy cruiser (faintly visible in the background, center-right) shortly before sinking during the Battle off Samar.

A battle in which escort carriers played a major role was the Battle off Samar in the Philippines on 25 October 1944. The Japanese lured Admiral William Halsey, Jr. into chasing a decoy fleet with his powerful 3rd Fleet. This left about 450 aircraft from 16 small and slow escort carriers in three task units ("Taffies"), armed primarily to bomb ground forces, and their protective screen of destroyers and slower destroyer escorts to protect undefended troop and supply ships in Leyte Gulf. No Japanese threat was believed to be in the area, but a force of four battleships, including the formidable Yamato, eight cruisers, and 11 destroyers, appeared, sailing towards Leyte Gulf. Only the Taffies were in the way of the Japanese attack.

The slow carriers could not outrun 30-knot (35 mph; 56 km/h) cruisers. They launched their aircraft and maneuvered to avoid shellfire, helped by smoke screens, for over an hour. "Taffy 3" bore the brunt of the fight. The Taffy ships took dozens of hits, mostly from armor-piercing rounds that passed right through their thin, unarmored hulls without exploding. USS Gambier Bay, sunk in this action, was the only U.S. carrier lost to enemy surface gunfire in the war; the Japanese concentration of fire on this one carrier assisted the escape of the others. The carriers' only substantial armament—aside from their aircraft—was a single 5-inch (127 mm) dual-purpose gun mounted on the stern, but the pursuing Japanese cruisers closed to within range of these guns. One of the guns damaged the burning Japanese heavy cruiser Chōkai, and a subsequent bomb dropped by an aircraft hit the cruiser's forward machinery room, leaving her dead in the water. A kamikaze attack sank USS St Lo; kamikaze aircraft attacking other ships were shot down. Ultimately the superior Japanese surface force withdrew, believing they were confronted by a stronger force than was the case. Most of the damage to the Japanese fleet was inflicted by torpedoes fired by destroyers, and bombs from the carriers' aircraft.

The U.S. Navy lost a similar number of ships and more men than in the battles of the Coral Sea and Midway combined (though major fleet carriers were lost in the other battles).

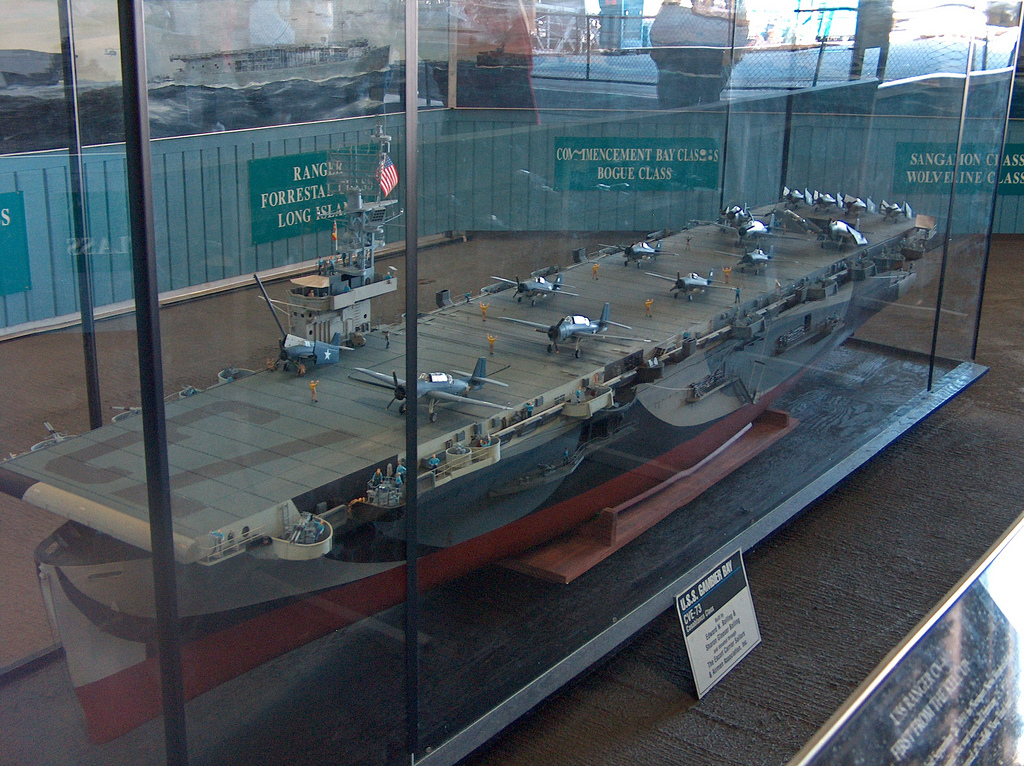
Model of the Casablanca-class Gambier Bay at USS Midway museum

== The ships ==
Many escort carriers were Lend-Leased to the United Kingdom, this list specifies the breakdown in service to each navy.

- Long Island class: Two ships, one in USN service (USS Long Island) and one in British service (HMS Archer).
- Avenger class: Four ships, one mainly in USN service (as USS Charger) and three in British service.
- Sangamon class: Four ships, all in USN service.
- Bogue class: 45 ships, 11 in USN service, 34 in British service as Attacker class (first group) and Ruler class (second group, of which 2 were crewed by Royal Canadian Navy personnel).
- Casablanca class: 50 ships, all in USN service.
- Commencement Bay class: 19 ships, all in USN service, including two that were accepted but not commissioned and laid up for many years after the war. Four more units were canceled and scrapped on the building slips. The Commencement Bay-class ships were seen as the finest escort carriers ever built, and several units continued in service after the war as training carriers, aircraft ferries and other auxiliary uses.

In addition, six escort carriers were converted from other types by the British during the war.

The table below lists escort carriers and similar ships performing the same missions. The first four were built as early fleet aircraft carriers. Merchant aircraft carriers (MAC) carried trade cargo in addition to operating aircraft. Aircraft transports carried larger numbers of planes by eliminating accommodation for operating personnel and storage of fuel and ammunition.

Name	Date	Nation	Displacement	Speed	Aircraft	Notes
HMS Argus	1918	UK	14,000 tons (net)	20 kn (37 km/h; 23 mph)	18	converted liner
USS Langley	1922	United States	11,500 tons	15 kn (28 km/h; 17 mph)	30	converted collier
Hōshō	1923	Japan	7,500 tons (standard)	25 kn (46 km/h; 29 mph)	12	early fleet carrier
HMS Hermes	1924	UK	10,850 tons (standard)	25 kn (46 km/h; 29 mph)	12	early fleet carrier
HMS Audacity	1941	UK	11,000 tons	15 kn (28 km/h; 17 mph)	6	merchant conversion
USS Long Island, HMS Archer	1941	United States and UK	9,000 tons	17 kn (31 km/h; 20 mph)	15–21	merchant conversions
HMS Avenger, Biter, Dasher, USS Charger	1941	United States and UK	8,200 tons	17 kn (31 km/h; 20 mph)	15–21	merchant conversions
Taiyō class (Taiyō, Unyō, Chūyō)	1941	Japan	17,830 tons (standard)	21 kn (39 km/h; 24 mph)	27	converted liners
HMS Activity	1942	UK	11,800 tons (standard)	18 kn (33 km/h; 21 mph)	10–15	merchant conversion
Bogue class	1942	United States, Canada, and UK	9,800 tons	18 kn (33 km/h; 21 mph)	15–21	45 conversions of C-3 merchant hulls
USS Sangamon, Suwanee, Chenango, Santee	1942	United States	11,400 tons (standard)	18 kn (33 km/h; 21 mph)	31	converted oilers
Akitsu Maru	1942	Japan (Army)	11,800 tons (standard)	20 kn (37 km/h; 23 mph)	8	liners converted to Type-C landing craft carriers
Campania	1943	UK	12,400 tons (standard)	18 kn (33 km/h; 21 mph)	18	merchant conversion
Vindex	1943	UK	13,400 tons (standard)	16 kn (30 km/h; 18 mph)	15–20	merchant conversion
Nairana	1943	UK	14,000 tons (standard)	16 kn (30 km/h; 18 mph)	15–20	merchant conversion
Rapana class (Acavus, Adula, Alexia, Amastra, Ancylus, Gadila, Macoma, Miralda, Rapana)	1943	UK	12,000 tons	12 kn (22 km/h; 14 mph)	3	tankers converted to merchant aircraft carriers
Casablanca class	1943	United States	7,800 tons	19 kn (35 km/h; 22 mph)	28	50 built as escort aircraft carriers
Kaiyō	1943	Japan	13,600 tons (standard)	23 kn (43 km/h; 26 mph)	24	converted liner
HMS Pretoria Castle	1943	UK	17,400 tons (standard)	18 kn (33 km/h; 21 mph)	21	merchant conversion
Empire MacAlpine, Empire MacAndrew, Empire MacRae, Empire MacKendrick, Empire MacCallum, Empire MacDermott	1943	UK	8,000 tons (gross)	12 kn (22 km/h; 14 mph)	4	grain carrying merchant aircraft carriers
Empire MacCabe, Empire MacKay, Empire MacMahon, Empire MacColl	1943	UK	9,000 tons (gross)	11 kn (20 km/h; 13 mph)	3	tanker merchant aircraft carriers
Commencement Bay class	1944	United States	10,900 tons	19 kn (35 km/h; 22 mph)	34	19 built as escort aircraft carriers
Shin'yō	1944	Japan	17,500 tons	22 kn (41 km/h; 25 mph)	33	converted liner
Shimane Maru class	1945	Japan	11,989 tons (standard)	18.5 kn (34.3 km/h; 21.3 mph)	12	converted tanker
Yamashio Maru class	1945	Japan (Army)	16,119 tons (standard)	15 kn (28 km/h; 17 mph)	8	converted tanker
Kumano Maru	1945	Japan (Army)	8,258 tons (standard)	19 kn (35 km/h; 22 mph)	8–37	Type M cargo ship converted to Type-MC landing craft carrier

== Relative carrier sizes in World War II ==
	Bogue-class escort carrier	Independence-class light carrier	Essex-class fleet carrier	Illustrious-class fleet carrier
Length:	495 ft (151 m)	625 ft (191 m)	875 ft (267 m)	740 ft (226 m)
Beam:	69 ft (21 m)	72 ft (22 m)	92 ft (28 m)	95 ft (29 m)
Displacement:	9,800 t	11,000 t	27,100 t	23,000 t
Armament	1× 5-inch/38-caliber gun, light AA	light AA	12× 5-inch/38-caliber guns, light AA	16× QF 4.5-inch Mk I – V naval guns
Armor	None	50–125 mm	150–200 mm	75 mm deck
Aircraft:	24	33	90	57
Speed:	18 kn (33 km/h; 21 mph)	32 kn (58 km/h; 36 mph)	33 kn (61 km/h; 38 mph)	31 kn (56 km/h; 35 mph)
Crew:	850	1,569	3,448	817 + 390

== Post-World War II ==
The years following World War II brought many revolutionary new technologies to naval aviation, most notably the helicopter and the jet fighter, and with this a complete rethinking of its strategies and ships' tasks. Although several of the latest Commencement Bay-class CVE were deployed as floating airfields during the Korean War, the main reasons for the development of the escort carrier had disappeared or could be dealt with better by newer weapons. The emergence of the helicopter meant that helicopter-deck equipped frigates could now take over the CVE's role in a convoy while also performing their usual role as submarine hunters. Ship-mounted guided missile launchers took over much of the aircraft protection role, and in-flight refueling eliminated the need for floating stopover points for transport or patrol aircraft. Consequently, after the Commencement Bay class, no new escort carriers were designed, and with every downsizing of the navy, the CVEs were the first to be mothballed.

Several escort carriers were pressed back into service during the first years of the Vietnam War because of their ability to carry large numbers of aircraft. Redesignated AKV (air transport auxiliary), they were manned by a civilian crew and used to ferry whole aircraft and spare parts from the U.S. to Army, Air Force and Marine bases in South Vietnam. However, CVEs were useful in this role only for a limited period. Once all major aircraft were equipped with refueling probes, it became much easier to fly the aircraft directly to its base instead of shipping it.

The last chapter in the history of escort carriers consisted of two conversions: as an experiment, USS Thetis Bay was converted from an aircraft carrier into a pure helicopter carrier (CVHA-1) and used by the Marine Corps to carry assault helicopters for the first wave of amphibious warfare operations. Later, Thetis Bay became a full amphibious assault ship (LHP-6). Although in service only from 1955 (the year of her conversion) to 1964, the experience gained in her training exercises greatly influenced the design of today's amphibious assault ships.

In the second conversion, in 1961, USS Gilbert Islands had all her aircraft handling equipment removed and four tall radio antennas installed on her long, flat deck. In lieu of aircraft, the hangar deck now had 24 military radio transmitter trucks bolted to its floor. Rechristened USS Annapolis, the ship was used as a communication relay ship and served dutifully through the Vietnam War as a floating radio station, relaying transmissions between the forces on the ground and the command centers back home. Like Thetis Bay, the experience gained before Annapolis was stricken in 1976 helped develop today's purpose-built amphibious command ships of the Blue Ridge class.

Unlike almost all other major classes of ships and patrol boats from World War II, most of which can be found in a museum or port, no escort carrier or American light carrier has survived; all were destroyed during the war or broken up in the following decades. The Dictionary of American Naval Fighting Ships records that the last former escort carrier remaining in naval service—USS Annapolis—was sold for scrapping 19 December 1979. The last American light carrier (the escort carrier's faster sister type) was USS Cabot, which was broken up in 2002 after a decade-long attempt to preserve the vessel.

Later in the Cold War the U.S.-designed Sea Control Ship was intended to serve a similar role; while none were actually built, the Spanish aircraft carrier Principe de Asturias and the Thai HTMS Chakri Naruebet are based on the concept.

== See also ==
For complete lists see:

- List of escort carriers by country
- List of escort carriers of the United States Navy
- List of sunken aircraft carriers
- List of escort carriers of the Royal Navy
- List of ships of the Imperial Japanese Navy
- List of aircraft carriers of World War II
