= List of escort carriers by country =

The list of escort carriers by country includes all escort aircraft carriers organized by country of origin and service. Where appropriate, a single ship may be listed under multiple countries. For the list of fleet and light carriers see List of aircraft carriers by country.

== Carriers operated ==
Nation	Planned	Built	Cancelled	Operated	Lost
Japan	18	9	9	9	8
UK & Canada		45		45	5
US		124	4	84	6

== Japan ==
=== Imperial Japanese Navy ===
- Taiyō class
  - Taiyō (1941) – sunk by U.S. submarine USS Rasher, August 1944
  - Un'yō (1942) – sunk by U.S. submarine USS Barb, September 1944
  - Chūyō (1942) – sunk by U.S. submarine USS Sailfish, December 1943
- Kaiyō (1943) – damaged at Kure by U.S. air raid March 1945, grounded in Beppu Bay and dismantled in place in 1946
- Shin'yō (1944) – sunk by U.S. submarine USS Spadefish, November 1944
- Special 1TL Type
  - Shimane Maru (1945) – sunk by British aircraft, July 1945
  - Ōtakisan Maru – launched in January 1945 but 70 % completed; drifted onto a mine in August 1945 and sank; scrapped in 1948
  - Daiju Maru – launched in January 1945 but never completed; completed as cargo and sold in October 1949, renamed Ryūhō Maru; scrapped in May 1964
  - Taisha Maru – cancelled in 1944

=== Imperial Japanese Army ===
- Special 2TL Type
  - Yamashio Maru (1945) – sunk by US aircraft, February 1945
  - Chigusa Maru – never completed; sunk in 1945; repaired as tanker in 1945; scrapped in June 1963
  - Zuiun Maru – never completed; scrapped in June 1964.
- Special 3TL Type – Type 3TL tankers conversion project; 3 ships; canceled
- Special 4TL Type – Type 4TL tankers conversion project; canceled

Landing craft carriers with flight deck:

- Akitsu Maru
- Kumano Maru

== United Kingdom ==
- Audacity (D10)
- Long Island class
  - Archer (D78)
- Avenger class
  - Avenger (D14)
  - Biter (D97)
  - Charger – transfer to Royal Navy in 1941 reversed immediately
  - Dasher
- Bogue class
  - RN Attacker class
    - Battler
    - Attacker
    - Hunter
    - Chaser
    - Fencer
    - Stalker
    - Pursuer
    - Striker
    - Searcher
    - Ravager
    - Tracker
  - RN Ameer or Ruler class
    - Slinger
    - Atheling
    - Emperor
    - Ameer
    - Begum
    - Trumpeter
    - Empress
    - Khedive
    - Speaker
    - Nabob, commissioned into the Royal Canadian Navy under Royal Navy control
    - Premier
    - Shah
    - Patroller
    - Rajah
    - Ranee
    - Trouncer
    - Thane
    - Queen
    - Ruler
    - Arbiter
    - Smiter
    - Puncher, commissioned into the Royal Canadian Navy under Royal Navy control
    - Reaper
- Activity (D94)
- Nairana class
  - Nairana (D05) (to Royal Netherlands Navy as Karel Doorman)
  - Vindex (D15)
- Pretoria Castle (F61)
- Campania (D48)

== United States ==
Date ranges are commissioning dates, ship counts includes United States Navy and lend-leased Royal Navy vessels (i.e. production totals), count in parentheses is the number of ships in US service. The degree to which hulls were completed before conversion varies from not at all to already launched.

- 2 (1) Long Island class (Jun 1941 – Nov 1941, Type C3 ship conversion)
- 45 (11) Bogue class (Jun 1942 – Jun 1943, Type C3 conversion)
- 4 (4) Sangamon class (Aug 1942 – Sep 1942, T3 tanker conversion)
- 4 (1) Charger class (Mar 1942 – Jul 1942, Type C3 conversion)
- 50 (50) Casablanca class (Jul 1943 – Jul 1944)
- 19 (19) Commencement Bay class (Nov 1944 – Feb 1946)

== See also ==
- List of aircraft carriers of World War II
