= Pegasus class =

Pegasus is the name of several classes of vehicles:

- Pegasus-class hydrofoil, U.S. Navy type of fast attack patrol boat
- Pegasus-class Assault Carrier, a mobile suit carrier in the Gundam fictional multiverse's Universal Century timeline
- five British Royal Navy ships carrying a single fighter launched by catapult, known as fighter catapult ships
