= Aircraft maintenance carriers of the Royal Navy =

The Royal Navy built three aircraft maintenance carriers for its Fleet Air Arm before and during World War II. The Abyssinia Crisis of 1934–35 demonstrated to the Admiralty that it needed a depot ship to support the aircraft carriers in active service, just like submarine and destroyer tenders supported those types. Begun just before the start of World War II in 1939, HMS Unicorn was the first ship built in any navy that could "carry out the full range of aircraft maintenance and repair work in addition to the ability to operate aircraft from the flight deck". Unicorn proved the value of the concept and two similar support ships, Perseus and Pioneer were converted into aircraft maintenance ships by modifying light carriers while still under construction. Unlike Unicorn, neither Pioneer nor Perseus were able to land aircraft; they had to be craned aboard.

Unicorn was used as a light carrier in 1943 before she was sent to the Indian Ocean in 1944 where she was used in her designed role. Pioneer arrived the following year to support the British Pacific Fleet (BPF). Perseus arrived in the Pacific after the end of the war. All three ships were placed in reserve upon their return to the UK in 1946. Unicorn was recommissioned before the start of the Korean War for use as a ferry carrier, but was used in her designed role during the war. Pioneer was recommissioned in 1950 to test new carrier equipment and then became a ferry carrier. Perseus was never recommissioned and all three ships were sold for scrap during the 1950s.

== Key ==
Definitions
Main guns	The number and type of the main battery guns
Armour	Waterline belt thickness
Displacement	Ship displacement
Propulsion	Number of shafts, type of propulsion system, and top speed generated
Service	The dates work began and finished on the ship and its ultimate fate
Laid down	The date the keel began to be assembled
Launched	The date the ship was launched
Commissioned	The date the ship was commissioned

== HMS Unicorn ==
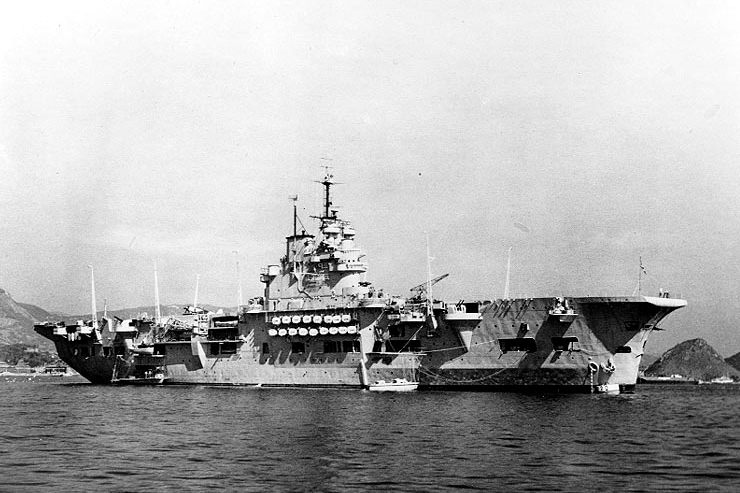
HMS Unicorn at a Japanese port (probably Sasebo)

HMS Unicorn was an aircraft repair ship built for the Royal Navy in the late 1930s. The ship was initially completed as a light aircraft carrier and provided air cover over the amphibious landing at Salerno, Italy, in September 1943. The ship converted back into a maintenance ship afterwards and she was transferred to the Eastern Fleet in the Indian Ocean at the end of the year. Unicorn supported the aircraft carriers of the fleet on their operations until the BPF was formed in November 1944. She was transferred to Australia in early 1945 to support the BPF's operations during Operation Iceberg, the Allied invasion of Okinawa in May. To shorten the time required to replenish the British carriers, the ship was based in the Admiralty Islands and in the Philippine Islands until the Japanese surrender in August. Unicorn was decommissioned and placed in reserve when she returned to the UK in January 1946.

The ship was recommissioned in 1949 to support the carriers of the Far East Fleet, as the Eastern Fleet had been redesignated after World War II. She was unloading aircraft and equipment in Singapore in June 1950 when the Korean War began. She spent most of the war ferrying aircraft, troops, stores and equipment in support of Commonwealth operations in Korea. Unicorn supported other carriers during operations in Korea, but she became the only aircraft carrier to conduct a shore bombardment with her guns during wartime when she attacked North Korean observers on the coast during the war. The ship returned to the UK after the end of the war and was again placed in reserve. She was sold for scrap in 1959.

Specifications, construction and service data
Ship	Aircraft	Armament	Displacement	Propulsion	Service			
Ship	Aircraft	Armament	Displacement	Propulsion	Laid down	Launched	Commissioned	Fate
HMS Unicorn	36	4 × twin QF 4-inch Mk XVI dual-purpose guns 4 × quadruple 2-pounder anti-aircraft guns four × twin, five × single 20 mm Oerlikon anti-aircraft guns	16,510 long tons (16,775 t)	2 screws, 2 steam turbines, 24 kn (44 km/h; 28 mph)	29 June 1939	20 November 1941	12 March 1943	Scrapped beginning 15 June 1959

== Colossus class ==
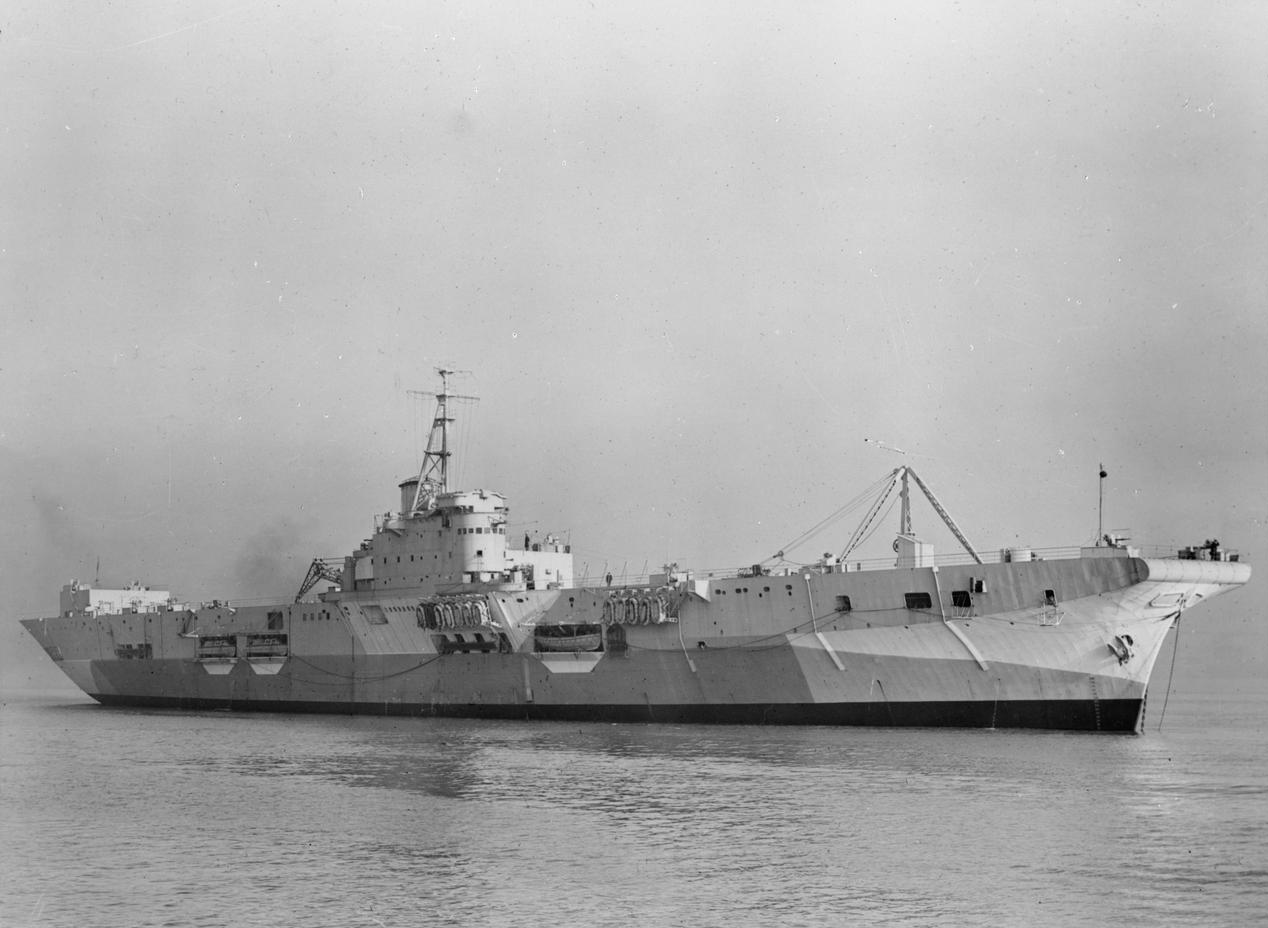
HMS Pioneer, 3 February 1945

Pioneer and Perseus were not completed to their original design as Colossus-class light aircraft carriers; the success of Unicorn prompted modification of the ships whilst under construction into aircraft maintenance ships without aircraft catapults and deckhouses built on the flight deck.

Pioneer arrived in Australia in early 1945 to support operations by the BPF against Japanese forces from a base in the Admiralty Islands. The ship and her facilities were used to help repair Hong Kong's infrastructure in late 1945 and she returned to the UK in early 1946. Pioneer was immediately placed in reserve upon her arrival and she was sold in 1954 for scrap.

Perseus was completed in 1945, after the end of World War II, and she made a trip to Australia late in the year, just in time to help return men, aircraft and equipment. Upon her return to the UK in early 1946, Perseus was placed in reserve. The ship was recommissioned in 1950 to serve as the trials ship for the steam catapult then under development. Over 1600 test launches were conducted before the catapult was removed in 1952 and she was converted for use as a ferry carrier to transport aircraft, troops and equipment overseas. She was reduced to reserve again in 1954 and sold for scrap in 1958.

Specifications, construction and service data
Ship	Aircraft	Armament	Displacement	Propulsion	Service			
Ship	Aircraft	Armament	Displacement	Propulsion	Laid down	Launched	Commissioned	Fate
HMS Pioneer	None	6 × quadruple 2-pounder anti-aircraft guns 19 × single 40 mm Bofors anti-aircraft guns	12,000–12,265 long tons (12,193–12,462 t)	2 screws, 2 steam turbines, 25 kn (46 km/h; 29 mph)	2 December 1942	26 March 1944	8 February 1944	Sold for scrap, September 1954
HMS Perseus	None	6 × quadruple 2-pounder anti-aircraft guns 19 × single 40 mm Bofors anti-aircraft guns	12,000–12,265 long tons (12,193–12,462 t)	2 screws, 2 steam turbines, 25 kn (46 km/h; 29 mph)	1 January 1943	20 May 1944	Completed, 19 October 1945	Sold for scrap, May 1958

== See also ==
- List of aircraft carriers of the Royal Navy
- List of aircraft carriers of World War II
- List of escort carriers of the Royal Navy
- List of seaplane carriers of the Royal Navy
- List of ships of World War II
