= HMS Perseus (R51) =

1945 Colossus-class aircraft maintenance ship of the Royal Navy

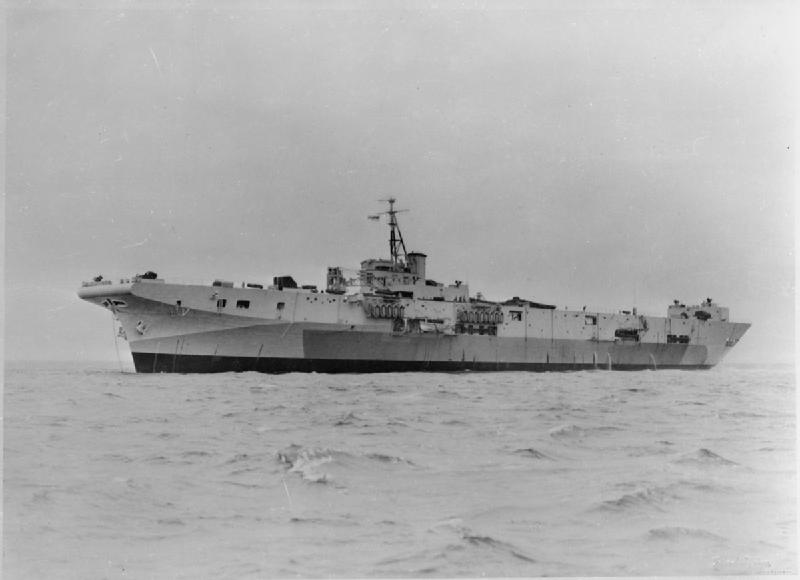
- Perseus at anchor

History

United Kingdom
- Name: Perseus
- Namesake: Perseus
- Ordered: 14 March 1942
- Builder: Vickers-Armstrongss, Newcastle-upon-Tyne
- Laid down: 1 January 1943
- Launched: 26 March 1944
- Completed: 19 October 1945
- Identification: Pennant number: R51
- Fate: Sold for scrap, May 1958

General characteristics
- Class & type: Colossus-class aircraft maintenance ship
- Displacement: 12,265 long tons (12,462 t) (standard); 16,500 long tons (16,800 t) (deep load)
- Length: 695 ft (211.8 m)
- Beam: 80 ft 4 in (24.49 m)
- Draught: 23 ft (7.0 m) (deep load)
- Installed power: 40,000 shp (30,000 kW)
- Propulsion: 2 × shafts; 2 × Parsons geared steam turbine sets; 4 × Admiralty water-tube boilers
- Speed: 25 knots (46 km/h; 29 mph)
- Range: 12,000 nmi (22,000 km; 14,000 mi) at 14 knots (26 km/h; 16 mph)
- Complement: 1,076
- Sensors & processing systems: 6 × Type 262 gunnery radars
- Armament: 6 × 4 - 2-pounder anti-aircraft guns; 19 × 1 - 40 mm Bofors anti-aircraft guns
- Aircraft carried: None

HMS Perseus was a Colossus-class light fleet aircraft carrier built for the Royal Navy during World War II. The ship was initially named HMS Edgar, but she was renamed in 1944 when the Admiralty decided to convert her into an aircraft maintenance carrier. She was completed in 1945, after the end of World War II, and she made a trip to Australia late in the year. Upon her return to the UK in early 1946, Perseus was placed in reserve. The ship was recommissioned in 1950 to serve as the trials ship for the steam catapult then under development. Over 1,600 test launches were conducted before the catapult was removed in 1952 and she was converted for use as a ferry carrier to transport aircraft, troops and equipment overseas. She was reduced to reserve again in 1954 and sold for scrap in 1958.

== Design, description and construction ==
The Colossus-class carriers were intended to meet a shortage of naval flight decks. Their design was based on that of the Illustrious class, but modified to permit rapid construction in commercial yards. Perseus was not completed to her original design; the success of the maintenance aircraft carrier Unicorn prompted modification of the ship, whilst under construction, to an aircraft maintenance ship without aircraft catapults.

Perseus had an overall length of 695 feet (211.8 m), a beam of 80 feet 4 inches (24.5 m), and a draught of 23 feet (7.0 m) at deep load. She displaced 12,265 long tons (12,462 t) at standard load. Each of the ship's two sets of Parsons geared steam turbines drove one propeller shaft. Steam was supplied by four Admiralty three-drum water-tube boilers operating at a pressure of 400 psi (2,758 kPa; 28 kgf/cm^{2}). The turbines were designed for a total of 40,000 shaft horsepower (30,000 kW) and gave Perseus a speed of 25 knots (46 km/h; 29 mph). The ship carried 3,196 long tons (3,247 t) of fuel oil which gave her a range of 8,500 nautical miles (15,700 km; 9,800 mi) at 11 knots (20 km/h; 13 mph).

In order maximize space for workshops and stores, the ship's arresting gear and catapult were not fitted and all the facilities required for flying operations were removed. Two large deckhouses were added to port of the island and on the rear of the flight deck. The ship had a single hangar, 17 feet 6 inches (5.33 m) high. Aircraft were transported between the hangars and the flight deck by two aircraft lifts (elevators); each measured 34 by 45 feet (10.4 m × 13.7 m). Two large cranes were mounted on the flight deck to move aircraft and stores to and from the flight deck. The ship carried two small self-propelled lighters to allow unflyable aircraft to be transferred between ships or to shore facilities. Bulk petrol storage consisted of 98,600 imperial gallons (448,000 L; 118,400 US gal). The ship's crew totalled 854, plus 222 in her aircraft repair department.

Aircraft could undergo maintenance, and most functional and equipment tests carried out aboard - either in the hangar or on the deck. Some components could be repaired on board, but other work was to be carried out by the workshops on the engine repair and component repair ships that would accompany the maintenance carrier.

The ship was equipped with six quadruple mounts for the 40-millimetre (1.6 in) QF 2-pounder Mk VIII gun ("pom-pom"). These gun mounts could depress to −10° and elevate to a maximum of +80°. The Mk VIII 2-pounder gun fired a 40-millimetre (1.6 in) 0.91-pound (0.41 kg) shell at a muzzle velocity of 1,920 ft/s (590 m/s) to a distance of 3,800 yards (3,500 m). The gun's rate of fire was approximately 96–98 rounds per minute. She was also fitted with 19 Bofors 40 mm autocannon in single mounts. The Bofors fired a 0.719-pound (0.326 kg) shell at a muzzle velocity of 2,890 ft/s (880 m/s). It had a rate of fire of about 120 rounds per minute and a maximum range of 10,750 yards (9,830 m). All of the guns were mounted on the flight deck, not in sponsons on the side of the hull like her half-sisters that were completed as aircraft carriers. Each "pom-pom" mount was provided with a separate fire-control director fitted with a Type 262 gunnery radar.

Perseus was ordered on 14 March 1942 under the name Edgar. She was laid down at Vickers-Armstrongs in Newcastle-upon-Tyne on 1 January 1943 and was launched on 26 March 1944. The ship was renamed Perseus in July 1944, after the decision had been made to convert her to an aircraft maintenance ship, and she was completed on 19 October 1945.

== Service ==
Perseus with two de Havilland Sea Hornets and a Short Sturgeon on deck and the experimental steam catapult fitted during trials in the early 1950s.

Perseus arrived in Portsmouth on 24 October 1945, after the end of World War II, to begin working up and sailed on 17 November for Australia. She arrived in Sydney on 21 December, just in time to take charge of winding up the "Air Train" (Note: The "Air Train" was the entire system of depots, repair centres, repair ships and ferry carriers that supplied the fleet carriers of the British Pacific Fleet with flyable aircraft.) that had supported the British Pacific Fleet. The ship departed Melbourne on 26 March 1946, carrying a load of aircraft to return to the United Kingdom, and arrived at Rosyth on 17 May where she was placed in reserve.

In 1950, Perseus was fitted with an experimental steam catapult. The catapult was placed on top of the carrier's existing flight deck and the deckhouse to port of the island was removed to accommodate it. Some 1,560 launches were made by the catapult, beginning with over 1,000 wheeled dead-loads, of gradually increasing weight, and moving on to unmanned aircraft with their wings truncated to reduce their ability to glide. The final tests were made by manned aircraft of every type flown by the Fleet Air Arm. After this, the ship arrived in Philadelphia on 14 January 1952 to demonstrate the catapult to the United States Navy. Between them, some 127 launches of manned aircraft were made by the British and the Americans. Perseus arrived back at Portsmouth on 21 March and had the catapult removed. All of her remaining maintenance equipment was removed and she was converted for use as a ferry carrier.

On 10 December, the ship carried the Westland Whirlwinds of 848 Squadron to Singapore, arriving on 8 January 1953. She arrived back at Portsmouth on 11 February and then embarked part of the 100 Grumman Avengers transferred to the Royal Navy under the terms of the Mutual Defense Assistance Act in Norfolk, Virginia, on 16 March. She arrived back in Norfolk to load the remaining aircraft on 29 April. Perseus was fitted with temporary grandstand seating ("bleachers") in June for Very Important Persons and the press during Elizabeth II's Coronation Fleet Review in Spithead. Later in the year she made a trip transporting troops and equipment to the Far East.

On 20 January 1954, 706 Squadron, a second-line unit, flew aboard to conduct trials of the anti-submarine version of the Whirlwind helicopter. They were successful enough that the squadron was redesignated as 845 Squadron afterwards and Perseus ferried them to Malta in April. The ship continued on to deliver relief supplies to Singapore intended for Korea and was reduced to reserve again upon her return on 12 July. The Admiralty intended to convert her to a submarine depot ship and she was towed to Belfast to begin work in 1955. The cutbacks from the 1957 Defence White Paper caused the conversion to be cancelled and the ship was towed to Gare Loch to await a decision on the ship's disposition. Perseus sold for scrap in May 1958 and towed to Port Glasgow to begin demolition.

== See also ==
- List of aircraft maintenance carriers of the Royal Navy
