= HMS Unicorn (I72) =

1943 unique light aircraft carrier of the Royal Navy

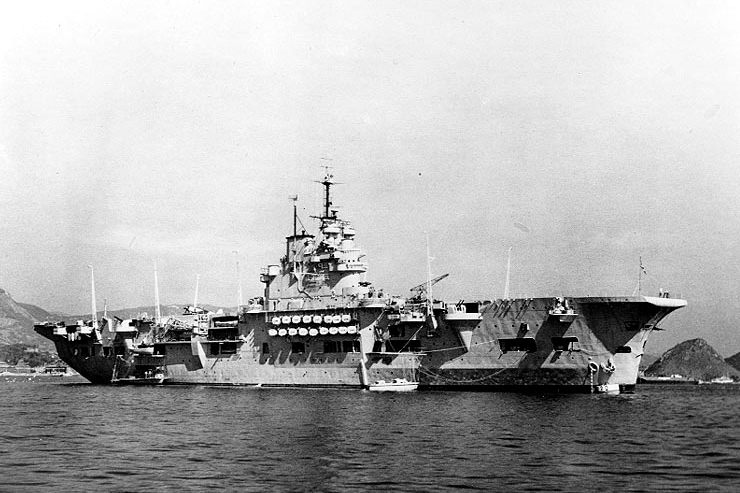
- Unicorn at a Japanese port (probably Sasebo)

History

United Kingdom
- Name: Unicorn
- Namesake: Unicorn
- Ordered: 14 April 1939
- Builder: Harland and Wolff, Belfast, Northern Ireland
- Cost: £2,531,000
- Yard number: 1031
- Laid down: 26 June 1939
- Launched: 20 November 1941
- Completed: 12 March 1943
- Decommissioned: January 1946
- Recommissioned: Mid-1949
- Decommissioned: 17 November 1953
- Identification: Pennant number: I72
- Fate: Scrapped, 15 June 1959

General characteristics (as completed)
- Type: Maintenance aircraft carrier
- Displacement: 16,510 long tons (16,770 t) (standard); 20,300 long tons (20,600 t) (deep load)
- Length: 640 ft (195.1 m)
- Beam: 90 ft 3 in (27.51 m)
- Draught: 23 ft (7.0 m) (deep load)
- Installed power: 4 × Admiralty 3-drum boilers; 40,000 shp (30,000 kW)
- Propulsion: 2 × shafts; 2 ×geared steam turbine sets
- Speed: 24 knots (44 km/h; 28 mph)
- Range: 7,000 nmi (13,000 km; 8,100 mi) at 13.5 knots (25.0 km/h; 15.5 mph)
- Complement: 1,200 (wartime)
- Sensors & processing systems: 1 × Type 281B Early-warning radar; 2 × Type 285 gunnery radars
- Armament: 4 × twin 4 in (102 mm) DP guns; 4 × quadruple 2-pdr (40 mm (1.6 in)) AA guns; 2 × twin, 8 × single 20 mm (0.8 in) Oerlikon AA guns
- Armour: Flight deck: 2 in (51 mm); Magazines: 2–3 in (51–76 mm); Bulkheads: 1.5 in (38 mm)
- Aircraft carried: Approximately 33 (operational use)

HMS Unicorn was an aircraft repair ship and light aircraft carrier built for the Royal Navy in the late 1930s. She was completed during World War II and provided air cover over the amphibious landing at Salerno, Italy, in September 1943. The ship was transferred to the Eastern Fleet in the Indian Ocean at the end of the year. Unicorn supported the aircraft carriers of the fleet on their operations until the British Pacific Fleet (BPF) was formed in November 1944. She was transferred to Australia in early 1945 to support the BPF's operations during Operation Iceberg, the Allied invasion of Okinawa in May. To shorten the time required to replenish the BPF's carriers, the ship was based in the Admiralty Islands and in the Philippine Islands until the Japanese surrender in August. Unicorn was decommissioned and placed in reserve when she returned to the UK in January 1946.

The ship was recommissioned in 1949 to support the light carrier of the Far East Fleet, as the Eastern Fleet had been redesignated after the end of World War II. She was unloading aircraft and equipment in Singapore in June 1950 when the Korean War began. She spent most of the war ferrying aircraft, troops, stores and equipment in support of Commonwealth operations in Korea. Unicorn supported other carriers during operations in Korea, but she became the only aircraft carrier to conduct a shore bombardment with her guns during wartime when she attacked North Korean observers on the coast during the war. The ship returned to the UK after the end of the war and was again placed in reserve. She was listed for disposal in 1958 and sold for scrap in 1959.

== Design and description ==
The Abyssinia Crisis of 1934–35 demonstrated to the Admiralty that it needed a depot ship to support the aircraft carriers in active service, just like submarine and destroyer tenders supported those types. Such a ship would be able to perform a wider range of aircraft repair and maintenance tasks than aircraft carriers and on the full range of aircraft operated by the Royal Navy, including amphibians. Admiral Reginald Henderson, Controller of the Navy was instrumental for gaining approval for the ship and ensuring that she had a complete flight deck that would allow her to land, service and launch aircraft on active operations. She was the first ship built in any navy that could "carry out the full range of aircraft maintenance and repair work in addition to the ability to operate aircraft from the flight deck". In practice, Unicorn proved the value of the concept and two similar support ships, Perseus and Pioneer were converted into aircraft maintenance ships by modifying light aircraft carriers still under construction.

Unicorn had an overall length of 640 feet (195.1 m), a beam of 90 feet 3 inches (27.5 m), and a draught of 23 feet (7.0 m) at deep load. She was somewhat overweight as completed and displaced 16,510 long tons (16,770 t) at standard load rather than her designed 14,750 long tons (14,990 t). Each of the ship's two sets of Parsons geared steam turbines drove one 15-foot (4.6 m) propeller. Steam was supplied by six Admiralty three-drum water-tube boilers operating at a pressure of 400 psi (2,758 kPa; 28 kgf/cm^{2}). The turbines were designed for a total of 40,000 shaft horsepower (30,000 kW) and gave Unicorn a speed of 24 knots (44 km/h; 28 mph). The ship carried 3,000 long tons (3,000 t) of fuel oil which gave her a range of 7,000 nautical miles (13,000 km; 8,100 mi) at 13.5 knots (25.0 km/h; 15.5 mph).

In order to land aircraft aboard, Unicorn was designed with a full-length, 600-foot (180 m)-long flight deck with arresting gear. She was also fitted with a catapult capable of launching a 14,000-pound (6,400 kg) aircraft to a speed of 66 knots (122 km/h; 76 mph). The ship had two hangars, each 16 feet 6 inches (5.03 m) high. The upper hangar was 324ft by 65ft, and the lower 360ft by 62ft. Aircraft were transported between the hangars and the flight deck by two aircraft lifts (elevators); the forward lift measured 33 by 45 feet (10.1 m × 13.7 m) and the rear one 24 by 46 feet (7.3 m × 14.0 m). Unicorn could carry about 36 operational aircraft. Bulk petrol storage consisted of 36,500 imperial gallons (166,000 L; 43,800 US gal). During wartime, the ship's crew totaled 1200. The ship carried a self-propelled lighter under the rear of the flight deck to allow unflyable aircraft to be transferred between ships or to shore facilities. This lighter was lowered flush with the upper hangar deck so that an aircraft could be rolled onto it or an aircraft could be lifted onto it once the lighter was in the water.

Unicorn was armed with four twin mounts for the 45-calibre QF 4-inch Mk XVI dual purpose gun. This mounting could elevate from −10 to +80°. The Mk XVI gun fired about 12 35-pound (16 kg) high-explosive shells per minute at a muzzle velocity of 2,660 ft/s (810 m/s). Against surface targets it had a range of 19,850 yards (18,150 m) and a maximum ceiling of 39,000 ft (12,000 m), but an effective anti-aircraft range of much less. She was also equipped with four quadruple mounts for the 40-millimetre (1.6 in) QF 2-pounder Mk VIII gun ("pom-pom"). These gun mounts could depress to −10° and elevate to a maximum of +80°. The Mk VIII 2-pounder gun fired a 40-millimetre (1.6 in) 2-pound (0.91 kg) shell at a muzzle velocity of 1,920 ft/s (590 m/s) to a distance of 3,800 yards (3,500 m). The gun's rate of fire was approximately 96–98 rounds per minute. Close-range air defence was provided by twelve 20 mm (0.8 in) Oerlikon autocannon, in two twin mounts and eight single ones. The Oerlikon fired a 0.272-pound (0.123 kg) shell at a muzzle velocity of 2,750 ft/s (840 m/s). It had a rate of fire of 465–480 rounds per minute and a maximum range of 4,800 yards (4,400 m).

The ship was equipped with two HACS (High Angle Control System) directors on her island and each "pom-pom" mount had its own director as well. Unicorn was the first ship to mount a Type 281B early-warning radar, and each HACS director was fitted with a Type 285 gunnery radar.

== Construction and service ==
Unicorn was ordered on 14 April 1939, and laid down at Harland and Wolff in Belfast, Northern Ireland on 29 June. Her construction was delayed several times in favour of higher priority projects and she was not launched until 20 November 1941. The ship was completed on 12 March 1943. In order to accelerate the ship's completion, the Admiralty decided in 1942 that she would not be equipped with her full suite of maintenance and repair equipment. Excluding her armament, Unicorn cost £2,531,000. (Note: The name Unicorn already in use by the 1824-built wooden frigate Unicorn, which was being used as a drill ship in Dundee, Scotland. The frigate's name was changed to Unicorn II in February 1939, then to HMS Cressy on 20 November 1941. The frigate regained her original name on 14 July 1959 after the carrier was scrapped.)

Whilst working up, 818 and 824 Squadrons flew aboard in April 1943; 818 Squadron had nine Fairey Swordfish torpedo bombers and 824 Squadron had six. 887 Squadron, with nine Supermarine Seafire IIC fighters was also embarked. In late May, Unicorn escorted Convoy MKF 15 to Gibraltar while carrying a number of Royal Air Force Bristol Beaufighters that she off-loaded there. She escorted the returning convoy back to the Clyde in early June. Together with the aircraft carrier Illustrious, the ship made a sweep towards the Norwegian coast as part of Operation Governor, a diversion for the Allied landings in Sicily in early July. For this operation, 887 Squadron was replaced by 800 Squadron with Hawker Sea Hurricanes.

Unicorn was assigned to Force V, a flotilla of British carriers, commanded by Admiral Philip Vian, intended to provide air cover to Operation Avalanche, the Allied landings at Salerno. In preparation for this mission, the ship disembarked all of her Swordfish, except for three from 818 Squadron for self-defence and the Sea Hurricanes of 800 Squadron. They were replaced by Seafires of 809 and 897 Squadrons. Each of the Seafire squadrons had 10 aircraft, for a total of 33. Unicorn joined the escort carriers of Force V in August at Gibraltar before they moved forward to the Central Mediterranean for intensive training prior to the commencement of the amphibious landing on 9 September.

The ship's Seafires flew 75 sorties on the first day of operations and 60 on 10 September but the Seafire was not well suited to carrier landings in low wind conditions and many were damaged in landing accidents. 44 sorties were flown on 11 September and only 18 on 12 September, even though Unicorn's mechanics had managed to repair ten Seafires over the previous night. The fighter shortage grew so acute during the operation that fighters from the carriers Illustrious and Formidable, intended to provide distant cover against an attempt by the Italian fleet to interfere with the invasion, staged forward to Unicorn in order to provide air cover over the landings. By 12 September, the situation had improved so that 887 Squadron was able to fly off six Seafires to a temporary airfield ashore. The ship returned to the UK on 20 September with a full load of damaged Seafires, in addition to her own aircraft, that were off-loaded at Glasgow to be repaired. Afterwards, she was refitted by her builders and reconfigured for her designed role as an aircraft repair ship.

=== In the Far East ===
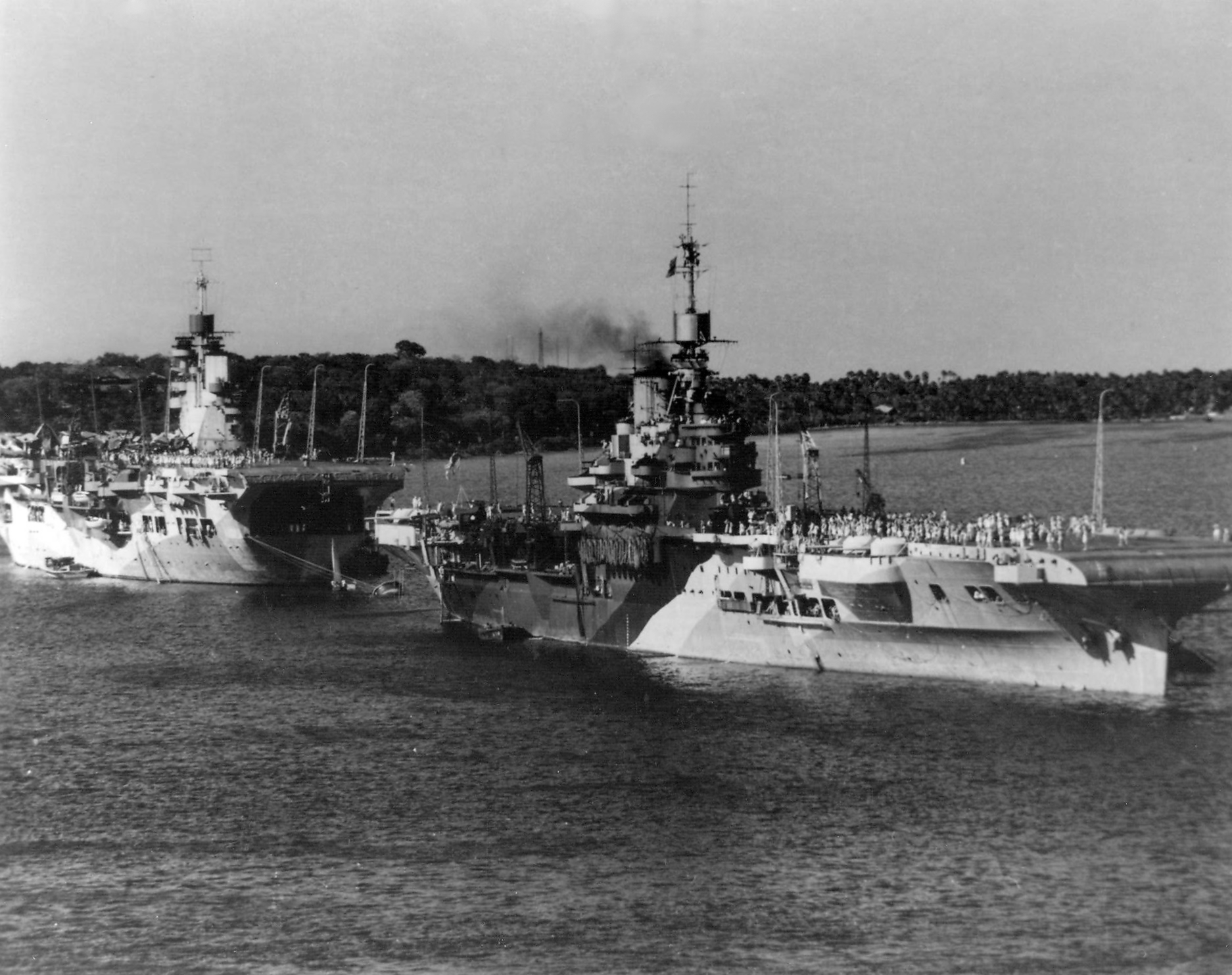
Unicorn and Illustrious in Ceylon, 1944

At the end of December 1943, Unicorn joined Illustrious, the battlecruiser Renown and the battleships Queen Elizabeth and Valiant, the other reinforcements for the Eastern Fleet. Only four Swordfish from 818 Squadron were carried aboard at this time. The ship delivered a consignment of aircraft to Royal Navy Air Station Cochin, India, on 27 January 1944 before arriving at Trincomalee, Ceylon on 2 February. In addition to her repair duties, the ship was often used for deck-landing practice. She was given a brief refit in Bombay during May. On 23 August, 818 Squadron was transferred to Atheling and later disbanded. On 7 November, 817 Squadron flew aboard to provide anti-submarine protection with its Fairey Barracudas as Unicorn was ordered to Durban, South Africa. There she was to be modified with separate workshops and additional equipment to accommodate American engines which used different screw threads and electrical fittings.

That same month, Unicorn was transferred to the new BPF. She left Durban on 1 January 1945 and arrived at Colombo, Ceylon where she conducted deck-landing practice for pilots new to the BPF. The ship loaded 82 aircraft and 120 engines later in the month for transport to Australia, emptying the stocks of the Eastern Fleet, and departed for Sydney on 29 January. Unicorn arrived on 12 February and disembarked her stored aircraft. She sailed for Manus Island, in the Admiralty Islands, on 28 February to support the BPF's training before the opening stages of Operation Iceberg. The ship arrived at San Pedro Bay, Philippines on 27 March which was to serve as the BPF's intermediate replenishment base while it supported Operation Iceberg.

The BPF was to attack Japanese airfields in the Sakishima Islands and Formosa before and during the early stages of the invasion of Okinawa. Unicorn was primarily engaged in preparing aircraft for issue to the operational squadrons aboard the fleet carriers, rather than repair them, but she did repair, modify or service 105 aircraft in March–May 1945. The ship sailed for Australia on 22 May and arrived in Sydney on 1 June. She sailed for Brisbane on 6 June to have her bottom cleaned at the Cairncross Dockyard and to load more replacement aircraft. Unicorn arrived at Manus on 22 July to prepare for operations off Japan. She was still there when Japan surrendered on 15 August. The ship began to ferry aircraft, equipment and men back to Australia after the surrender, a task which ended on 6 November, when she arrived at Sydney. Unicorn departed for home in December 1945 and arrived in Plymouth in January 1946. She was decommissioned and placed in reserve.

=== Post-war ===
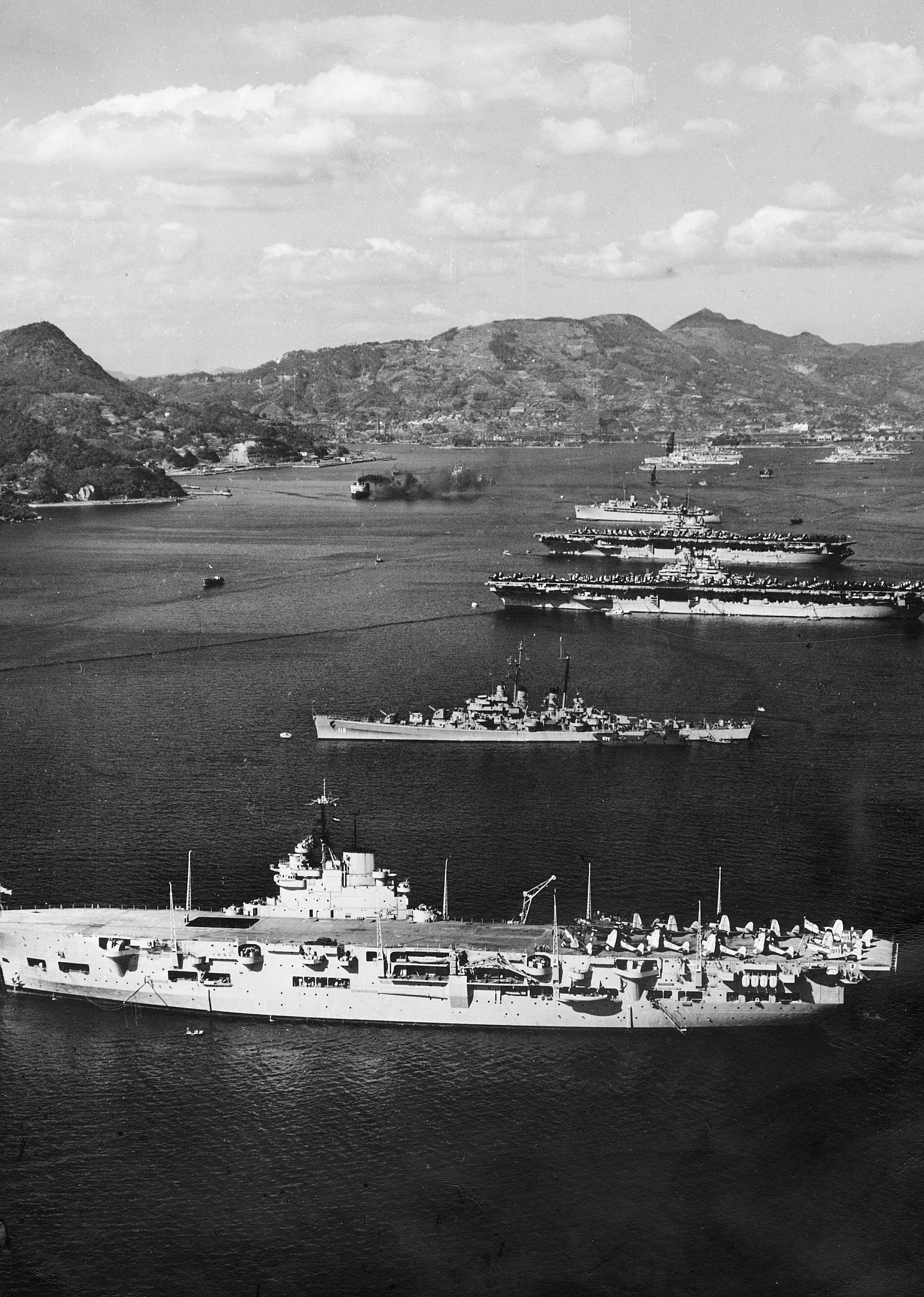
HMS Unicorn with U.S. Navy ships at Sasebo, Japan, 1950

In 1949, Unicorn was reactivated for service in the Far East, in support of the carrier Triumph. She sailed from HMNB Devonport on 22 September with a cargo of Seafires and Fireflies. When the Korean War broke out in June 1950, the ship was disembarking aircraft, equipment and her maintenance personnel at RAF Sembawang, Singapore in preparation to return home and then to reserve. The Admiralty ordered her to be used as a replenishment carrier to ferry replacement aircraft and supplies to the Royal Navy and Commonwealth aircraft carriers operating in Korean waters. Unicorn left Singapore on 11 July and arrived at Sasebo, Japan, on 20 July and transferred seven Seafires and five Fireflies to Triumph. In August, the ship ferried the 1st Battalion of the Middlesex Regiment and the Headquarters of the 27th Brigade from Hong Kong to Pusan, arriving on 29 August. She delivered supplies to Sasebo before returning to Singapore to begin a refit.

Unicorn resumed her duties in December, carrying about 400 troops in addition to the usual aircraft, stores and equipment. She was used by pilots for deck-landing practice en route. In March, she ferried the Gloster Meteor jet fighters of No. 77 Squadron RAAF to Iwakuni, Japan. The ship remained there for the next three months so she could be used as an accommodation ship. Afterwards, Unicorn resumed her role as a ferry carrier. Whilst passing through the Shimonoseki Strait on 2 October, she destroyed the overhead power cables stretching between Honshu and Kyushu as they were sagging lower than normal due to a heavy snowfall. On 21 November, Unicorn and the carrier Warrior exchanged crews at Singapore and the ship began a refit shortly afterwards. After her refit was completed on 20 January 1952, she returned to her ferry duties. In April, she was "adopted" by the Middlesex Regiment (possibly one of only three ships to be honoured by an Army regiment). During operations by Ocean in July, the ship acted as a spare flight deck to allow for damaged aircraft to land without disrupting the strike operations. She arrived back at Singapore on 27 July to load more replacement aircraft, including Meteors, and sailed on 9 August for Japan. During September, Unicorn borrowed four of Ocean's Hawker Sea Fury fighters to fly combat air patrols over the fleet whilst the latter ship conducted strike operations. She was docked for maintenance in October, and embarked the First Sea Lord, Admiral Rhoderick McGrigor and the Commander-in-Chief, Far East Station for a tour of Commonwealth forces in Japan. At one point, Unicorn became the only aircraft carrier in history so far to conduct a shore bombardment during wartime when she engaged North Korean coastwatchers at Chopekki Point.

The ship returned to Singapore for another refit on 15 December and did not leave Singapore until 17 July 1953. On 26 July, en route for Japan, Unicorn received a distress call from SS Inchkilda south of the Wuqiu region in the Taiwan Strait, saying that she was under attack by pirates, three gunboats of the ROC Anti-Communist National Salvation Army (ACNSA). The carrier closed on the freighter's position at high speed and the pirates abandoned their prize when Unicorn circled the freighter with all guns bearing at less than 3,000 yd (2,700 m). The Korean Armistice Agreement came into effect the following day, but the ship accompanied Ocean on two patrols on 30 July and 25–29 August to monitor North Korean compliance with the terms of the armistice. She sailed for home on 15 October and arrived at Devonport on 17 November, where she returned to reserve.

=== Disposal ===
In 1951, Unicorn was considered for modernisation to make her capable of operating modern, heavier jet aircraft. This would have required fitting of a steam catapult, reinforcing her flight deck to handle heavier aircraft and moving and enlarging her forward lift to make room for the new catapult and larger aircraft. A new crane would also have been necessary to handle the heavier aircraft. The Director of Naval Construction proposed to combine both of her hangars into a single one to eliminate problems with hangar height, but this was rejected because of the excessive cost. This reconstruction would have begun in July 1954, but the entire scheme was cancelled in November 1952 because providing existing carriers with angled flight decks was much more important. Unicorn was named as a Ferry Carrier in June 1953. The ship was reduced to extended reserve in March 1957 and placed on the disposal list in 1958. Unicorn was sold for scrap in June 1959 and arrived at Dalmuir on 15 June to begin the process. Her hull was broken up at Troon in 1960.

== See also ==
- Aircraft maintenance carriers of the Royal Navy
