= HMS Pioneer (R76) =

1945 Colossus-class aircraft-maintenance ship of the Royal Navy

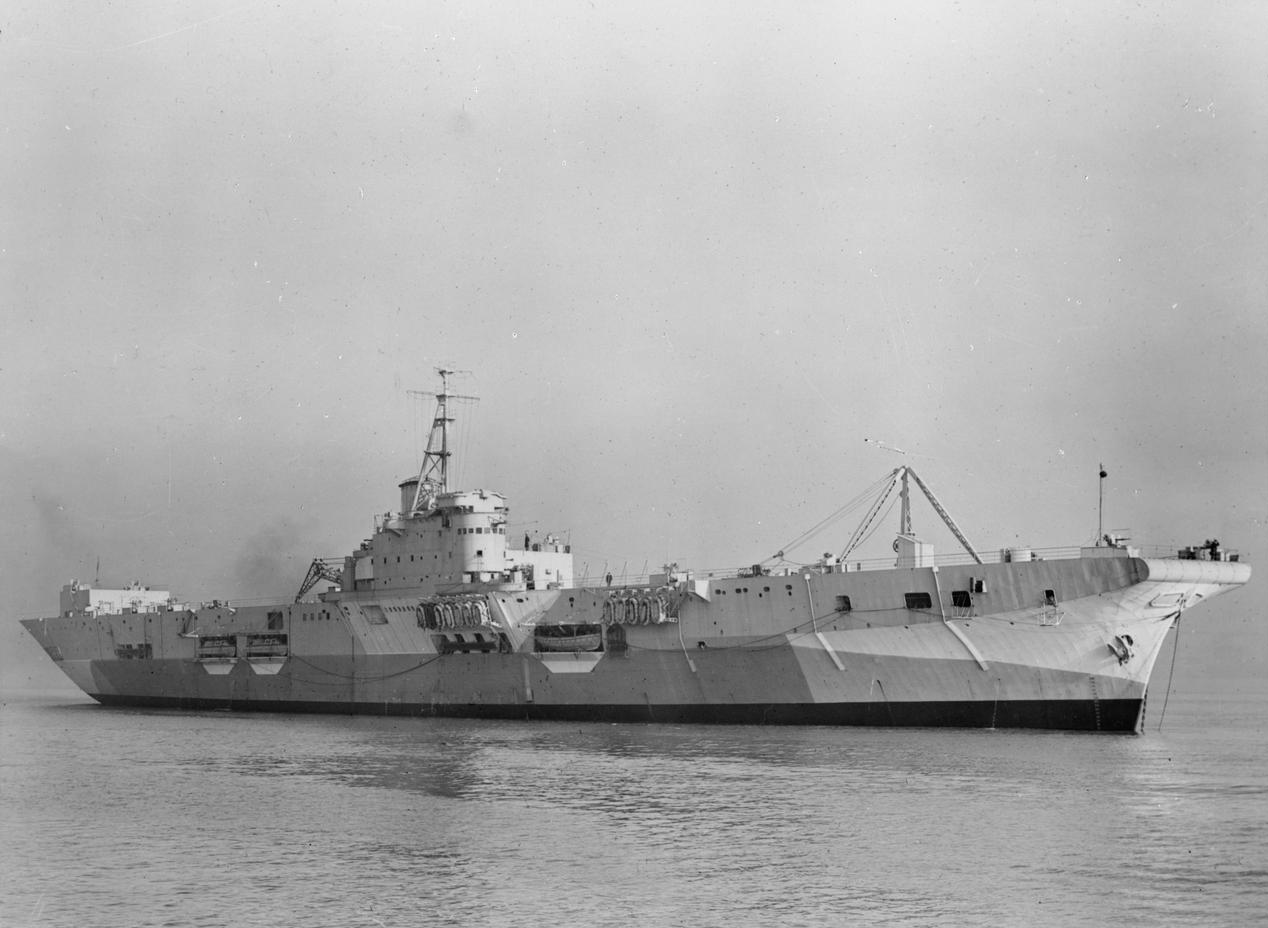
- Pioneer at anchor, 3 February 1945

History

United Kingdom
- Name: Pioneer
- Ordered: 7 August 1942
- Builder: Vickers-Armstrongs, Barrow-in-Furness
- Laid down: 2 December 1942
- Launched: 20 May 1944
- Completed: 8 February 1945
- Decommissioned: 1954
- Identification: Pennant number: R76
- Fate: Sold for scrap, September 1954

General characteristics
- Class & type: Colossus-class aircraft-maintenance ship
- Displacement: 12,265 long tons (12,462 t) (standard); 16,500 long tons (16,800 t) (deep load)
- Length: 695 ft (211.8 m)
- Beam: 80 ft 4 in (24.49 m)
- Draught: 23 ft (7.0 m) (deep load)
- Installed power: 4 × Admiralty 3-drum boilers; 40,000 shp (30,000 kW)
- Propulsion: 2 × shafts; 2 × geared steam turbine sets
- Speed: 25 knots (46 km/h; 29 mph)
- Range: 12,000 nmi (22,000 km; 14,000 mi) at 14 knots (26 km/h; 16 mph)
- Complement: 1,076
- Sensors & processing systems: 6 × Type 262 gunnery radars
- Armament: 6 × quadruple 2-pdr 40 mm (1.6 in) AA guns; 19 × single 40 mm Bofors AA guns
- Aircraft carried: None

HMS Pioneer was a Colossus-class aircraft carrier built for the Royal Navy during World War II. She was modified whilst under construction into an aircraft maintenance carrier. The ship arrived in Australia in mid-1945 to support operations by the British Pacific Fleet against Japanese forces. She supported the British attacks on the Japanese Home Islands from mid-June until the end of the war in August from a base in the Admiralty Islands. The ship and her facilities were used to help repair Hong Kong's infrastructure in late 1945 and she returned to the UK in early 1946. Pioneer was immediately placed in reserve upon her arrival and she was sold in 1954 for scrap.

== Design, description and construction ==
The Colossus-class aircraft carriers were intended to meet a shortage of naval flight decks. Their design was based on that of the Illustrious-class aircraft carriers, but modified to permit rapid construction in commercial yards. Pioneer was not completed to her original design; the success of the maintenance aircraft carrier Unicorn prompted modification of the ship, whilst under construction, to an aircraft maintenance ship without aircraft catapults.

Pioneer had an overall length of 695 feet (211.8 m), a beam of 80 feet 4 inches (24.5 m), and a draught of 23 feet (7.0 m) at deep load. She displaced 12,000 long tons (12,000 t) at standard load. Each of the ship's two sets of Parsons geared steam turbines drove one propeller shaft. Steam was supplied by four Admiralty three-drum water-tube boilers operating at a pressure of 400 psi (2,758 kPa; 28 kgf/cm^{2}). The turbines were designed for a total of 40,000 shaft horsepower (30,000 kW) and gave Pioneer a speed of 25 knots (46 km/h; 29 mph). The ship carried 3,196 long tons (3,247 t) of fuel oil which gave her a range of 8,500 nautical miles (15,700 km; 9,800 mi) at 11 knots (20 km/h; 13 mph).

In order to maximize space for workshops and stores, the ship's arresting gear and catapult were not fitted; two large deckhouses were added to port of the island and on the rear of the flight deck. The ship had a single hangar, 17 feet 6 inches (5.33 m) high. Aircraft were transported between the hangars and the flight deck by two aircraft lifts; each measured 34 by 45 feet (10.4 m × 13.7 m). Two large cranes were mounted on the flight deck to move aircraft and stores to and from the flight deck. The ship carried two small self-propelled lighters to allow unflyable aircraft to be transferred between ships or to shore facilities. Bulk petrol storage consisted of 98,600 imperial gallons (448,000 L; 118,400 US gal). The ship's crew totaled 854, plus 222 in her aircraft repair department.

The ship was equipped with six quadruple mounts for the 40-millimetre (1.6 in) QF 2-pounder Mk VIII gun ("pom-pom"). These gun mounts could depress to −10° and elevate to a maximum of +80°. The Mk VIII 2-pounder gun fired a 40-millimetre (1.6 in) shell to a distance of 3,800 yards (3,500 m) at a rate of fire of approximately 96–98 rounds per minute per barrel. She was also fitted with 19 Bofors 40 mm guns in single mounts. The Bofors had a rate of fire of about 120 rounds per minute and a maximum range of 10,750 yards (9,830 m). All of the guns were mounted on the flight deck, not in sponsons on the side of the hull like her half-sisters that were completed as aircraft carriers. Each "pom-pom" mount was provided with a separate fire-control director fitted with a Type 262 gunnery radar.

Pioneer was ordered on 7 August 1942 under the name Ethalion, but was renamed Mars later in 1942. She was laid down at Vickers-Armstrongs in Barrow-in-Furness on 2 December and was launched on 20 May 1944 The ship was renamed Pioneer in July 1944 after the decision had been made to convert her to an aircraft maintenance ship. and was completed on 8 February 1945.

== Service ==
Pioneer about to depart from Sydney in January 1946 to dump surplus aircraft into the ocean

After working up, Pioneer sailed for Australia on 30 March 1945. She arrived in Sydney on 13 May and was transferred to Manus Island, in the Admiralty Islands, on 21 June to prepare for operations off Japan. She was still there when Japan surrendered on 15 August and had repaired 24 aircraft since her arrival. Pioneer arrived in Hong Kong in late September to help with the rebuilding of the colony's infrastructure. Her sailors restored power, telephone service and repaired trains and busses . She made one trip back to Manus, but was back in Hong Kong in late November. The ship sailed for Sydney the following month and departed for the UK on 17 February 1946. Upon her arrival, she was placed in reserve. Pioneer was sold to Thos. W. Ward for scrap in September 1954 and broken up in Inverkeithing.

== See also ==
- List of aircraft maintenance carriers of the Royal Navy
