= MV Ancylus =

Oil tanker

History

United Kingdom
- Name: MV Ancylus
- Operator: Anglo Saxon Royal Dutch/Shell
- Builder: Swan Hunter
- Launched: 9 October 1934
- Renamed: Imbricaria, 1952
- Honours and awards: Atlantic (1943-1944)
- Fate: Scrapped La Spezia 1954

General characteristics
- Tonnage: 8,017 GRT
- Length: 465 ft (142 m) (pp) 482.75 ft (147.14 m) (oa)
- Beam: 59 ft (18 m)
- Draught: 27 ft 6 in (8.38 m)
- Propulsion: Diesel; one shaft; 3,500bhp
- Speed: 13 knots (24 km/h)
- Complement: 100
- Armament: 1 × 4 in (100 mm); 8 × 20 mm
- Aircraft carried: Four Fairey Swordfish

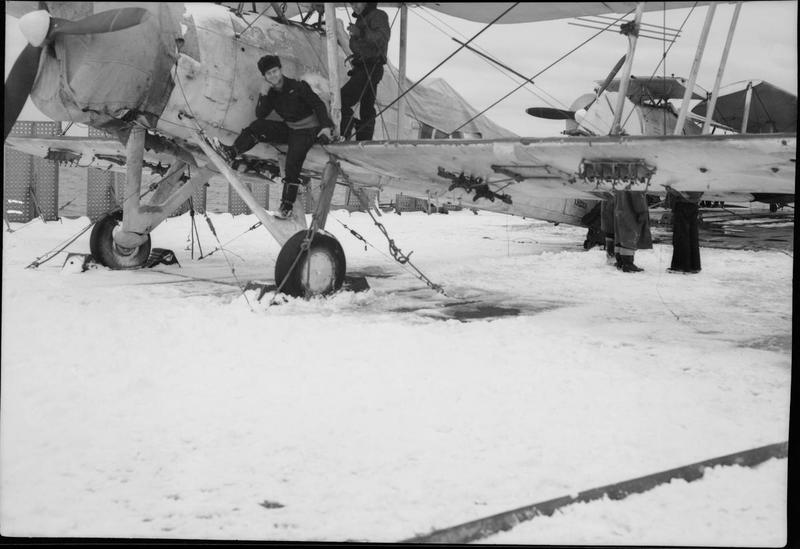
Two Fairey Swordfish on the snow-covered flight deck of the MV Ancylus.

MV Ancylus was one of nine Anglo Saxon Royal Dutch/Shell oil tankers converted to become a Merchant Aircraft Carrier (MAC ship). The group is collectively known as the Rapana class.

MV Ancylus was built at Swan Hunter and completed in January, 1935 as an oil tanker for the Anglo Saxon Royal Dutch/Shell line. She was converted to a MAC ship, entering service in October, 1943.

As a MAC ship, she had no aircraft hangar, and continued to carry normal cargoes, although operating under Royal Navy control. Only her air crew and the necessary maintenance staff were naval personnel.

At the end of the war, Ancylus was reconverted to an oil tanker, being renamed Imbricaria in 1952. She served in this capacity until broken up for scrap at La Spezia in December 1954.
