= MV Amastra =

History

United Kingdom
- Name: MV Amastra
- Operator: Anglo Saxon Royal Dutch/Shell
- Builder: Lithgows
- Launched: 18 December 1934
- Commissioned: 1935
- Renamed: Idas
- Fate: Scrapped La Spezia 1955

General characteristics
- Tonnage: 8,031 GRT
- Length: 465 ft (142 m) (pp) 482.75 ft (147.14 m) (oa)
- Beam: 59 ft (18 m)
- Draught: 27 ft 6 in (8.38 m)
- Propulsion: Diesel; one shaft; 3,500bhp
- Speed: 13 knots (24 km/h)
- Complement: 100
- Armament: 1 × 4 in (100 mm); 8 × 20 mm
- Aircraft carried: Four Fairey Swordfish

MV Amastra was one of nine Anglo-Saxon Royal Dutch/Shell oil tankers converted to become a Merchant Aircraft Carrier (MAC ship). The group is collectively known as the Rapana class.

MV Amastra was built at Lithgows and completed in March, 1935 as an oil tanker for the Royal Dutch/Shell line. She was converted at Smiths Dock, North Shields to a MAC ship, entering service in September 1943.

As a MAC ship, she had no aircraft hangar, and continued to carry cargo, although operating under Royal Navy control. Only her air crew and the necessary maintenance staff were naval personnel.

At the end of the war, Amastra was reconverted to an oil tanker, and in 1951 was renamed Idas. She served in this capacity until broken up for scrap at La Spezia in June 1955.
