= MV Miralda =

History

United Kingdom
- Name: MV Miralda
- Owner: Anglo Saxon Royal Dutch/Shell
- Operator: Anglo Saxon Royal Dutch/Shell
- Builder: Nederlandsche Scheepsbouw Maatschappij, Amsterdam
- Launched: 24 April 1936
- Renamed: Marisa 1950
- Fate: Scrapped Hong Kong 1960

General characteristics
- Tonnage: 8,003 GRT
- Length: 463 ft (141 m) (pp) 481 ft (147 m) (oa)
- Beam: 59 ft (18 m)
- Draught: 27 ft 6 in (8.38 m)
- Propulsion: Diesel; one shaft; 4,000 bhp
- Speed: 13 knots (24 km/h)
- Complement: 100
- Armament: 1 × 4 in (100 mm); 8 × 20 mm
- Aircraft carried: Four Fairey Swordfish

MV Miralda was one of nine Anglo Saxon Royal Dutch/Shell oil tankers converted to become a Merchant Aircraft Carrier (MAC ship). The group is collectively known as the Rapana class.

Macoma was launched in July 1936 at Nederlandsche Scheepsbouw Maatschappij, Amsterdam as an oil tanker. Her conversion to a MAC ship was completed in January 1944.

As a MAC ship, she had no aircraft hangar, and continued to carry normal cargoes, although operating under Royal Navy control. Only her air crew and the necessary maintenance staff were naval personnel. The British Ship Adoption Society, a Maritime Charity, was formed in the early part of the Second World War, with a large number of schools taking part in the scheme, amassing comforts for a particular ship and in return the children would receive letters of thanks and news from various ports around the world to which it would sail. the M.V Miralda was adopted by Styal Cottage Homes, a home colony and school for orphaned and destitute children of Manchester.

After the war, Miralda was reconverted and returned to merchant service as an oil tanker and served in that role until scrapped in Hong Kong in 1960. She was renamed Marisa in 1950.
