= Special 2TL Type escort carrier =

Escort carrier class of the Imperial Japanese Navy

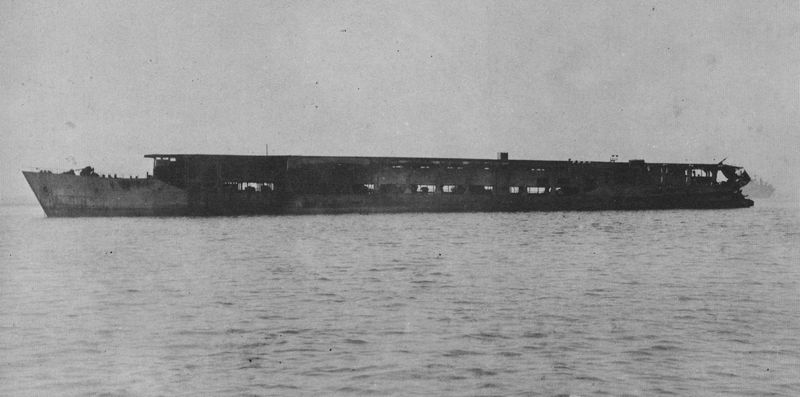
- Special 2TL Type

Class overview
- Builders: Mitsubishi Heavy Industries
- Operators: Imperial Japanese Army
- Preceded by: Special 1TL Type escort carrier
- Succeeded by: Special 3TL Type
- Built: 1944–1945
- In commission: 1945
- Planned: 2
- Completed: 1
- Canceled: 1
- Lost: 1

General characteristics
- Type: Escort carrier
- Displacement: 16,119 t (15,864 long tons)
- Length: 157.5 m (516 ft 9 in)
- Beam: 20.48 m (67 ft 2 in)
- Draught: 9 m (29 ft 6 in)
- Installed power: 2 boilers; 4,500 shp (3,400 kW)
- Propulsion: 1 shaft; 1 geared steam turbine
- Speed: 15 knots (28 km/h; 17 mph)
- Range: 9,000 nmi (17,000 km; 10,000 mi) at 13 knots (24 km/h; 15 mph)
- Complement: 221
- Armament: 16 × 25 mm (1 in) AA guns; 120 depth charges
- Aircraft carried: 8

The Special 2TL Type (特2TL型, Toku 2TL gata) was a class of auxiliary escort carriers built for the Imperial Japanese Army during World War II. They were converted from Type 2TL tankers. It is also called the Yamashio Maru (山汐丸) class in some western sources.

Only the name ship was completed during the war and she was sunk by American aircraft before she could be used.

== Construction ==
In 1944, the Japanese Army, which had already converted two passenger liners into combined assault ship and aircraft carriers, decided to acquire its own escort carriers to provide aerial anti-submarine cover for troop convoys. It therefore chartered two partly built Type 2TL Tankers, Yamashio Maru and Chigusa Maru, for conversion to auxiliary escort carriers.

The conversion was extremely simple, with a 107-metre (351 ft 1 in)-long flush flight deck added. There was no hangar, the ship's eight Ki-76s being stored on deck. Defensive armament consisted of sixteen 25 mm anti-aircraft guns, with a depth charge projector forward.

== Operational history ==
Yamashio Maru commissioned on 27 January 1945 and was sunk at Yokohama harbor by US aircraft on 17 February. Plans were drawn up for conversion to a coal-burning freighter, but she was never used as a carrier. Her sister ships, Chigusa Maru and Zuiun Maru, were incomplete when Japan surrendered and served after the war as tankers:

Chigusa Maru was sunk in 1945. The ship was repaired as tanker in 1945 and scrapped in Sasebo in June 1963. Zuiun Maru was scrapped in Oskata on 15 June 1964.

== Photo ==
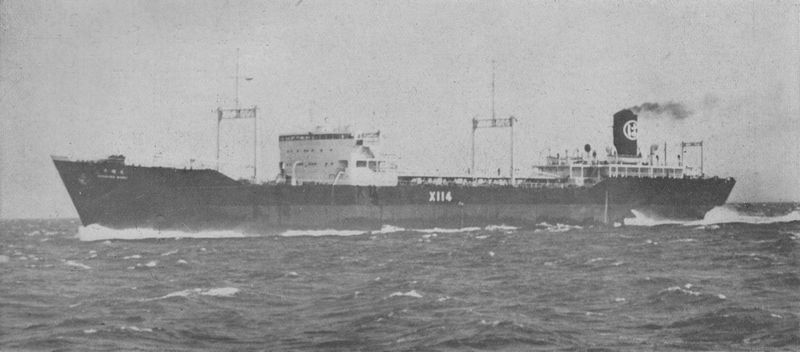
Chigusa Maru postwar (2nd sister)

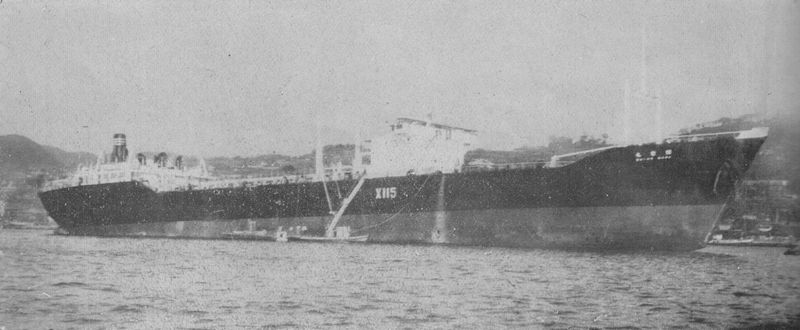
Zuiun Maru postwar (3rd sister)

== See also ==
- Imperial Japanese Army Railways and Shipping Section

== Bibliography ==
- Chesneau, Roger (1995). Aircraft Carriers of the World, 1914 to the Present: An Illustrated Encyclopedia (New, revised ed.). Annapolis, Maryland: Naval Institute Press. ISBN 0-87021-902-2.
- Fukui, Shizuo (1991). Japanese Naval Vessels at the End of World War II. London: Greenhill Books. ISBN 1-85367-125-8.
- Jentschura, Hansgeorg; Jung, Dieter & Mickel, Peter (1977). Warships of the Imperial Japanese Navy, 1869–1945. Annapolis, Maryland: United States Naval Institute. ISBN 0-87021-893-X.
- Lengerer, Hans (2023). The Aircraft Carriers of the Imperial Japanese Navy and Army: Technical and Operational History. Vol. II. Katowice, Poland: Model Hobby. ISBN 978-83-60041-71-0.
- Polmar, Norman; Genda, Minoru (2006). Aircraft Carriers: A History of Carrier Aviation and Its Influence on World Events. Vol. 1, 1909–1945. Washington, D.C.: Potomac Books. ISBN 1-57488-663-0.
- Sturton, Ian (1980). "Japan". In Chesneau, Roger (ed.). Conway's All the World's Fighting Ships 1922–1946. Greenwich, UK: Conway Maritime Press. pp. 167–217. ISBN 0-85177-146-7.
