= MV Adula =

History

United Kingdom
- Name: MV Adula
- Operator: Anglo Saxon Royal Dutch/Shell
- Builder: Blytheswood
- Launched: 28 January 1937
- Fate: Scrapped Briton Ferry 1953

General characteristics
- Tonnage: 8,040 GRT
- Length: 465 ft (142 m) (pp) 482.75 ft (147.14 m) (oa)
- Beam: 59 ft (18 m)
- Draught: 27 ft 6 in (8.38 m)
- Propulsion: Diesel; one shaft; 3,500bhp
- Speed: 13 knots (24 km/h)
- Complement: 100
- Armament: 1 × 4 in (100 mm); 8 × 20 mm
- Aircraft carried: Four Fairey Swordfish

MV Adula was one of nine Royal Dutch/Shell oil tankers converted to become a Merchant Aircraft Carrier (MAC ship). The group is collectively known as the Rapana class.

MV Adula was built at Blytheswood and completed in March, 1937 as an oil tanker for the Royal Dutch/Shell line. She was converted at Falmouth to a MAC ship, entering service in February 1944.

As a MAC ship, she had no aircraft hangar, and continued to carry normal cargoes, although operating under Royal Navy control. Only her air crew and the necessary maintenance staff were naval personnel.

At the end of the war, Adula was reconverted to an oil tanker. She served in this capacity until broken up for scrap at Briton Ferry in May 1953.
