= Special 1TL Type escort carrier =

Escort carrier class of the Imperial Japanese Navy

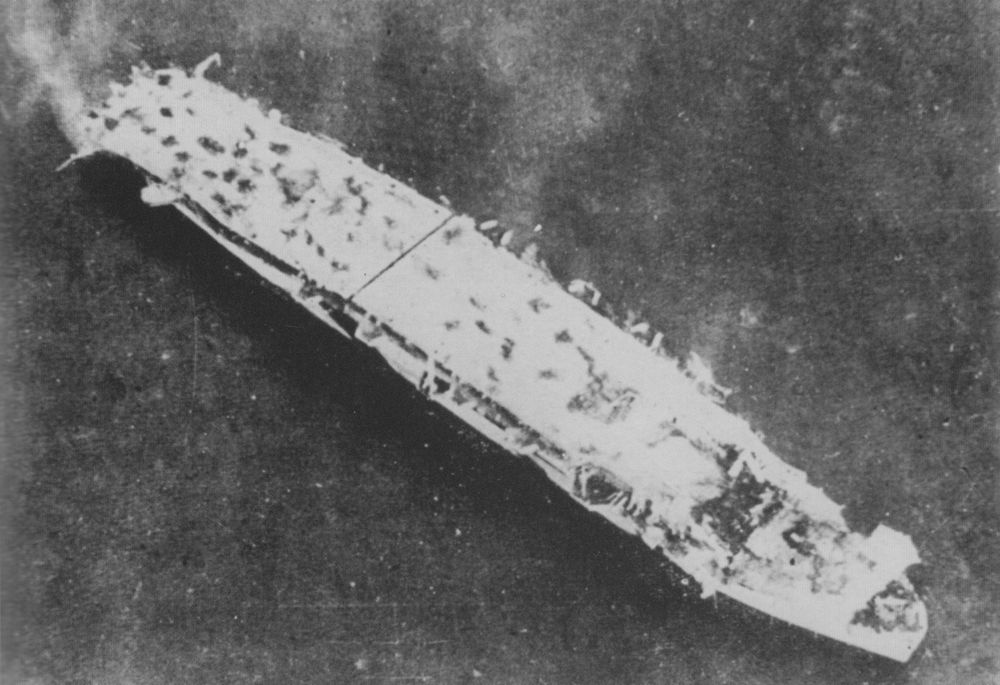
- Shimane Maru, 28 July 1945

Class overview
- Name: Special 1TL Type
- Builders: Kawasaki Shipbuilding Corporation
- Operators: Imperial Japanese Navy
- Preceded by: Shinyo / Kawasaki-type oiler
- Succeeded by: Special 2TL Type escort carrier
- Built: 1944–1945
- In commission: 1945
- Planned: 4
- Completed: 1
- Canceled: 2
- Lost: 2

General characteristics
- Type: Escort carrier
- Tonnage: 10,002 gross register tons (GRT)
- Displacement: 11,989 tonnes (11,800 long tons) (standard)
- Length: 160.5 m (527 ft) (o/a)
- Beam: 20 m (66 ft)
- Draught: 9.1 m (29 ft 10 in) (mean)
- Installed power: 2 boilers; 8,600 shp (6,400 kW)
- Propulsion: 1 shaft; 1 steam turbine
- Speed: 18.5 knots (34.3 km/h; 21.3 mph)
- Range: 10,000 nmi (19,000 km; 12,000 mi) at 10 knots (19 km/h; 12 mph)
- Sensors & processing systems: Type 3, Mark 1, Model 3 radar
- Armament: 2 × single 12 cm (4.7 in) guns; 9 × triple, 25 × single 2.5 cm (1 in) AA guns
- Aircraft carried: 12

The Special 1TL Type (特1TL型, Toku 1TL gata) was a class of auxiliary escort carriers built for the Imperial Japanese Navy (IJN) during World War II. They were converted from Type 1TL tankers. It is also called the Shimane Maru (しまね丸) class in some western sources.

Although four conversions were reportedly considered, only two ships were launched, with just one being completed, and neither entered active service before being destroyed.

== Design and description ==
The concept of the class was similar to the British merchant aircraft carrier. The class consisted of two oil tankers of 10,002 gross register tons (GRT) that were modified by the Navy to provide minimal anti-submarine air cover for convoys going from Southeast Asia to the Japanese homeland. The conversion consisted of fitting a full-length flight deck, a small hangar, and a single elevator. An island and catapults were not installed. The only other change was the rerouting of the boiler uptakes to the aft starboard side where they discharged in a typical downward-facing funnel.

The ships had a length of 160.5 meters (526 ft 7 in) overall and 150 meters (492 ft 2 in) between perpendiculars. They had a beam of 20 meters (65 ft 7 in) at the waterline and a mean draft of 9.1 meters (29 ft 10 in). They displaced 11,989 metric tons (11,800 long tons) at standard load.

The Shimane Maru-class ships were fitted with a single geared steam turbine set with a total of 8,600 shaft horsepower (6,400 kW). It drove one propeller shaft using steam provided by two boilers. The ships had a designed speed of 18.5 knots (34.3 km/h; 21.3 mph) and a range of 10,000 nautical miles (19,000 km; 12,000 mi) at 10 knots (19 km/h; 12 mph).

The flight deck was 154.99 meters (508 ft 6 in) long and had a maximum width of 23.01 meters (75 ft 6 in). The hangar, built on top of the well deck, was served by a single elevator from the flight deck. It had a capacity of a dozen aircraft.

== Ships ==
Ship	Builder	Laid down	Launched	Commissioned	Fate
Shimane Maru (しまね丸)	Kawasaki Heavy Industries Shipyard, Kobe	8 June 1944	17 December 1944	28 February 1945	Sunk 24 July 1945 by British aircraft at Shido Bay, Kagawa Prefecture at position 34°20′10″N 134°10′15″E
Ōtakisan Maru (大瀧山丸)	Kawasaki Heavy Industries Shipyard, Kobe	18 September 1944	14 January 1945	Never	Construction was 70 % completed when she drifted onto a mine on 25 August 1945 and sank. Scrapped at Kobe, 1948
Daiju Maru (大邱丸)	Kawasaki Heavy Industries Shipyard, Kobe	18 December 1944	14 January 1945	Never; Stopped in February 1945	Completed and sold to Iino Lines K.K. on 19 October 1949, renamed Ryūhō Maru (隆邦丸). Scrapped at Yokosuka, May 1964
Taisha Maru (大社丸)	-	Never	Never	Never	Cancelled in 1944

== Photo ==
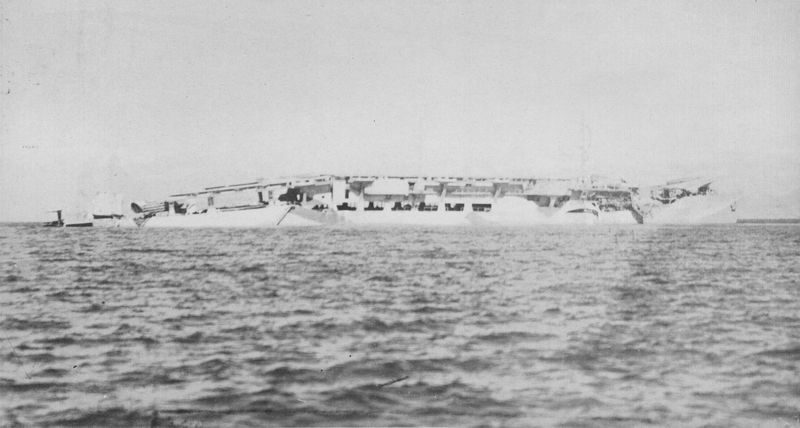
Shimane Maru in postwar

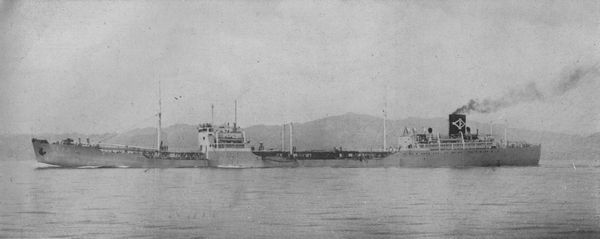
3rd sister Ryūhō Maru (ex.-Daiju Maru) in postwar

== Bibliography ==
- Chesneau, Roger (1995). Aircraft Carriers of the World, 1914 to the Present: An Illustrated Encyclopedia (New, revised ed.). Annapolis, Maryland: Naval Institute Press. ISBN 0-87021-902-2.
- Fukui, Shizuo (1991). Japanese Naval Vessels at the End of World War II. London: Greenhill Books. ISBN 1-85367-125-8.
- Jentschura, Hansgeorg; Jung, Dieter & Mickel, Peter (1977). Warships of the Imperial Japanese Navy, 1869–1945. Annapolis, Maryland: United States Naval Institute. ISBN 0-87021-893-X.
- Lengerer, Hans (2023). The Aircraft Carriers of the Imperial Japanese Navy and Army: Technical and Operational History. Vol. II. Katowice, Poland: Model Hobby. ISBN 978-83-60041-71-0.
- Polmar, Norman; Genda, Minoru (2006). Aircraft Carriers: A History of Carrier Aviation and Its Influence on World Events. Vol. 1, 1909–1945. Washington, D.C.: Potomac Books. ISBN 1-57488-663-0.
- Sturton, Ian (1980). "Japan". In Chesneau, Roger (ed.). Conway's All the World's Fighting Ships 1922–1946. Greenwich, UK: Conway Maritime Press. pp. 167–217. ISBN 0-85177-146-7.
- The Maru Special, Japanese Naval Vessels No. 38, Japanese aircraft carriers II, Ushio Shobō (Japan)
