= Fighter catapult ship =

Type of Royal Navy warship

Fighter catapult ships (FCS) also known as Catapult Armed Ships were an attempt by the Royal Navy to provide air cover at sea. Five ships were acquired and commissioned as Naval vessels early in the Second World War, and these were used to accompany convoys. The concept was extended to merchant ships which were also equipped with rocket-assisted launch systems and known as Catapult Aircraft Merchantmen (CAM ships). Both classes could launch a disposable fighter (usually a Hawker Hurricane) to fight off a threat, with the pilot expected to be rescued after either ditching the aircraft or bailing out close to the launching ship.

== The ships ==
There were five fighter catapult ships, collectively known as the Pegasus class. Two, Patia and Springbank, were lost during the war. They were each equipped with a Fulmar or "Hurricat" (an adapted Hurriane Mk.1A).

Ship	Launched	Converted	Notes
Ariguani	1925	1940	Former ocean boarding vessel, converted to a catapult ship in 1940, war service in the Atlantic After repairs in 1943, returned to merchant use.
Maplin		1940	Former ocean boarding vessel. Maplin saw war service in the Atlantic in 1940. She was a training ship from 1941 to 1944, in reserve from September 1944 and subsequently an accommodation ship. Maplin's war service was on Atlantic convoys and her "Hurricat" was the first to destroy a Luftwaffe aircraft, a Focke-Wulf Fw 200 in August 1941. The pilot was Robert Everett of 804 NAS.
Patia	1922	1941	Former ocean boarding vessel. Lost 1941 Foundered after bombing attack
Pegasus	1914	1940	Commissioned as seaplane carrier HMS Ark Royal in 1914, renamed Pegasus in 1934. Used as seaplane training vessel until converted, returned to training in 1941
Springbank	1926	1940	Cargo ship converted to auxiliary anti-aircraft cruiser then to catapult ship. Torpedoed by U-201 on 27 September 1941 and sunk by HMS Jasmine.

== FCS combat launches ==
Date	Ship	Convoy	Pilot	Notes
18 July 1941	HMS Maplin		Lt Robert Everett	Focke-Wulf Condor shot down by ship anti-aircraft guns, as Hurricane was about to attack. Pilot flew to Northern Ireland, landed RAF St Angelo.
3 August 1941	HMS Maplin	OG 17	Lt Robert Everett	Focke-Wulf Fw 200 Condor shot down; pilot recovered by a destroyer

== See also ==
- Aircraft cruiser – Type of warship
- CAM ship – British merchant ships with onboard fighter aircraft
- List of aircraft carriers of World War II
- List of ships of World War II
- Merchant aircraft carrier – British and Dutch civilian limited-purpose aircraft carriers used in WWII
