= List of Hawker Sea Hawk operators =

The following countries and squadrons operated the Hawker Sea Hawk:

== Operators ==
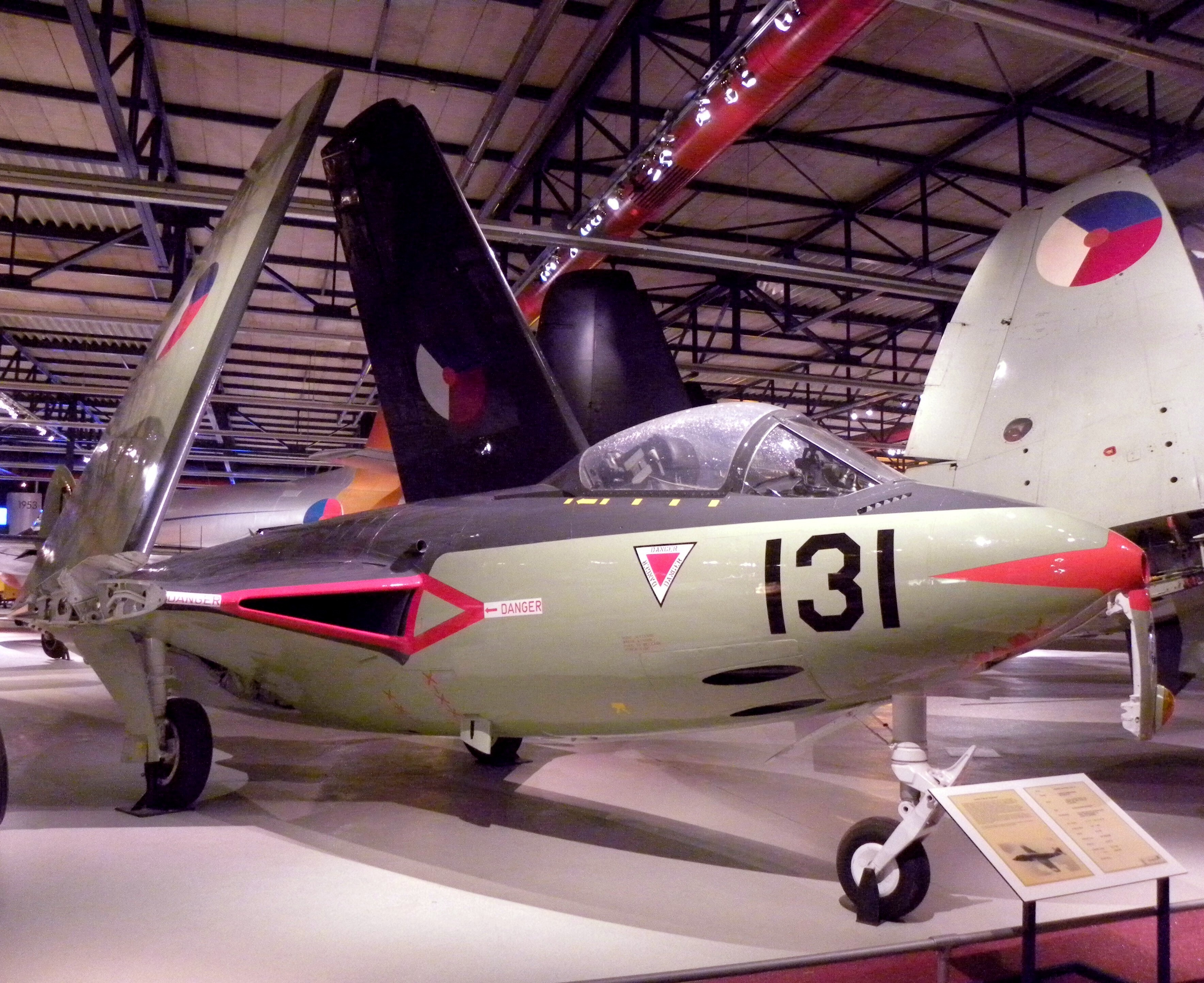
Seen at militare luchtvaart museum Soesterberg

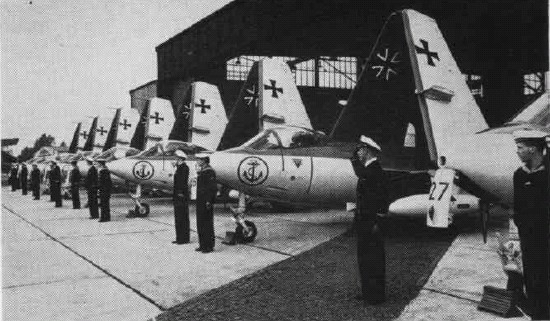
Commissioning of the German Sea Hawks at Jagel 1958

=== West Germany ===
German Navy - Marineflieger

- Marinefliegergeschwader 1
- Marinefliegergeschwader 2

=== India ===
Indian Navy - Indian Naval Air Arm

- 300 Naval Air Squadron
- 551 Naval Air Squadron

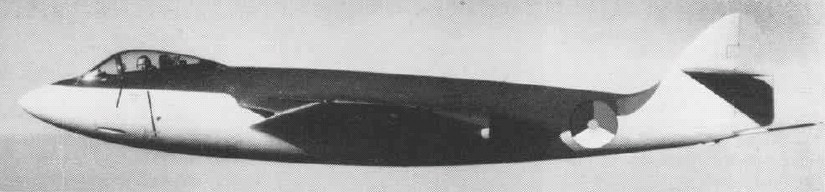
A Dutch Sea Hawk Mk.50

=== Netherlands ===
Royal Netherlands Navy - Dutch Naval Aviation Service

- No. 3 Squadron
- No. 860 Squadron - Mk. 50 (1957-64)

=== United Kingdom ===
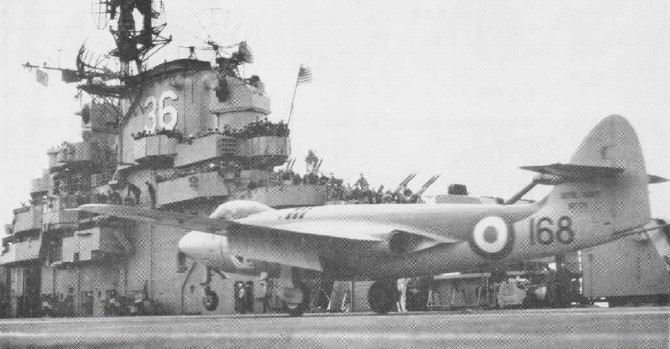
An 803 Sqn. Sea Hawk on the USS Antietam in 1953

Royal Navy - Fleet Air Arm

- 700 Naval Air Squadron - F.1, F.2, FB.3, FGA.4, FB.5 & FGA.6 (1955-59)
- 703 Naval Air Squadron - F.1 & FB.3 (1952-55)
- 736 Naval Air Squadron - F.1, F.2, FB.3, FGA.4, FB.5 & FGA.6 (1954-56 & 57-59)
- 738 Naval Air Squadron - F.1, F.2, FB.3, FGA.4 & FGA.6 (1954-58 & 1960-62)
- 764 Naval Air Squadron - F.1, F.2, FB.3, FGA.4 & FGA.6 (1954-59)
- 767 Naval Air Squadron - F.1, F.2, FB.3 & FGA.4 (1954-55 & 1956-57)
- 781 Naval Air Squadron - FGA.6 (1962-67)
- 787 Naval Air Squadron - F.1, FB.3 & FGA.4 (1953-56)
- 800 Naval Air Squadron - FB.3, FGA.4 & FGA.6 (1954-59)
- 801 Naval Air Squadron - FGA.4 & FGA.6 (1955-56 & 1957-60)
- 802 Naval Air Squadron - F.1, F.2, FB.3, FGA.4 & FB.5 (1954-55 & 1956-59)
- 803 Naval Air Squadron - FB.3 & FGA.6 (1954-55 & 1957-58)
- 804 Naval Air Squadron - F.1, FGA.4 & FGA. 6 (1953-55 & 1956-59)
- 806 Naval Air Squadron - F.1, FB.3, FGA.4, FB.5 & FGA.6 (1953-55 & 1957-60)
- 807 Naval Air Squadron - F.1, F.2, FB.3 & FGA.4 (1954-5)
- 810 Naval Air Squadron - FGA.4 & FGA.6 (1955-56)
- 811 Naval Air Squadron - FB.3 & FGA.4 (1955-56)
- 895 Naval Air Squadron - FB.3, FGA.4 & FGA.6 (1956)
- 897 Naval Air Squadron - FB.3 & FGA.6 (1955-57)
- 898 Naval Air Squadron - F.1, FB.3, FGA.4 & FGA.6 (1953-59)
- 899 Naval Air Squadron - FGA.6 (1955-57)
- 1832 Naval Air Squadron RNVR - F.1 (1956-57)
- Airwork Fleet Requirements Unit - F.1, FB.5 & FGA.6 (1956-69)
- Royal Navy Historic Flight - FGA.6 (1976-?)

== See also ==
- Hawker Sea Hawk
