= 836 Naval Air Squadron =

Inactive flying squadron of the Royal Navy's Fleet Air Arm

- Squadron badge
- Active: 1942-1945
- Disbanded: 29 July 1945
- Country: United Kingdom
- Branch: Royal Navy
- Type: Torpedo Bomber Reconnaissance squadron
- Role: Carrier-based: anti-submarine warfare (ASW); anti-surface warfare (ASuW); Maritime patrol
- Part of: Fleet Air Arm
- Home station: See Naval air stations section for full list.
- Mottos: Mari coeloque (Latin for 'By sea and sky')
- Engagements: World War II: Battle of the Atlantic
- Battle honours: Atlantic 1943-45

Commanders
- Notable commanders: Lieutenant Commander Ransford Slater, OBE, DSC, RN

Insignia
- Squadron Badge Description: Barry wavy of ten white and blue, a winged lion rampant red armed and langued blue (1943)
- Identification Markings: single letters (Swordfish); Flight letter plus individual number (Swordfish October 1943); M1-M4 plus Flight letter (Swordfish October 1944)

Aircraft flown
- Bomber: Fairey Swordfish
- Patrol: Supermarine Walrus

836 Naval Air Squadron (836 NAS), also known as 836 Squadron, is an inactive Fleet Air Arm (FAA) naval air squadron of the United Kingdom's Royal Navy (RN). It was last active during World War II and operated with Fairey Swordfish torpedo bomber between March 1942 and July 1945, mostly as merchant aircraft carrier flights

Established at RNAS Palisadoes (HMS Buzzard), Jamaica, in March 1942, as a torpedo bomber reconnaissance squadron, it was initially under the jurisdiction of RAF Coastal Command at RAF Thorney Island at the end of December. Subsequently, in March 1943, it relocated to RNAS Machrihanish (HMS Landrail), Scotland, transforming into an operational pool of Fairey Swordfish designated for the merchant aircraft carriers, also known as MAC-ships. At one stage, a total of eighty-three aircraft were being utilised from nineteen MAC-ships.

== History ==
=== Formation ===
On 1 February 1942, members of 836 Naval Air Squadron gathered at RNAS Eastleigh (HMS Raven), Hampshire. They departed for Canada aboard the SS Jamaica Producer, then headed for Jamaica aboard the SS Lady Rodney.

The squadron was then officially established at Royal Naval Air Station Palisadoes (HMS Buzzard), at Kingston, Jamaica, on 1 March 1942, under the command of Lieutenant Commander J.A. Crawford, RN. It was designated as a torpedo, bomber, reconnaissance (TBR) squadron and equipped with six Fairey Swordfish I biplane torpedo bombers.

It operated from HMS Buzzard at Palisadoes, Jamaica, in spring 1942, and it subsequently, two months later, they traveled north to the Royal Navy Air Section at Floyd Bennett Field in New York, where the Admiralty had been granted lodger rights for the Royal Navy Air Section and disembarked squadrons. Subsequently, they boarded the Avenger-class escort carrier, HMS Biter, on 2 June 1942 for the UK.

=== RAF Coastal Command ===
The squadron functioned from several Fleet Air Arm bases, predominantly located in Scotland, until it was placed under the jurisdiction of RAF Coastal Command at RAF Thorney Island, West Sussex, on 30 December. On 16 March 1943, after being re-equipped with Fairey Swordfish IIs, it relocated to RNAS Machrihanish (HMS Landrail), Argyll and Bute, transforming into an operational reserve of Fairey Swordfish designated for the merchant aircraft carriers, also known as MAC-ships.

=== Merchant aircraft carriers ===
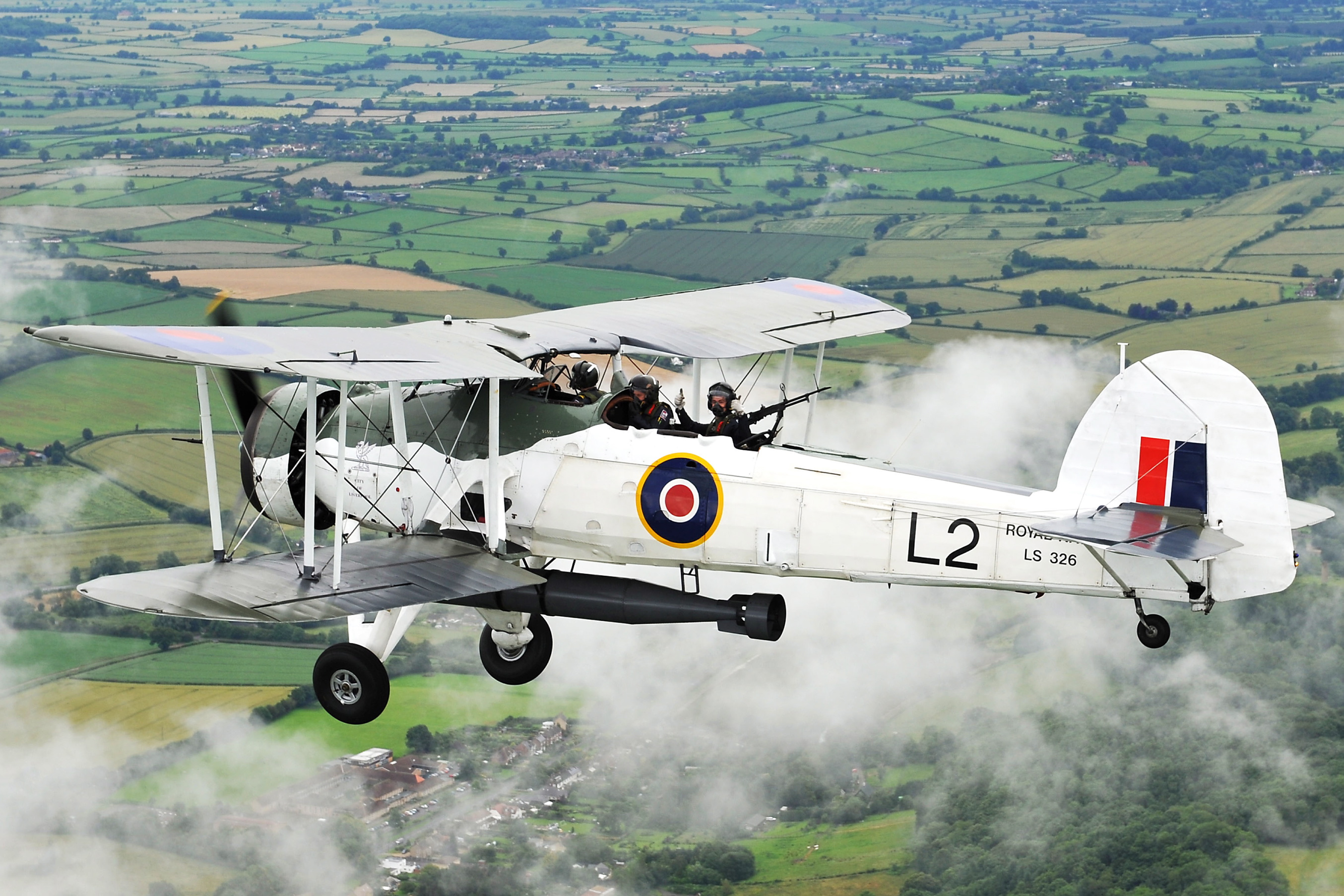
Fairey Swordfish II; an example of the type used by 836 Squadron

The headquarters relocated to RNAS Maydown, County Londonderry, in June. The squadron's operations effectively deterred U-boats and on 13 August, its strength was augmented to twenty-seven Fairey Swordfish and two Supermarine Walrus, an amphibious maritime patrol aircraft by incorporating 840 Squadron along with detachments from 833 and 834 Squadrons, which were then stationed at RNAS Machrihanish. The Supermarine Walrus were quickly phased out, and the squadron assumed primary responsibility for all MAC-Ship Flights, each comprising three Fairey Swordfish for tankers or four Fairey Swordfish for grain vessels, along with an aircrew and seventeen ground personnel.

838 Squadron was integrated as well as 700W Flight. The rest of 833 Squadron was incorporated in January 1944, and in conjunction with 860 Squadron, a total of eighty-three aircraft were being utilised from nineteen MAC-ships. These operations were conducted from RNAS Maydown, RNAS Belfast, and RNAS Machrihanish at the eastern end of the Atlantic route, while RCAF Dartmouth, Nova Scotia, served as the western point.

While stationed in Canada, the squadron also utilised the RCAF airfield at Dartmouth, where a training and replacement Flight was established by October 1943. Additionally, the squadron conducted armament training at RNAS Machrihanish, where a portion of its own aircraft was maintained for this purpose. In mid-1944, some aircraft and crews were temporarily assigned to 816 Squadron at RAF Perranporth, Cornwall, to address a projected rise in U-boat activity in the English Channel during the Normandy invasion, after which 816 Squadron was integrated on 2 August 1944 to create the foundation of 'P' Flight.

=== Lieutenant Commander Slater ===
Acting Lieutenant Commander Ransford Slater took command in July 1942, Slater had personally led the squadron's 'A' flight in the first attachment to MV Empire MacAlpine in April 1943 and he was the only regular Royal Navy officer in the unit, all others being wartime RNVR. Slater had recognised from the outset that successful operations required the aircrew and ship's crew to work together as a team. That was potentially a problem since the Royal Navy and the Merchant Navy had widely differing working practices and traditions.

"During the weeks of training, Slater was in his element. His leadership was evident in every aspect. His skill in unlocking the secrets of how to land on a floating postage-stamp were passed on to his pilots, while, at the same time, he made the team feel that their contribution to the success of the enterprise was vital.."

One thing he arranged was that the air party on the ships signed ships articles and hence placed themselves under the orders of the Ship's Master. For this they were supposed to receive one shilling per month and a bottle of beer per day. They got the beer – seven bottles every Sunday. It also entitled them to wear the small silver 'MN' lapel badge on their uniforms, which caused not a little upset with more traditional senior RN officers. Another of Slater's rules for the squadron was that flight commanders must have completed a full round trip under another flight commander before being eligible to take over.

The squadron operated the Fairey Swordfish Mark II and they were painted all white (apparently the best camouflage for daylight flight over water). Some flights got carried away and replaced the Royal Navy legend on the rear fuselage with Merchant Navy – to the consternation of some observers. With a flight for each of 19 ships, plus a few spare flights for training and relief, the squadron eventually grew to a strength of 91 aircraft, certainly a Fleet Air Arm record and probably a world one. Slater was awarded the military OBE for his efforts, particularly for landing on a MAC ship carrying 2 depth charges after his arrester hook had been torn away. He was killed by flying into powerlines near Derry on 28 June 1944.

=== Disbandment ===
The squadron's capacity diminished as the threat posed by U-boats decreased and the utilisation of escort carriers increased, resulting in a reduction to thirty aircraft by February 1945. Despite enduring long enough for the introduction of Fairey Swordfish IIIs, the squadron was disbanded at RNAS Maydown on 29 July 1945.

The majority of the aircraft were transported to Barton, near Manchester, for dismantling. However, one aircraft that managed to evade this outcome was LS326, previously designated as L2 with L' Flight in MV Rapana, and is currently with the Royal Navy Historic Flight (RNHF) at RNAS Yeovilton, Somerset.

== Aircraft operated ==
The squadron operated a variety of different aircraft and versions:

- Fairey Swordfish I biplane torpedo bomber (March 1942 - March 1943)
- Fairey Swordfish II biplane torpedo bomber (March 1943 - June 1945)
- Supermarine Walrus amphibious maritime patrol aircraft (August - October 1943)
- FaireySwordfish III biplane torpedo bomber (December 1944 - May 1945)

== Battle honours ==
The following Battle Honours have been awarded to 836 Naval Air Squadron:

- Atlantic 1943-45

== Naval air stations and aircraft carriers ==
836 Naval Air Squadron was active at various naval air stations of the Royal Navy and Royal Air Force stations, both within the United Kingdom and internationally. Additionally, it operated from a Royal Navy escort carriers and a number of merchant aircraft carriers, as well as other airbases located abroad.

=== World War Two air stations and aircraft carriers ===
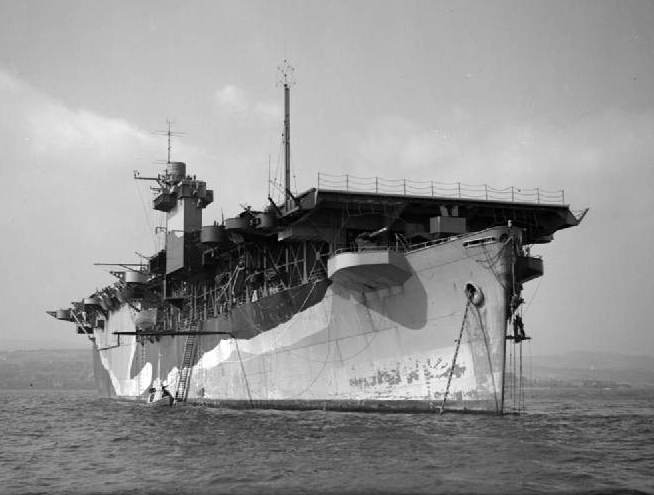
HMS Biter

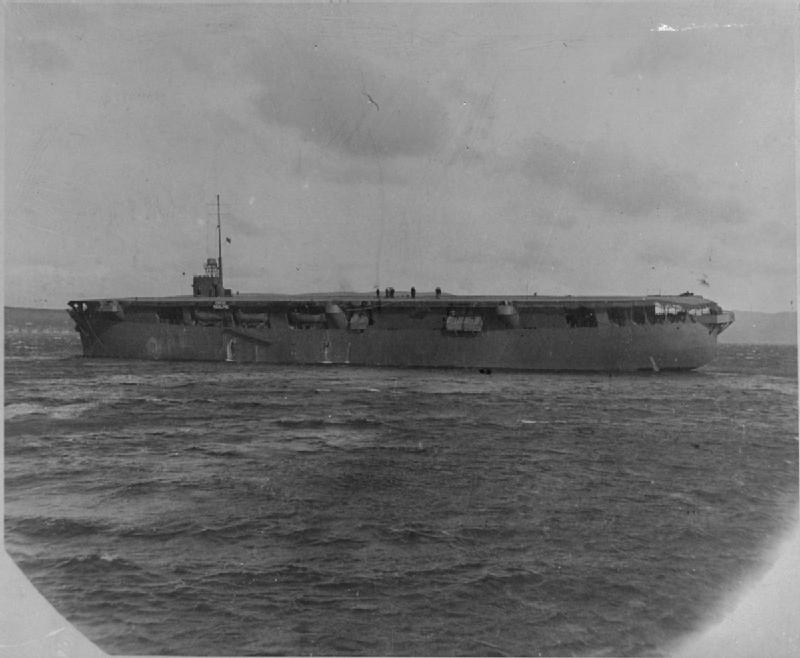
MV Empire MacAlpine

List of air stations and aircraft carriers used by 836 Naval Air Squadron during World War two including dates:

- Royal Naval Air Station Palisadoes (HMS Buzzard), Jamaica, (1 March - 13 May 1942)
- transit - (13 - 18 May 1942)
- RN Air Section Floyd Bennett Field, New York, (18 May - 2 June 1942)
- HMS Biter (2 - 27 June 1942
- Royal Naval Air Station Lee-on-Solent (HMS Daedalus), Hampshire, (27 June - 9 August 1942)
- Royal Naval Air Station Machrihanish (HMS Landrail), Argyll and Bute, (9 August - 24 September 1942)
- Royal Naval Air Station Crail (HMS Jackdaw), Fife, (24 September - 28 October 1942)
- Royal Naval Air Station Machrihanish (HMS Landrail), Argyll and Bute, (28 October - 26 November 1942)
- Royal Naval Air Station St Merryn (HMS Vulture), Cornwall, (26 November - 30 December 1942)
- Royal Air Force Thorney Island, West Sussex, (30 December 1942 - 16 March 1943)
- Royal Naval Air Station Machrihanish (HMS Landrail), West Sussex, (16 - 27 March 1943)
- Royal Naval Air Station Ballykelly, County Londonderry, (27 March - 5 May 1943)
  - Royal Naval Air Station Machrihanish (HMS Landrail), Argyll and Bute, (Detachment 6–14 March 1943)
- Royal Naval Air Station Machrihanish (HMS Landrail), Argyll and Bute, (5 - 14 May 1943)
  - MV Empire MacAlpine (flying trials) (7 - 10 May 1943)
- MV Empire MacAlpine (14 May - 10 June 1943)
- RN Air Section Dartmouth, Nova Scotia, (10 - 19 June 1943)
- MV Empire MacAlpine (19 June - 5 July 1943)
- Royal Naval Air Station Maydown, County Londonderry, (5 - 6 July 1943)
- Royal Naval Air Station Belfast (HMS Gadwall), County Antrim, (6 July 1943)
- Royal Naval Air Station Maydown, County Londonderry, (18 July 1943 - 29 July 1945)
- operated as Flights 1943-45
  - RN Air Section Dartmouth, Nova Scotia, (Detachment six aircraft October 1943 - May 1945)
  - Royal Naval Air Station Machrihanish (HMS Landrail), Argyll and Bute, (Detachment armament courses 1943–45)
  - Royal Naval Air Station Arbroath (HMS Condor), Angus, (Detachment ASV courses 1944–45)
- disbanded - (29 July 1945)

== Commanding officers ==
List of commanding officers of 836 Naval Air Squadron:

- Lieutenant Commander J.A. Crawford, RN, from 1 March 1942
- Lieutenant R.W. Slater, DSC, RN, from 9 July 1942 (Lieutenant Commander, OBE, 1 November 1942, KiFA 28 June 1944)
- Lieutenant Commander J.R.C. Callendar, RN, from 29June 1944
- Lieutenant Commander(A) F.G.B. Sheffield, DSC, RNVR, from 5 March 1945
- disbanded - 29 July 1945

Note: Abbreviation (A) signifies Air Branch of the RN or RNVR.

== See also ==
- List of Fleet Air Arm aircraft squadrons
