= MV Rapana =

Oil tanker converted to aircraft carrier during WW2

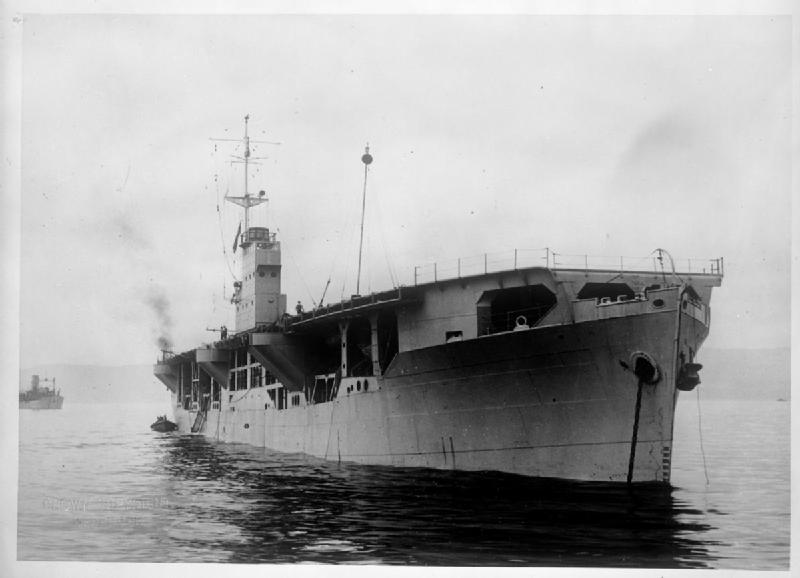
- MV Rapana.

History

United Kingdom
- Name: Rapana (1935–50); Rotula (1950–58)
- Owner: Anglo Saxon Royal Dutch/Shell
- Operator: Anglo Saxon Royal Dutch/Shell
- Builder: Wilton-Fijenoord, Schiedam, Netherlands
- Launched: March 1935
- Honours and awards: Atlantic 1944–1945
- Fate: Scrapped at Osaka in 1958

General characteristics
- Tonnage: 8,000 GRT
- Length: 463 ft (141 m) (between perpendiculars); 482 ft (147 m) (overall)
- Beam: 59 ft (18 m)
- Draught: 27 ft 6 in (8.38 m)
- Propulsion: Sulzer Diesel; One shaft; 4,000 bhp
- Speed: 12.5 knots (23.2 km/h)
- Complement: 118
- Armament: 1 × 4 in (100 mm); 6 × Single Oerlikon 20 mm; 2 x Single Bofors 40 mm
- Aircraft carried: Three Fairey Swordfish

MV Rapana was a Dutch-built oil tanker converted to a Merchant Aircraft Carrier (MAC ship) during World War II. She was the first tanker to be converted to a MAC ship, and was the lead ship of her class of conversions. Rapana was launched as a tanker in April 1935, and served as a merchant vessel until July 1943, when she was converted into a MAC ship. After World War II, the ship was converted back into a tanker and returned to civilian service. In 1950 she was sold and renamed Rotula. She was scrapped in Osaka in January 1958.

== Design and description ==
MV Rapana was built as a “Triple Twelve” oil tanker, with an overall length of 482 feet (146.9 m), a beam of 59 feet (18.0 m), and a draft of 27 feet 6 inches (8.4 m). She had a gross registered tonnage of 8000 tons, and 16000 tons under full load. Her Sulzer diesel engine provided 4000 bhp driving a single shaft, giving her a maximum speed of 12.5kts.

After her conversion, Rapana had a 462 feet (140.8 m) long and 62 feet (18.9 m) wide flight deck. Due to being converted from a tanker, she did not have a hangar and all aircraft were parked on deck. A safety barrier and windbreak were installed on the flight deck to allow for this. These modifications gave her the capacity to operate 3 Swordfish torpedo bombers in anti-submarine duties. A small island was installed on her starboard side, including the bridge, wheelhouse, and flying control position. Her armament included a single 4 inch (102 mm) QF MK IV, as well as 2 single 40mm Bofors guns and 6 single Oerlikon 20 mm cannons.

Because the ship was still considered a merchant vessel, her crew of 118 was a mix of merchantmen as well as Royal Navy men, with the latter taking care of aircraft maintenance and operations.

== Service history ==
MV Rapana was initially built at Wilton-Fijenoord, Schiedam, Netherlands, and was launched in March 1935, with work completed a month later in April 1935. She was initially owned and operated by N.V. Petroleum Maats. ‘La Corona’. In 1939, the ship was purchased by the Anglo-Saxon Petroleum Company and operated as a merchant ship until 1943, when she was converted into a MAC ship - the first of the MAC tanker ships.

Work to convert Rapana to a MAC Ship would be undertaken by Smith's Dock Company, and would be completed in July 1943. After conversion, she would work up for convoy service in the North Atlantic in July 1943. The ship would embark 836L Flight of 836 NAS in August 1943. In October 1943, Rapana sailed in convoy SC 143. During the convoy, her Swordfish attacked a U-boat shadowing the convoy, though the effectiveness of the attack was inconclusive. In February 1944, she disembarked 836L. 836 X Flight would embark in April 1944. This flight would disembark at RNAS Maydown in October 1944, and the ship would spend the rest of the conflict without aircraft.

Following the end of the war in 1945, MV Rapana was converted back into a tanker. She operated under the Anglo Saxon Petroleum Company until 1950, when the ship was sold back to La Corona and renamed Rotula. She operated under this name until January 1958, when the ship was broken up in Osaka by Hanwa Kogyo K.K.

== Notable aircraft ==
Swordfish LS326 served aboard her during the war before its transfer to MV Empire MacCallum. From 1960 until its disbandment in March 2019, it was part of the Royal Navy Historic Flight. As of 2024, it is airworthy with the Fly Navy Heritage Trust.
