= List of ships named Parnon =

Several ships have been named Parnon, after the Greek mountain range, including:

- MV Parnon (1940), a 724 GRT Greek cargo vessel, converted from the corvette HMS Alisma. She foundered off Italy on 16 July 1954
- MV Parnon (1944), a 7,952 GRT Greek bulk carrier, built as the merchant aircraft carrier Empire MacDermott
