= MacKendrick =

Mackendrick is a surname. Notable people with the surname include:

- Alexander Mackendrick (1912–1993), Scottish American director and teacher
- Paul MacKendrick (1914–1998), American classicist, author and teacher

== See also ==
- MV Empire MacKendrick, grain ship converted to become a Merchant Aircraft Carrier or MAC ship
