= 840 Naval Air Squadron =

Inactive flying squadron of the Royal Navy's Fleet Air Arm

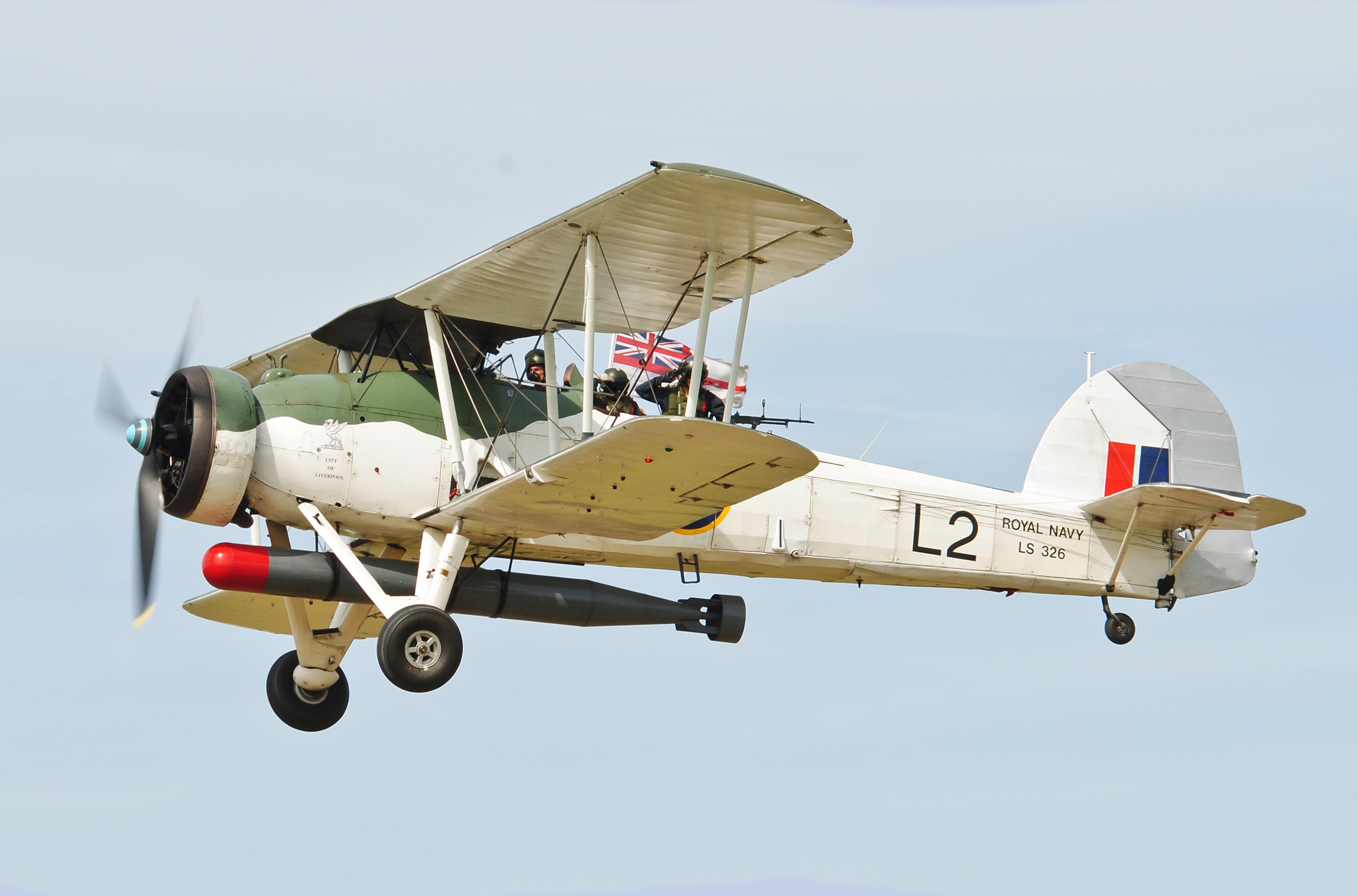
- Fairey Swordfish; an example of the type used by 840 NAS
- Active: 1942–1943
- Disbanded: 13 August 1943
- Country: United Kingdom
- Branch: Royal Navy
- Type: Torpedo Bomber Reconnaissance squadron
- Role: Carrier-based: anti-submarine warfare (ASW); anti-surface warfare (ASuW); Maritime patrol
- Part of: Fleet Air Arm
- Home station: See Naval air stations section for full list.
- Engagements: World War II: Battle of the Atlantic
- Battle honours: Atlantic 1943

Insignia
- Identification Markings: Single letters

Aircraft flown
- Bomber: Fairey Swordfish

840 Naval Air Squadron (840 NAS), also referred to as 840 Squadron, was a Naval Air Squadron of the Royal Navy's Fleet Air Arm. It was last operational during World War II, operating with Fairey Swordfish.

After gathering in HMS Raven, RNAS Eastleigh, Hampshire, a month earlier, the squadron was established in Jamaica, at HMS Buzzard, RNAS Palisadoes, in June 1942, as a TBR squadron before relocating to Miami in September. They joined HMS Battler in December and landed at HMS Asbury, RNAS Quonset Point. Subsequently, the squadron boarded HMS Attacker to provide anti-submarine support for a convoy heading to the UK, disembarking at HMS Landrail, RNAS Machrihanish in April 1943. In May 1943, the squadron took on MAC-ship duties, initially serving on the MV Empire MacAndrew starting in July, but was disbanded in August 13, to become 'M' Flight of 836 Naval Air Squadron.

== History ==
=== Torpedo, bomber, reconnaissance squadron (1942-1943) ===
On 4 May 1942, the nucleus of 840 Naval Air Squadron gathered at RNAS Eastleigh (HMS Raven) in Hampshire to prepare for their journey to Kingston, Jamaica. The squadron was set to officially establish itself at RNAS Palisadoes (HMS Buzzard) in Kingston, on 1 June, functioning as a torpedo bomber reconnaissance unit under the command of Lieutenant(A) L.R. Tivy, RN.

Two pilots and three observers reported to RNAS Palisadoes, where they were assigned four Fairey Swordfish I biplane torpedo bombers, marking the commencement of the squadron's training. Additional personnel joined shortly thereafter, and in September, the squadron was equipped with four Fairey Swordfish II aircraft. On the 25, the squadron relocated to US NAS Miami to further their training before boarding the Attacker-class escort carrier, HMS Battler, on 12 December.

On 26 December, the squadron disembarked and flew to RNAS Quonset Point (HMS Asbury), Rhode Island, previously known as USNAS Quonset Point, which had been temporarily assigned to the Admiralty since October. On 2 March 1943, the squadron departed to rendezvous with the name ship of her class, the escort carrier, HMS Attacker, for their journey back to the United Kingdom, to provide anti-submarine cover for the convoy. HMS Attacker arrived in the Clyde on 1 April and departed for Liverpool the next day. 840 Naval Air Squadron disembarked and flew to RNAS Machrihanish (HMS Landrail) in Argyll and Bute.

On 21 April, a new commanding officer, Lieutenant (A) C.M.T. Hallewell, RN, took charge, while at RNAS Machrihanish, coinciding with the re-assignment of 840 Naval Air Squadron for Merchant aircraft carrier (MAC-ship) operations. The squadron relocated to RNAS Maydown, County Londonderry in Northern Ireland on 27 June, which was designated as the primary base for all MAC-ship aircraft. Subsequently, the squadron was assigned to MV Empire MacAndrew, with embarkation occurring on 12 July.

A policy shift led to the centralisation of the MAC-Ship task, resulting in 840 Naval Air Squadron being re-designated as 'M' Flight of 836 Naval Air Squadron, shortly after its embarkation on 13 August.

== Aircraft flown ==
840 Naval Air Squadron flew two variants of only one aircraft type:

- Fairey Swordfish I torpedo bomber (June 1942 - March 1943)
- Fairey Swordfish II torpedo bomber (September 1942 - August 1943)

== Battle honours ==
The Battle Honours awarded to 840 Naval Air Squadron are:

- Atlantic 1943

== Naval air stations ==
840 Naval Air Squadron operated mostly from a number of naval air stations of the Royal Navy in the UK and overseas, a couple of Royal Navy escort carriers and a merchant aircraft carrier:

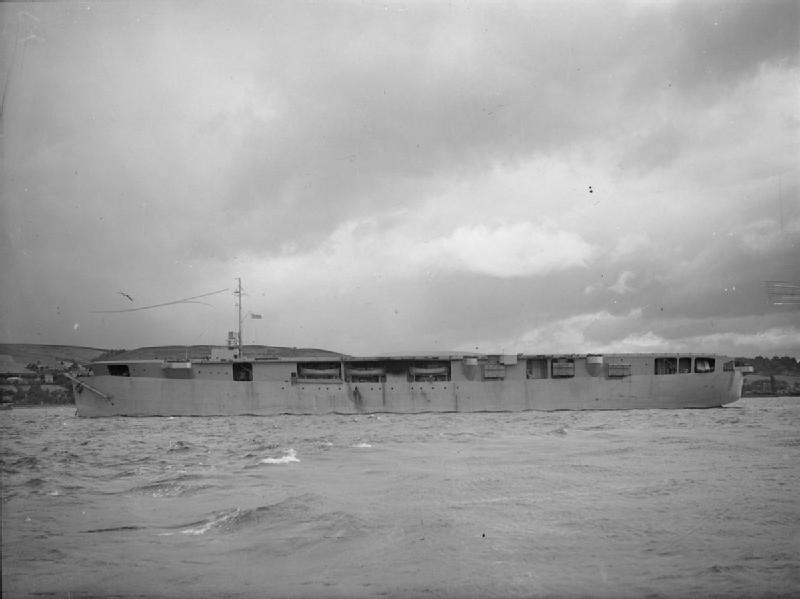
MV Empire MacAndrew

- Royal Naval Air Station Palisadoes (HMS Buzzard), Jamaica, (1 June - 25 September 1942)
- Naval Air Station Miami, Florida, (25 September - 12 December 1942)
- HMS Battler (12 - 26 December 1942)
- Royal Naval Air Station Quonset Point (HMS Asbury), Rhode Island, (26 December - 2 March 1942)
- Royal Naval Air Station Machrihanish (HMS Landrail), Argyll and Bute, (2 April - 3 May 1943)
- Royal Naval Air Station Hatston (HMS Sparrowhawk), Mainland, Orkney, (3 May - 8 June 1943)
- HMS Activity (Deck Landing Training (DLT) 25–28 May 1943)
- Royal Naval Air Station Machrihanish (HMS Landrail), Argyll and Bute, (8 - 27 June 1943)
- Royal Naval Air Station Maydown, County Londonderry, (27 June - 12 July 1943)
- MV Empire MacAndrew (12 July - 13 August 1943)
- became 836 Naval Air Squadron 'M' Flight - (13 August 1943)

== Commanding officers ==
List of commanding officers of 840 Naval Air Squadron with date of appointment:

- Lieutenant(A) L.R. Tivy, RN, from 1 June 1942
- Lieutenant(A) C.M.T. Hallewell, RN, from 21 April 1943
- disbanded - 13 August 43

Note: Abbreviation (A) signifies Air Branch of the RN or RNVR.
