= MV Alexia =

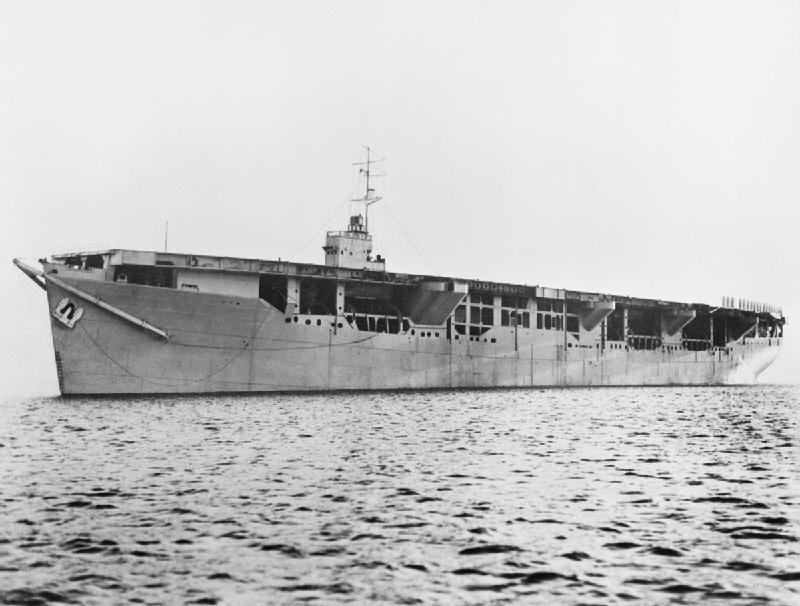
- MV Alexia.

History

United Kingdom
- Name: MV Alexia
- Operator: Royal Dutch/Shell
- Builder: Bremer Vulkan
- Launched: 20 December 1934
- Renamed: Ianthina
- Honours and awards: Atlantic
- Fate: Scrapped Blyth 1954

General characteristics
- Tonnage: 8,016 GRT
- Length: 463 ft (141 m) (pp) 481 ft (147 m) (oa)
- Beam: 59 ft (18 m)
- Draught: 27 ft 6 in (8.38 m)
- Propulsion: Diesel; one shaft; 4,000bhp
- Speed: 13 knots (24 km/h)
- Complement: 100
- Armament: 1 × 4 in (100 mm); 8 × 20 mm
- Aircraft carried: Four Fairey Swordfish

MV Alexia was one of nine Royal Dutch/Shell oil tankers converted to become a Merchant Aircraft Carrier (MAC ship). The group is collectively known as the Rapana class.

MV Alexia was built at Bremer Vulkan and completed in April, 1935 as an oil tanker for the Anglo-Dutch Royal Dutch/Shell line. She sustained severe damage in two separate U-boat attacks in 1940 and 1942.

After the second attack was converted to a MAC ship, entering service in December 1943.

As a MAC ship, she had no aircraft hangar, and continued to carry normal cargoes, although operating under Royal Navy control. Only her air crew and the necessary maintenance staff were naval personnel.

At the end of the war, Alexia was reconverted to an oil tanker, and renamed Ianthina in 1951. She served in this capacity until broken up for scrap at Blyth in 1954.
