= MV Empire MacMahon =

World War II merchant ship of the United Kingdom

History

United Kingdom
- Name: Empire MacMahon
- Owner: Ministry of War Transport
- Operator: Anglo-Saxon Petroleum Co.
- Builder: Swan Hunter & Wigham Richardson, Wallsend
- Launched: 2 July 1943
- Renamed: Naninia in 1946
- Fate: Scrapped Hong Kong 1960

General characteristics
- Tonnage: 8,908 GRT
- Length: 463 ft (141 m) (pp) 485 ft 9 in (148.06 m) (oa)
- Beam: 61 ft 9 in (18.82 m)
- Depth: 27 ft 6 in (8.38 m)
- Propulsion: Diesel; one shaft; 3,300 bhp
- Speed: 11 knots (20 km/h)
- Complement: 110
- Armament: 1 × 4 in (100 mm); 8 × 20 mm
- Aircraft carried: Four Fairey Swordfish

MV Empire MacMahon was an oil tanker converted to a merchant aircraft carrier or MAC ship.

MV Empire MacMahon was built by Swan Hunter, Wallsend under order from the Ministry of War Transport. She entered service as a MAC ship in December 1943; however, only her air crew and the necessary maintenance staff were naval personnel. She was operated by Anglo-Saxon Petroleum Co.

She returned to merchant service as an oil tanker in 1946 and renamed Naninia and was eventually scrapped in Hong Kong in 1960.
