= Merchant aircraft carrier =

British and Dutch civilian limited-purpose aircraft carriers used in WWII

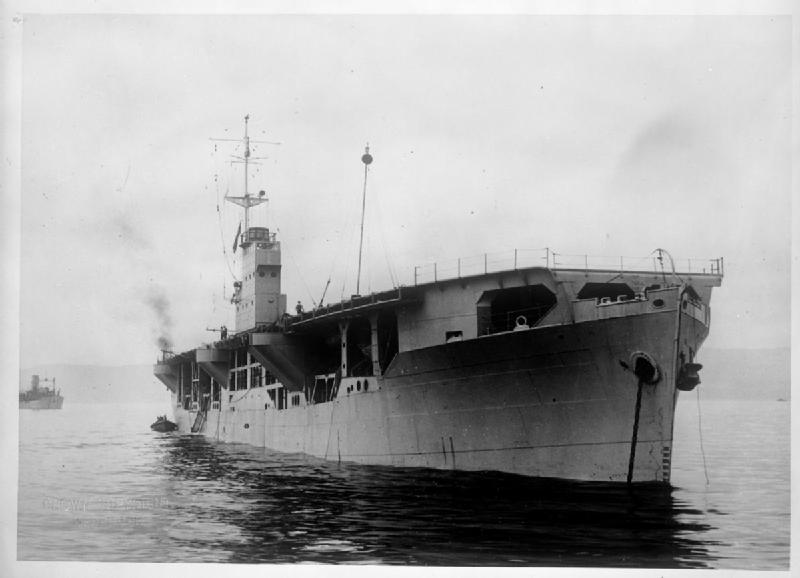
MV Rapana, an oil tanker converted into a merchant aircraft carrier (MAC). MACs were introduced to provide air cover for convoys until sufficient escort carriers became available to replace them.

A merchant aircraft carrier (also known as a MAC ship, the Admiralty's official 'short name') was a limited-purpose aircraft carrier operated under British and Dutch civilian registry during World War II. MAC ships were adapted by adding a flight deck to a bulk grain ship or oil tanker enabling it to operate anti-submarine aircraft in support of Allied convoys during the Battle of the Atlantic.

Despite their quasi-military function, MAC ships retained their mercantile status, continued to carry cargo and operated under civilian command. MAC ships entered service from May 1943 when they began to supplement and supplant escort carriers, and remained operational until the end of the war in Europe.

== Development ==
In 1940, Captain M. S. Slattery RN, Director of Air Matériel at the Admiralty, proposed a scheme for converting merchant ships into aircraft carriers as a follow-up to the CAM ship project. Slattery proposed fitting a flight deck equipped with two arrestor wires and a safety barrier onto an existing merchant ship hull. The resulting 'auxiliary fighter carrier' would be capable of operating six Hurricane fighters while retaining its cargo-carrying ability. The stumbling block for Slattery's proposal turned out to be objections from the Ministry of Supply that combining the merchant and aircraft carrier roles would be too complicated. While this would turn out to be over-stated, it seems to have had the effect of diverting attention from the idea of hybrid merchant-warships towards the alternative of converting merchant ships into fully-fledged warships designated 'auxiliary aircraft carriers', the first of which, converted from the captured German cargo ship Hannover, entered service as Empire Audacity (later HMS Audacity) in June 1941.

The hybrid concept re-emerged early in 1942 when, in the face of mounting losses from U-boat attacks, it became apparent that escort carriers being built in the US could not be delivered quickly enough in the numbers required. Various people have been credited with re-inventing the idea, including Captain B. B. Schofield RN, Director Trade Division, and John Lamb, Marine Technical Manager of Anglo-Saxon Petroleum. Sir James Lithgow, Controller of Merchant Shipbuilding and Repair and joint-owner of Lithgows Ltd, the Clyde-based shipbuilders, also helped overcome Admiralty reservations about MAC ships. Lithgow is said to have sketched a rough design for one on the back of an envelope and offered to convert two ships about to be built at his family's shipyard on condition that "I am not interfered with by the Admiralty". While the timing of Lithgow's possibly apocryphal intervention is uncertain, his deputy, Sir Amos Ayre, the Director of Merchant Shipbuilding, was certainly discussing the requirements for MAC ships by May 1942. Ayre himself credits Sir Douglas Thomson of Ben Line and the Ministry of War Transport with having first suggested the idea.

There was some initial resistance to the MAC ship concept, in particular through concerns about operating aircraft from short, relatively slow ships. The Admiralty considered that a flight deck length of 460 feet (140 m) was needed for safe take-offs and landings and a speed of 15 knots (28 km/h; 17 mph). to provide a sufficient margin over convoy speeds and they were especially doubtful that tankers, with their low freeboards and volatile cargoes, could be utilised. As the U-boat situation worsened, however, such concerns were out-weighed by the urgent need to provide convoy air support, and once it was accepted that the grain ship variant at least could be made to work, the Admiralty became more enthusiastic about the project.

By September 1942, the Admiralty was asking for "about 50" MAC ships to be made available, to allow one to be included in every North Atlantic convoy and in October the requirement was set at 52. This ambitious target had been scaled back to 40 by the time the MAC ship project was formally endorsed by the War Cabinet in October 1942, but it was apparent that even this reduced number could not be produced sufficiently quickly without American help. The US was therefore asked to begin construction of 30 MAC ships to be delivered during the first half of 1943, but a Navy Department committee specially formed to consider the request turned it down because of concerns about the experimental nature of the ships. In the event, all the MAC ships were built and/or converted in British shipyards.

== Conversion programme ==
The first two MAC ships were ordered in June 1942 from the Burntisland Shipbuilding Company on the Firth of Forth and William Denny & Brothers of Dumbarton. These ships, which were not strictly conversions but brand-new grain ships that had not yet been laid down, would eventually enter service as Empire MacAlpine and Empire MacAndrew respectively. Empire MacAlpine was launched on 23 December 1942 and completed more-or-less on schedule on 21 April 1943. Five more new-build grain ships, Empire MacAndrew, Empire MacRae, Empire MacCallum, Empire MacKendrick and Empire MacDermott followed at approximately two-month intervals, with Empire MacDermott entering service in March 1944.

By late September 1942 it was finally agreed that tanker-MAC ships could be operated safely subject to various limitations about the cargoes they would be allowed to carry. Four new-build tankers were scheduled for conversion but work on these did not start until May 1943. Empire MacKay entered service in October 1943, followed at intervals by Empire MacCabe, Empire MacMahon and Empire MacColl in November 1943. Additional hulls were still needed, however, and it was decided that existing tankers would have to be withdrawn from trade. The most efficient way to approach the task of converting these was to select ships of similar design and, at the beginning of 1943, Anglo-Saxon Petroleum, which had actively promoted the MAC ship concept, offered up its entire fleet of British-registered 'Triple Twelve' tankers (sometimes referred to as the Rapana class) for government charter.

The desirability of converting foreign-owned tankers was also considered and in January 1943 the Ministry of War Transport asked the Norwegian government-in-exile if the modern Norwegian tanker B.P. Newton could be converted to a MAC ship under British command. The initial response was not helpful with Norway insisting on financial arrangements that War Transport officials described as "wholly unreasonable as between allies", but although these were later ameliorated, the proposal eventually foundered because the design effort was judged too much for what would have been a one-off conversion. At about the same time however, a further three tankers of the same class as the Anglo-Saxon 'Triple Twelves' were identified operating under Dutch registry (Anglo-Saxon Petroleum was a subsidiary of Shell). The Netherlands authorities approved the British request but on condition that the ships, as MAC ships, would fly the Dutch flag and be under Dutch civilian command to which the Admiralty, citing potential language difficulties, only reluctantly agreed. In the event, only two of the Dutch ships were taken up as MAC ships but these, Gadila and Macoma, crewed entirely by Dutch merchant seamen and with aircraft flights drawn from the Royal Netherlands Navy-manned 860 Naval Air Squadron would have the distinction of becoming the Netherlands' first aircraft carriers.

== Civilian status ==
Despite their military appearance and combatant function, MAC ships were civilian ships that did not appear in the Navy List nor were they commanded by commissioned officers: this unusual status is one of their defining characteristics. The hybrid nature of the MAC ships raised from the outset the question of whether they would be commissioned warships like the new escort carriers, or if they would operate as merchant ships under the Red Ensign like the earlier CAM ships. The Admiralty's preference was to operate them as regular warships but it soon became clear that there were not enough personnel available to man them to naval standards without causing serious shortfalls in other areas, in particular the large numbers of escort carriers that would soon arrive. The Admiralty and Ministry of War Transport therefore agreed that the MAC ships would be civilian-manned. Serious reservations about the proposed civilian status were raised, however, by Foreign Office officials, who were concerned that the ships would be de facto warships under international law but, without the protection afforded by the 1907 Hague Convention which applied only to members of the armed forces, their civilian crews would be liable to be treated as unlawful combatants, or francs-tireurs. The potential for such action had been clearly demonstrated by the execution in 1916 of Captain Charles Fryatt, for attempting to ram a U-boat with his cross-Channel ferry. The risk to MAC ship crews was considered so great that it was explicitly put before the War Cabinet:

The greater the effect of air action on the U-boat campaign, the more the enemy may be tempted to try to damage the morale of M.A.C. crews by court martialling and shooting any Merchant Service personnel they may capture from such ships.

The War Cabinet ordered a review of the situation but the manning difficulties could not be resolved. The Foreign Office reluctantly agreed that the MAC ships would have to operate under the Red Ensign, provided that the merchant seamen and their unions were made aware of the risks involved, and that every possible precaution would be taken to ensure that the men did not fall into enemy hands. In the event, there is little to suggest that the MAC ships' crews were ever formally notified that they might be at special risk. There is evidence, however, that the authorities remained sensitive about the status of MAC ships which were specifically excluded from the publicity that was arranged for other 'special service' merchant ships, e.g. rescue ships. As late as September 1944, masters were reminded to point out to their crews the need to maintain secrecy about the MAC ships' operations and functions.

== Ship details ==
The new-build grain carrier MAC ships were based on the Ministry of War Transport's standard tramp hull which could just accommodate the Admiralty's revised requirement for a flight deck of not less than 390 feet (120 m) length and 62 ft (19 m) breadth. They were eventually built with flight decks of between 413 and 424 ft (126 and 129 m). The standard design used for the new-build tankers enabled a longer flight deck of approximately 460 ft (140 m) with minor variations between individual ships. An important enhancement was specified for the MAC ships' machinery. A standard diesel tramp engine developed 2,500 bhp (1,900 kW) to give a service speed of 11 knots (20 km/h; 13 mph). but to provide some margin for flying operations, all the new-build MAC ships were fitted with engines rated at 3,300 bhp (2,500 kW) which, in the grain ships, produced a speed of about 12 knots (22 km/h; 14 mph). The new-build tankers with their higher displacements were still capable of 11 knots. as were the pre-existing 'Triple Twelves'. The most obvious modification was the flight deck and its supporting structure which was arranged in sections (three on the grain ships; four in the case of tankers) with expansion joints between each. The flight deck was built at the level that would normally have been occupied by the wheelhouse and in the 'Triple Twelves' this entailed removal of the existing wheelhouse and the funnel. The space immediately under the flight deck was utilised for the arrester gear mechanisms, four wires to each MAC ship with an additional unit fitted to the tankers to operate the trickle wire and safety barrier. A small island structure contained the bridge and wheelhouse and, in the tanker MAC ships, a chartroom that could be used as a pilots' briefing room. Less apparent modifications included; accommodation for 107 crew (about 50 more than normal); improved internal subdivision; additional ventilation, including exhaust arrangements that could be adjusted to vent to the leeward side; changes to lifeboat positions; and magazines for the safe stowage of bombs, depth charges, ammunition and pyrotechnics. There were minor variations between the types. In the grain MAC ships, the armament sponsons or 'zarebas' could not project outboard of the moulded line of the hull which necessitated them encroaching onto the flight deck area so that the ship would not be prevented from using commercial berths, but this constraint did not apply to the tankers whose zarebas were extended outboard of the side. One centre cargo tank in each tanker was adapted for the carriage of aircraft fuel (or 'Avgas') but in the grain ships this necessitated a special compartment containing two pressurised fuel tanks, together with a control room and associated piping.

The most significant difference between the grain ship and tanker MAC ships was the provision of hangar space within the grain ships. The three after holds were converted to provide a hangar 142 ft (43 m) long, 38 ft (12 m) wide to a height of 24 ft (7.3 m) in which the ship's full complement of four Fairey Swordfish biplane aircraft could be stowed with wings folded. An elevator platform could lift a fully loaded aircraft from hangar to deck level in less than a minute. It was impracticable to fit tanker MAC ships with a hangar as this would have entailed very extensive structural alterations and a significant reduction in cargo capacity. Although capable of operating four aircraft, tanker MAC ships normally embarked three, which all had to be kept on deck: parked aircraft had to be moved to the forward end when other aircraft were landing on, and a collapsible safety barrier was fitted to prevent collisions. Hinged side screens or 'palisades' were fitted around the aft end of the flight deck to provide weather protection for parked aircraft but with only limited effect.

The net result of the modifications was a reduction in cargo capacity of about 10% in the case of the tankers, but almost 30% for the grain ships, the higher figure on account of the space taken up by the hangar. The modifications themselves were conceptually simple and with standardised designs and extensive use (about 51% by weight of steel) of prefabricated components, the average conversion time was just over five months, but there were significant differences between the average time required to convert new-builds (about 14 weeks) and existing ships (about 27 weeks). There were wide variations within groups; the first 'Triple Twelve', Rapana, was converted in five months while the final one, Macoma, took ten months. Delays arose through a variety of reasons, including labour relations and conflicting priorities in the shipyards, but the supply of arrester gear which was also in high demand for the escort carrier programme was a particular bottleneck that limited the rate at which MAC ships could be completed.

The 'Triple Twelves' retained their original names, but the new-builds were given the prefix "Empire" in accordance with the policy for ships owned by the Ministry of War Transport and names that began with "Mac-", in a reference to their designation as MAC ships. Empire MacKendrick which was originally to have been named Empire MacKenzie had the unusual distinction of being renamed while still under construction in tribute to HMS Audacity, whose captain, Commander D. W. McKendrick RN, had been killed when she was sunk on convoy escort duty in 1941. Eventually, to avoid confusion with ordinary merchant ships, the Admiralty formally directed that MAC ships should be designated 'MAC Ship' in all correspondence.

== Cargo arrangements ==
Although the most distinctive feature of MACs is their aircraft carrier function, they were conceived at a time when a shortage of shipping capacity threatened to undermine the Allied invasion of North Africa and beyond, and careful planning was needed to maximise their military effectiveness with as little detriment as possible to the carriage of cargo. In their trading role, MACs operated under the aegis of the Ministry of War Transport, with day-to-day management falling to their owners or allotted shipping companies, while control of military aspects fell to the Admiralty, with a new section (the Trade Division DEMS Air Section) specially set up to act as co-ordinating authority.

The MAC ships operated on the North Atlantic route primarily in support of the 'ON' and 'HX' series of convoys. An alternative plan to operate tanker MACs with CU convoys between the United Kingdom and Curaçao was rejected because convoys on that route were too fast. Tankers on the North Atlantic route ordinarily loaded at New York City, but this was undesirable for the MACs because it would have been militarily wasteful to run them between the ON/HX landfall port of Halifax, Nova Scotia and New York, where convoys were already under the umbrella of land-based aircraft. An 'oil pool' was therefore established at Halifax specifically to enable the tanker MACs to load there, while grain MACs were already able to use the port's pre-existing bulk loading facility. The Firth of Clyde was initially designated as the UK terminus for all MAC cargoes because of its superior aviation training facilities. On discovering that it would take more than a week to unload a single ship at the un-modernised facility in Glasgow, it was decided that grain MACs would discharge at Alexandra Dock, Liverpool, where two grain ships could be unloaded simultaneously in thirty-six hours. Tanker MACs normally discharged on the Clyde, with the Mersey as an alternative.

== Aviation arrangements ==
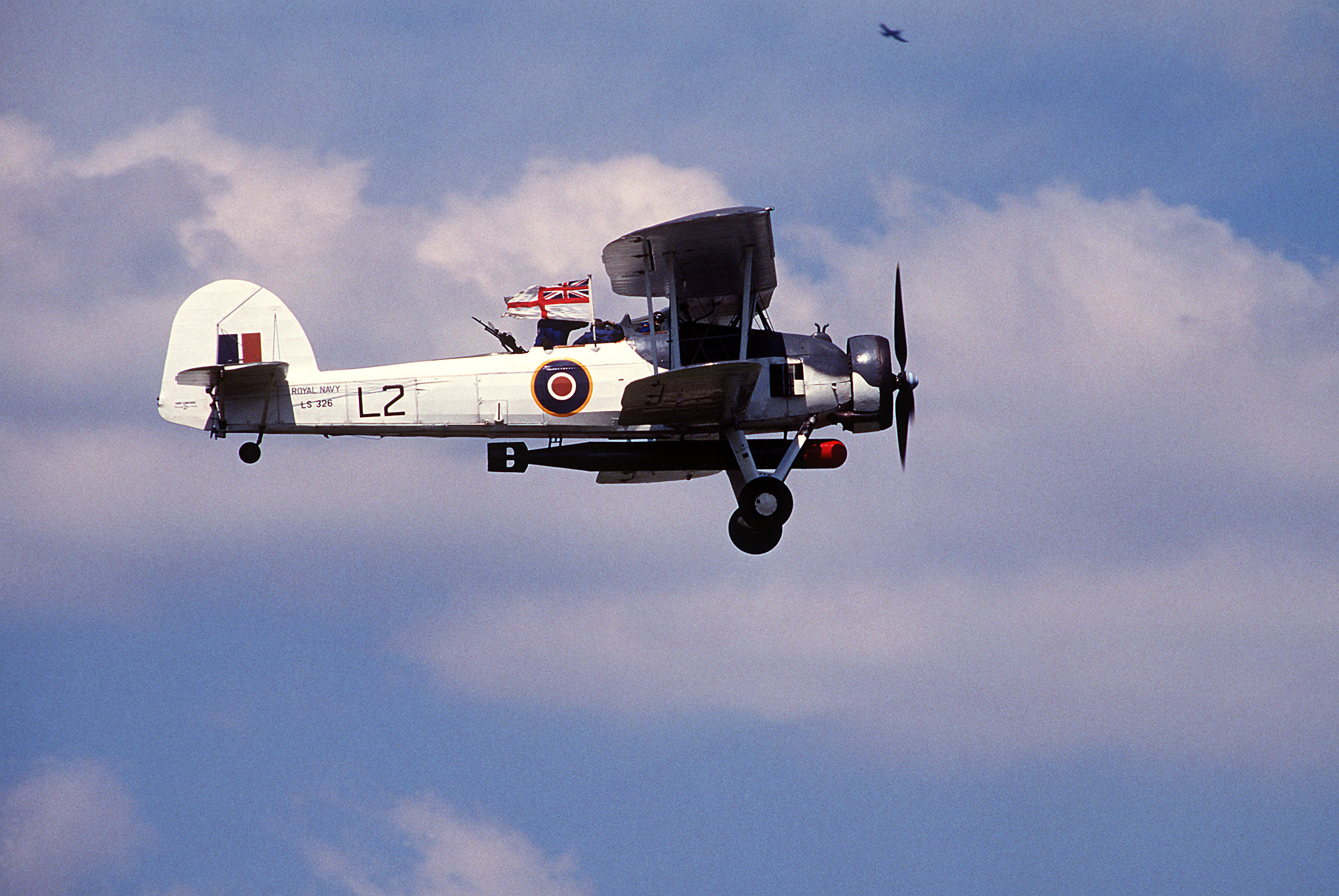
Fairey Swordfish at an airshow in 1988. This aircraft was assigned to 'L' Flight of 836 NAS on board the MAC ship Rapana during World War II

There were widely differing opinions about the arrangements needed to support the MAC ships' aviation function. The Director of Trade Division, who had overall responsibility for co-ordination within the Admiralty, envisaged forming a new headquarters organisation to oversee MAC ship aviation. The Director of Naval Air Organisation disagreed on the basis that MAC ships were an adjunct to the main escort carrier programme, and said that their aircraft should be provided on an ad hoc basis from the squadrons earmarked for escort carriers, having earlier suggested that there might be few, if any, aircraft and crews available for MAC ships. However, when the escort carrier HMS Dasher exploded and sank in March 1943 it freed up a squadron's-worth of Swordfish aircraft and in June, just after Empire MacAlpine entered service, it was announced that No. 836 Naval Air Squadron (NAS) was to relocate from Machrihanish to Belfast in Northern Ireland with nine aircraft as a core for the MAC ships, in addition to providing a common pool for the escort carriers. Before this could be put into place, it was decided that 836 NAS would move instead to Royal Naval Air Station (RNAS) Maydown, in County Londonderry (later named HMS Shrike) to become the nucleus squadron for MAC ships and that the MAC ship headquarters unit would be formed there. 840 Naval Air Squadron operated briefly from Empire MacAndrew until reorganised as M flight of 836 Squadron in August 1943. Also based at Maydown would be the Royal Netherlands Navy-manned No. 860 Naval Air Squadron, responsible for providing aircraft for the two Dutch MAC ships, Gadila and Macoma.

=== Aircraft ===
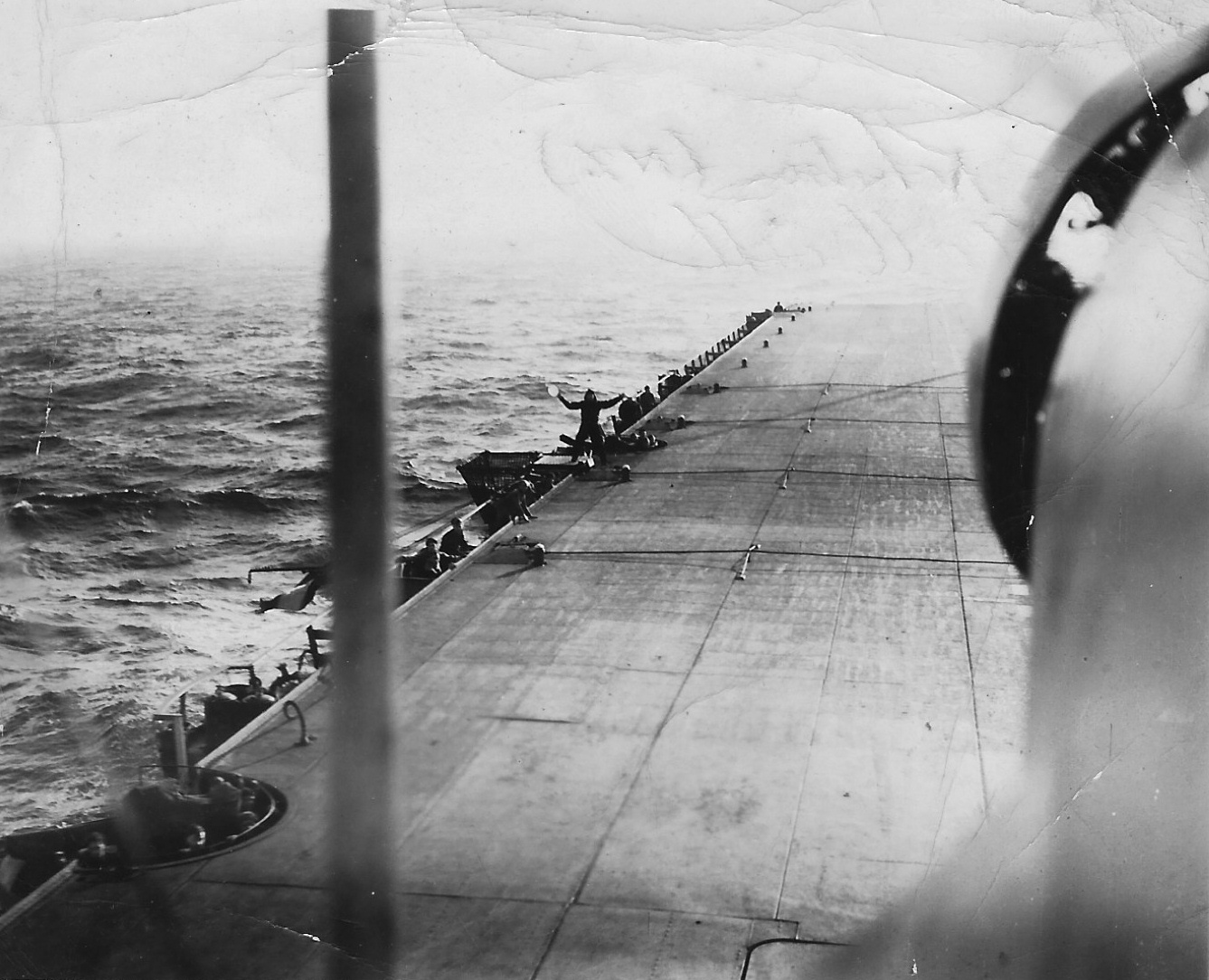
Fairey Swordfish landing on the deck of the Empire MacKay in the North Atlantic in 1944

The only aircraft types to be flown operationally from MAC ships were the Fairey Swordfish Mks. II and III. The flight deck was only 16 ft 6 in (5.03 m) wider than the Swordfish wing span, and a Swordfish fully loaded with RP-3 rockets and depth charges might require rocket-assisted take-off gear (RATOG) to launch in unfavourable wind conditions. The normal complement of aircraft was four on grain ships and three on tankers. The tankers were, however, capable of routinely carrying four aircraft and the Dutch MACs Gadila and Macoma did so on a number of occasions, while the only report of four aircraft on board a British tanker related to an emergency diversion. Lieutenant (later Captain) Eric "Winkle" Brown made a trial landing of a Martlet fighter onto Amastra in October 1943 when the use of MACs in the Pacific was being briefly considered.

== MAC ship crews ==
MAC ship crews were substantially larger than ordinary merchant ships of similar types. In addition to the air party, they carried extra Merchant Navy radio officers, engineer officers (to maintain and operate the arrester gear), catering staff and, because the total number of crew would exceed 100, a doctor, as required by the Merchant Shipping Act. In practice, it proved difficult to find civilian doctors and medical officers were normally provided by the Royal Navy.

=== Air party ===
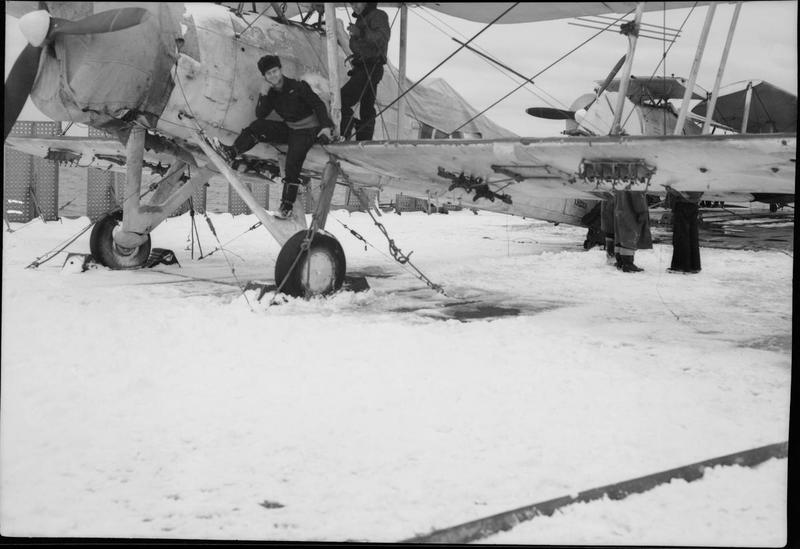
Members of the air party and two Swordfish aircraft on the snow-covered flight deck of MV Ancylus.

The air party were responsible for flying and supporting the aircraft. The official manning scale comprised a lieutenant commander RN or RNVR who, as Air Staff Officer, was the master's principal adviser on naval and aviation matters; a pilot, observer and air gunner for each aircraft carried; three signalmen; five communications and armament ratings; and at least seventeen aircraft fitters. A seventeen-strong DEMS team of RN and Royal Artillery personnel looked after the MAC ships' substantial defensive armament. To comply with the Board of Trade regulations, all naval and military personnel were signed onto the ship's Articles as supernumerary crew members, for which they received a nominal payment of one shilling per month and the more tangible reward of one can of beer per day. They also received a small 'Merchant Navy' badge, which many apparently wore on their uniforms with cheerful disregard for regulations.

== Operational effectiveness ==
By the time the MAC ships entered service the Battle of the Atlantic had already swung permanently in the Allies' favour through a variety of converging factors. From the beginning of 1944 almost every convoy outbound from the British Isles to North America (ON) and Halifax convoys (HX) that went east-bound to the British Isles contained at least one MAC ship and frequently more. Although MAC ship Swordfish made a dozen attacks, no U-boat was ever destroyed by the four thousand sorties flown from the nineteen MAC ships. Nevertheless, according to the official Naval Staff History:

"Frequently when there were no kills it was the very presence of aircraft, carrier-borne or shore-based, or both which prevented the development of the attack by a concentration of U-boats on the convoy and which allowed it to continue on its way unmolested."

It is sometimes claimed that MAC ships enjoyed a near-perfect record in preventing U-boat attacks. In fact, a number of ships were lost to U-boats while sailing in convoys protected by MACs, including six merchantmen and three escorts from the combined convoys ONS 18/ON 202, despite the presence of MAC Ship Empire MacAlpine, and two merchantmen and an escort from SC 143 protected by Rapana. There can be little doubt, however, that the MAC ships' contribution to the Battle of the Atlantic was important and highly valued by the seafarers they protected. Merchant ship masters at a pre-convoy conference are said to have cheered when told that a MAC ship would be sailing with the convoy.

Early in 1944 it was agreed that MAC ships could be used to help clear a backlog of more than 500 aircraft awaiting shipment to the United Kingdom and, as the year progressed, a number of MAC ships made non-operational ferry crossings with full deck cargoes of aircraft. In September 1944, some MAC ships were fitted with equipment to refuel escorts by means of a hose streamed over the stern. By this time it was becoming apparent that all nineteen MAC ships were no longer required to protect Atlantic convoys. The possibility of using them in the Pacific as aircraft carriers or fleet oilers had been considered earlier but rejected on the grounds of cost-effectiveness and in September/October 1944, Acavus, Amastra, Ancylus and Rapana were taken out of service for reinstatement as conventional merchant ships at an estimated cost to the Government of £40,000 each. The remaining MAC ships were released for reinstatement at the end of May 1945.

== MAC ships ==
=== New-build grain carriers ===
Approximately 8,000 tons deep load, 12 knots, 4 aircraft, crew 107, entered service April 1943 – March 1944. Operated by the Hain Steamship Company except Empire MacAlpine and Empire MacKendrick which were operated by Ben Line Steamers. Equipped with hangar and lift. Armament: 1 x single 4 in (102 mm) QF MK IV, 2 x single 40 mm Bofors, 4 x single 20 mm Oerlikon cannons.

- MV Empire MacAlpine
- MV Empire MacAndrew
- MV Empire MacCallum
- MV Empire MacDermott
- MV Empire MacKendrick
- MV Empire MacRae

=== New-build oil tankers ===
Approximately 9,000 tons deep load, 11 knots, 3/4 aircraft, crew 122, entered service October – December 1943. Operated by the British Tanker Company except Empire MacKay which was operated by Anglo-Saxon Petroleum. No hangar and lift; aircraft maintained and stored on deck. Armament: 1 x single 4 in (102 mm) QF MK IV, 8 x single 20 mm Oerlikon cannons.

- Empire MacCabe
- Empire MacColl
- Empire MacKay
- Empire MacMahon

=== 'Triple Twelve' oil tankers ===
8,000 tons standard, 16,000 tons deep load, 12 knots, 3/4 aircraft, crew 118 (64 RN plus 54 MN), entered service (as MACs) July 1943 – May 1944. Operated by Anglo-Saxon Petroleum except Gadila and Macoma which were under Dutch registry, but like Anglo-Saxon Petroleum, also a subsidiary of Shell. No hangar and lift; aircraft maintained and stored on deck. Armament: 1 x single 4 in (102 mm) QF MK IV, 2 x single 40 mm Bofors, 6 x single 20 mm Oerlikon cannons. These ships were called Triple Twelves because with a deadweight tonnage of 12,000 each consumed 12 tons of fuel per day at a speed of twelve knots.

- MV Acavus
- MV Adula
- MV Alexia
- MV Amastra
- MV Ancylus: operated Swordfish II of 'O' Flight, 860 NAS
- MV Gadila: operated under Dutch registry with Swordfish of 'S' Flight, 860 NAS
- MV Macoma: operated under Dutch registry with Swordfish of 'O' (later 'F') Flight, 860 NAS
- MV Miralda
- MV Rapana: operated Swordfish II of 'L' Flight, 836 NAS

Amastra and Ancylus ceased operating Swordfish in late 1944, the empty decks often being used to ferry aircraft from the US to the UK.

== See also ==
- Aircraft cruiser – Type of warship
- Armed merchantman – Merchant ship equipped with guns, usually for defensive purposes
- CAM ship – British merchant ships with onboard fighter aircraft
- Fighter catapult armed auxiliary ship – Type of Royal Navy warship
- List of aircraft carriers of World War II
- Shimane Maru-class and Yamashio Maru-class, Japanese Navy and Army carriers similar in concept.
