= Royal Navy Historic Flight =

Historic aircraft display team of the Royal Navy

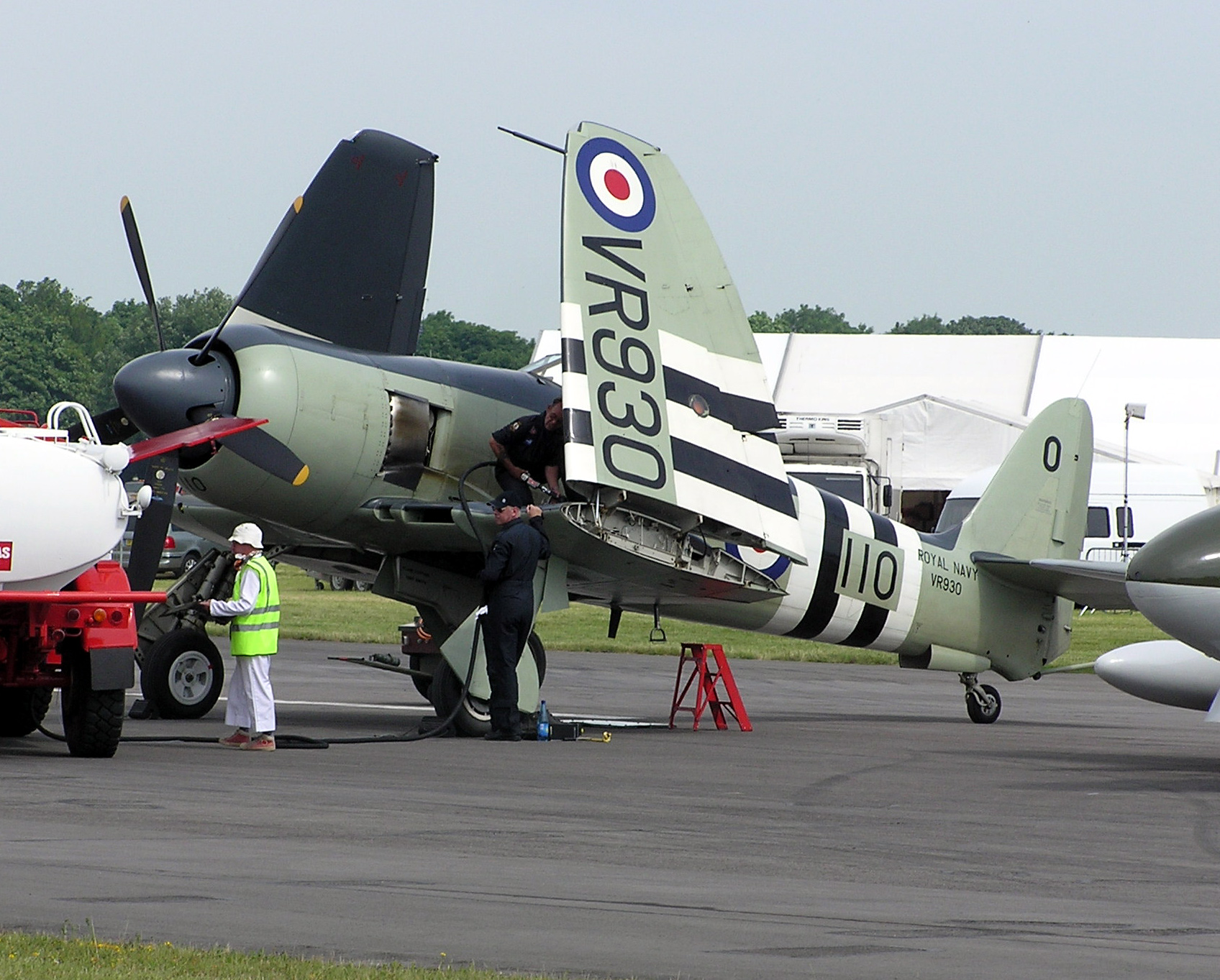
- Hawker Sea Fury FB.11 VR930 with wings folded, at Kemble Airfield, Gloucestershire, England
- Active: 1972 – 31 Mar 2019
- Allegiance: United Kingdom
- Branch: Royal Navy
- Type: Naval Historic Flight
- Part of: Fleet Air Arm
- Garrison/HQ: RNAS Yeovilton (HMS Heron)
- Equipment: Fairey Swordfish; Fairey Firefly; Sea Fury; Sea Hawk

Commanders
- Current commander: Lieutenant-Commander Chris Götke AFC
- Commodore-in-Chief: Prince Andrew, Duke of York

The Royal Navy Historic Flight (RNHF) was the historic flight of the Fleet Air Arm of the Royal Navy up until its disbandment in March 2019. The RNHF maintained and flew a small number of aircraft that were important to British Naval aviation. The organisation was not part of the military establishment; it had charitable status and was staffed by civilians. It was based at RNAS Yeovilton and provided aircraft for air displays.

Following its disbandment, the Swordfish Mk.I (W5856), Sea Fury FB.11 (VR930), Sea Hawk FGA.6 (WV908) and Chipmunk T.10 (WK608) were donated to the Fly Navy Heritage Trust at an approximate value of £1,810,000. With the aircraft having now been transferred to the civilian register, displays will be funded from charity events run by the Fly Navy Heritage Trust.

== History ==
The RNHF was established at RNAS Yeovilton in 1972 and became the home for a number of aircraft that had been donated to the Royal Navy over more than a decade. The first aircraft was Fairey Swordfish II LS326, presented in 1960 by Westland Aircraft. In 1971, Hawker Siddeley Aviation presented a Hawker Sea Fury FB.11 and in 1972 a Fairey Firefly AS.5 WB271 was donated. The separate units caring for the three aircraft were merged in 1972, forming the Historic Flight.

Over the following years, the RNHF benefitted further from gifts of aircraft from the German government, Royal Navy and British Aerospace. Technical assistance was also obtained to rebuild and refurbish aircraft. Three aircraft have been lost in accidents, with two fatalities.

In 1995, the ground staff service personnel were replaced by civilian employees but aircrew remained as serving navy pilots who volunteered to spend free time with the RNHF. Air training used the Flight's DHC Chipmunk. The Fly Navy Heritage Trust (Navy Wings), formerly the Swordfish Heritage Trust, a charitable institution to oversee fundraising, made grants to fund the RNHF's staff. The Flight's other sources of income were fees from flying displays, direct donations from the general public and sponsorship from the aerospace industry.

The Royal Navy previously described the role of the historic flight:

The RNHF is an educational charity whose mission is to ensure that the unique British Heritage collection of the Royal Navy Historic Flight continue to fly long into the future. Their aim is to preserve the opportunity for future generations to best understand the nature of those who built, maintained, operated and fought in Naval aircraft of the past by experiencing the reality of the sound, smell and the sight of them actually flying. They delight millions with their air displays nationwide and educated future generations.

== Aircraft ==
Aircraft type	Serial	Operational dates	Squadrons	Notes
Fairey Swordfish Mk.I	W5856	21 Oct 1941 - 1945		Used as a training aircraft during the war and kept in reserve. Served with the Mediterranean Fleet for a year and restored to flying condition in 1993. A long-term rebuild was completed in 2015, returning the aircraft to airworthy condition.
Fairey Swordfish Mk.II	LS326	Aug 1943 - 1945	836	War-time service on MAC ships, including MV Rapana and Empire MacCallum. Appeared as aircraft '5A' in the film Sink the Bismarck!. Following discovery of corrosion in 2002 the aircraft was withdrawn from service. New wing spars were manufactured by BAE Systems as part of a complete restoration. As of November 2010, LS326 is airworthy.
Fairey Swordfish Mk.III	NF389	Apr 1944	Aircraft Torpedo Development Unit, Torpedo Trials Flight, 781 NAS	Under reconstruction (Jan 2009).
Fairey Firefly AS.5	WB271	Jun 1949 - 1962	814 NAS, RAN service: 816 NAS, 724 NAS, 723 NAS	Destroyed during an air display, July 2003; aircrew (Bill Murton and Neil Rix) killed
Hawker Sea Fury FB.11	TF956	Oct 1947 - 1954	805 (RAN), 799, 807, 738	Lost 10 June 1989, due to hydraulic failure in flight; aircrew survived.
Hawker Sea Fury T.20	WG655	Oct 1951 - Dec 1955		Seriously damaged 14 July 1990 after engine failure in flight; aircrew survived. The aircraft was later sold and rebuilt to airworthy condition. Based at Duxford, registered G-INVN, the aircraft was severely damaged in a forced landing at Harston, Cambridgeshire on 4 August 2020 following an engine failure.
Hawker Sea Fury T.20	VX281	? - ?		Damaged in emergency landing during RNAS Culdrose Air Day 31 July 2014. The pilot, Lt Cdr Chris Götke (CO of the Flight) was awarded the Air Force Cross in an Operational Honours list on 26 February 2015. Suffered serious damage in a forced landing April 28, 2021 after engine problems. Aircraft landed in a field near RNAS Yeovilton. Both pilots were taken to a local hospital, where one was kept overnight for observation.
Hawker Sea Fury FB.11	VR930	Mar 1948 - Jan 1961	802	Out of use.
Hawker/Armstrong Whitworth Sea Hawk FGA.6	WV908	Feb 1955 - Jun 1962	807, 898, 806, 738	In storage.
de Havilland DHC-1 Chipmunk T.10	WK608	June 1966 - 1993 (naval service)		Used as air trainer. Airworthy.

== Gallery ==
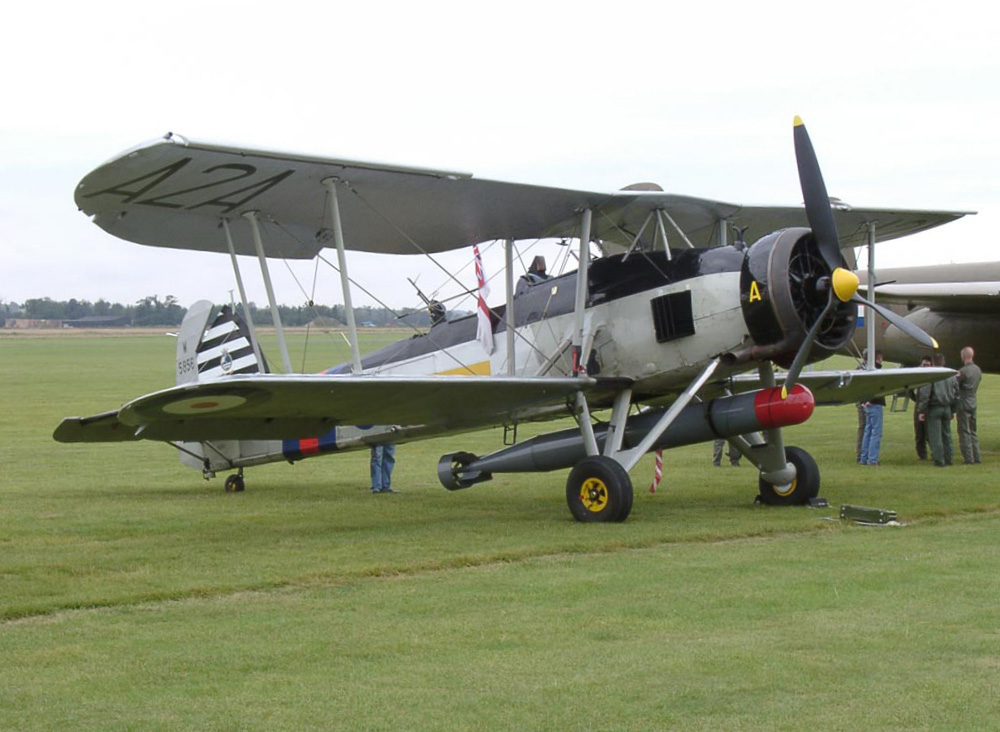
Mk.I Fairey Swordfish W5856 at Duxford in 2002

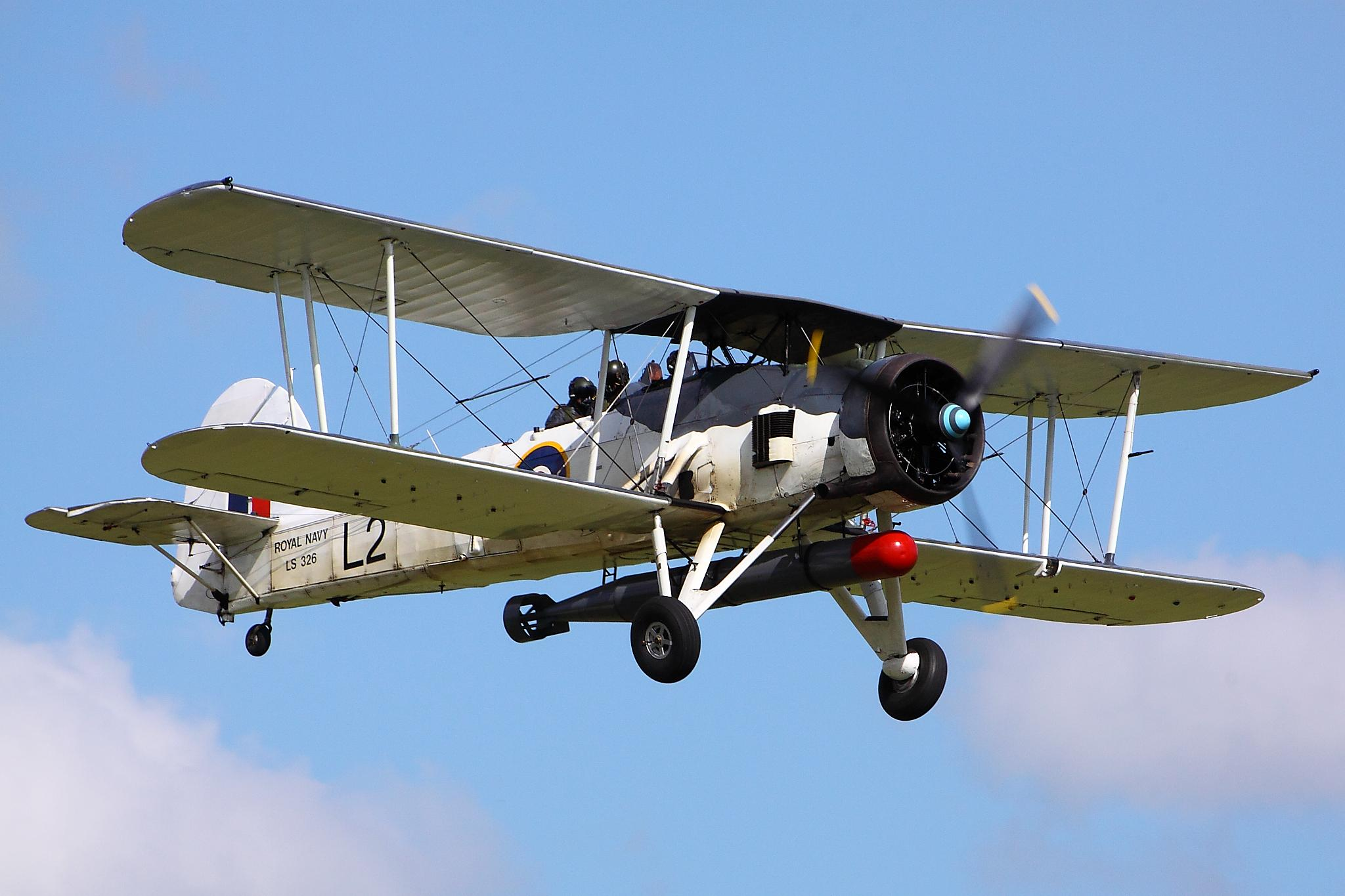
Mk.II Fairey Swordfish LS326 flying at Duxford Flying Legends in 2012

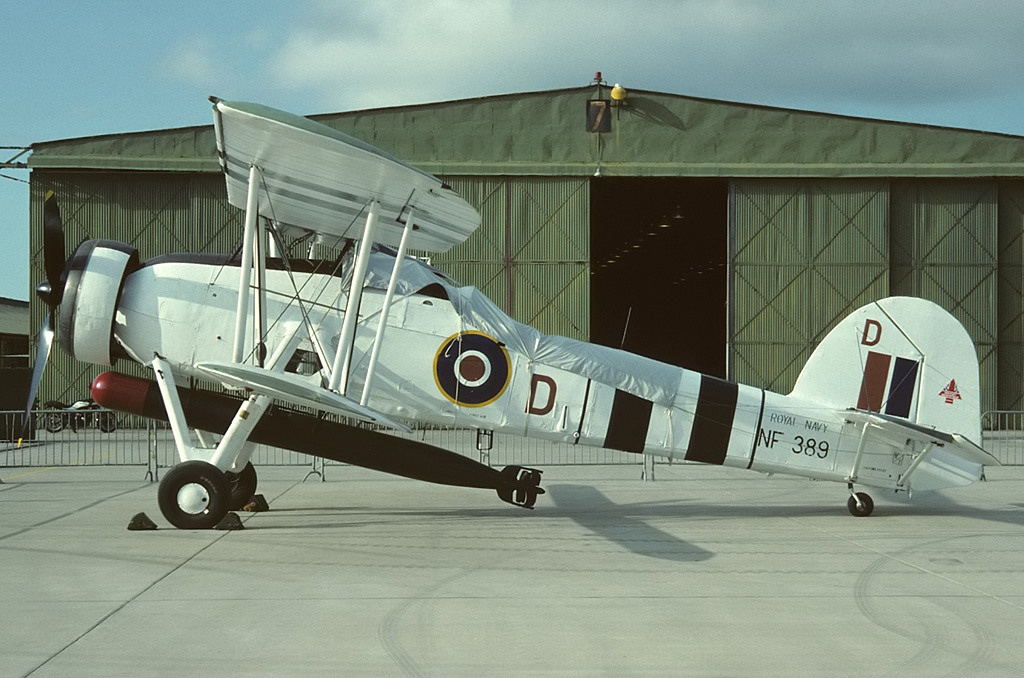
Mk.III Fairey Swordfish NF389 at Yeovilton in 1994

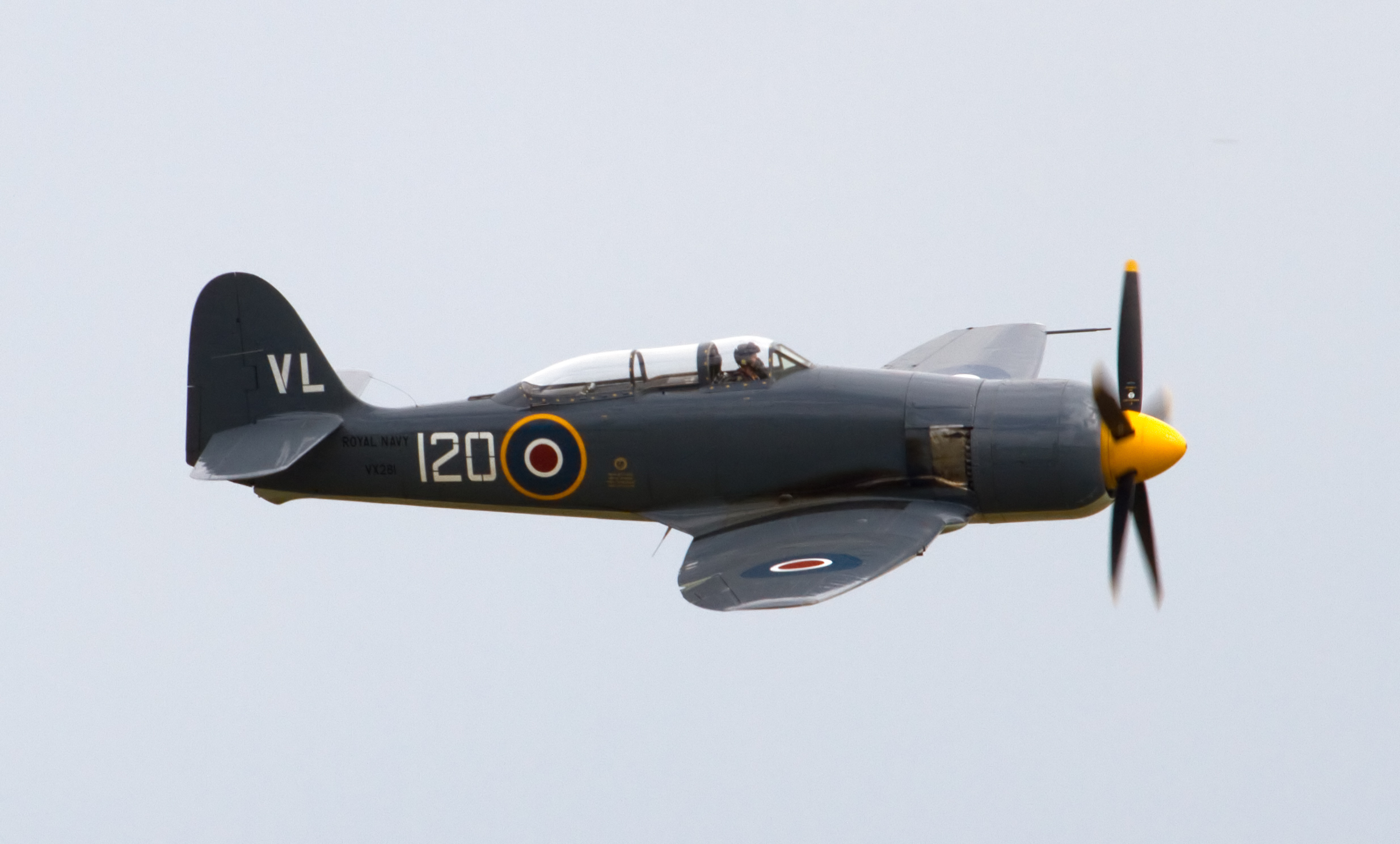
Hawker Sea Fury VX281 in 2011

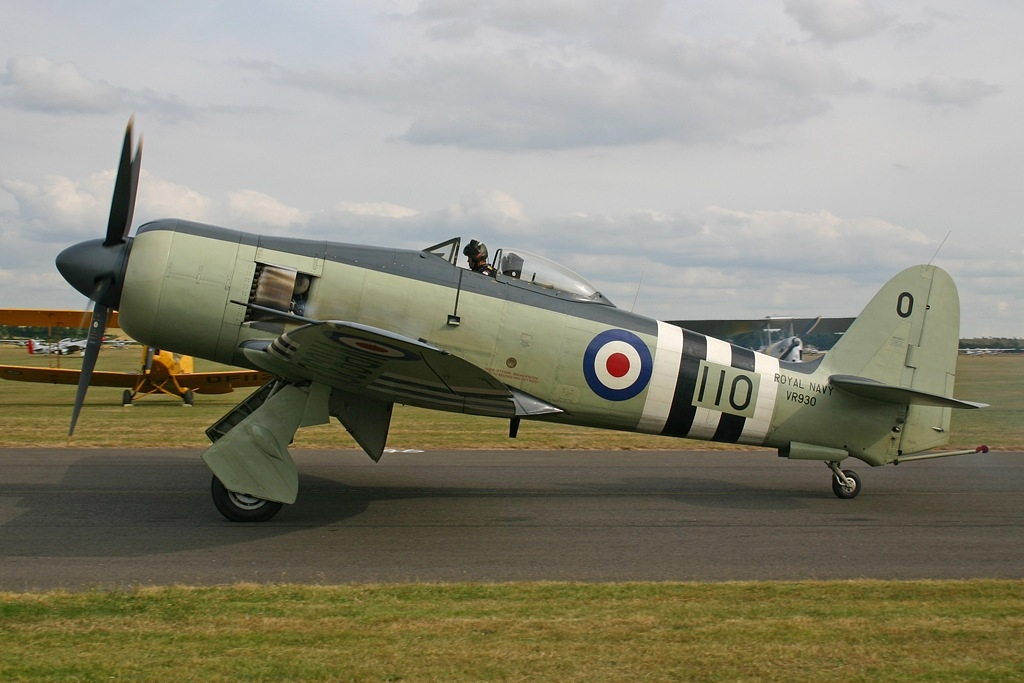
Hawker Sea Fury VR930 at Duxford in 2006

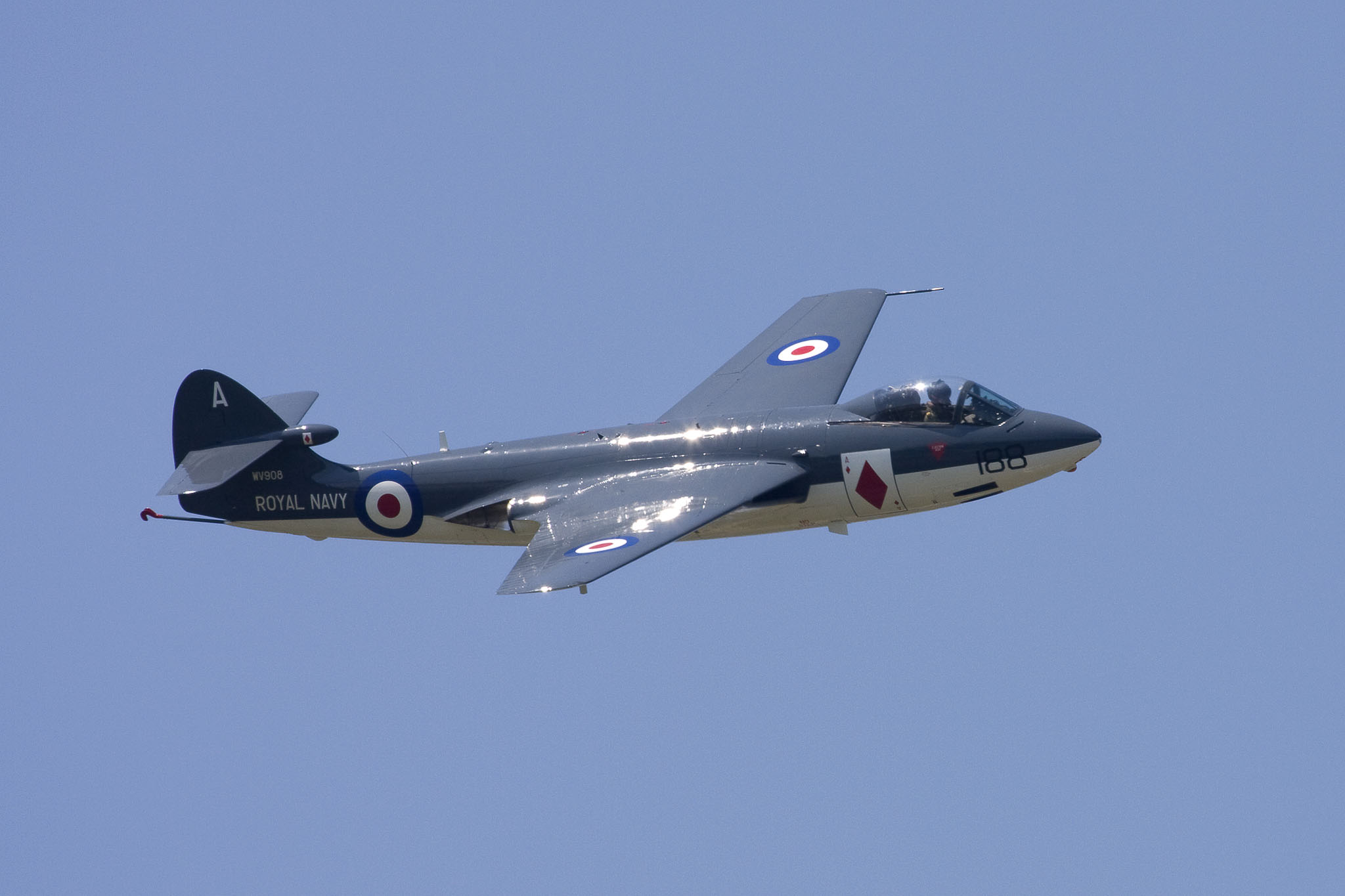
Hawker Sea Hawk WV908 in 2008

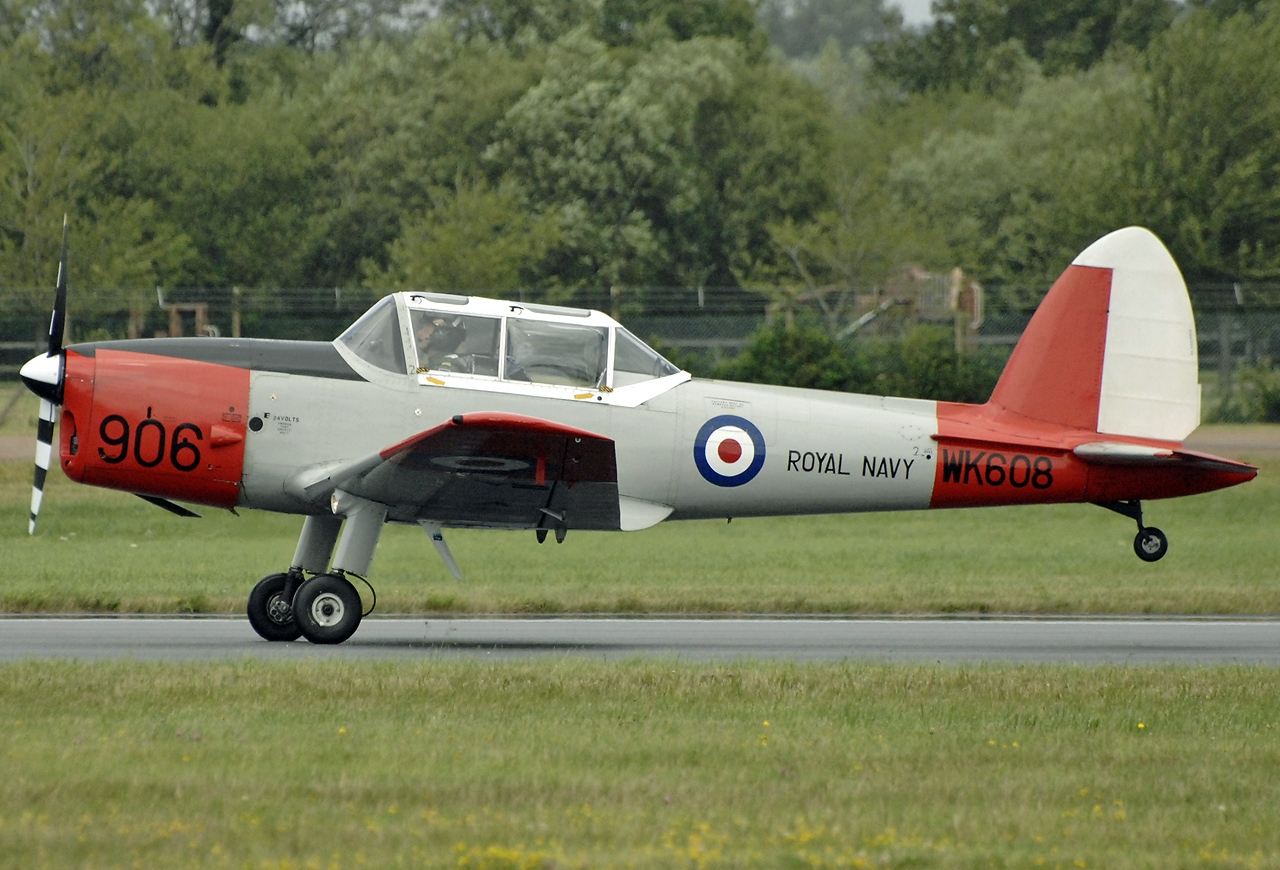
De Havilland Chipmunk WK608 at Fairford in 2009

== See also ==
- Battle of Britain Memorial Flight – similar unit of the Royal Air Force
