= MV Empire MacColl =

World War II merchant ship of the United Kingdom

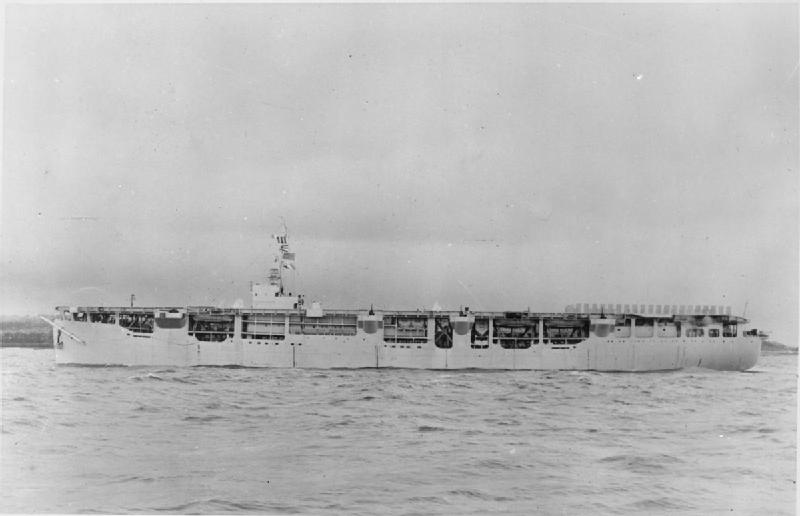
- MV Empire MacColl.

History

United Kingdom
- Name: Empire MacColl
- Owner: Ministry of War Transport
- Operator: British Tanker Co. Ltd.
- Builder: Laird, Son & Co., Birkenhead
- Launched: 24 July 1943
- Renamed: British Pilot in 1946
- Fate: Scrapped Faslane 1962

General characteristics
- Tonnage: 9,133 GRT
- Length: 463 ft (141 m) (pp) 481 ft 6 in (146.76 m) (oa)
- Beam: 61 ft 9 in (18.82 m)
- Depth: 27 ft 9 in (8.46 m)
- Propulsion: Diesel; one shaft; 3,300 bhp
- Speed: 11 knots (20 km/h)
- Complement: 110
- Armament: 1 × 4 in (100 mm); 8 × 20 mm
- Aircraft carried: Four Fairey Swordfish

MV Empire MacColl was an oil tanker converted to a merchant aircraft carrier (MAC) ship.

MV Empire MacColl was built by Laird, Son & Co., Birkenhead under order from the Ministry of War Transport. She entered service as a MAC ship in November 1943, however only her air crew and the necessary maintenance staff were naval personnel. She was operated by the British Tanker Company.

She returned to merchant service as an oil tanker in 1946 and was eventually scrapped in Faslane in 1962.
