= MV Empire MacKay =

World War II merchant ship of the United Kingdom

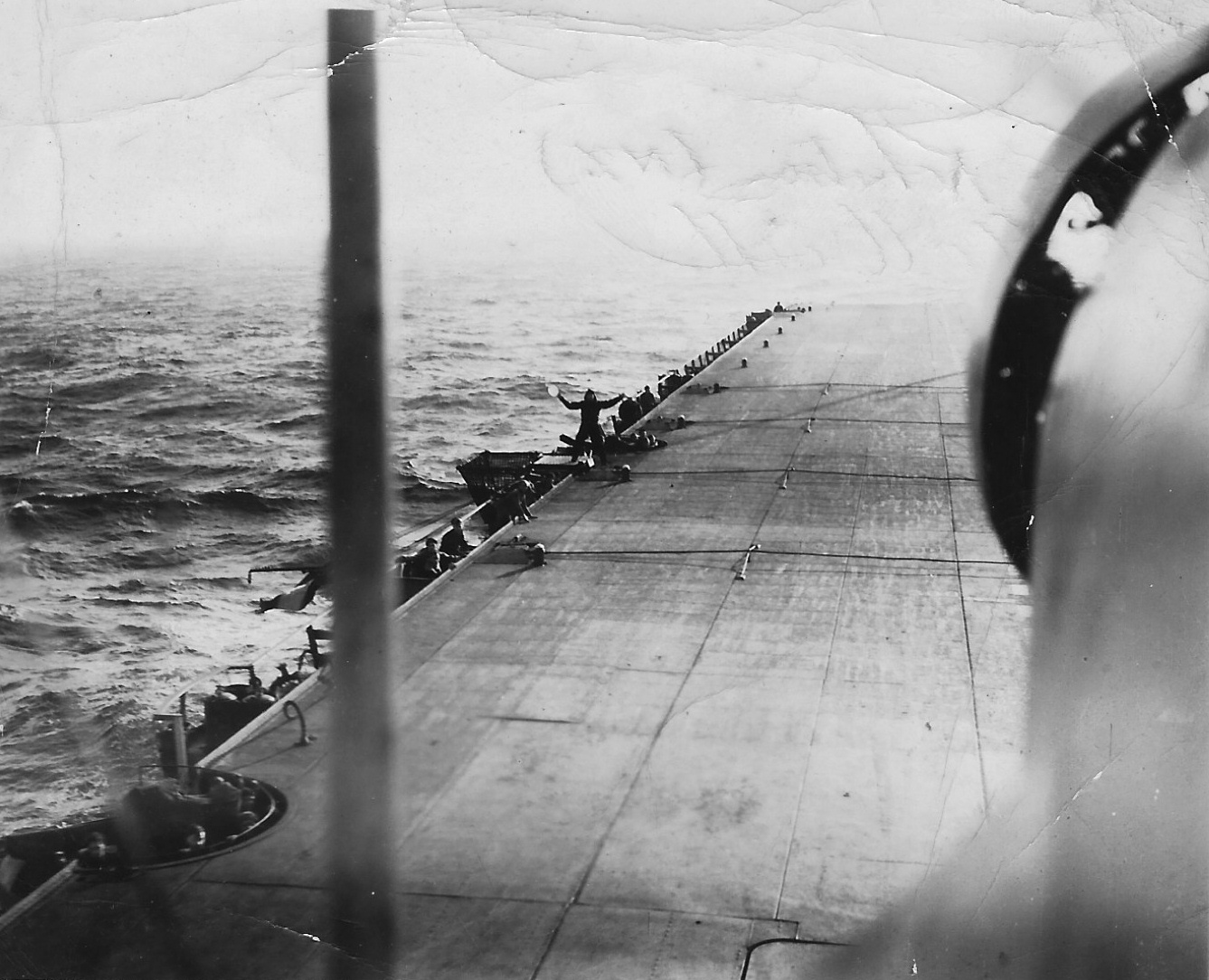
- Fairey Swordfish landing on Empire MacKay in 1944

History

United Kingdom
- Name: Empire MacKay
- Owner: Ministry of War Transport
- Operator: British Tanker Co. Ltd.
- Builder: Harland & Wolff, Govan
- Yard number: 1167
- Launched: 17 June 1943
- Completed: 5 October 1943
- Renamed: British Swordfish in 1946
- Fate: Scrapped Rotterdam 1959

General characteristics
- Tonnage: 8,908 GRT
- Length: 460 ft (140 m) (pp) 482 ft 9 in (147.14 m) (oa)
- Beam: 59 ft (18 m)
- Depth: 27 ft 6 in (8.38 m)
- Propulsion: Diesel; one shaft; 3,300 bhp
- Speed: 11 knots (20 km/h)
- Complement: 110
- Armament: 1 × 4 in (100 mm); 8 × 20 mm
- Aircraft carried: Four Fairey Swordfish

MV Empire MacKay was an oil tanker constructed with rudimentary aircraft handling facilities as a merchant aircraft carrier (MAC ship).

MV Empire MacKay was built by Harland & Wolff, Govan under order from the Ministry of War Transport. She entered service as a MAC ship in October 1943, however only her air crew and the necessary maintenance staff were naval personnel. She was operated by the British Tanker Company.

She returned to merchant service as an oil tanker in 1946 as British Swordfish and she was eventually scrapped in Rotterdam in 1959.
