= MV Empire MacCallum =

World War II merchant ship of the United Kingdom

History

United Kingdom
- Name: Empire MacCallum
- Owner: Ministry of War Transport
- Operator: Hain Steam Ship Co Ltd
- Builder: Lithgows, Glasgow, Scotland
- Launched: 12 October 1943
- Renamed: Doris Clunies in 1947; Sunrover in 1951; Eudoxia in 1957; Phorkyss in 1959
- Fate: Scrapped Osaka 1960

General characteristics
- Tonnage: 8,250 GRT
- Length: 425 ft (130 m) (pp) 444 ft 6 in (135.48 m) (oa)
- Beam: 57 ft 9 in (17.60 m)
- Depth: 24 ft 6 in (7.47 m)
- Propulsion: Diesel; one shaft; 3,300 bhp
- Speed: 12.5 knots (23.2 km/h)
- Complement: 107
- Armament: 1 × 4 in (100 mm); 2 × 40 mm; 4 × 20 mm
- Aircraft carried: Four Fairey Swordfish

MV Empire MacCallum was a grain ship converted to a merchant aircraft carrier or MAC ship.

== History ==
MV Empire MacCallum was built at Lithgows shipyard, Glasgow, Scotland, under order from the Ministry of War Transport. As a MAC ship, only her air crew and the necessary maintenance staff were naval personnel, She was operated by Hain Steam Ship Co Ltd of St Ives. On 7 July 1944, a Fairey Swordfish aircraft mistakenly sank the Free French submarine Perle in the Atlantic Ocean off the coast of Newfoundland. Among the aircraft that served on Empire MacCallum was Fairey Swordfish Mk II LS326 where it became part of 'K' flight. The aircraft had previously been on Rapana. In November 2010, it was airworthy with the Royal Navy Historic Flight.

After the war, the ship was converted to a grain carrier, and eventually scrapped at Osaka in 1960.

== See also ==
- List of aircraft carriers
