= MV Macoma =

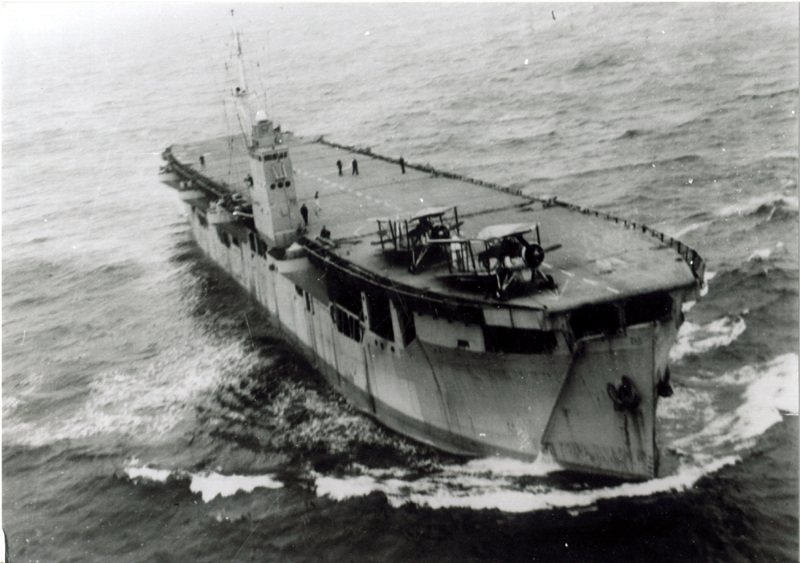
- MV Macoma

History

Netherlands
- Name: Macoma
- Owner: Anglo Saxon Royal Dutch/Shell
- Operator: Anglo Saxon Royal Dutch/Shell
- Builder: Nederlandsche Scheepsbouw Maatschappij, Amsterdam
- Launched: 31 December 1935
- Fate: Scrapped Hong Kong 1959

General characteristics
- Tonnage: 8,011 GRT
- Length: 463 ft (141 m) (pp) 481 ft (147 m) (oa)
- Beam: 59 ft (18 m)
- Draught: 27 ft 6 in (8.38 m)
- Propulsion: Diesel; one shaft; 4,000 bhp
- Speed: 13 knots (24 km/h)
- Complement: 100
- Armament: 1 × 4 in (100 mm); 8 × 20 mm
- Aircraft carried: Four Fairey Swordfish

MV Macoma was one of nine Anglo Saxon Royal Dutch/Shell oil tankers converted to become a Merchant Aircraft Carrier (MAC ship). The group is sometimes collectively known as the Rapana Class. Macoma was launched on 31 December 1935 at Nederlandsche Scheepsbouw Maatschappij, Amsterdam as an oil tanker and entered service the following year. She was converted to a MAC ship from late 1943 to April 1944, and commissioned 1 April 1944.

As a MAC ship, she had no aircraft hangar, and continued to carry normal cargoes, although operating under Royal Navy control. Only her air crew and aviation support staff were naval personnel. In the case of the Macoma, these were provided by the Royal Netherlands Navy including the Dutch Fleet Air Arm 860 and 861 squadrons.

The Macoma and her sister MV Gadila were the first aircraft carrying vessels with a flight deck to be operated under the flag of the Netherlands.

After the war, MV Macoma was reconverted and returned to merchant service as an oil tanker and served in that role until scrapped in Hong Kong in 1959.
