= MV Empire MacRae =

World War II merchant ship of the United Kingdom

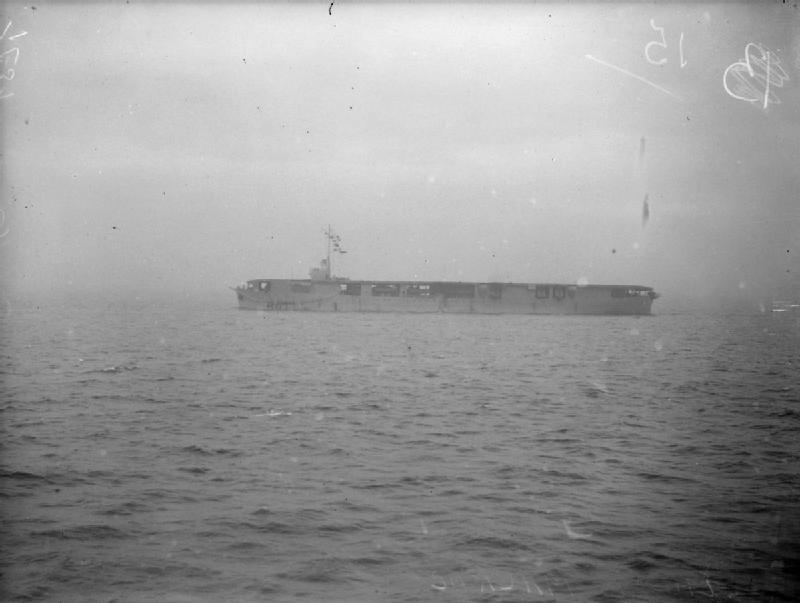
- The MV Empire MacRae.

History

United Kingdom
- Name: Empire MacRae
- Owner: Ministry of War Transport
- Operator: Hain Steam Ship Co Ltd
- Builder: Lithgows, Glasgow, Scotland
- Launched: 21 June 1943
- Renamed: Alpha Zambesi in 1947; Tobon in 1954; Depina in 1967
- Fate: Scrapped Taiwan 1971

General characteristics
- Tonnage: 8,250 GRT
- Length: 425 ft (130 m) (pp) 444 ft 6 in (135.48 m) (oa)
- Beam: 57 ft 9 in (17.60 m)
- Depth: 24 ft 6 in (7.47 m)
- Propulsion: Diesel; one shaft; 3,300 bhp
- Speed: 12.5 knots (23.2 km/h)
- Complement: 107
- Armament: 1 × 4 in (100 mm); 2 × 40 mm; 4 × 20 mm
- Aircraft carried: Four Fairey Swordfish

MV Empire MacRae was a grain ship converted to become a Merchant Aircraft Carrier or MAC ship during the Second World War.

She was built at Lithgows shipyard in Glasgow, Scotland, under order from the Ministry of War Transport. As a MAC ship, only her air crew and the necessary maintenance staff were naval personnel and she was operated by Hain Steam Ship Co Ltd of St Ives.

After the war, the ship was converted to a grain carrier and was eventually scrapped at Kaohsiung in 1971.

== See also ==
- List of aircraft carriers
