= MV Gadila =

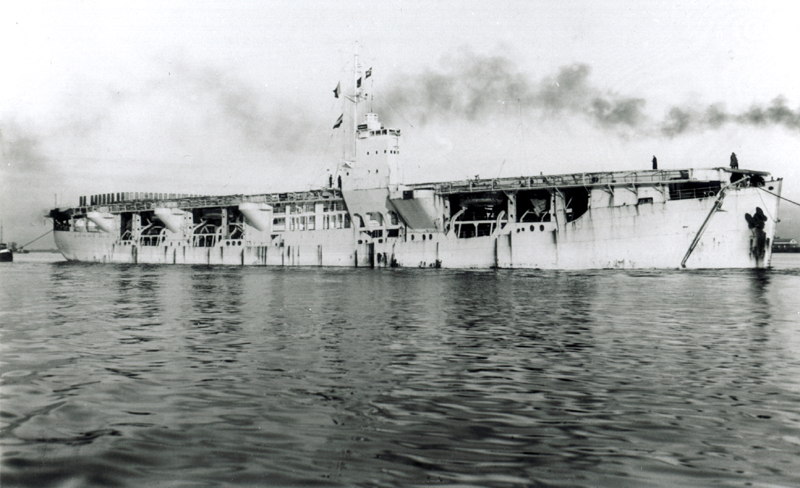
- MV Gadila

History

Netherlands
- Name: Gadila
- Builder: Howaldtswerke, Kiel
- Launched: 1 December 1934
- Honours and awards: Atlantic convoys
- Fate: Scrapped Hong Kong 1958

General characteristics
- Tonnage: 7,999 GRT
- Length: 463 ft (141 m) pp; 481 ft (147 m) oa
- Beam: 59 ft (18 m)
- Draught: 27 ft 6 in (8.38 m)
- Propulsion: Diesel; one shaft; 4,000 bhp
- Speed: 13 knots (24 km/h)
- Complement: 100
- Armament: 1 × 4 in (100 mm) gun; 8 × 20 mm
- Aircraft carried: Four Fairey Swordfish

MV Gadila was one of nine Anglo Saxon Royal Dutch/Shell oil tankers converted to become a Merchant Aircraft Carrier (MAC ship). The group is sometimes collectively known as the Rapana class.

MV Gadila was built at the Howaldtswerke, Kiel, Germany and completed 11 April 1935 as an oil tanker for the Royal Dutch/Shell line. She was converted at Smith's Dock, North Shields between April 1943 and 1 February 1944. She entered service as a MAC ship in March 1944, and operated under the Netherlands Mercantile Marine flag.

As a MAC ship, she had no aircraft hangar, and continued to carry normal cargoes with a mercantile ship's crew, although operating under British Royal Navy control. Only her air crew and the aviation support staff were Naval personnel. In the case of the Gadila, these were provided by the Royal Netherlands Navy and served as elements of Fleet Air Arm 860 (Dutch) Naval Air Squadron.

The Gadila and her sister MV Macoma were the first aircraft carrying vessels with a flight deck to be operated under the flag of the Netherlands.

At the end of the war, Gadila was reconverted to an entirely mercantile oil tanker and served in this capacity until broken up for scrap in Hong Kong in 1958.
