= RNAS Maydown =

Former Royal Naval Air Station in County Londonderry, Northern Ireland

RNAS Maydown HMS Gannet II HMS Shrike
- Maydown, County Londonderry in Northern Ireland

Site information
- Type: Royal Naval Air Station
- Owner: Air Ministry; Admiralty
- Operator: Royal Air Force; Royal Navy
- Controlled by: RAF Fighter Command 1942-1943 * No. 13 Group RAF; Fleet Air Arm 1943-1947
- Condition: Disused

Location
- Shown within the Northern Ireland RNAS Maydown (the United Kingdom)
- Coordinates: 55°02′00″N 007°14′12″W

Site history
- Built: 1941/42 & 1943
- In use: July 1942 - January 1947
- Fate: Industry
- Battles/wars: European theatre of World War II

Garrison information
- Occupants: Formation and working up of TBR units

Airfield information
- Elevation: 50 feet (15 m) AMSL
Runways
Direction	Length and surface
07/25	1,600 yards (1,463 m) x 50 yards (46 m)
00/18	1,300 yards (1,189 m) x 50 yards (46 m)
- Source: Royal Navy Research Archive

Royal Naval Air Station Maydown (RNAS Maydown; or HMS Shrike, later HMS Gannet II) is a former Royal Navy Fleet Air Arm airbase located 4.3 miles (6.9 km) northeast of Derry, County Londonderry and 11.4 miles (18.3 km) west of Limavady, County Londonderry, Northern Ireland.

The airfield was transferred from the Royal Air Force on 1 May 1943 and the airbase was commissioned on 1 January 1944 as HMS Shrike. On 31 September 1945 it was 'paid off' and was immediately recommissioned as HMS Gannet II and served as a satellite airfield to RNAS Eglinton.

== Units ==
A number of units were here at some point:

- 744 Naval Air Squadron
- 794 Naval Air Squadron
- 804 Naval Air Squadron
- 813 Naval Air Squadron
- 816 Naval Air Squadron
- 819 Naval Air Squadron
- 821 Naval Air Squadron
- 822 Naval Air Squadron
- 824 Naval Air Squadron
- 825 Naval Air Squadron
- 831 Naval Air Squadron
- 832 Naval Air Squadron
- 833 Naval Air Squadron
- 836 Naval Air Squadron
- 838 Naval Air Squadron
- 840 Naval Air Squadron
- 842 Naval Air Squadron
- 845 Naval Air Squadron
- 846 Naval Air Squadron
- 848 Naval Air Squadron
- 849 Naval Air Squadron
- 850 Naval Air Squadron
- 852 Naval Air Squadron
- 853 Naval Air Squadron
- 856 Naval Air Squadron
- 860 Naval Air Squadron
- 1834 Naval Air Squadron
- 2nd Fighter Squadron
- 7th Fighter Squadron
- No. 2754 Squadron RAF Regiment
- No. 2756 Squadron RAF Regiment
- No. 2836 Squadron RAF Regiment
- Combined Anti-Submarine Tactical School RAF

== Current use ==
The site is currently used by industry.

== See also ==
- List of air stations of the Royal Navy
