= MV Empire MacAlpine =

World War II merchant ship of the United Kingdom

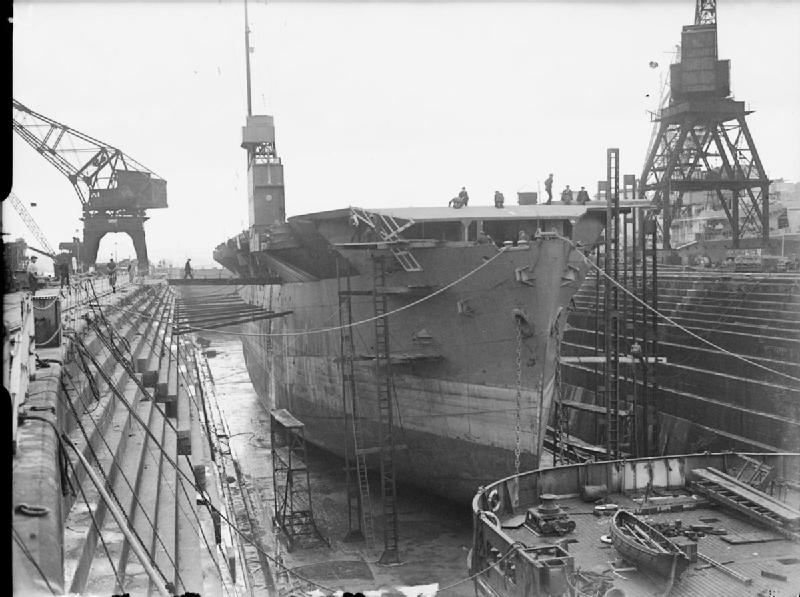
- MV Empire MacAlpine in dry dock at Messrs Cammell Lairds at Birkenhead.

History

United Kingdom
- Name: Empire MacAlpine
- Owner: Ministry of War Transport
- Builder: Burntisland Shipbuilding Company, Fife, Scotland
- Laid down: 11 August 1942
- Launched: 23 December 1942
- Renamed: Derrynan in 1951; Huntsbrook in 1959; Suva Breeze in 1960; Djatingaleh in 1965; San Ernesto in 1966; Pacific Endeavour in 1968
- Honours and awards: Atlantic (1943–45)
- Fate: Scrapped Hong Kong 1970

General characteristics
- Tonnage: 7,950 GRT
- Length: 412 ft 6 in (125.73 m) (p.p.) 433 ft 9 in (132.21 m) (o/a)
- Beam: 56 ft 9 in (17.30 m)
- Depth: 24 ft 6 in (7.47 m)
- Installed power: 3,300 hp (2,500 kW)
- Propulsion: Diesel engine(s); 1 × shaft
- Speed: 12.5 kn (23.2 km/h)
- Complement: 107
- Armament: 1 × 4 in (100 mm) dual-purpose gun, 2 × 40 mm anti-aircraft guns, 4 × 20 mm anti-aircraft cannons
- Aircraft carried: 4

MV Empire MacAlpine was a grain ship converted to become the first Merchant Aircraft Carrier (MAC ship).

The Burntisland Shipbuilding Company, Fife, Scotland, built her under order from the Ministry of War Transport and was delivered on 14 April 1943. As a MAC ship, only her air crew and the necessary maintenance staff were naval personnel. She was operated by William Thomson & Co (the Ben Line).

After the war she was converted to a grain carrier. She was scrapped in Hong Kong in 1970.
