= Empire MacAndrew =

World War II merchant ship of the United Kingdom

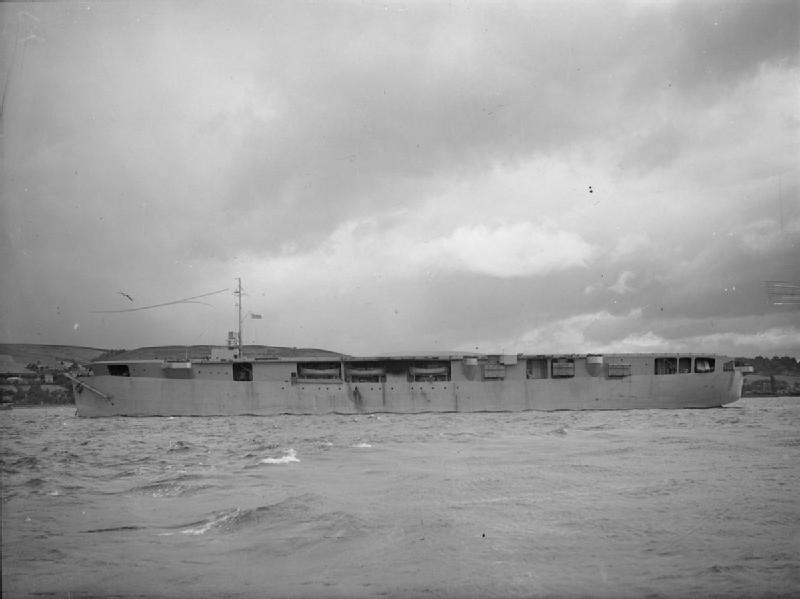
- Empire MacAndrew.

History

United Kingdom
- Name: Empire MacAndrew
- Owner: Ministry of War Transport
- Operator: Hain SS Co, St.Ives
- Builder: William Denny & Brothers Dumbarton Scotland
- Launched: 3 May 1943
- Renamed: Derryheen in 1947; Cape Grafton in 1951; Patricia in 1963
- Fate: Scrapped China 1970

General characteristics
- Tonnage: 7,950 GRT
- Length: 425 ft (130 m) (pp) 445 ft 9 in (135.86 m) (oa)
- Beam: 56 ft (17 m)
- Depth: 24 ft 9 in (7.54 m)
- Propulsion: Diesel; one shaft; 3,300 bhp
- Speed: 12.5 knots (23.2 km/h)
- Complement: 107
- Armament: 1 × 4 in (100 mm); 2 × 40 mm; 4 × 20 mm
- Aircraft carried: Four Fairey Swordfish

Empire MacAndrew was a grain ship converted to become a Merchant Aircraft Carrier or MAC ship. After the war, the ship was converted back to a grain carrier, and eventually scrapped in China in 1970.
