= MV Empire MacKendrick =

World War II merchant ship of the United Kingdom

History

United Kingdom
- Name: Empire MacKendrick
- Owner: Ministry of War Transport
- Builder: Burntisland Shipbuilding Company Ltd, Fife, Scotland
- Laid down: 24 April 1943
- Launched: 29 September 1943
- Renamed: Granpond in 1946; Condor in 1949; Saltersgate in 1955; Vassil Levsky in 1957
- Fate: Scrapped Split 1975

General characteristics
- Tonnage: 7,950 GRT
- Length: 412.5 ft (125.7 m) (pp) 433.75 ft (132.21 m) (oa)
- Beam: 56.75 ft (17.30 m)
- Depth: 24 ft 6 in (7.47 m)
- Propulsion: Diesel; one shaft; 3,300 bhp
- Speed: 12.5 knots (23.2 km/h)
- Complement: 107
- Armament: 1 × 4 in (100 mm); 2 × 40 mm; 4 × 20 mm
- Aircraft carried: Four Fairey Swordfish

MV Empire MacKendrick was a Merchant Aircraft Carrier or MAC ship converted to become a grain ship.

The Burntisland Shipbuilding Company Ltd, Fife, Scotland, built her under order from the Ministry of War Transport and was delivered on 12 December 1943. As a MAC ship, only her air crew and the necessary maintenance staff were naval personnel. She was operated by William Thomson & Co (the Ben Line).

After the war the ship was converted to a grain carrier. In 1967, while under Bulgarian management, she was trapped in the Suez Canal by the Six-Day War. She was scrapped at Split in 1975.

== See also ==
- List of aircraft carriers
