= MV Empire MacDermott =

History

United Kingdom
- Name: Empire MacDermott
- Owner: Ministry of War Transport
- Operator: Hain Steamship Company, St Ives; Buries Markes Ltd, London from 1947; Canero Cia Nav. S. A., Panama from 1959; Southern Shipping & Enterprises, Hong Kong from 1969; China Ocean Shipping Co, Peking from 1975
- Builder: William Denny and Brothers, Dumbarton, Scotland
- Launched: 24 January 1944
- Commissioned: 31 March 1944
- Renamed: La Cumbre, 1948; (Greece) Parnon, 1959; (Somalia) Starlight, 1969
- Fate: Sold in 1991 and deleted

General characteristics
- Tonnage: 7,952 GRT
- Displacement: 12,000 tons (full load)
- Length: 448 ft (137 m)
- Beam: 60 ft (18 m)
- Depth: 24 ft 6 in (7.47 m)
- Propulsion: Diesel; one shaft; 3,300 bhp
- Speed: 12.5 knots (23.2 km/h)
- Complement: 107
- Armament: 1 × 4 in (100 mm); 2 × 40 mm; 4 × 20 mm
- Aircraft carried: Four Fairey Swordfish

MV Empire MacDermott was a bulk grain ship built as a Merchant Aircraft Carrier (MAC ship). She served with the British Merchant Navy during the Second World War, with rudimentary aircraft handling facilities operated by a Fleet Air Arm "air party".

Empire MacDermott was built by William Denny and Brothers, Dumbarton, Scotland. She spent most of her time on the Atlantic convoy routes, providing air cover and transporting desperately needed grain to the UK. After the end of the, she was handed over to Buries Markes Ltd, London in 1947 and returned to merchant service the following year under the name La Cumbre. She was sold on again in 1959, this time to Canero Cia Nav. S. A., Panama. They sailed her as Parnon under the Greek flag until 1969, when they sold her to Southern Shipping & Enterprises, Hong Kong. They renamed her Starlight, and sailed her under the Somali flag. She was then transferred to the China Ocean Shipping Co, Peking in 1975, and by 1991 she had been deleted from Lloyd's Register.
