= 860 Naval Air Squadron =

Netherlands Naval Aviation Service squadron

860 Naval Air Squadron VSQ-860
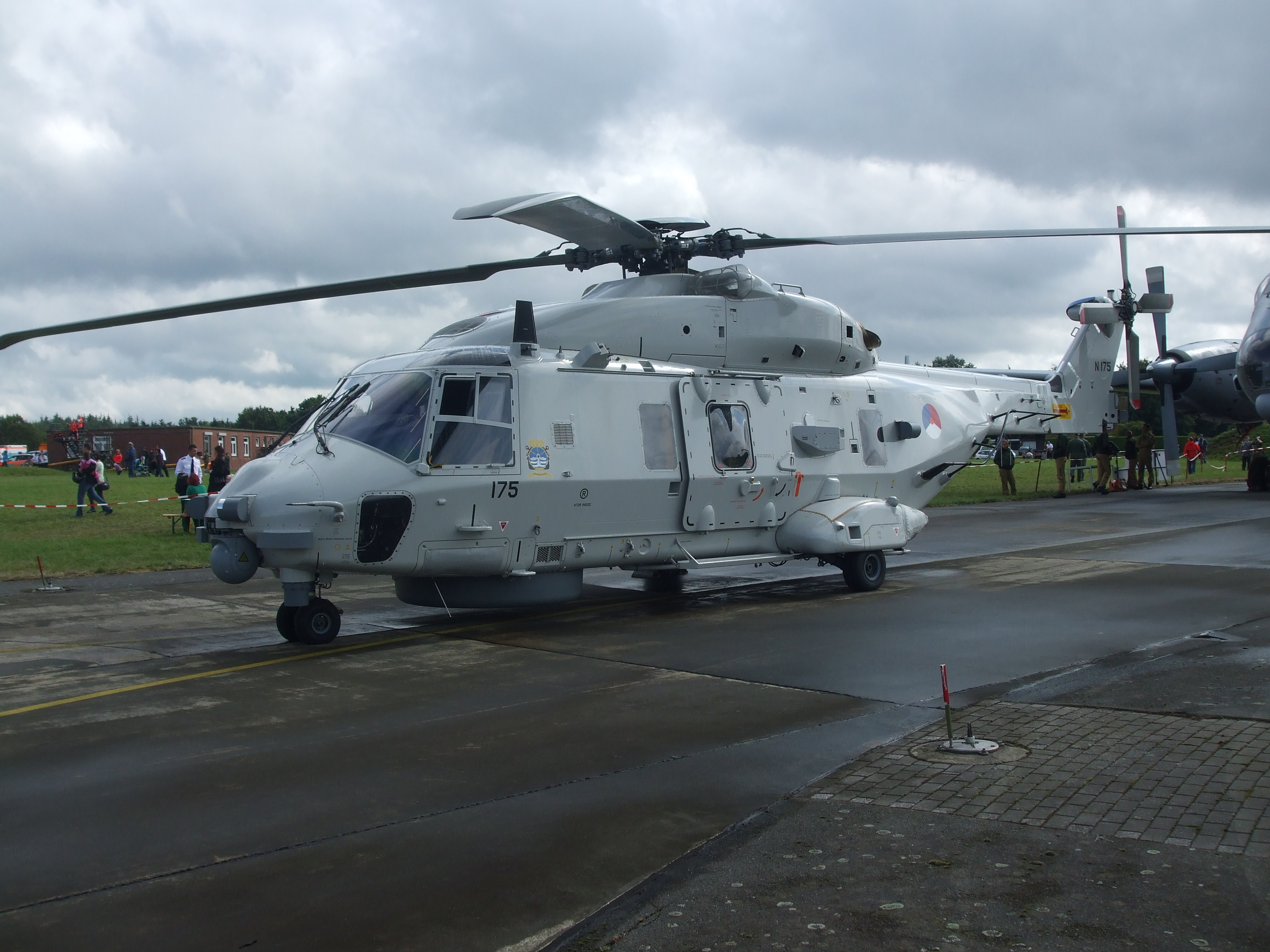
- NH90 N-175 of 860 Squadron, August 2013
- Active: 1943–1964; 1966–present
- Country: United Kingdom; Netherlands
- Branch: Royal Navy; Royal Netherlands Navy
- Part of: Fleet Air Arm; Naval Aviation Service
- Garrison/HQ: Naval Air Station De Kooy
- Mottos: Arcens affligo (Latin: "I defend and strike")
- Engagements: World War II; Indonesian War of Independence
- Battle honours: Atlantic 1941-45

860 Naval Air Squadron (860 NAS) was a Naval Air Squadron of the Royal Navy's Fleet Air Arm during World War II, which was transferred to the Royal Netherlands Navy in 1946, and remains active.

== In British service ==
860 Squadron was formed in June 1943 at RNAS Donibristle, Scotland, from personnel of the Royal Netherlands Navy, under the command of Luitenant J. van der Tooren. As a torpedo-bomber/reconnaissance squadron, flying the Fairey Swordfish, the squadron moved to Maydown, Northern Ireland, in November 1943. There it was divided into two flights of six aircraft to operate from the merchant aircraft carriers MV Acavus and MV Gadila, and then from Acavus and MV Macoma from June 1944. In June 1945 the squadron was re-equipped with the Fairey Barracuda, and in August it was assigned to the escort carrier HMS Nairana.

In May 1946 the squadron converted to the Fairey Firefly, and in September 1946 was handed over to Dutch control, becoming part of the Netherlands Naval Aviation Service.

== In Dutch service ==
Assigned to the former Nairana, now renamed HNLMS Karel Doorman (QH1), it took part in operations in Java during the Indonesian War of Independence. It operated the Hawker Sea Fury from 1950 until 1956, then the Hawker Sea Hawk from 1957, while based at Valkenburg Naval Air Base, and flying from the second HNLMS Karel Doorman (R81). Disbanded in 1964, it was reformed in October 1966 as an ASW/SAR helicopter squadron operating from Naval Air Station De Kooy and the Van Speijk-class frigates. Equipped with the Westland Wasp, then the Westland Lynx from 1978, in early 2008 it converted to the NHIndustries NH90, and in July that year became part of the joint military Defence Helicopter Command.
