= SS Honolulan =

SS Honolulan may refer to one of three cargo ships of the American-Hawaiian Steamship Company:

- SS Honolulan (1900) the former SS American renamed Honolulan in 1925; served as USS American (ID-2292) during World War I; sank USS West Gate (ID-3216) in a collision in October 1918; scrapped in Japan, 1926
- SS Honolulan (1910), served American-Hawaiian from 1910 to 1916; later named Thorvald Halvorsen (1916), Argentina (1921), and Jacob Luckenbach (1922); wrecked off coast of Costa Rica in May 1927; scrapped at Baltimore, Maryland, in August 1927
- SS Honolulan (1921), the former West Faralon and Golden Hind (1928) renamed Honolulan in 1937; sunk by U-582 in July 1942
