= MV Focomar =

A number of motor vessels have been named Focomar, including –

- MV Focomar (1945), a coaster in service 1972–74. Ran aground on Andros Island, Greece and sank
- MV Focomar (2011), a bulker in service 2011–15. Sank in the Gulf of Aden
