= List of Empire ships (M) =

== Suffix beginning with M ==
=== Empire MacAlpine ===
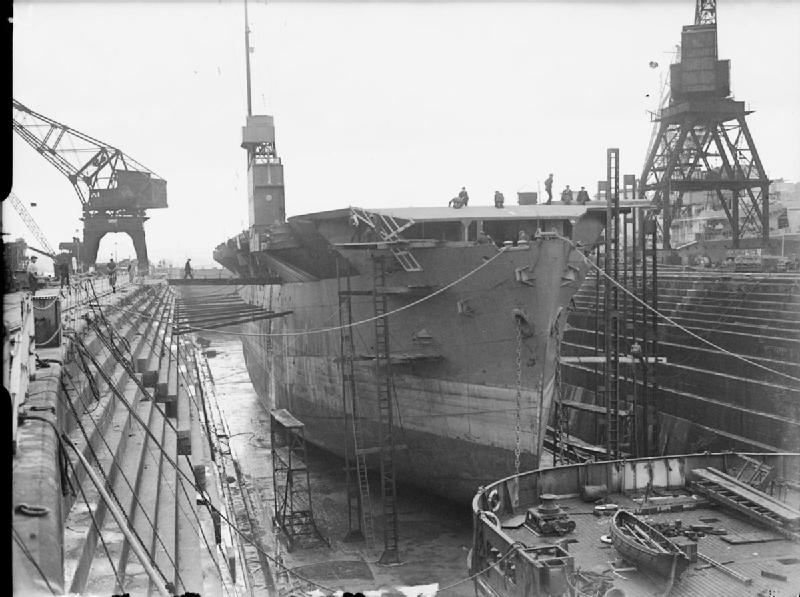
Empire MacAlpine in drydock.

Empire MacAlpine was a 7,954 GRT Merchant Aircraft Carrier (MAC) cargo ship which was built by Burntisland Shipbuilding Company Ltd, Fife. Launched on 23 December 1942 and completed in April 1943. On 1 July 1943, Empire MacAlpine was in collision with Empire Ibex in the north Atlantic (53°30′N 36°25′W) and her bow was badly damaged. Empire Ibex was abandoned on 2 July and sank. Sold in 1947 to McCowan & Gross Ltd, London and renamed Derrynane. Sold in 1951 to Power Steamship Co Ltd and renamed Huntsbrook. Operated under the management of O Gross & Sons Ltd, London. Sold in 1959 to South Breeze Navigation Co Ltd and renamed Suva Breeze. Operated under the management of J Manners & Co Ltd, Hong Kong. Sold in 1965 to San Fernando Steamship Co, Hong Kong and renamed Djatingaleh, remaining under Manners' management and renamed San Ernesto in 1966. Renamed Pacific Endeavour and placed under the management of Jaguar Shipping Corp Ltd, Hong Kong in 1968. Sold in 1969 to Compagnia Nueve del Oriente SA, Panama, remaining under Jaguar's management. Arrived on 21 February in Hong Kong for scrapping.

=== Empire MacAndrew ===
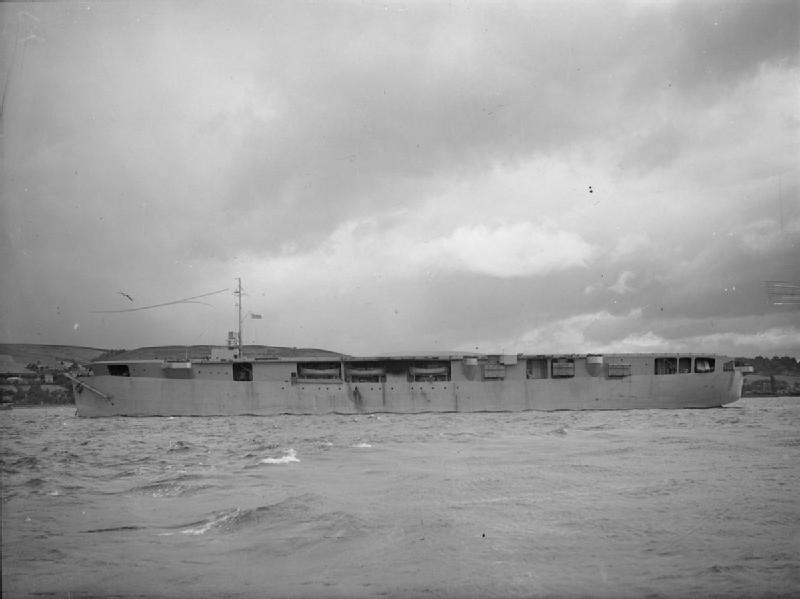
Empire MacAndrew

Empire MacAndrew was a 7,952 GRT MAC cargo ship which was built by William Denny & Bros Ltd, Dumbarton. Launched on 3 May 1943 and completed in July 1943. Sold in 1947 to McCowan & Gross Ltd, London and renamed Derryheen. Sold in 1951 to Cape of Good Hope Motor Ship Co Ltd and renamed Cape Grafton. Operated under the management of Lyle Shipping Co Ltd, Glasgow. Sold in 1963 to Patricia Compagnia Navigazione SA, Liberia and renamed Patricia. Sold in 1968 to Pomos Shipping Co Ltd, Cyprus, operated under the management of Chios Navigation Co Ltd, London. Scrapped in October 1970 at Hsingkiang, China.

=== Empire MacCabe ===
Empire MacCabe was a 9,249 GRT MAC tanker which was built by Swan, Hunter & Wigham Richardson Ltd, Newcastle upon Tyne. Launched on 18 May 1943 and completed in November 1943. Sold in 1946 to British Tanker Co Ltd and renamed British Escort. Sold in 1960 to River Line Ltd, Bermuda and renamed Easthill Escort. Operated under the management of Mollers Ltd, Hong Kong. Scrapped in 1962 in Hong Kong.

=== Empire MacCallum ===
Empire MacCallum was an 8,252 GRT MAC cargo ship which was built by Lithgows Ltd, Port Glasgow. Launched on 12 October 1943 and completed in December 1943. Sold in 1947 to Doris Steamship Co Ltd and renamed Doris Clunies. Operated under the management of Olsen, Johnston & Co Ltd, Glasgow. Renamed Sunrover in 1951, placed under the management of Dracoulis Ltd, London in 1953. Renamed Eudoxia in 1957. Sold in 1959 to Phorkyss Shipping Corporation, Panama and renamed Phorkyss. Operated under the management of H C Dracoulis, Greece. Scrapped in November 1960 in Osaka, Japan.

=== Empire MacColl ===
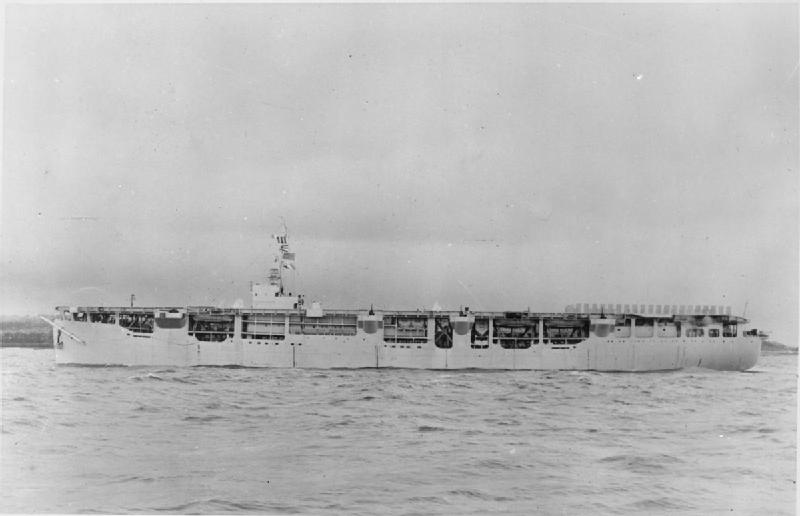
Empire MacColl

Empire MacColl was a 9,133 GRT MAC tanker which was built by Cammell Laird & Co Ltd, Birkenhead. Launched on 21 July 1943 and completed in November 1943. Sold in 1946 to British Tanker Co Ltd and renamed British Pilot. Arrived on 21 August 1962 at Faslane for scrapping.

=== Empire MacDermott ===
Empire MacDermott was a 7,952 GRT MAC cargo ship which was built by William Denny & Bros Ltd, Dumbarton. Launched on 24 January 1944 and completed in March 1944. Sold in 1948 to Buries, Markes Ltd, London and renamed La Cumbre. Sold in 1959 to Canero Compagnia Navigazione SA, Panama and renamed Parnon. Operated under the management of Lyras Bros Ltd, London. Sold in 1969 to Southern Shipping & Enterprises Co Ltd and renamed Starlight. Operated under the management of Yick Fung Shipping & Enterprises, Hong Kong. Sold in 1976 to the Government of the People's Republic of China.

=== Empire Mace ===
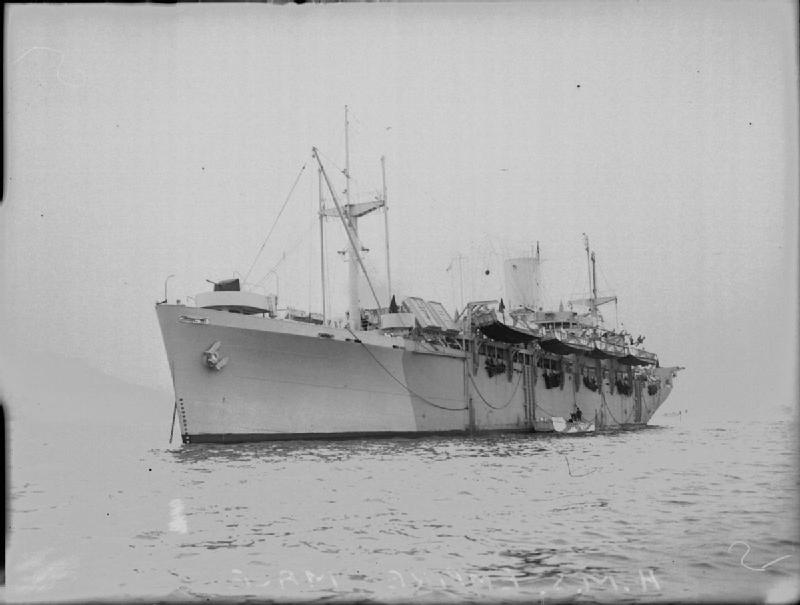
Empire Mace

Empire Mace was a 7,177 GRT (11,650 tons displacement) cargo ship which was built by Consolidated Steel Corporation, Wilmington, California. Laid down as Cape St Roque and completed in December 1943 as Empire Mace for MoWT. Transferred to the Royal Navy in 1944 as HMS Galtee More. Sold in 1957 to Société Misr de Navigation Maritime, Egypt and renamed Misr. To the Egyptian Government in 1959.

=== Empire MacKay ===
Empire MacKay was an 8,908 GRT MAC tanker which was built by Harland & Wolff Ltd, Govan. Laid down as British Wisdom and launched on 17 June 1943 as Empire Mackay. Completed in October 1943. Sold in 1946 to British Tanker Co Ltd and renamed British Swordfish. Arrived on 21 May 1959 at Rotterdam, Netherlands for scrapping.

=== Empire MacKendrick ===
Empire MacKendrick was a 7,933 GRT MAC cargo ship which was built by Burntisland Shipbuilding Co Ltd, Burntisland. Launched on 29 September 1943 and completed in December 1943. Sold in 1947 to Mediterranean & Atlantic Lines Ltd and renamed Granpond. Operated under the management of Goulandris Bros Ltd, London. Sold in 1951 to Compagnia Maritima de Este SA, Panama and renamed Condor. Operated under the management of Goulandris Bros Ltd, Greece. Sold in 1955 to Turnbull, Scott Shipping Co Ltd, London and renamed Saltersgate. Sold in 1957 to Navigation Bulgare Maritime and renamed Vassil Levsky. On 6 June 1967 she was detained in the Great Bitter Lake due to the Arab–Israeli conflict. Released on 5 June 1975 when the Suez Canal was reopened to traffic. Arrived under tow on 22 July 1975 at Split, Yugoslavia for scrapping.

=== Empire MacKenzie ===
Empire Mackenzie was to have been a MAC ship, but the contract for building her was cancelled after the name had been allocated.

=== Empire MacMahon ===
Empire MacMahon was an 8,856 GRT MAC tanker which was built by Swan, Hunter & Wigham Richardson Ltd, Wallsend. Launched on 2 July 1943 and completed in December 1943. Sold in 1946 to Anglo-Saxon Petroleum Co Ltd and renamed Naninia. Arrived on 17 March 1960 at Hong Kong for scrapping.

=== Empire MacRae ===
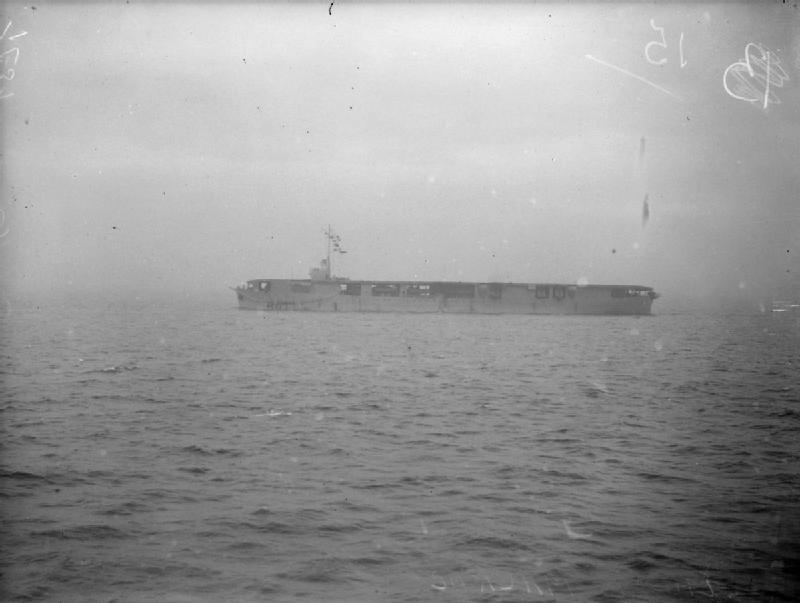
Empire MacRae

Empire MacRae was an 8,252 GRT MAC cargo ship which was built by Lithgows Ltd, Port Glasgow. Launched on 21 June 1943 and completed in September 1943. Sold in 1947 to Alpha South African Steamship Co and renamed Alpha Zambesi. Operated under the management of Mollers Ltd, London. Sold in 1949 to Motor Lines Ltd, operated under the management of Olsen, Johnston & Co Ltd, Glasgow. Sold in 1954 to V Torkildsen, Norway and renamed Tobon. Sold in 1964 to W Kubon, Norway. Sold in 1967 to Aghia Paraskevi Corporation, Greece and renamed Despina. Operated under the management of Pontikos Shipping Agencies Ltd, London. Scrapped in April 1971 at Kaohsiung, Taiwan.

=== Empire MacSorley ===
Empire MacSorely was to have been a MAC ship, but the contract for building her was cancelled after the name had been allocated.

=== Empire Madge ===
Empire Madge was a 258 GRT tug which was built by Scott & Sons, Bowling, West Dunbartonshire. Launched on 30 April 1945 and completed in June 1945. To the Admiralty in 1947 and renamed Weasel. Scrapped in November 1968 at Singapore.

=== Empire Magpie ===
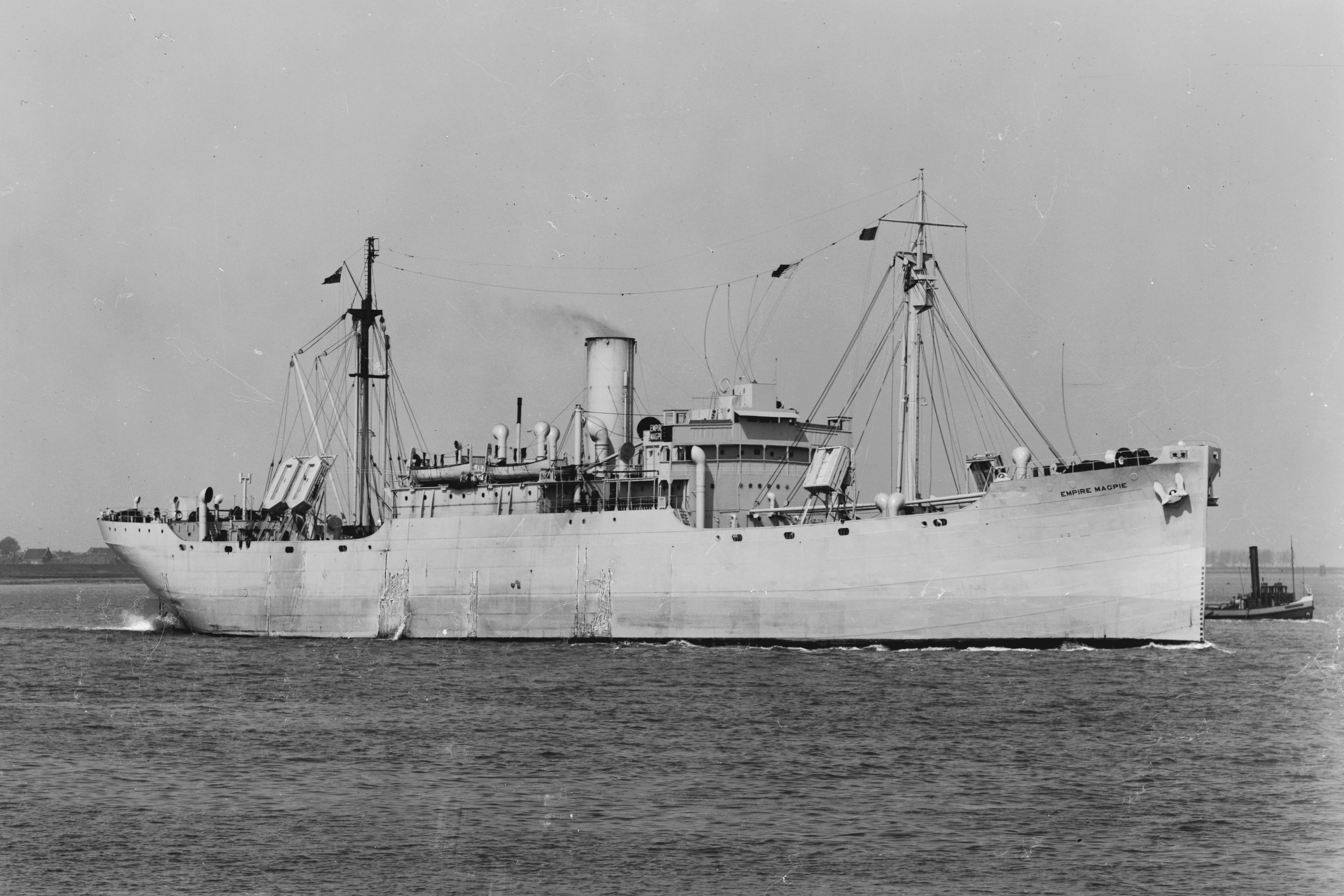
Empire Magpie

Empire Magpie was a 6,211 GRT cargo ship built in 1919 by Federal Shipbuilding and Drydock Company, Kearny, New Jersey. Completed as Bellemina for the United States Shipping Board (USSB). To MoWT in 1941 and renamed Empire Magpie. Sold in 1946 to Williamson & Co, Hong Kong. Sold in 1948 to Yui Kong, China and renamed Jui Hsin. Sold in 1950 to Pacific Union Marine, Panama and renamed Atlantic Unity. Scrapped in April 1959 at Hirao, Japan.

=== Empire Mahseer ===
Empire Mahseer was a 5,107 GRT (7,500 DWT) cargo ship which was built by American International Shipbuilding Co, Hog Island, Pennsylvania. Completed in 1920 as Liberty Bell for the USSB. To Pioneer Steamship Corp, New York in 1920, returned to USSB in 1921. To Lykes Brothers-Ripley Steamship Co Inc in 1933 then to MoWT in 1940 and renamed Empire Mahseer. Torpedoed on 4 March 1943 and sunk by U-160 at 32°01′S 30°48′E.

=== Empire Maiden ===
Empire Maiden was an 813 GRT coaster which was built by A & J Inglis Ltd, Glasgow. Launched on 20 December 1941 and completed in March 1942. Bombed on 14 June 1943 and sunk at Pantelleria, Italy. The wreck was sold in 1947 to Italian buyers, raised and towed to Messina, arriving on 5 July 1948. Repaired, with a new steam engine being fitted. Sold to G Dagnino, Italy. Sold in 1953 to Astrolea Società Anonima, Italy and renamed Asteria. Sold in 1958 to Lugari & Filippi, Italy and renamed Sanjacopo. New diesel engine fitted in 1962. Sold in 1968 to Società Anonima di Navigazione, Italy. Sold in 1972 to Lidia Melodia Ved. Lugari, Italy. Scrapped in July 1974 at Spezia, Italy.

=== Empire Maisie ===
Empire Maisie was a 244 GRT tug which was built by Henry Scarr Ltd, Hessle. Launched on 23 May 1943 and completed in July 1943. Sold in 1947 to Clyde Shipping Co Ltd and renamed Flying Typhoon. Sold in 1961 to Newport Screw Towing Co Ltd and renamed Dunhawk. Scrapped in 1969 at Newport Monmouthshire.

=== Empire Malacca ===
Empire Malacca was a 7,071 GRT cargo ship which was built by William Gray & Co Ltd, West Hartlepool. Launched on 10 June 1944 and completed in August 1944. Sold in 1946 to T & J Brocklebank Ltd and renamed Mandasor. Sold in 1962 to Tsavliris Shipping Ltd, London and renamed Fotini Tsavliris. Sold in 1963 to Kantara Shipping Ltd, Cyprus. Operated under the management of Tsavliris Shipping Ltd, London. Sold in 1969 to Free Trader Shipping Ltd, Cyprus. Remained under Tsavliris's management. Ran aground on 16 September 1970 4 nautical miles (7.4 km) off Terschelling lighthouse (53°25′N 05°00′E). Refloated on 18 September and towed to Amsterdam. Departed Amsterdam on 29 September 1970 in tow of tug Nisos Zakynthos bound for Piraeus, Greece. Laid up on arrival. Arrived on 1 May 1972 at Derince, Turkey for scrapping.

=== Empire Maldon ===
Empire Maldon was a 3,750 GRT tanker which was built by Sir J Laing & Sons Ltd, Sunderland. Launched on 19 November 1945 and completed in April 1946. Sold in 1946 to Imperial Oil Co Ltd, Canada and renamed Imperial Halifax. Sold in 1970 to Johnston Shipping Ltd, Canada and renamed Congar. Scrapped in November 1977 at Hamilton, Ontario.

=== Empire Mallard ===
Empire Mallard was a 4,957 GRT (7,500 DWT) cargo ship which was built by Todd Drydock and Construction Company, Tacoma, Washington. Ordered as War Comrade for the British Shipping Controller, London and completed as Anacortes for the USSB. To French American Lin in 1920, returning to USSB later that year. To MoWT in 1941 and renamed Empire Mallard. Collided on 26 September 1941 with Empire Moon and sank near Point Armour, Strait of Belle Isle.

=== Empire Mallory ===
Empire Mallore was a 6,327 GRT cargo ship which was built by C Connell & Co Ltd, Glasgow. Launched on 9 July 1941 and completed in August 1941. Sold in 1946 to C Cravos & Co, Cardiff and renamed Ampleforth. On 23 January 1947 she dragged her anchors and ran aground at Tel Aviv, Palestine. Refloated on 3 March and arrived under tow on 10 March at Alexandria, Egypt. Declared a constructive total loss and sold. Towed to Genoa then Palermo, where she arrived on 6 November 1947. Repaired and sold in 1948 to Irish Bay Lines Ltd and renamed Bangor Bay. Operated under the management of H P Lenaghan & Sons Ltd, Belfast. Sold in 1954 to Great Eastern Shipping Co Ltd, Bombay and renamed Jag Shanti. Arrived on 9 September 1961 at Bombay for scrapping.

=== Empire Malta ===
Empire Malta was a 3,539 GRT (4,310 DWT) cargo ship which was built by William Gray & Co Ltd, West Hartlepool. Launched on 24 March 1944 and completed in May 1944. Sold in 1946 to Williamson & Co, Hong Kong, then later that year to Indo-China Steam Navigation Co Ltd, London and renamed Hangsang. Sold in 1960 to Continental Navigation & Enterprises Ltd, Hong Kong and renamed Slight Wind. Sold in 1964 to Sunbeam Navigation Co Ltd, Panama and renamed Sunbeam. Operated under the management of Patt, Mansfield & Co Ltd, Hong Kong. On 23 July 1969 she suffered a major engine breakdown in the South China Sea and was towed to Kaohsiung, Taiwan. Scrapped in November 1970 at Kaohsiung.

=== Empire Mammoth ===
Empire Mammoth was a 938 GRT bucket dredger which was built by Fleming & Ferguson Ltd, Paisley. Launched on 6 July 1945 and completed in November 1945. To the Admiralty in 1946 and renamed st Ives. To Ministry of Public Building and Works in 1963 and renamed Bucket Dredger W 2. Sold c1970 to H G Pounds, Portsmouth. Renamed St Ives, sold in 1972 to an Italian buyer. On 27 December 1972, St Ives capsized in bad weather north-west of Ferrol, Spain while under tow by tug Smit Pioneer and sank at 44°21′N 08°57′W.

=== Empire Mandalay ===
Empire Mandalay was a 7,086 GRT cargo ship which was built by Shipbuilding Corporation Ltd, Sunderland. Launched on 29 October 1944 and completed in December 1944. Sold in 1946 to T & J Harrison and renamed Tribesman. Sold in 1961 to Margalante Compagnia Navigazione, Panama and renamed Delta. Sold later that year to Sigma Shipping Co Ltd. Scrapped in December 1961 in Hong Kong.

=== Empire Mandarin ===
Empire Mandarin was a 7,078 GRT cargo ship which was built by Shipbuilding Corporation Ltd, Newcastle upon Tyne. Launched on 9 March 1944 and completed in May 1944. Sold in 1947 to Dorset Steamship Co Ltd and renamed Lulworth Hill. Operated under the management of Counties Ship Management Ltd. Renamed Castle Hill in 1949. Sold in 1950 to London & Overseas Freighters Ltd and renamed London Builder. Sold later that year to Societa Armadora Insular Sa, Panama and renamed Silver Wake. Sold in 1954 to Eastern Seas Steamship Co Ltd and renamed Navarino. Sold in 1955 to Stanthorpe Steamship Co Ltd and renamed Stanthorpe. Operated under the management of J A Billmeir & Co Ltd. Sold in 1961 to Mullion & Co Ltd, Hong Kong and renamed Ardbrae. Arrived on 1 March 1966 at Onomichi, Japan for scrapping.

=== Empire Manor ===
Empire Manor was a 7,036 GRT cargo ship which was built by Short Brothers Ltd, Sunderland. Launched on 8 April 1943 and completed in July 1943. Hit amidships on 27 January 1944 with Liberty ship Edward Kavanagh and holed. Taken in tow but the following day a fire developed when chemical cargo reacted with seawater. Empire Manor was abandoned and she broke in two the following day, with the stern section sinking. Bow section sunk by depth charges from HMCS Kenogami. After she had been sunk, a coded message was passed that Empire Manor was carrying gold bullion. Wreck located in 1953 at 43°53′N 53°04′W by salvage vessel Twyford of Risdon Beazley Marine Salvage Co Ltd, Southampton. In September 1973, the bullion was salvaged by salvage vessel Droxford. It was landed at Town Quay, Southampton in November 1973 and taken under escort to the Bank of England, London.

=== Empire Maple ===
Empire Maple was a 129 GRT tug which was built by R Dunston Ltd, Thorne. Launched on 20 May 1941 and completed in September 1941. Allocated in 1947 to the Government of Poland and renamed Tarpan. Deleted from shipping registers in 1962, allocated to port work only but possibly scrapped about this time.

=== Empire March ===
Empire March was a 7,090 GRT cargo ship which was built by Vickers-Armstrongs Ltd, Barrow in Furness. Launched on 20 February 1942 and completed in April 1942. Attacked on 1 January 1943 and sunk by torpedoes and gunfire from the German raider Michel in the South Atlantic.

=== Empire Margaret ===
Empire Margaret was a 235 GRT tug which was built by A Hall & Co Ltd, Aberdeen. Laid down as Empire Margaret and launched on 16 June 1946 as Sun XVII. Completed in November 1946 for W H J Alexander Ltd. Sold in 1968 to Società Rim. Napoletani, Italy and renamed Rania G. Scrapped in June 1983 in Palermo, Italy.

=== Empire Mariner ===
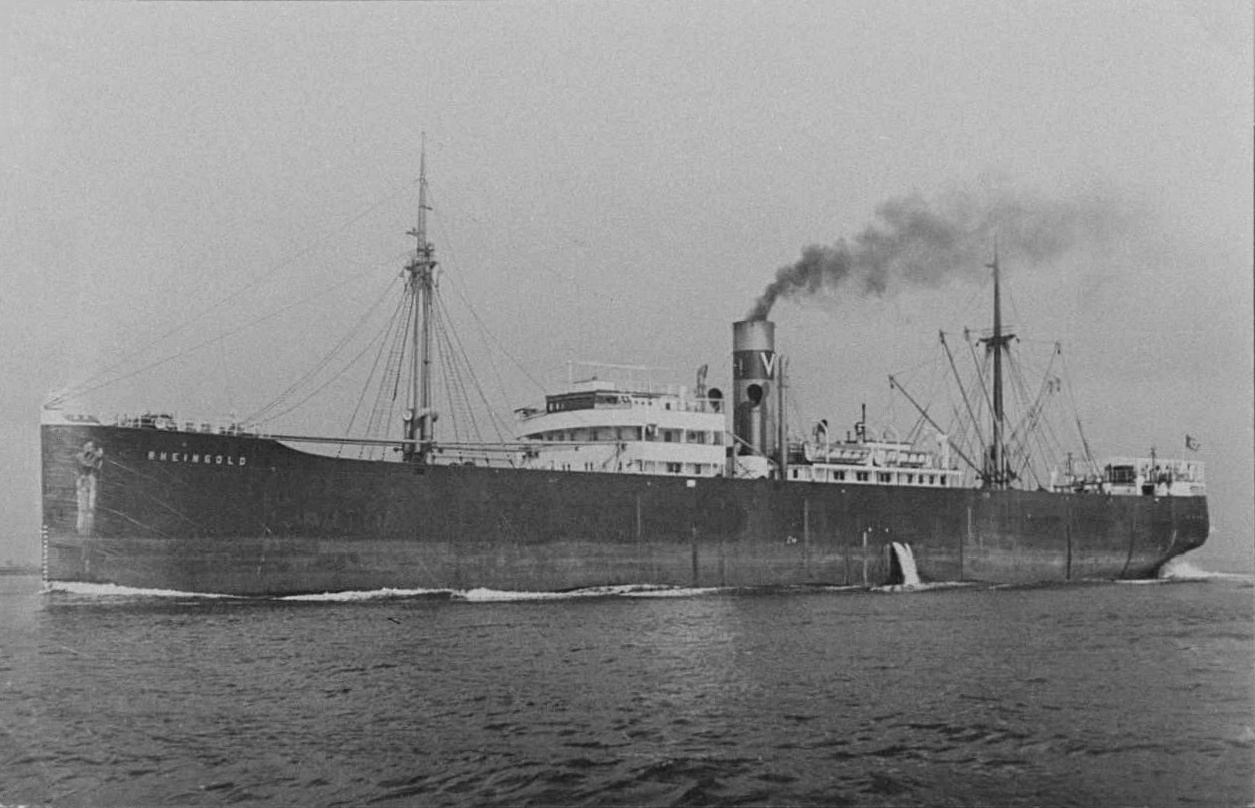
Rheingold, later Empire Mariner

Empire Mariner was a 4,957 GRT cargo ship which was built by Deutsche Werft, Hamburg. Launched in 1922 as Schwarzwald. Sold in 1935 to H Vogemann, Hamburg and renamed Rheingold. Sailed in October 1939 from Bahia, Brazil in an attempt to return to Germany but was captured on 25 October by Delhi and escorted to Kirkwall then Glasgow. To Ministry of Shipping and renamed Empire Mariner. On 26 July 1943 she put into the Clyde with engine damage. A new steam engine and boilers were fitted before she was sold in 1946 to the South American Saint Line Ltd and renamed St Ina. Sold in 1948 to Bristol City Line and renamed Wells City. Sold in 1951 to East & West Steamship Company, Karachi and renamed Fausta. Scrapped in October 1963 in Karachi.

=== Empire Mariott ===
Empire Mariott was a 5,970 GRT cargo ship which was built by William Pickersgill & Sons Ltd, Sunderland. Launched on 25 August 1941 and completed in October 1941. Sold in 1946 to I Williams & Co Ltd, Cardiff and renamed Graigdale. Sold in 1962 to New Dholera Steamships Ltd, India and renamed Jayshoor. Scrapped in September 1969 in Bombay.

=== Empire Marksman ===
Empire Marksman was a 965 GRT (1,100 DWT) coaster which was built by Scott & Sons, Bowling, West Dunbartonshire. Launched on 26 January 1944 and completed in March 1944. Sold in 1948 to Afon Lliedi Steamship Co and renamed Afon Morlais. Operated under the management of William Coombs & Sons, Llanelli. Sold in 1956 to John S Monks Ltd, Liverpool and renamed Cliffville. On 12 May 1958, she developed a leak, heeled over and sank at Meadowside Granary Wharf, Glasgow. Refloated on 14 July 1958 and sent to drydock where she was declared a constructive total loss. Scrapped in Dublin.

=== Empire Marlowe ===
Empire Marlowe was a 6,768 GRT cargo ship which was built by William Gray & Co Ltd, West Hartlepool. Launched on 6 October 1941 and completed in December 1941. Sold in 1946 to Sun Shipping Co Ltd and renamed Cape St David. Operated under the management of Mitchell, Cotts & Co Ltd. Sold in 1960 to Escort Shipping Co Ltd and renamed Happy Seafarer. Operated under the management of Mariner Shipping Co Ltd, Hong Kong. Scrapped in July 1966 at Hirao, Japan.

=== Empire Mars ===
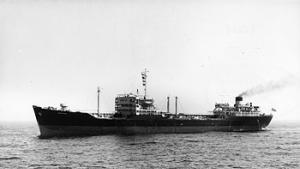
RFA Wave Duke

Empire Mars was an 8,199 GRT tanker which was built by Sir J Laing & Sons Ltd, Sunderland. To the Royal Fleet Auxiliary in 1946 and renamed RFA Wave Duke. Arrived in tow on 25 December 1969 at Bilbao, Spain for scrapping.

=== Empire Marshal ===
Empire Marshal was a 7,836 GRT heavy lift ship which was built by Greenock Dockyard Co Ltd, Greenock. Launched on 14 May 1945 and completed in November 1945. On her maiden voyage her cargoes consisted of nine TID tugs, ten lighters and a 100 feet (30 m) long oil separator, all bound for Hong Kong. Sold in 1947 to Pandelis Shipping Co Ltd, London. On 14 July 1952 she suffered an explosion in her engine room while at Pusan, South Korea. In August 1952 she was towed to Nagasaki, Japan and laid up as a constructive total loss. She was sold in 1954 and departed Nagasaki on 20 December 1954 under tow bound for Hong Kong. She was refitted by Taikoo Dockyard & Engineering Co, with a diesel engine from the MV Elax fitted. This engine had been fitted to the 1927 built Elax in 1946, Elax was then scrapped. Sold in 1955 to Trader Line Ltd, Bermuda and renamed Bermuda Trader. Operated under the management of Moller Line Ltd, Hong Kong. Ran aground on 9 March 1965 near Sakata, Japan. Broke in two on 14 March, a constructive total loss. One part was refloated in October 1965 and the other in September 1966; both were scrapped by Japanese shipbreakers.

=== Empire Marshland ===
Empire Marshland was a 683 GRT dredger which was built by William Simons & Co Ltd, Renfrew. Launched on 21 February 1946 and completed later that year. To the Admiralty and renamed W 30. Transferred in 1963 to the Ministry of Public Building and Works. Offered for sale in 1973 at Rosyth by the Board of Trade.

=== Empire Marston ===
Empire Marston was an 8,175 GRT tanker which was built by Furness Shipbuilding Co Ltd, Haverton Hill-on-Tees. Launched on 27 June 1946 as Empire Marston and completed in December 1946 as RFA Wave Pioneer. Arrived on 11 June 1960 at Inverkeithing, Fife for scrapping.

=== Empire Martaban ===
Empire Martaban was a 7,542 GRT cargo ship which was built by Burntisland Shipbuilding Co Ltd, Burntisland. Launched on 15 September 1944 and completed in November 1944. Sold in 1951 to Aviation & Shipping Co Ltd and renamed Avistone. Operated under the management of Purvis Shipping Co Ltd. Sold in 1960 to Faik Zeren, Turkey and renamed Turkiye. Scrapped in February 1972 at Istanbul.

=== Empire Martha ===
Empire Martha was a 292 GRT tug which was built by Cochrane & Sons Ltd, Selby. Launched on 28 April 1945 and completed in October 1945. Sold in 1947 to James Contracting & Shipping Co Ltd and renamed Foremost 106. Sold in 1949 to Union de Rem. et Sauv., Antwerp and renamed Georges Letzer. Fitted with a new diesel engine in 1964.

=== Empire Marvell ===
Empire Marvell was a 9,821 GRT tanker which was built by Sir J Laing & Sons Ltd, Sunderland. Launched on 17 January 1942 and completed in April 1942. Sold in 1946 to Northern Petroleum Tank Steamship Co Ltd and renamed Bloomfield. Operated under the management of Hunting & Son Ltd. Sold in 1955 to D B & E A Montanari, Italy and converted to a bulk carrier. Sold in 1959 to Pacific Ruler Corporation, Liberia and renamed Panaghia T. Operated under the management of Tsakalatos Navigation Corporation, New York. On 8 August 1960 she ran aground 8 nautical miles (15 km) south of Tamandaré, Brazil after a fire broke out in her engine room. She was refloated on 5 September and towed to Recife. She left Recife under tow on 31 August 1961 and arrived at Ymuiden, Netherlands on 7 October. Arrived on 19 December 1961 at Vigo, Spain for scrapping.

=== Empire Mary ===
Empire Mary was a 487 GRT tug which was built by Clelands (Successors) Ltd, Willington Quay-on-Tyne. Launched on 17 October 1944 as Empire Jean and completed in January 1945 as Empire Mary. Sold in 1946 to Overseas Towage & Salvage Co Ltd and renamed Marinia. Sold in 1950 to Union des Remorquage de Dakar and renamed W Ponty. Renamed Ponty in 1954. Sold in 1961 to Société Belge Remorquage Oceanique, Ostend, Belgium and renamed Ocean Bull. Sold in 1965 to SA Italiene Lavore e Maritimi, Italy and renamed Nettuno. Renamed Nettuno Sailem in 1984 and scrapped in May 1985 in Palermo, Italy.

=== Empire Mascot ===
Empire Mascot was a 244 GRT tug which was built by Henry Scarr Ltd, Hessle. Launched on 8 March 1943 and completed in May 1943. Sold in 1947 to Metal Industries Ltd and renamed Metinda IV. Sold in 1948 to Alexandra Towing Co Ltd and renamed Flying Kestrel. Scrapped in March 1969 at Passage West, Co Cork.

=== Empire Masefield ===
Empire Masefield was a 7,023 GRT cargo ship which was built by Swan, Hunter & Wigham Richardson Ltd, Newcastle upon Tyne. Launched on 26 August 1941 and completed in October 1941. Allocated to the Belgian Government in 1942 and renamed Belgian Seaman. Damaged on 13 January 1942 by enemy bombing off Yorkshire (54°22′N 00°19′W), later repaired. Sold in 1946 to Armement Deppe SA, Belgium and renamed Anvers. Sold in 1952 to Compagnie Belge d'Expansion Maritimes and renamed Clervaux. Sold in 1960 to M Angelos Ltd, London and renamed Mihalis Angelos. Sold in 1963 to Maradelanto Compagnia Navigazione, operated under the management of M Angelos Ltd. sold in 1965 to Celestial Shipping Corporation SA, Panama and renamed Gloria. Operated under the management of Gloria Shipping Ltd, Hong Kong. Arrived on 6 December 1967 at Kaohsiung, Taiwan for scrapping.

=== Empire Mauritius ===
Empire Mauritius was a 7,320 GRT cargo ship which was built by Bartram & Sons Ltd, Sunderland. Launched on 30 October 1944 and completed in February 1945. Sold in 1947 to Bury Hill Shipping Co Ltd and renamed Markab. Sold in 1956 to Motor Shipping Corporation of Seven Seas, Panama and renamed Matador. Sold in 1958 to J Manners Ltd, Hong Kong and renamed Yangtse Breeze. Sold in 1959 to the Chinese Government and renamed Hoping Wu Shi San. Renamed Ho Ping 53 c1979 and renamed Zhan Dou 53 c1985.

=== Empire Mavis ===
Empire Mavis was a 5,704 GRT (8,800 DWT) cargo ship which was built by Northwest Steel Co, Portland, Oregon. Completed in December 1918 as West Raritans for the USSB. To MoWT in 1941 and renamed Empire Mavis. Allocated to the Dutch Government in 1942 and renamed Jan van Goyen. Sold in 1946 to Halcyon Lijn NV, Netherlands and renamed Stad Maastricht. Sold in 1955 to Compagnia La Plana, Panama and renamed Amaver. Scrapped in January 1959 at Avilés, Spain.

=== Empire Maya ===
Empire Maya was a 394 coaster which was built by S P Austin & Sons Ltd, Sunderland. Launched on 27 March 1945 and completed in July 1945. Sold in 1947 to Straits Steamship Co Ltd and renamed Merliman. Sold in 1957 to A Gill & Co (Private) Ltd, India and renamed Margaret Rose was On 9 June 1959 she was hit by a tsunami off Okha Port and later capsized and sank off Dwarka.

=== Empire Maybury ===
Empire Maybury was a 394 GRT coaster which was built by Cook, Welton & Gemmell Ltd, Beverley. Launched on 10 July 1945 and completed in October 1945. Sold in 1948 to Ho Hong Steamship Co (1932) Ltd, Singapore and renamed Hong Ann. Sold in 1954 to Pacific Shipowners Ltd and renamed Ai Sokula. Operated under the management of W R Carpenter & Co Ltd, Australia. Sold in 1963 to Milne Bros, Marshall Islands and renamed Nei Raete II.

=== Empire Maydream ===
Empire Maydream was a 413 GRT coaster which was built by A Hall & Co Ltd, Aberdeen. Launched on 4 April 1946 as Empire Maydream and completed later that year as Maydream for Ta Hing (H K) Ltd, Hong Kong. Operated under the management of Mollers Ltd, Hong Kong. Renamed Wing Hing in 1947, now 563 GRT. sold in 1948 to Wallem & Co, Hong Kong. on 12 February 1950, she caught fire and was beached at Chilang Point, as a total loss. The wreck was reported as having been sold to a Chinese company on 9 June 1950.

=== Empire Mayflower ===
Empire Mayflower was a 394 GRT coaster which was built by Bartram & Sons Ltd, Sunderland. Launched on 16 May 1945 and completed in September 1945. Sold in 1946 to Straits Steamship Co Ltd, Hong Kong. Renamed Malim in 1947. sold in 1956 to Eastern Starlines Ltd, Ceylon. Renamed Starline Merchant in 1957. Scrapped in January 1962 in Bombay, India.

=== Empire Mayland ===
Empire Mayland was a 394 GRT coaster which was built by Charles Hill & Sons Ltd, Bristol. Launched in August 1945 and completed in February 1946. Sold in 1948 to Ho Hong Steamship Co (1932) Ltd, Singapore and renamed Hong Soon. Sold in 1952 to the Government of Portuguese Timor and renamed D Aleixo. Sold in 1965 to Tat Pin Shipping & Trading Co, Singapore. Removed from shipping registers in 1966.

=== Empire Maymead ===
Empire Maymead was a 394 GRT coaster which was built by Henry Scarr Ltd, Hessle. Launched in May 1945 and completed in November 1945. Sold in 1948 to Ho Hong Steamship Co (1932) Ltd, Singapore and renamed Hong Tat. Placed under the Chinese flag in 1955. Sold in 1957 to Hua Siang Steamship Co and renamed Hua Mui. Operated under the management of Chan Cheng Kum, Singapore. Sold in 1962 to Malayan Navigation Co Ltd, Singapore and renamed Hong Tat. Sold in 1965 to Madam Poonsri Sutharom, Thailand.

=== Empire Maymorn ===
Empire Maymorn was a 394 GRT coaster which was built by Charles Hill & Sons Ltd, Bristol. Launched on 31 December 1945 and completed in February 1946. Sold in 1947 to the Government of British Guiana and renamed Mazaruni. Transferred to the Government of Guyana when Guyana gained independence in 1966.

=== Empire Maymount ===
Empire Maymount was a 394 GRT coaster which was built by S P Austin & Sons Ltd, Sunderland. Launched on 12 April 1945 and completed in August 1945. Sold in 1947 to Straits Steamship Co Ltd and renamed Meluan. Sold in 1955 to A Gill & Sons (Private) Ltd, India and renamed Vir Pandian. On 28 July 1955, she ran aground at Gopinath, India. Declared a constructive total loss, sold and scrapped in situ.

=== Empire Mayport ===
Empire Mayport was a 394 GRT coaster which was built by Cook, Welton & Gemmell Ltd, Beverley. Launched in May 1945 and completed in September 1945. Sold in 1946 to Straits Steamship Co Ltd. Renamed Mentakab in 1947. Sold in 1953 to Cheong Steam Navigation Co and renamed Debora. Operated under the management of K S Pang, King Kong. Sold in 1954 to G Grimble & Co Ltd, Hong Kong and sold again later that year to Société Franco-Chinoise de Transports Maritime et Fluviaux, France. Now 554 GRT. Sold in 1960 to Malayan Navigation Co Ltd, Malaya. Sold in 1965 to Progress Shipping Co, Panama and renamed Bright Star. On 20 January 1966 she ran aground on a reef in the South China Sea 50 nautical miles (93 km) south-east of Da Nang, South Vietnam, (15°32′N 109°09′E) and wrecked.

=== Empire Mayring ===
Empire Mayring was a 394 GRT coaster which was built by Cochrane & Sons Ltd, Selby. Launched in August 1945 and completed in January 1946. Sold in 1947 to Ta Hing (H K) Ltd, Hong Kong and renamed Sing Hing. Now 565 GRT. Operated under the management of Mollers Ltd, Hong Kong. Sold in 1949 to Wallem & Co, Hong Kong. Sold in 1951 to Pakistan Steam Navigation Co Ltd, Pakistan and renamed Islamabad. Operated under the management of A K Khan & Co, Chittagong. To Bangladesh Steam Navigation Co Ltd, Bangladesh in 1972, remaining under Khan's management.

=== Empire Mayrose ===
Empire Mayrose was a 394 GRT coaster which was built by Bartram & Sons Ltd, Sunderland. Launched on 16 May 1945 and completed in August 1945. Sold in 1947 to Straits Steamship Co Ltd, Hong Kong and renamed Mawai. Sold in 1954 to Pacific Shipowners Ltd and renamed Meklong. Operated under the management of W R Carpenter & Co Ltd, Australia. Sold in 1957 to Lanena Shipping Co Ltd, Hong Kong. Operated under the management of T Engan, Philippines. Sold in 1960 to Tonglik Shipping Co Ltd and renamed Karang Djawa. Operated under the management of P T Garina Line, Indonesia.

=== Empire Mayrover ===
Empire Mayrover was a 394 GRT coaster which was built by Cochrane & Sons Ltd, Selby. Launched on 8 September 1945 and completed in May 1946. Sold in 1947 to Ta Hing (H K) Ltd, Hong Kong and renamed Wa Hing, now 558 GRT. Operated under the management of Mollers Ltd, Hong Kong. Sold in 1949 to Indian General Navigation & Railway Co Ltd, Calcutta and renamed Mumtaz. Sold in 1961 to Pakistan River Steamers Ltd, Pakistan. transferred in 1972 to Bangladesh River Steamers Ltd, Bangladesh. To the Bangladeshi Government in 1972 and renamed C5-203.

=== Empire Maysong ===
Empire Maysong was a 394 GRT coaster which was built by Scott & Sons Ltd, Bowling, West Dunbartonshire. Launched on 20 December 1945 as Empire Maysong and completed in December 1948 as Lochbroom for David MacBrayne Ltd, Glasgow. Now fitted with a diesel engine and 325 GRT. Sold in 1972 to Focomar Shipping Co Ltd, Cyprus and renamed Focomar. Operated under the management of S C Vazeos, Greece. On 19 September 1974, she ran aground at Andros Island, Greece and sank in deep water.

=== Empire Maytime ===
Empire Maytime was a 394 GRT coaster which was built by Ailsa Shipbuilding Co Ltd, Troon. Launched on 25 April 1945 and completed in July 1945. Sold in 1947 to Straits Steamship Co Ltd, Hong Kong and renamed Membau. Sold in 1953 to Shun Cheong Steam Navigation Co and renamed Adelina. Operated under the management of K S Pang, Hong Kong. Sold in 1955 to Hong Phat Hang, South Vietnam, and renamed Nam Sanh. On 30 October 1971 she was stranded and wrecked in a typhoon at Chu Lai, South Vietnam.

=== Empire Maytown ===
Empire Maytown was a 394 GRT coaster which was built by Henry Scarr Ltd, Hessle. Launched in August 1945 and completed in February 1946. Sold in 1947 to the Government of British Guiana and renamed Lady Berbice. Transferred to the Government of Guyana in 1966.

=== Empire Maytree ===
Empire Maytree was a 394 GRT coaster which was built by Ailsa Shipbuilding Ltd, Troon. Launched on 31 May 1945 and completed in August 1945. Sold in 1957 to Straits Steamship Co Ltd, Hong Kong and renamed Mantin. Sold in 1953 to Shun Cheong Steam Navigation Co and renamed Lorinda, now 554 GRT. Operated under the management of K S Pang, Hong Kong. Sold in 1954 to G Grimble & Co Ltd, Hong Kong, then sold in 1955 to Société Franco-Chinoise de Transport Maritime et Fluviaux, France. Sold in 1957 to the Indonesian Government and renamed Luen Hwa.

=== Empire Mead ===
Empire Mead was a 254 GRT tug which was built by Ferguson Bros, Port Glasgow. Launched on 6 April 1942 and completed in June 1942. Sold in 1948 to Nederland-Indonesia Steenkolen Handel Maatschappij and renamed Bodeker. Sold in 1959 to the Indonesian Government. Sold in 1961 to Tanjung Priok Port Authority and renamed Laut Belawan.

=== Empire Meadow ===
Empire Meadow was a 242 GRT tug which was built by J S Watson Ltd, Gainsborough. Launched on 4 June 1942 and completed in August 1942. Sold in 1946 to J Cooper, Belfast and renamed Meadow. Fitted with a new diesel engine in 1963. Sold in 1969 to R & J H Rea Ltd, then sold in 1970 to Cory Ship Towage Ltd. Sold in 1973 to Maritime Commercial Enterprises, Greece and renamed Hector. Sold in 1978 to H N Spiliopoulos, Greece. Scrapped in December 1978 at Perama, Greece.

=== Empire Medway (I) ===
Empire Medway was a 10,926 GRT cargo liner which was built by Napier and Miller Ltd, Glasgow. Launched in 1929 as Eastern Prince for Furness, Withy & Co Ltd. Requisitioned in November 1940 and converted to a troopship. Used as a floating hotel for British and American delegates to the Yalta Conference. To MoWT in 1946, but not renamed until 1950 when Furness, Withy wished to use her name for a new ship. In collision with HMT Empire Ken in Valletta Harbour, Malta in 1951. Scrapped in 1953 at Faslane.

=== Empire Medway (II) ===
Empire Medway was a 2,391 GRT cargo ship which was built by Moss Værft & Dokk, Moss, Norway. in 1938 as Wandsbeck for Knohr & Burchard, Hamburg. Bombed and sunk on 21 July 1941 at Narvik. Salvaged on 21 March 1943 and repaired. Seized as a prize in May 1945. To MoWT and renamed Empire Medway. Allocated to USSR in 1946, renamed Aleksandr Pushkin. No trace after 1955.

=== Empire Melody ===
Empire Melody was a 2,887 GRT cargo ship which was built by Grangemouth Dockyard Co Ltd, Grangemouth. Launched on 27 August 1942 and completed in November 1942. Sold in 1946 to Fairplay Towage & Shipping Co Ltd, Avonmouth and renamed Lucy Borchard. Sold in 1950 to Constants (South Wales) Ltd, Cardiff and renamed Nordeflinge. Sold in 1955 to Socoa Shipping co Ltd and renamed Ines. Operated under the management of R de la Sota, France. Sold in 1962 to Zanlouk Compagnia Maritime SA, Panama and renamed Popi K. Sold in 1968 to Astrovlanis Compagnia Navigatione, Panama and renamed Gold Sky. Operated under the management of G Vlanis Shipping Ltd, Greece.

Sprang a leak on 19 December 1968 and sank 20 nautical miles (37 km) off Gibraltar (35°57′N 04°52′W). Survivors rescued by MV Otto Leonhardt. Three crew remained on board and refused assistance from salvage tug Hercules, only leaving the ship when it was just about to sink. The ship was highly insured, but the insurers refused to pay out claiming she had been deliberately scuttled. In 1972, the ship's owners sued the insurers in the British Courts, and after a case that lasted 60 days, the Court found in the favour of the insurers.

=== Empire Merchant ===
Empire Merchant was a 3,457 GRT cargo ship which was built by Deutsche Werft, Hamburg. Completed in 1938 as Pomona for F Laeisz & Co, Hamburg. Seized as a war prize on 3 September 1939 at South West India Dock, London. To Ministry of War Transport and renamed Empire Merchant. Torpedoed on 16 August 1940 and sunk by U-100 at 55°23′N 13°24′W.

=== Empire Mercia ===
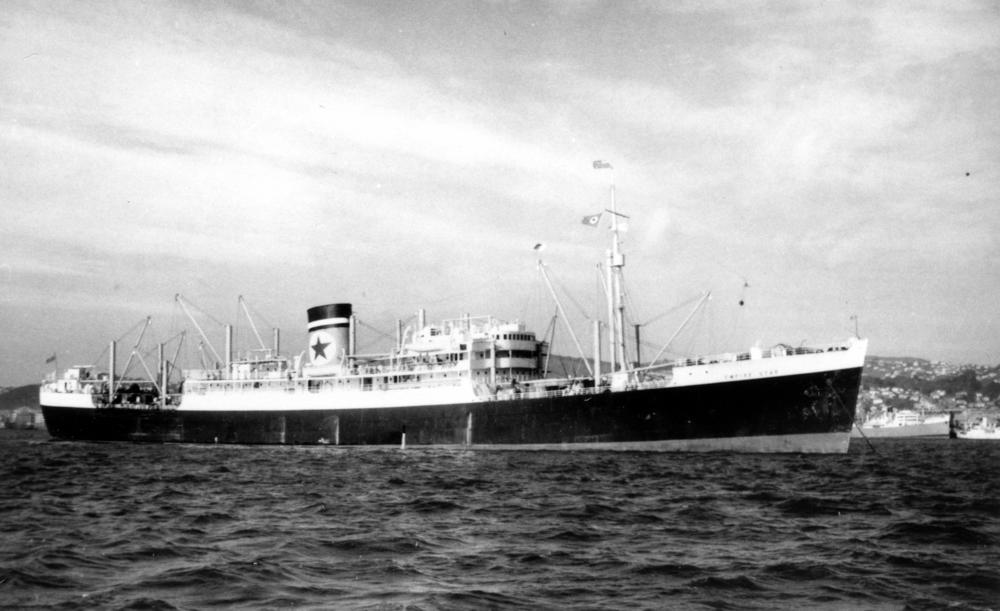
Empire Star

Empire Mercia was an 11,085 GRT refrigerated cargo ship which was built by Harland & Wolff Ltd, Belfast. Launched on 4 March 1946 as Empire Mercia and completed in December 1946 as Empire Star for Blue Star Line. Sold in 1950 to Lamport & Holt Line Ltd. Arrived on 16 October 1971 at Kaohsiung, Taiwan for scrapping.

=== Empire Merganser ===
Empire Merganser was a 6,220 GRT (9,400 DWT) refrigerated cargo ship which was built by Moore Shipbuilding Co, Oakland, California. Completed in January 1919 as Guimba for the USSB. Damaged by a mine in October 1919 off the mouth of the River Elbe. Repaired, but laid up in 1921. To MoWT in 1941 and renamed Empire Merganser. Sold in 1947 to United Whalers Ltd, London and renamed Ketos. Sold in 1949 to Hector Whaling Co Ltd, London. On 2 April 1951, an engine room explosion blew a hole in the hull. She sank on 3 April 1951 at 02°25′N 30°20′W.

=== Empire Merlin ===
Empire Merlin was a 5,680 GRT (8,800 DWT) cargo ship which was built by the Ames Shipbuilding and Drydock Company, Seattle. Completed in 1919 as West Isleta for the USSB. To American South African Line in 1926. To MoWT in 1940 and renamed Empire Merlin. Torpedoed on 25 August 1940 by U-48 and sunk at 58°30′N 10°15′W while a member of Convoy HX 65.

=== Empire Mermaid ===
Empire Mermaid was a 6,319 GRT cargo ship which was built by Skinner & Eddy, Seattle. Completed as Endicott for the USSB. To MoWT in 1940 and renamed Empire Mermaid. Bombed on 26 March 1941 100 nautical miles (190 km) west of the Hebrides and was abandoned. Sank on 28 March at 57°33′N 12°43′W.

=== Empire Mersey ===
Empire Mersey was a 5,791 GRT cargo ship which was built by R Duncan & Co Ltd, Port Glasgow. Completed in 1920 as Ramon de Larrinaga for Larrinaga Steamship Co Ltd, London. On 8 February 1941 she sprang a leak 75 nautical miles (139 km) off the New Jersey coast. Beached on 9 February at Lewes, Delaware but capsized and sank the following day. Refloated on 26 June 1941 and towed to Philadelphia where she was declared a constructive total loss. Sold and repaired, to MoWT in 1942 and renamed Empire Mersey.

She was then fitted out for demonstration of the Cierva C.40 autogyro to the USN. On learning of US development of the helicopter was used with the Sikorsky R-4 helicopter.

Torpedoed on 14 October 1942 by U-618 and sunk at 54°00′N 40°15′W while a member of Convoy SC 104.

=== Empire Metal (I) ===
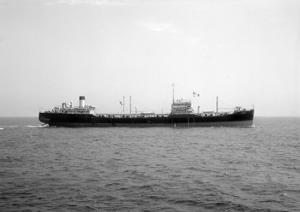
RFA Eaglesdale

Empire Metal was an 8,032 GRT tanker which was built by Furness Shipbuilding Co Ltd, Haverton Hill-on-Tees. Launched on 18 November 1941 as Empire Metal and completed in January 1942 as RFA Eaglesdale. Arrived on 29 November 1959 at Hamburg for scrapping.

=== Empire Metal (II) ===
Empire Metal was an 8,201 GRT tanker which was built by Harland & Wolff Ltd, Govan. Launched on 30 June 1942 and completed in September 1942. Bombed on 2 January 1943 and sunk at Bône Harbour, Algeria. In August 1949 she was raised but broke in two. The stern section was beached at Grenouillère in May 1950 and scrapped in situ. The bow section was towed to Savona, Italy for scrapping. Machinery was salvaged and shipped to Canada. It was installed in SS Captain C D Secord in 1954.

=== Empire Meteor ===
Empire Meteor was a 7,457 GRT cargo ship which was built by J L Thompson & Sons Ltd, Sunderland. Launched on 3 September 1940 and completed in December 1940. Bombed on 29 June 1941 and damaged in the North Sea (53°05′N 01°30′E). Towed to the Humber Estuary and then repaired at Hull. Sold in 1946 to United British Steamship Co Ltd and renamed Dorington Court. Operated under the management of Haldin & Co Ltd. Sold in 1956 to Insa Società di Navigazione, Genoa and renamed Giada. Sold in 1960 to P Kyprianou & Partners and renamed Sheikh. Operated under the management of P J Angouras, Greece. Came ashore on 2 October 1961 in a typhoon at Kita Daito Jima, Japan and broke in two. Sold locally for scrapping.

=== Empire Mica ===
Empire Mica was an 8,032 GRT tanker which was built by Furness Shipbuilding Co Ltd, Haverton Hill-on-Tees. Launched on 10 April 1941 and completed in July 1941. Torpedoed on 29 June 1942 by U-67 and sunk at 29°29′N 85°17′W near Apalachicola, FL.

=== Empire Might (I) ===
Empire Might was a 9,909 GRT cargo ship which was built by William Denny & Bros Ltd, Dumbarton. Launched on 26 May 1941 as Clan Buchanan. Requisitioned by the Admiralty for proposed conversion to an armed boarding vessel, name Empire Might allocated. A later proposal was to use her as an auxiliary seaplane carrier but she was completed in November 1941 as merchant aircraft ferry ship Engadine. Sold in May 1946 to Clan Line Steamers Ltd and renamed Clan Buchanan. Arrived on 14 November 1962 at Cartagena, Spain for scrapping.

=== Empire Might (II) ===
Empire Might was a 9,208 GRT cargo liner which was built by Greenock Dockyard Co Ltd, Greenock. Launched on 17 April 1942 and completed in August 1942. Managed by Blue Star Line for the MoWT. Sold in 1946 to Clan Line Steamers Ltd and renamed Clan Macrae. Sold in 1959 to Bullard, King & Co Ltd and renamed Umgeni. Sold in 1960 to Springbok Shipping Co Ltd and renamed Gemsbok. Sold in 1961 to South African Marine Corp Ltd and renamed South African Financier. Sold in 1962 to NV Redwijs, Baarn, Netherlands and renamed Santa Maria de Ordaz. Scrapped in March 1962 at Valencia, Spain.

=== Empire Milner ===
Empire Milner was an 8,135 GRT tanker which was built by Furness Shipbuilding Co Ltd, Haverton Hill-on-Tees. Launched on 9 February 1944 and completed in June 1944. Transferred to Royal Fleet Auxiliary in December 1946 and renamed RFA Wave Liberator. Arrived on 4 May 1959 at Hong Kong for scrapping.

=== Empire Miniver ===
Empire Miniver was a 6,055 GRT (8,800 DWT) cargo ship which was built by Columbia River Shipbuilding Corp, Portland, Oregon. Completed in December 1918 as West Cobalt for USSB. to Lykes Brothers-Ripley Steamship Co Inc in 1933. To MoWT in 1940 and renamed Empire Miniver. Torpedoed on 18 October 1940 and sunk by U-99 northwest of Ireland, some 250 nautical miles (460 km) off Rathlin Head while a member of Convoy SC 7.

=== Empire Minnow ===
Empire Minnow was a 258 GRT tug which was built by Scott & Sons, Bowling, West Dunbartonshire. Launched on 24 September 1942 and completed in April 1943. Sold in 1948 to British India Steam Navigation Co Ltd and renamed Thika. Sold in 1951 to Britannia Steam Towing Co Ltd and renamed Clyneforth. Sold in 1962 to Alexandra Towing Co Ltd. Sold in 1966 to J S Latsis, Greece and renamed Ena. Scrapped in September 1969 at Piraeus, Greece.

=== Empire Minotaur ===
Empire Minotaur was a 235 GRT tug which was built by A Hall & Co Ltd, Aberdeen. Launched on 16 April 1942 and completed in July 1942. Sold in 1949 to Townsville Harbour Board, Australia and renamed Lalor. Scuttled in 1969 off Townsville, Queensland.

=== Empire Miranda ===
Empire Miranda was a 7,054 GRT cargo ship which was built by Lithgows Ltd, Port Glasgow. Launched on 18 March 1943 and completed in April 1943. Sold in 1947 to T & J Harrison Ltd and renamed Merchant. Sold in 1961 to Compagnia Navigazione Margalante, Panama and renamed Trito. Arrived on 26 May 1961 at Hong Kong for scrapping.

=== Empire Mist ===
Empire Mist was a 7,241 GRT cargo ship which was built by William Doxford & Sons Ltd, Sunderland. Launched on 29 October 1940 and completed in March 1941. Sold in 1945 to King Line Ltd and renamed King David. Sold in 1963 to Wallem & Co Ltd, Hong Kong and renamed Hong Kong Venture. Operated under the management of T Y Chao, Hong Kong. Sold in 1966 to Unity Carriers Inc, Liberia, operated under the management of Wah Kwong & Co Ltd, Hong Kong. Arrived on 19 April 1969 in Hong Kong for scrapping.

=== Empire Moat ===
Empire Moat was a 2,922 GRT ore carrier which was built by Lithgows Ltd, Port Glasgow. Launched on 28 April 1941 and completed in July 1941. Torpedoed on 20 September 1941 by U-124 800 nautical miles (1,500 km) west of Ushant, France (48°07′N 22°05′W) while a member of Convoy OG 74. Ship was abandoned but remained afloat although salvage was impracticable. Presumed to have sunk.

=== Empire Mole ===
Empire Mole was a 4,876 GRT cargo ship which was built by Deutsche Werft, Hamburg. Completed in 1939 as Panther for Laeisz Line. Towed to Copenhagen for completion by Burmeister & Wain. Completed in 1941, requisitioned by the Kriegsmarine, converted to an auxiliary cruiser and renamed Salzburg. Seized in May 1945 in the Kiel Canal, to MoWT and renamed Empire Mole. Sold in 1947 to Elders & Fyffes Ltd and renamed Reventazon. Sold in 1963 to Jade Co Inc, Panama and renamed Kimolos. Sold in 1972 to G J Krargeorgis Shipping Ltd, Greece and renamed Vassilia K. Scrapped in December 1973 at Kaohsiung, Taiwan.

=== Empire Mombasa ===
Empire Mombasa was a 7,319 GRT cargo ship which was built by Shipbuilding Corporation Ltd, Sunderland. Launched on 28 May 1945 and completed in February 1946. Sold in 1946 to India Steamship Co Ltd, Calcutta and renamed Indian Enterprise. On 19 June 1950 she suffered an onboard explosion and sank 300 nautical miles (560 km) south of Suez (25°31′N 35°27′E) while carrying a cargo that included explosives.

=== Empire Moon ===
Empire Moon was a 7,472 GRT CAM ship which was built by J L Thompson & Sons Ltd, Sunderland. Launched on 15 December 1940 and completed in May 1941. Collided on 26 September 1941 with Empire Mallard near Point Armour, Strait of Belle Isle. Empire Mallard sank, Empire Moon only slightly damaged. Torpedoed on 22 July 1943 by U-81 and damaged off Sicily (36°42′N 15°20′E). Towed to Syracuse and beached. Refloated in June 1945 and towed to Palermo where she was repaired. Sold in 1949 to Mediterranean Steamship Co Ltd, London and renamed Ionian Moon. Sold in 1953 to Sterling Shipping Co Ltd, Bahamas and renamed Sterling Victory. Operated under the management of A Vergottis Ltd, London. Sold in 1957 to Compagnia Navigazione Campos, Panama and renamed Alma, flying the Liberian flag. Sold in 1968 to Compagnia Navigazione Campos, Panama and renamed Campos. Operated under the management of Michalinos Maritime & Commercial Co Ltd, Greece. Scrapped in March 1970 at Shanghai.

=== Empire Moonbeam ===
Empire Moonbeam was a 6,849 GRT cargo ship which was built by Hong Kong & Whampoa Dock Co Ltd, Hong Kong. Launched on 31 March 1941 and completed in June 1941. Torpedoed on 12 September 1942 and damaged by U-211 then torpedoed by U-608 and sunk at 48°55′N 33°38′W while a member of Convoy ON 127.

=== Empire Moonrise ===
Empire Moonrise was a 6,854 GRT cargo ship which was built by Hong Kong & Whampoa Dock Co Ltd, Hong Kong. Launched on 14 June 1941 and competed in August 1941. Damaged on 9 April 1942 by enemy bombing at Colombo, Ceylon. Sold in 1945 to Gowan Steamship Co Ltd and renamed Hartland Point. Operated under the management of D J McLaren & Co Ltd, London. Sold in 1947 to James Burness & Sons Ltd, London and renamed Burmount. Sold in 1954 to Maritima Mensabe SA and renamed Marilena. Operated under the management of J P Hadoulis Ltd, London. Sold in 1957 to Compagnia y de Comercio Athamas Ltda, Costa Rica and renamed Athamas. Sold in 1966 to Agenor Shipping Ltd, Cyprus. Arrived on 27 September 1966 at Whampoa, Hong Kong for scrapping.

=== Empire Moorhen ===
Empire Moorhen was a 5,628 GRT (8,800 DWT) cargo ship which was built by Columbia River Shipbuilding, Portland, Oregon. Completed in December 1918 as West Totant for the USSB. To MoWT in 1941 and renamed Empire Moorhen. Sunk on 9 June 1944 as part of Gooseberry 4, Juno Beach, Courseulles-sur-Mer, Calvados. Raised in 1947 and scrapped at Troon, Ayrshire.

=== Empire Moorland ===
Empire Moorland was a 683 GRT dredger which was built by William Simons & Co Ltd, Renfrew. Launched on 21 December 1945 and completed in 1946. To the Admiralty in 1946 and renamed W 98. Renamed W 29 in 1948. To Ministry of Public Building and Works in 1963. Offered for sale at Portsmouth by the Board of Trade in 1972.

=== Empire Moose ===
Empire Moose was a 6,103 GRT cargo ship which was built by Virginia Shipbuilding Corp, Alexandria, Virginia. Completed in 1920 as Colin H Livingstone for the United States Transportation Co. To USSB in 1923 and renamed Oakwood. To Lykes Brothers-Ripley Steamship Co Inc. To MoWT in 1940 and renamed Empire Moose. Torpedoed on 29 August 1940 by U-100 and sunk at 56°06′N 13°33′W when a straggler from Convoy OA 204.

=== Empire Mordred ===
Empire Mordred was a 7,030 GRT cargo ship which was built by C Connell & Co Ltd, Glasgow. Launched on 15 June 1942 and completed in August 1942. Hit a mine on 7 February 1943 at 35°58′N 05°59′W and broke in two. The bow section sank, and the stern section initially remained afloat but sank before a tug arrived to tow it to port.

=== Empire Morley ===
Empire Morley was a 7,068 GRT cargo ship which was built by Shipbuilding Corporation Ltd, Newcastle upon Tyne. Launched on 28 November 1944 and completed in February 1945. Sold in 1947 to Tower Steamship Co Ltd and renamed Tower Grange. Operated under the management of Counties Ship Management Co Ltd. Sold in 1950 to London & Overseas Freighters Ltd and renamed London Trader, then sold later that year to Compagnia Maritime Azores, Liberia and renamed Nico. Scrapped in June 1969 at Etajima, Japan.

=== Empire Morn ===
Empire Morn was a 7,092 GRT CAM ship which was built by Vickers-Armstrongs Ltd, Barrow in Furness. Launched on 1 July 1941 and completed in September 1941. Damaged on 26 April 1943 by a mine off Rabat, Morocco, at 34°08′N 07°58′W beached and initially expected to be declared a total constructive loss. Refloated and towed to Gibraltar, arriving on 1 September 1943. Used as a storage hulk. Sold in 1947 to F M Pereda, Spain and renamed San Antonio. Towed to Cádiz, arriving on 12 March 1947 and renamed Rio Pas. Repaired, with a new stern section. Sold in 1962 to Maritima Colonial y de Comercio SA, Spain. Scrapped in 1973 in Santander, Spain.

=== Empire Mortimer ===
Empire Mortimer was a 7,051 GRT cargo ship which was built by William Gray & Co Ltd, West Hartlepool. Launched on 23 December 1943 and completed in March 1943. Sold in 1947 to Norwood Steamship Co Ltd and renamed Lord Gladstone. Operated under the management of Ships Finance & Management Ltd, London. sold in 1958 to Compagnia de Navigazione San Antonio Ltd, Costa Rica and renamed Olga Minacoulis. Sold in 1964 to San Antonio Shipping Ltd, Malta and renamed St Antonio. Sold in 1966 to Danish shipbreakers, resold and arrived under tow on 3 February 1966 at Santander, Spain for scrapping.

=== Empire Mouflon ===
Empire Mouflon was a 3,329 GRT (5,530 DWT) cargo ship which was built by Hanlon Dry Dock and Shipbuilding, Oakland, California. Completed in 1921 as Memnon for the USSB. To Columbia River Packers Association in 1925. To MoWT in 1940 and renamed Empire Mouflon, Ship’s number: 167633, International Code Signal (under the name Preston (3)) GQLW. New boilers fitted in 1943 after continuing problems with old boilers. Sold in 1946 to Sir R Ropner & Co Ltd and renamed Preston. During WWII, she was an Atlantic convoy ship, sometimes used to transport high explosives. During this time her master was Captain Reginald Douglass Sparling. Sold in 1951 to Compagnia Maritime Avance SA, Panama and renamed Avance. Sold in 1957 to Avlis Shipping Co SA and renamed Avlis. Operated under the management of G Dracopoulos, Greece. Scrapped in June 1962 at Piraeus, Greece.

=== Empire Moulmein ===
Empire Moulmein was a 7,047 GRT cargo ship which was built by John Readhead & Sons Ltd, South Shields. Launched on 8 June 1944 and completed in August 1944. Allocated to the French Government in 1945 and renamed Colonel Vieljeux. Sold in 1948 to Nouvelle Compagnie Havraise Peninsulaire de Navigation, Paris and renamed Ville de Diego Suarez. Sold in 1961 to Société Anonyme Monegasque d'Armement et de Navigation, Monaco and renamed Vimy. Sold in 1962 to Sadikolgu, riza ve Aslan, ve Ortagi Adi Komandit Sirketi, Turkey and renamed Demirhan. Sold in 1966 to Manizade Vapuru Donmata Istiraki and renamed Manizade. Scrapped in March 1976 at Aliaga, Turkey.

=== Empire Mountain ===
Empire Mountain was a 2,906 GRT cargo ship which was built by William Gray & Co Ltd, West Hartlepool. Launched on 3 April 1943 and completed in June 1943. Sold in 1951 to Moller Line Ltd and renamed Hannah Moller. Operated under the management of Mollers Ltd, Hong Kong. Sold in 1951 to Mount Line Ltd and renamed Mount Parker, remaining under Mollers' management. Sold in 1952 to the Australian Shipping Board and renamed Carcoola. Sold in 1952 to Cambay Prince Steamship Co Ltd and renamed Tees Breeze. Operated under the management of J Manners & Co Ltd, Hong Kong. Sold in 1964 to Oriental Trader Navigation Co SA, Panama and renamed Victoria Trader. Operated under the management of China Pacific Navigation Co Ltd, Hong Kong. Scrapped in July 1967 at Kaohsiung, Taiwan.

=== Empire Mowddach ===
Empire Mowddach was a 3,410 GRT cargo ship which was built by Bremer Vulkan Schiff- und Maschinenbau, Vegesack. Completed in 1935 as Pontos for F Laeisz, Hamburg. Requisitioned by the Kriegsmarine in 1940. Seized at Flensburg in May 1945. To MoWT and renamed Empire Mowddach. Sold in 1947 to Elders & Fyffes Ltd and renamed Nicoya. Scrapped in 1959 at Briton Ferry, West Glamorgan.

=== Empire Mull ===
Empire Mull was a 797 GRT coastal tanker, built by Grangemouth Dockyard Co Ltd, Grangemouth. Launched on 22 May 1944 and completed in August 1944. Allocated in 1946 to the French Government and renamed Medea. Sold in 1950 to Compagnie Franco-Africaine de Navigation, France. Sold in 1951 to Société Navale d L'Ouest, France, then sold again later that year to G S Stein KG, Germany and renamed Christine. Sold in 1956 to Bulk Oil Steamship Co Ltd and renamed Pass of Kintail. Sold in 1963 to Navalpetroli Società di Navigazione, Italy and renamed Passamare. Sold in 1965 to Seka SA and renamed Kali Limenes. Operated under the management of N Vardinoyannis, Greece. On shipping registers until 1986.

=== Empire Mustang ===
Empire Mustang was a 242 GRT tug which was built by J S Watson Ltd, Gainsborough. Launched on 2 June 1943 and completed in August 1943. Sold in 1947 to Tees Towing Co Ltd and renamed Dundas Cross. Sold in 1958 to Newport Screw Towing Co Ltd and renamed Duneagle. Sold in 1965 to Tsavliris Ltd, Greece and renamed Nisos Syros. Sold in 1975 to Maritime Commercial Enterprises, Greece. Scrapped in 1976 in Greece.

== See also ==
The above entries give a precis of each ship's history. For a fuller account see the linked articles.

== Sources ==
- Mitchell, WH; Sawyer, LA (1990). The Empire Ships. London, New York, Hamburg, Hong Kong: Lloyd's of London Press. ISBN 1-85044-275-4.
