= SS Corvus (1919) =

American steam cargo ship

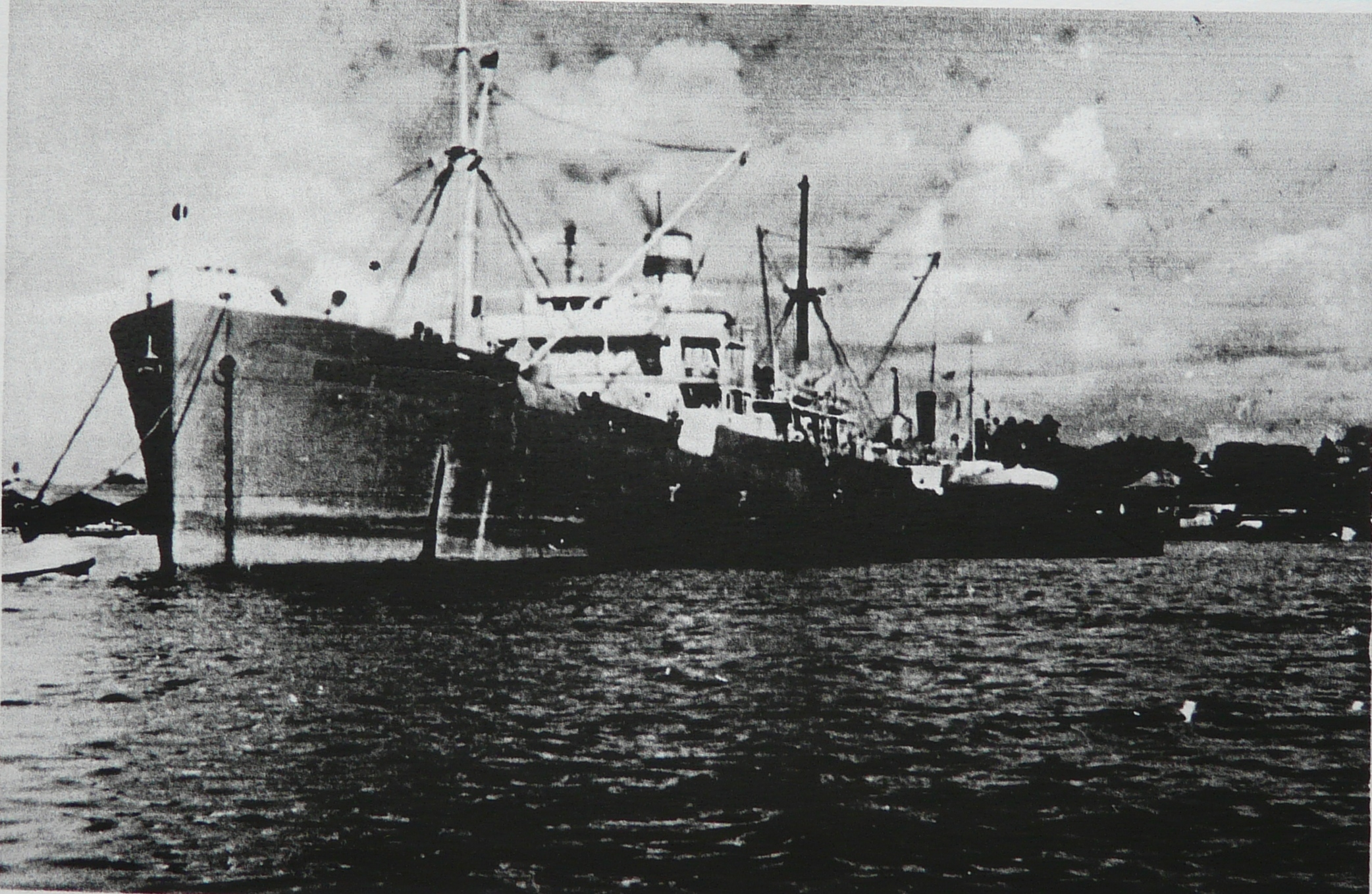
- Sister ship Karaganda (ex-Circinus). Photo dated between 18 March 1961 and 1 October 1963.

History

United States
- Name: Corvus (1919–1930); Flomar (1930–1945); Uzbekistan (1945)
- Namesake: Corvus
- Owner: Green Star Line (1919–1923); Planet Steamship Co. (1923 – Dec 1929); Calmar Steamship Corp. (Dec 1929 – 10 Jan 1945) (Note: From 20 December 1941 through 10 January 1945 Calmar operated the ship as the WSA agent.); War Shipping Administration (10 Jan 1945 – 5 July 1946)
- Operator: Green Star Line (1919–1923); Isthmian Steamship Company (1923–1929); War Shipping Administration (20 December 1941 – 10 Jan 1945) (Note: WSA controlled operation of all oceanic U.S. merchant ships under wartime regulations. The owning companies often continued to operate the vessels as agents for WSA.); Far East Shipping Co. (10 Jan 1945 – 11 Aug 1945); War Shipping Administration (11 Aug 1945 – 5 July 1946)
- Builder: Columbia River Shipbuilding Company, Portland
- Yard number: 33
- Launched: 6 November 1919
- Sponsored by: Mrs. M. E. Thorne
- Christened: Frances Smith
- Completed: 21 November 1919
- Commissioned: 26 November 1919
- Maiden voyage: 26 November 1919
- Home port: New York; Vladivostok (1945)
- Identification: US Official Number 219269; Call sign LTSQ (1919–1933); Call sign KOPL (1934–1945); Call sign UURO (1945)
- Fate: Scrapped, August 1946

General characteristics
- Class & type: Design 1013 Cargo ship
- Tonnage: 5,749 GRT (1919–1930); 5,551 GRT (1930–1945); 3,550 NRT (1919–1930); 3,422 NRT (1930–1945); 8,640 DWT
- Length: 410.0 ft (125.0 m)
- Beam: 54.2 ft (16.5 m)
- Depth: 27.5 ft (8.4 m)
- Installed power: 582 Nhp, 2,800 ihp
- Propulsion: Llewellyn Iron Works 3-cylinder triple expansion
- Speed: 11 1/2 knots (13.2 mph; 21.3 km/h)
- Complement: 60 (1945)
- Armament: In Soviet service (1945); 1 x 102 mm (4 in) naval gun; 1 x 76.2 mm (3 in) anti-aircraft gun; 8 x 20 mm anti-aircraft gun

Corvus was a steam cargo ship built in 1919 by Columbia River Shipbuilding Company of Portland for the United States Shipping Board as part of the wartime shipbuilding program of the Emergency Fleet Corporation (EFC) to restore the nation's Merchant Marine. The freighter was operated on international and domestic routes through 1944. Early in 1945 she was transferred to Soviet Union as part of lend-lease program and renamed Uzbekistan. After several months of operation, the freighter was rammed by another vessel on 31 May 1945 and was beached to avoid sinking. She was subsequently raised and towed to Portland where she was scrapped in 1946.

== Design and construction ==
After the United States entered into World War I, a large shipbuilding program was undertaken to restore and enhance shipping capabilities both of the United States and their Allies. As part of this program, EFC placed orders with nation's shipyards for a large number of vessels of standard designs. Design 1013 cargo ship was a standard cargo freighter of approximately 8,800 tons deadweight designed by Skinner & Eddy Corp. and adopted by USSB.

West Hastan was part of the order for 14 vessels placed by USSB with Columbia River Shipbuilding Co. on 28 May 1918. Soon after the end of hostilities, USSB started suspension and cancellation of contracts for ships ordered at war time prices. In April 1919 USSB cancelled or suspended construction of a large number of vessels being built at various shipyards around the country. In July 1919 some of the contracts were briefly reinstated, including the one for West Hastan, however, it was permanently cancelled on 21 August 1919. Despite the cancellation, the Columbia River Shipbuilding Co. decided to finish two cancelled freighters, future Corvus and Circinus, and try to sell them privately. The vessel was laid down at the shipbuilder's South Portland yard and launched on 6 November 1919 (yard number 33), with Mrs. M. E. Thorne, aunt of Mrs. Smith, being the sponsor. As the ship slipped into the water, she was named Frances Smith in honor of the wife of Alfred F. Smith, owner of the Columbia River Shipbuilding Co. Shortly thereafter, the vessel was bought together with three more freighters of approximately the same size by the newly formed Green Star Steamship Co. and immediately renamed Corvus, after one of the constellations.

The ship was shelter-deck type, had two main decks and had five main holds which allowed for the carriage of a variety of goods and merchandise. The vessel also possessed all the modern machinery for quick loading and unloading of cargo from five large hatches, including ten winches and a large number of derricks. She was also equipped with wireless apparatus, had submarine signal system installed and had electric lights installed along the decks.

As built, the ship was 410.0 feet (125.0 m) long (between perpendiculars) and 54.2 feet (16.5 m) abeam, a depth of 27.5 feet (8.4 m). Corvus was originally assessed at 5,749 GRT and 3,550 NRT and had deadweight of approximately 8,600. The vessel had a steel hull with double bottom throughout with exception of her machine compartment, and a single 2,800 ihp triple expansion steam engine, with cylinders of 24 1/2-inch (62 cm), 41 1/2-inch (105 cm) and 72-inch (180 cm) diameter with a 48-inch (120 cm) stroke, that drove a single screw propeller and moved the ship at up to 11 1/2 knots (13.2 mph; 21.3 km/h). The steam for the engine was supplied by three single-ended Scotch marine boilers fitted for both coal and oil fuel.

The sea trials were held in the Columbia River on 21 November 1919 with the ship performing satisfactorily. Following their successful completion, Corvus was handed over to her owners next day.

== Operational history ==
Following delivery to the Green Star Steamship Co., the ship departed from the shipbuilder's yard on 26 November 1919 and after a short stop at the oil dock departed on her first trip in the morning of November 27 bound for Arica. The vessel reached Antofagasta on December 21 loaded a cargo of nitrates and from there proceeded to Europe via the Panama Canal. The ship eventually returned to the East Coast on 1 April 1920, successfully concluding her maiden voyage.

Corvus continued tramp trading between the East Coast and ports of United Kingdom and Europe. She chiefly transported coal on her eastward journeys. For example, she carried about 7,000 tons of coal to Gibraltar and England in February and June 1921. In June 1921 Corvus, as she was leaving Baltimore on her way to England, came across Matson liner SS Buckeye State with fire raging in her fire room. Hoses were run from the freighter to the liner, and the fire was quickly subdued. A shipping crisis that started in 1921 due to overabundance of tonnage and scarcity of cargo hit Green Star Steamship Co. very hard. After its organization it chose rapid expansion, acquiring close to forty vessels and incurring a large amount of debt. As business dried up, and many ships were forced to be either laid up or sit idle in ports, the company defaulted on its debt obligations, and after a two-year-long struggle to get help from USSB, it was forced into receivership and had to sell its assets. Corvus remained idle during this period of time, but eventually was sold to Planet Steamship Co. at the end of February 1923 together with several other vessels at the U.S. Marshal auction held in Baltimore for US$45,000.

Following the acquisition, Planet Steamship Co. decided to allocate Corvus and another freighter, SS Santa Cecilia, to intercoastal East to West Coast trade. Corvus was reconditioned in Baltimore and left the port on 25 April 1923 for her first voyage under new flag carrying 7,500 tons cargo of steel and general merchandise to West Coast ports. On her return trip the ship carried 4,600 tons of lumber and general cargo to New York. The vessel remained in this coastal trade through the second half of 1924 at which point she was temporarily switched to South American service. After conducting two trips to Argentina with lumber, Corvus returned to her usual coast to coast trade route in 1925. She continued serving this route for the next several years, largely carrying steel and steel products and general cargo on her westward journeys being often chartered to Isthmian Line. On her eastward trips she carried lumber and general cargo from various ports of the Pacific Northwest. On one of such trips in March 1927 she broke and lost one of her propeller blades after striking a submerged object and had to be towed to San Francisco for repairs. The repairs were done in five days and were accomplished without unloading the ship's cargo of 4,800,000 feet of lumber. In September 1928 Corvus while on a trip from Rio de Janeiro to Baltimore with a cargo of manganese ore ran out of fuel while in the Caribbean Sea and was drifting helplessly until saved by US Navy minesweeper Grebe who brought her into Trinidad for refueling.

=== Calmar Steamship Corporation ===
In 1927 Bethlehem Steel founded Calmar Steamship Corp. as a whole subsidiary company to transport steel and steel products from the company's steel mills in Maryland and Pennsylvania to the West Coast customers. Calmar transported exclusively Bethlehem's products westbound but served as a common carrier carrying lumber and other cargoes on their return voyages eastwards for a variety of shippers.

In November 1929 it was reported that Calmar Steamship Corp. placed a bid in the amount of US$937,500 for five steamers operated by Planet Steamship Corp. with Corvus being valued at US$179,843 Approximately two weeks later the sale went through and all five vessels were sold to Calmar increasing the size of their operational intercoastal fleet to eleven vessels. Following the sale all five new vessels were renamed according to Calmar Steamship established naming pattern, where the names of the ships consisted of two parts, the prefix corresponding to a state, city or facility operated by Bethlehem Steel, and the second part consisting of word "-mar", an abbreviation for Maryland. Under this naming tradition, Corvus became Flomar and was turned to her new owners after reconditioning and repairs were done. Flomar cleared out of Philadelphia on her first trip for Calmar Steamship carrying 7,700 tons of steel and other cargo on 25 January 1930, passed through the Panama Canal on February 4 and arrived in Los Angeles on February 17. After unloading approximately 3,400 tons of cargo in California the steamer proceeded further north to unload the rest of her cargo and load lumber for her return trip.

Flomar remained in the intercoastal service through the early part of 1941. For example, in March 1934 she delivered a variety of goods to California from the East Coast including canned goods, machinery and even several luxury automobiles. In December 1932 she had to fight off a strong gale off Cape Meares resulting in her deck cargo shifting. The freighter managed to make the port even though she had a list of 22°. After restoring her load, the ship was able to continue her journey.

In November 1934 during one of her usual trips from Los Angeles to Baltimore Flomar became disabled after losing her propeller about forty miles away from the Panama Canal. The vessel was towed into port for evaluation and repairs. After examination it was discovered that the vessel broke her tail shaft and was put into drydock for quick repairs. She was able to depart on December 10 and continue on to her destination.

On 18 September 1935 Flomar was proceeding down San Joaquin River for San Francisco. At the same time Quaker Line freighter SS Peter Kerr was moving up the river to Stockton. At about 01:30 when about seven miles southwest of Stockton, Peter Kerr suddenly lost control of her rudder after hitting a river bank and struck Flomar. The collision left Flomar with a hole in her No. 1 hold under the waterline and smashed port bow, however, the freighter was able to proceed to San Francisco under her own power where she was put in Hunter's Point drydock for repairs. Peter Kerr suffered damage to her bow and in addition had a couple of holes in her bow above the waterline. She continued on to Stockton to unload 800 tons of cargo there before also sailing for Oakland where she too was put into Moore's drydock for repairs and evaluation. The cost of repair was estimated to be US$40,000 for Peter Kerr and US$50,000 for Flomar. Both owners filed libel suits against each other, with Calmar Steamship asking for US$125,000 in damages, and Pacific Atlantic Co., owner of Peter Kerr, demanding US$75,000.

In December 1936 Flomar went aground in New York harbor near Sandy Hook as she was towed by tug H.W. Card. The freighter was refloated within several hours and was able to continue her trip.

Flomar remained on the same trade route through June 1940. For example, she brought in a large quantity of steel to Tacoma in 1939 to be used in bridge construction there and loaded a large cargo of lumber at various ports of the pacific Northwest for her return trip. The freighter returned to East Coast on her last peace-time trip on 11 June 1941 and went into dock for maintenance and repairs. At the same time following the Emergency proclamation issued by President Roosevelt on 27 May 1941, the vessel together with many other ships were chartered by the Maritime Commission for Red Sea service, which would allow the vessels under US flag to carry matériel and supplies for British troops fighting in North Africa. Flomar loaded her cargo in New York but was delayed for several days due to a strike by seamen demanding increased payments for travel into a combat zone. After the strike was settled Flomar sailed from New York on 9 July 1941 arriving in Port Sudan on August 31 via Cape Town and Aden. The freighter returned to Savannah on December 4 after picking up cargo in India and Ceylon.

On 20 December 1941 the ship was delivered to the War Shipping Administration (WSA) at Baltimore for operation under a United States Army Transportation Corps agreement by Calmar as the WSA operating agent.

Flomar conducted one more voyage to the Red Sea area in 1942 departing Baltimore on 27 December 1941 and arriving at Suez on 3 March 1942. She again proceeded back via Colombo and Bombay reaching Baltimore on July 13. (Note: The Maritime Administration status card shows the ship redelivered 19 July 1942 until returning to WSA operation under a Transportation Corps agreement 25 August 1942.) On her third war-time trip the freighter sailed to Panama Canal as part of convoys NG-304 and GZ-4 and from there entered the Pacific and proceeded to South Africa. After unloading her cargo at Cape Town and Port Elizabeth in November 1942, the vessel proceeded on to Paramaribo. From there the ship sailed for New York as part of convoys TAG-30 and GN-30, reaching her destination on New Year's Day 1943.

Following her return, the freighter was made part of convoy UGS-5 and departed Newport News on 7 February 1943 for Morocco as part of support mission for Operation Torch. The vessel unloaded her cargo in Fedala and then returned to United States via Gibraltar and England as part of convoys XK-3 and ON 181. During 1943 Flomar made two trips between United States, Canada and Liverpool carrying general cargo and war supplies as part of convoys SC-135 and HX 253. After returning to United States in October 1943 the ship was reassigned into coastwise service. She was mostly involved in short range missions plying trade between East Coast of the United States and various Cuban and Puerto-Rican ports, such as Guantanamo, Nuevitas as well as Curaçao, Aruba and Maracaibo. Flomar remained in this service through the second half of November 1944. She then was transferred to West Coast arriving in Astoria on New Year's Day 1945. There she was evaluated, purchased by WSA and transferred as part of lend-lease agreement to the USSR Far East Shipping Company on 10 January 1945.

=== Far East Shipping Company ===
Following arrival on the West Coast Flomar was accepted by the Soviet Purchasing Commission, placed under Soviet registry as Uzbekistan and was transferred to Far East Shipping Company on 10 January 1945. Subsequently, the vessel was put into dock for maintenance and repairs on January 29 and following their completion sailed to Petropavlovsk on February 3. The freighter arrived at Petropavlovsk on February 19 via Akutan coaling station where she was defensively armed and prepared for service.

The ships sailing in the Pacific between the West Coast ports of the United States and Soviet Union usually traveled unescorted with ship information being provided to the US Navy prior to ships' arrival, although Soviet vessels sometimes broke this rule. Uzbekistan arrived unannounced on 31 May 1945 at Dutch Harbor from Petropavlovsk for coaling. After filling her bunkers, the freighter sailed out from port. As she was exiting the Iliuliuk Bay about 23:19, she was struck amidships by incoming steamer SS American Star on her port side. The collision produced a large hole at her main deck level but also damaged the ship's hull below waterline around her boiler room resulting in rapid flooding of the vessel's engine room. Despite the flooding, the engines continued working and the captain of Uzbekistan decided to beach the ship to avoid sinking. The ship ran aground on Ulakta Head at about 23:27. Harbor tug Osamekin (YTB-191) was dispatched and stood by the stricken vessel assisting the survivors.

An inspection of the vessel took place on June 1 and it was determined that the ship needs stabilization first before any attempt to refloat could be undertaken due to the freighter's position and sustained damage. All preparatory operations were finalized by June 6 and Uzbekistan was successfully refloated. The freighter was then towed to Dutch Harbor where temporary repairs were done, and the vessel was able to depart for West Coast on June 30. Uzbekistan arrived at Portland on July 10 and was immediately put into dock for evaluation. Due to the condition and age of the vessel, the Soviet Government returned the ship to the United States effective 11 August 1945. The ship remained berthed in Portland with Pacific Atlantic SS Co. and States SS Co. acting as WSA agents until sold to Dulien Steel Products, Inc. for $1,675.00, delivered 5 July 1946 for scrapping in August 1946.
