= SS American (1900) =

American steel-hulled, single propeller cargo ship

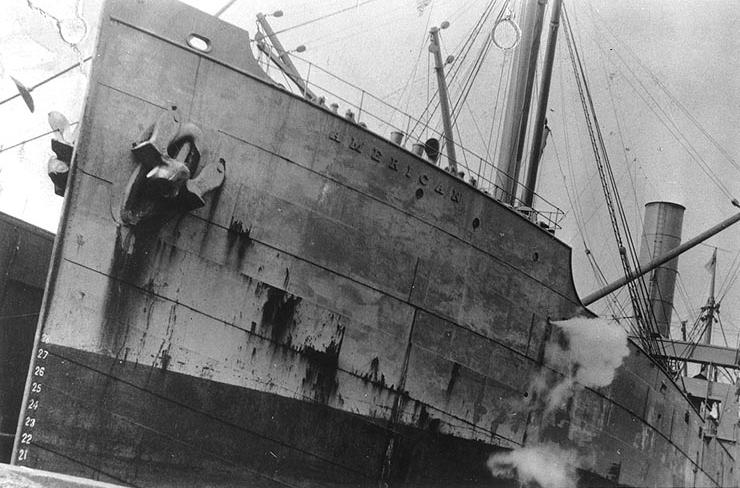
- USS American

History
- Name: 1900: SS American; 1925: SS Honolulan
- Owner: American-Hawaiian Steamship Company
- Port of registry: (United States) New York
- Route: Hawaii – New York
- Ordered: 1899
- Builder: Delaware River Iron Shipbuilding and Engine Works
- Cost: $540,000 ($425,000 for the ship, $115,000 financing costs)
- Yard number: 308
- Launched: 14 July 1900
- Completed: October 1900
- Identification: U.S. official number: 107591
- Fate: scrapped in Osaka, November 1926

History

United States
- Name: USS American (ID-2292)
- Commissioned: 25 May 1918
- Stricken: 14 March 1919

General characteristics
- Tonnage: 6,861 GRT 8,850 LT DWT
- Displacement: 13,000 long tons (13,200 t)
- Length: 430 ft 1 in (131.09 m) (oa); 406 ft 10 in (124.00 m) (lpp)
- Beam: 51 ft 2 in (15.60 m)
- Draft: 28 ft (8.5 m)
- Propulsion: coal-fired boilers; 1 × triple-expansion steam engine; 1 × screw propeller
- Speed: 12 knots (22 km/h)
- Capacity: Cargo: 376,699 cubic feet (10,667 m^{3})
- Complement: 70 (as USS American)
- Notes: Sister ships: Hawaiian, Oregonian, Californian

SS American was a steel-hulled, single propeller cargo ship built at Chester, Pennsylvania, by the Delaware River Iron Shipbuilding and Engine Works for the American-Hawaiian Steamship Company and the Hawaiian sugar trade. During World War I service for the United States Navy, the ship was known as USS American (ID-2292). Late in her career for American-Hawaiian, she was renamed SS Honolulan.

American was a little more than 430 feet (130 m) long and 51 feet (16 m) abeam. Coal-fired boilers powered a single triple-expansion steam engine which turned a single screw propeller. This power plant—supplemented with auxiliary sails—was capable of moving the ship at up to 12 knots (22 km/h). As one of the first four ships ordered by the American-Hawaiian Steamship Company after its 1899 formation, American was used on the Hawaii – New York sugar trade via the Straits of Magellan. In 1901 she set a record for the fastest New York – San Francisco ocean passage, making the voyage in 59 days. After 1905, she was employed in inter-coastal service via the Isthmus of Tehuantepec and, after it opened in 1914, the Panama Canal.

Taken up for wartime service after the United States entered World War I in April 1917, she completed two round-trip voyages to France without incident. Shortly after the start of her third such voyage, however, she collided with another U.S. Navy vessel, USS West Gate, sinking that vessel with the loss of seven of her crew in October 1918. She completed one more round trip in U.S. Navy service, sailing to Gibraltar after the Armistice in November. She returned to New York in February 1919, was decommissioned, and returned to American-Hawaiian.

SS American resumed cargo service with American-Hawaiian after her return from naval service, being renamed Honolulan in 1925. She was sold in 1926 and taken to Osaka where she was broken up sometime after her arrival there in November that same year.

== Design and construction ==
The American-Hawaiian Steamship Company, shortly after its March 1899 formation, placed orders for its first four ships for the company's planned sugar service between Hawaii and the East Coast of the United States. Three ships—American, Hawaiian, and Oregonian—were ordered from Delaware River Shipbuilding in Chester, Pennsylvania, while the fourth—Californian—was ordered from Union Iron Works of San Francisco. The contract cost of the three Pennsylvania-built ships was set at $425,000 each, but financing costs drove the final cost of each ship higher; the final cost of American was $61.00 per deadweight ton, which totaled just under $540,000.

American (Delaware River yard no. 308) was launched on 14 July 1900, and delivered to American-Hawaiian in October, joining Californian in the American-Hawaiian Fleet. (Note: Californian had been completed in June 1900.) American, the first of the trio of Pennsylvania ships to be completed, was 6,861 gross register tons (GRT), and was 430 feet 1 inch (131.09 m) in length and 51 feet 2 inches (15.60 m) abeam. She had a deadweight tonnage of 8,850 LT DWT, and her cargo holds had a storage capacity of 376,699 cubic feet (10,666.9 m^{3}). American had a speed of 12 knots (22 km/h), and was powered by a single triple-expansion steam engine with coal-fired boilers, that drove a single screw propeller. American and her sister ships, equipped with two upright masts, carried and used two large trysails, a fore staysail and jib, and a main staysail, to help conserve coal for their journeys.

== Early career ==
At the start of her American-Hawaiian career, American sailed in scheduled service from New York and Philadelphia around South America via the Straits of Magellan, up to San Francisco and from there to Honolulu. Along the way, she was refueled with coal at Saint Lucia in the British West Indies and at Coronel in Chile. The Chilean coal was often of lesser quality which burned too quickly and dangerously sent sparks flying from the ship's funnel; the quality and fire danger were key reasons that all subsequent American-Hawaiian ships used oil instead of coal for fuel.

The early American-Hawaiian voyages averaged about 70 days in each direction from New York to San Francisco, which was about 55 days shorter than the typical time required for sailing ships. Insurers initially made the company pay a 6% premium for taking its large ships through the treacherous 300-nautical-mile (560 km) channel in the Straits of Magellan, rather than the safer passage around Cape Horn. But by 1903, American-Hawaiian's safe operation and experience on the route allowed the company to negotiate a 3½% rate, just a ½% surcharge over the standard rate of 3%. The experience on the route also paid off in shorter transit times: American set a record time with a 59-day New York-to-San Francisco passage in 1901. However, typical times for the trip were just over 50 days by 1903.

In May 1905, after two years of negotiations, American-Hawaiian signed a contract with the Tehuantepec National Railway of Mexico, abandoning the Straits of Magellan route in favor of the Tehuantepec Route. Shipments on the Tehuantepec Route would arrive at Mexican ports—Salina Cruz, Oaxaca, for eastbound cargo, and Coatzacoalcos, Veracruz, for westbound cargo—and would traverse the Isthmus of Tehuantepec, Mexico's narrowest point, on the railroad. Eastbound shipments were primarily sugar and pineapple from Hawaii, while westbound cargoes were more general in nature.

After the United States occupation of Veracruz on 21 April 1914 (which found six American-Hawaiian ships in Mexican ports), the Huerta-led Mexican government closed the Tehuantepec National Railway to American shipping. This loss of access, coupled with the fact that the Panama Canal was not yet open, caused American-Hawaiian to return to its historic route of sailing around South America via the Straits of Magellan in late April. With the opening of the Panama Canal on 15 August, American-Hawaiian ships switched to taking that route. In October 1915, landslides closed the Panama Canal and all American-Hawaiian ships, including American, returned to the Straits of Magellan route again.

American's exact movements from this time through early 1917 are unclear. She may have been in the half of the American-Hawaiian fleet that was chartered for transatlantic service. She may also have been in the group of American-Hawaiian ships chartered for service to South America, delivering coal, gasoline, and steel in exchange for coffee, nitrates, cocoa, rubber, and manganese ore. However, when the United States entered World War I in April 1917, the entire American-Hawaiian fleet, including American, was requisitioned by the United States Shipping Board (USSB), which then returned the ships for operation by American-Hawaiian.

== U.S. Navy service ==
In May 1918, the USSB selected American for service carrying United States Army cargo to France as a part of the U.S. Navy's Naval Overseas Transportation Service (NOTS). On 22 May, American was turned over to the Navy and assigned the identification number of 2292. She was commissioned as USS American on 25 May. One week later, American, loaded with cargo, departed New York and joined up with an eastbound convoy on 2 June, reaching Brest, France, on 17 June. She sailed to Bordeaux via La Pallice to unload, and departed on 6 July, reaching New York 16 days later. After a quick turnaround, American sailed for Bordeaux again on 5 August and had arrived back at New York on 6 September.

=== Collision with West Gate ===
On 4 October, American began her third trip to France in a convoy escorted by the cruiser Denver and headed to Bordeaux. On the night of 6/7 October—noted in the Dictionary of American Naval Fighting Ships as "particularly dark and rainy"—the ships were having trouble maintaining their stations in the convoy; American was sailing in the column headed by the convoy's guide ship, Sagua.

At 02:28 on 7 October, while about 250 nautical miles (460 km) south of Halifax, the steering gear engine of USS West Gate—ahead and to the starboard of American—jammed, sending the ship veering sharply to the port. West Gate's crew put the ship's engine at half speed to try to drop out of the convoy, but minutes later, men on the bridge sighted the red light from the oncoming American. Though West Gate's bridge rang up "full speed ahead" to avoid the collision, there was not enough time for the engine to respond before American's bow cut into the starboard side of West Gate, near the poop deck.

American, which was lightly damaged by the collision, reversed her engine to back out of the tangle while West Gate's engine was shut down. After American was completely backed out, West Gate began rapidly settling and was ordered abandoned. A total of seven men from West Gate died in the accident—two when their lifeboat capsized, and a further five that probably died in the initial impact. West Gate's commanding officer, Lt. Cdr. R. B. Vandervoort, and six men he had personally escorted to a life raft were picked up by one of American's lifeboats at 06:00, after some 3½ hours in the water. The Dictionary of American Naval Fighting Ships does not report any casualties on American from the collision.

American proceeded to Halifax, where she had her collision damage repaired over the next six weeks. She departed for Gibraltar on 27 November, a little more than two weeks after the signing of the Armistice with Germany that ended the fighting. After calling at that British port on 9 December, American docked at Marseille, before leaving for New York in the new year, arriving there on 9 February 1919. American was decommissioned and returned to American-Hawaiian on 4 March, and formally struck from the Naval Vessel Register on 14 May.

== Later career ==
American resumed cargo service with American-Hawaiian after her return from World War I service. Though the company had abandoned its original Hawaiian sugar routes by this time, American sailed in inter-coastal service through the Panama Canal. In June 1925, American-Hawaiian announced its intent to acquire six steamers from W. R. Grace and Company. Later in the year, American was renamed Honolulan in order to free her name for the newly acquired Santa Barbara. In 1926, Honolulan was sold for scrap. She was taken to Osaka, Japan, and was broken up some time after her arrival there in November that same year.

== Bibliography ==
- Cochran, Thomas C.; Ray Ginger (December 1954). "The American-Hawaiian Steamship Company, 1899–1919". The Business History Review. 28 (4). Boston: The President and Fellows of Harvard College: 343–365. doi:10.2307/3111801. JSTOR 3111801. OCLC 216113867. S2CID 154716297.
- Hovey, Edmund Otis (1907). "The Isthmus of Tehuantepec and the Tehuantepec National Railway". Bulletin of the American Geographical Society. 39 (2). New York: American Geographical Society: 78–91. doi:10.2307/198380. JSTOR 198380. OCLC 2097765.
- Naval History & Heritage Command. "American". Dictionary of American Naval Fighting Ships. Navy Department, Naval History and Heritage Command.
- Naval History & Heritage Command. "West Gate". Dictionary of American Naval Fighting Ships. Navy Department, Naval History & Heritage Command.
