= USS West Coast =

Cargo ship of the United States Navy

History

United States
- Name: USS West Coast (ID-3315)
- Builder: Columbia River Shipbuilding Co.; Portland, Oregon
- Yard number: 7
- Laid down: as War Dagger
- Launched: 6 July 1918
- Completed: 9 August 1918
- Acquired: 9 August 1918
- Commissioned: 9 August 1918
- Decommissioned: 26 June 1919
- Stricken: 26 June 1919
- Fate: returned to USSB

History
- Name: SS West Coast
- Owner: United States Shipping Board (USSB)
- Acquired: Returned from US Navy, 9 June 1919
- Identification: US Official number: 217533
- Fate: Scrapped 1930

General characteristics
- Type: Design 1013 ship
- Tonnage: 5,689 GRT
- Displacement: 12,200 t
- Length: 409 ft 9 in (124.89 m) (LPP); 423 ft 9 in (129.16 m) (overall)
- Beam: 54 ft (16.5 m)
- Draft: 24 ft 6 in (7.47 m) (mean)
- Depth of hold: 29 ft 9 in (9.07 m)
- Propulsion: 1 × steam turbine; 1 × screw propeller
- Speed: 11 knots (20 km/h)
- Complement: 99
- Armament: None

USS West Coast (ID-3315) was a cargo ship for the United States Navy during World War I. The ship was laid down as SS War Dagger but launched in July 1918 as SS West Coast and reverted to that name at the end of her Navy service.

SS West Coast was a steam-powered for the United States Shipping Board (USSB) as part of the West boats, a series of steel-hulled cargo ships built on the West Coast of the United States for the World War I war effort. She was the 7th ship built by the Columbia River Shipbuilding Company in Portland, Oregon. She was commissioned into the Naval Overseas Transportation Service (NOTS) of the United States Navy in August 1918. After two transatlantic roundtrips, she was decommissioned in May 1919 and returned to the USSB.

Little is known of West Coast's subsequent civilian career. She was scrapped at Baltimore, Maryland in the fourth quarter of 1930.

== Design and construction ==
The West ships were cargo ships of similar size and design built by several shipyards on the West Coast of the United States for the USSB for emergency use during the First World War. All were given names that began with the word West, like West Coast, the 7th of some 30 West ships built by the Columbia River Shipbuilding Company of Portland, Oregon. West Coast (Columbia River Shipbuilding yard number 7) was launched on 6 July 1918, and was completed on 9 August 1918.

West Coast was 5,689 gross register tons (GRT), and was 409 feet 9 inches (124.89 m) long (between perpendiculars) and 54 feet (16.5 m) abeam. She had a steel hull that displaced 12,200 t with a mean draught of 24 feet 6 inches (7.47 m). Her hold was 29 feet 9 inches (9.07 m) deep. West Coast's power plant consisted of a single steam turbine driving a single screw propeller which moved the ship at up to 11 knots (20 km/h).

== U.S. Navy career ==
Upon completion of West Coast on 9 August 1918, she was handed over to the United States Navy for use in the NOTS. She was commissioned as USS West Coast (ID-3315) the same day.

West Coast departed the Pacific Northwest on 15 August, bound for Chile to take on a load of guano. The ship burned out a thrust-bearing in her turbine, however, and was forced to put into San Francisco on 17 August for extensive repairs which lasted until 7 December. Meanwhile, the Armistice ended World War I and curtailed the Allies' need for nitrates. Hence West Coast's voyage to Chile was cancelled, and the cargo vessel was ordered to proceed via the Panama Canal to Norfolk, Virginia. She entered Hampton Roads, Virginia, on the last day of 1918 and sailed for France on 6 January 1919. Arriving at Bordeaux on 21 January, West Coast discharged her cargo, loaded 1,994 tons of Army return cargo, and got underway for the United States on 16 February.

The cargo vessel reached Newport News, Virginia, and unloaded. She departed Hampton Roads on 18 March and arrived at New Orleans eight days later. After loading a cargo of cotton, she sailed on 3 April and returned briefly to Norfolk, before getting underway for England on 10 April. She unloaded her cotton cargo in Falmouth and Liverpool and departed the British Isles on 30 May. Calling at Norfolk from 12 to 15 June, West Coast proceeded for the Gulf of Mexico and made port at Galveston, Texas, on 22 June. Four days later, the cargo vessel was decommissioned and her name struck from the Navy list.

== Civilian career ==
Little is known of West Coast's post-Navy career. After her decommissioning, West Coast was returned to the USSB. Remaining in the custody of the USSB, she was scrapped at Baltimore in the fourth quarter of 1930.

== Bibliography ==
- Crowell, Benedict; Robert Forrest Wilson (1921). The Road to France: The Transportation of Troops and Military Supplies, 1917–1918. How America Went to War: An Account From Official Sources of the Nation's War Activities, 1917–1920. New Haven: Yale University Press. OCLC 18696066.
- This article incorporates text from the public domain Dictionary of American Naval Fighting Ships. The entry can be found here.
- Photo gallery of USS West Coast at NavSource Naval History
