= USS West Gate =

Cargo ship in United States navy

Coordinates: 40°35′N 63°48′W

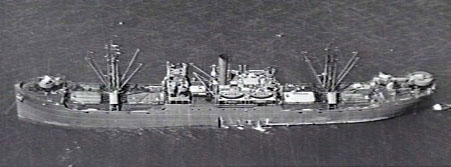
- West Gate had similar design and measurements to her Columbia River Shipbuilding sister ship West Corum (pictured above)

History

United States
- Name: USS West Gate (ID-3216)
- Builder: Columbia River Shipbuilding Co.; Portland, Oregon
- Yard number: 3
- Laid down: as War Agate
- Launched: 27 January 1918
- Completed: April 1918
- Acquired: 29 May 1918
- Commissioned: 29 May 1918
- Identification: U.S. official number: 216174
- Fate: Sunk in collision, 7 October 1918

General characteristics
- Type: Steam merchant ship
- Tonnage: 5,799 GRT
- Displacement: 12,185 t
- Length: 410 ft 1 in (124.99 m) (LPP); 423 ft 9 in (129.16 m) (overall)
- Beam: 54 ft (16.5 m)
- Draft: 24 ft 1 in (7.34 m) (mean)
- Depth of hold: 29 ft 9 in (9.07 m)
- Propulsion: 1 × steam turbine; 1 × screw propeller
- Speed: 10.5 knots (19.4 km/h)
- Complement: 74
- Armament: 1 × 5-inch (130 mm) gun; 1 × 6-pounder gun

USS West Gate (ID-3216) was a cargo ship for the United States Navy during World War I. The ship was laid down as SS War Agate, but she was launched in January 1918 as SS West Gate instead.

SS West Gate was one of the steam-powered West boats that were built for the United States Shipping Board (USSB). They were steel-hulled cargo ships built on the West Coast of the United States for the World War I war effort. She was the 3rd ship built by the Columbia River Shipbuilding Company in Portland, Oregon. She was commissioned into the Naval Overseas Transportation Service (NOTS) of the United States Navy in April 1918.

After experiencing engine trouble on her first attempt at a transatlantic crossing, West Gate was unsuccessfully attacked by two German submarines in early July 1918 while returning to port for repairs. After successfully completing her trip to France, she began her second transatlantic trip in early October. In the early morning hours of 7 October, West Gate's steering gear jammed and American, another Navy cargo ship, collided with the West Gate, sinking her. Seven men lost their lives in the accident.

== Design and construction ==
The ship was laid down at the Columbia River Shipbuilding Company of Portland, Oregon under the name War Agate as part of an order for the British Admiralty. Had she been sold to them, the War Agate would have been operated by the Cunard Line. However, the USSB commandeered and received title to all private shipbuilding projects in progress in mid-1917, which included the still-incomplete War Agate. The ship was renamed West Gate by the time of her launching on 27 January 1918. She was one of the West ships, which were cargo ships of similar size and design built by several shipyards on the West Coast of the United States for the USSB for emergency use during the First World War. All of the West ships were given names that began with the word West, and West Gate was the 3rd of some 30 West ships built at Columbia River Shipbuilding.

West Gate was 5,799 gross register tons (GRT), and was 410 feet 1 inch (124.99 m) long (between perpendiculars) and 54 feet (16.5 m) abeam. She had a steel hull that displaced 12,185 t with a mean draft of 24 feet 1 inch (7.34 m). Her hold was 29 feet 9 inches (9.07 m) deep. West Gate's power plant consisted of a single steam turbine driving a single screw propeller which moved the ship at up to 10.5 knots (19.4 km/h).

== Career ==
After her April 1918 completion, West Gate was handed over to the United States Navy for use in the NOTS. She was commissioned at Norfolk, Virginia, as USS West Gate (ID-3216) the same day.

After making her way to New York, West Gate took on 6,700 tons of cargo that included locomotives, steel rails, and other materiel for the United States Army and departed in a convoy for France on 28 June. The ship soon developed engine trouble and dropped out of the convoy to head to St. John's, Newfoundland, for repairs. While headed to St. John's in moderate seas under a cloudy sky, West Gate was attacked by two German submarines at 19:15 on 3 July. One U-boat surfaced in front of the cargo ship, crossing to starboard. As West Gate quickly turned to port to evade the U-boat, a second U-boat surfaced one point to starboard. While West Gate's radio operator sent out a preemptive SOS, her gunners opened fire on the two submarines. Though her gunners made hits on neither boat, both were bracketed with fire, quickly submerged, and apparently departed the scene. West Gate arrived at St. John's at 18:00 on 7 July without any further contact with enemy vessels.

After four days of repairs, West Gate departed St. John's for France and arrived at the Gironde estuary on 22 July. She shifted to Saint-Nazaire three days later where she unloaded her cargo. West Gate departed on 21 August for Newport News, Virginia, where she arrived on 10 September. Later in the month, she headed to New York for major engine repairs.

== Final voyage ==
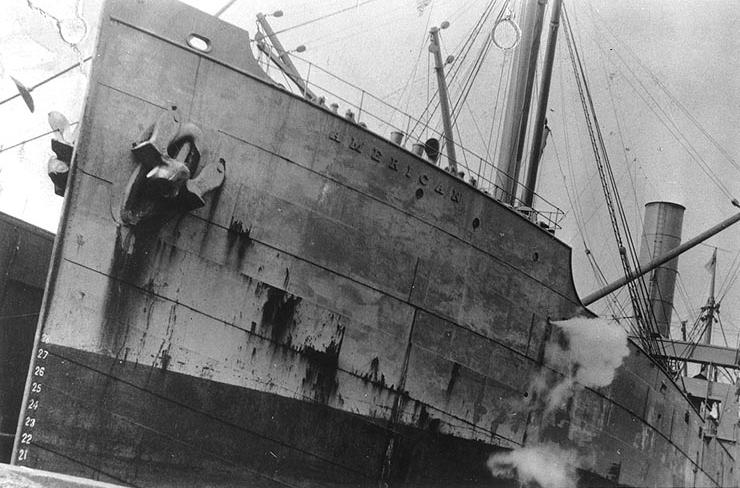
West Gate quickly sank after she was struck on her starboard side by the bow of USS American (pictured above).

After taking on 7,187 long tons (7,302 t) of Army materiel, she departed for Bordeaux on 4 October in a convoy escorted by cruiser Denver. On the night of 6/7 October—noted in the Dictionary of American Naval Fighting Ships as "particularly dark and rainy"—the ships were having trouble maintaining their stations in the convoy. West Gate was sailing in the first column to the starboard of the guide ship, Sagua.

At 02:28 on 7 October, while about 250 nautical miles (460 km) south of Halifax, West Gate's steering gear engine jammed, sending the ship veering sharply to the port. The crew put the ship's engines at half speed to try to drop out of the convoy. Lieutenant Spencer, the chief engineer, and his assistant, Lieutenant (j.g.) Hillery, headed to the machinery spaces to see about effecting repairs. At 02:30, men on the bridge sighted the red light from the oncoming American, which had been steaming behind and to the port of West Gate. Though the bridge ordered the engines raised to "full speed ahead" to avoid the collision, there was no time for the engines to respond before American's bow cut into the starboard side of West Gate, near the poop deck.

West Gate's engines were shut down while American backed out of the tangle. (Note: USS American suffered damage but safely reached Halifax to undergo repairs. The Dictionary of American Naval Fighting Ships does not report any casualties on American from the collision. See: Naval Historical Center. "American". DANFS.) West Gate quickly began to settle and the order to abandon ship was issued. The chief engineer and his assistant, Spencer and Hillery, remained belowdecks long enough to extinguish the boilers and open safety valves to prevent the explosion of the boilers. They finished the task just before the aft bulkhead gave way to the inrushing seawater. Both arrived on deck in time to board lifeboat number 2, which had been held as long as possible for men in the after part of the ship.

Chief Gunner's Mate Michael B. Wallrath, who had assisted in lowering three lifeboats while he remained on board, jumped overboard after seeing to it that all the boats were away. Wallrath was pulled into lifeboat number 6 just before a wave capsized it and drowned two of its occupants. Lieutenant commander R. B. Vandervoort, USNRF, West Gate's commanding officer, remained on board until he felt sure that the entire crew had departed the sinking ship. When he climbed up on the deckhouse to cut free a life raft and leave the ship, he discovered six men huddled on deck. Vandervoort was able to get the six on the life raft, but the suction caused by West Gate's final plunge pulled him away and below the surface. After he managed to get back to the surface, he clung to floating wreckage for two hours until pulled aboard the very raft he had missed earlier. Vandervoort and the six men aboard the raft were rescued by one of American's lifeboats at 06:00, after some 3½ hours in the water.

A total of seven men from West Gate, two from lifeboat six and five others probably killed in the initial collision, lost their lives in the accident. The U.S. Navy awarded Chief Gunner's Mate Wallrath a Letter of Commendation for his actions during the sinking of West Gate.

== Bibliography ==
- Crowell, Benedict; Robert Forrest Wilson (1921). The Road to France: The Transportation of Troops and Military Supplies, 1917–1918. How America Went to War: An Account From Official Sources of the Nation's War Activities, 1917–1920. New Haven: Yale University Press. OCLC 18696066.
- Naval Historical Center. "American". Dictionary of American Naval Fighting Ships. Navy Department, Naval History and Heritage Command.
- Naval Historical Center. "West Gate". Dictionary of American Naval Fighting Ships. Navy Department, Naval History & Heritage Command.
- Stringer, Harry R. (1921). The Navy Book of Distinguished Service. Washington, D.C.: Fassett Pub. Co. OCLC 2654351.
