= Columbia River Shipbuilding Company =

Shipyard in Portland, Oregon, U.S.

Coordinates: 45.50603°N 122.67048°W

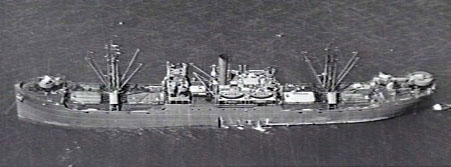
West Corum, one of the "West" boats built by the Columbia River Shipbuilding Company

The Columbia River Shipbuilding Company was a small shipyard in Portland, Oregon, United States, located on the west bank of the Willamette River. The shipyard was located at the foot of SW Sheridan Street, just upstream of the Interstate 5 Marquam Bridge, directly adjacent to the Northwest Steel shipyard.

The owners of Columbia River Shipbuilding were A. F. Smith and J. Frank Watson, who were also owners of The Smith and Watson Iron Works. The shipyard was managed by Charles D. Bowles, who was also associated with J. F. Duthie Shipbuilding of Seattle, Washington. Columbia River Shipbuilding was established in 1918 to build cargo ships for the United States Shipping Board (USSB). The shipyard closed shortly after the end of World War I.

At the time of its operation, the plant was held in high regard in the industry and held a high level of workmanship. The work environment was safe and fostered loyalty and camaraderie. At its peak, the plant had 8,500 persons on the payroll and was delivering two ships a month. In May 1918, the plant delivered three ships. The steamer War Bullet/West Grove with a gross tonnage of 5,688, was launched in 61 days and at the time, was the fastest time that any U.S. shipyard had built. The City of Eureka/West Harma, with a gross tonnage of 6,280, was built in the shortest amount of time. It was nicknamed 'the wonder ship,' as it was built in 27 days and launched ten days later.

The shipyard built not just the ships, but nearly everything that went into them, including their furniture. The machinery was made at The Smith and Watson Iron Works, but the woodwork was handled by the joiner shop, the forgings were made at the blacksmith, the boilers, heat exhangers, smokestacks, uptakes, and breathings were made in the boiler shop. The company made 281,600 tonnage of ships in total.

Most of the 32 ships built by the Columbia River Shipbuilding Company were the West boats, a series of 5,600-gross register ton (GRT) steel-hulled cargo ships built for the USSB on the West Coast of the United States as part of the World War I war effort. The first ship built at Columbia River Shipbuilding was the cargo ship Westward Ho; the final ship to be delivered was the cargo ship West Hassayampa, which was delivered in January 1920.

== Notable ships built by Columbia River Shipbuilding ==
- Anzan Maru
- SS Circinus
- SS City of Eureka (1919)
- SS Corvus (1919)
- SS Empire Miniver
- SS Empire Moorhen
- SS Empire Panther
- SS Empire Turnstone
- SS Michigan
- SS Mount Evans (1919)
- Tazan Maru
- USS West Coast (ID-3315)
- USS West Corum (ID-3982)
- USS West Gate (ID-3216)
- SS West Guechee
- SS West Hardaway
- SS West Harts (1919)
- SS West Imboden
- USS West Indian (ID-3120)
- SS West Munham
- SS West Nosska (1919)
- SS West Togus
- USS Western Belle (ID-3551)
- USS Western Plains (ID-3741)
- USS Westward Ho (ID-3098)
