= USS West Corum =

Cargo ship in United States Navy

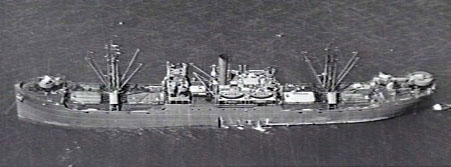
- Will H. Point, seen here in August 1943, was a United States Army transport ship during World War II. The ship was previously named West Corum.

History

United States
- Name: USS West Corum (ID-3982)
- Builder: Columbia River Shipbuilding Co.; Portland, Oregon
- Yard number: 13
- Launched: 2 January 1919
- Completed: February 1919
- Acquired: 10 February 1919
- Commissioned: 10 February 1919
- Decommissioned: 9 June 1919
- Fate: Returned to USSB

History
- Name: SS West Corum
- Owner: 1919: USSB
- Acquired: Returned from US Navy, 9 June 1919
- Identification: US Official number: 2217533
- Fate: Transferred to the U.S. Army

United States
- Name: 1940: USAT West Corum; 1941: USAT Will H. Point
- Acquired: November 1940
- Fate: Sold for scrapping, July 1948

General characteristics
- Type: Design 1013 ship
- Tonnage: 5,795 GRT
- Displacement: 12,424 t
- Length: 410 ft 1 in (124.99 m) (LPP); 424 ft (129.2 m) (overall)
- Beam: 54 ft (16.5 m)
- Draft: 24 ft (7.3 m) (mean)
- Propulsion: 1 × steam turbine; 1 × screw propeller
- Speed: 10.5 knots (19.4 km/h)
- Complement: 82 (as USS West Corum, 1919)
- Armament: as USS West Corum, 1919: None; World War II: 1 × 3-inch (76 mm) gun; 4 × 20 mm AA guns

USS West Corum (ID-3982) was a cargo ship for the United States Navy in 1919. The ship was built as SS West Corum and reverted to that name at the end of her Navy service. During World War II, the ship was United States Army transport ship USAT West Corum, later renamed to Will H. Point (sometimes listed as William H. Point).

SS West Corum was a steam-powered ship built for the United States Shipping Board (USSB) as part of the West boats, a series of steel-hulled cargo ships built on the West Coast of the United States for the World War I war effort. She was the 13th ship built by Columbia River Shipbuilding Company in Portland, Oregon. She was commissioned into the Naval Overseas Transportation Service (NOTS) of the United States Navy in January 1919. After one overseas trips for the Navy, she was decommissioned in May 1919 and returned to the USSB.

Early in her civilian career, she sailed between New York City and Bordeaux, but later shifted to sailing to Antwerp. For most of the 1920s, West Corum sailed to Argentine ports. By 1939, West Corum had been laid up in New Orleans. In 1940, she was reconditioned, transferred to the United States Army, and renamed USAT Will H. Point. During World War II, the ship sailed primarily in the Pacific Ocean, calling at ports in Australia, Alaska, and the U.S. West Coast. Will H. Point was laid up in the reserve fleet in Astoria, Oregon, in January 1947 and sold for scrapping in July of that same year.

== U.S. Navy career ==
Upon completion of West Corum in February 1919, three months after the end of fighting in World War I, she was handed over to the United States Navy for use in the NOTS on 10 February. She was commissioned as USS West Corum (ID-3982) the same day.

West Corum took on a load of wheat flour and sailed on 24 February for the East Coast. (Note: The West ships, to avoid sailing empty to the East Coast, loaded grain products intended for European ports and sailed from the East Coast without unloading or transferring their cargo. To avoid extra handling of the cargo, the United States Shipping Board, by prior arrangement, received an equivalent amount of cargo space in foreign ships for other American cargos. See: Crowell and Wilson, pp. 358–59.) After transiting the Panama Canal, she arrived at Norfolk, Virginia, on 19 March. Sailing soon after, she headed for Constantinople, Turkey, where she delivered her cargo on 18 April. On 1 May, West Corum set out from Constantinople for the United States via Gibraltar. She arrived in Norfolk on 6 June and was decommissioned three days later and returned to the USSB.

== Civilian career ==
Many details of West Corum's post-Navy career are unknown, but mentions in shipping reports in contemporary newspapers offer hints at her activities. The New York Times reports on West Corum's impending arrival from Bordeaux in October 1919, and from Antwerp in May and August 1920. By November 1920, West Corum had apparently begun sailing to Argentine ports.

Most newspaper mentions of West Corum do not report what sorts of cargo she carried, but a January 1922 Associated Press story in The Christian Science Monitor reveals her cargo for one voyage from Argentina. In what the news item said was the first full load of cargo leaving Buenos Aires in nearly a year, West Corum carried 107,000 animal hides, estimated to be enough for 1,000,000 pairs of shoes, along with consignments of wool and linseed. The ship continued calling at Buenos Aires and Santa Fe, Argentina, as late as 1927, but by 1939, West Corum had been laid up in a reserve fleet at New Orleans.

== World War II ==
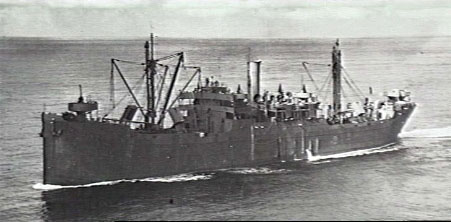
Will H. Point in February 1942

In June 1940, the United States Maritime Commission (USMC) opened bidding for the reconditioning of ten laid up cargo ships, which included West Corum. (Note: The other nine laid up ships selected for reconditioning were Waukegan, West Honaker, Deer Lodge, West Celeron, Vincent, Siletz, West Cheswald, Mount Evans, and West Segovia. (See ref #13)) According to the Los Angeles Times, the USMC, a successor to the USSB, was forced to act because of a "critical shortage" of U.S. Navy auxiliary ships. Though there is no specific information available regarding West Corum, the cost of reconditioning West Honaker, another of the laid up West boats, was $77,777. In November, West Corum was one of different group of ten ships taken up by the United States Army for defense service. (Note: The other nine ships taken up by the United States Army were Chirikof, Etolin, Liberty, Waukegan, Edenton, West Segovia, America, President Roosevelt, and President Jefferson. (see ref #4))

The ship's movements under Army control are largely unknown, but in January 1941, The New York Times reported that USAT West Corum had arrived in New York from Puerto Rico. Between February and March 1941, the ship was renamed USAT Will H. Point (though some sources indicate William H. Point instead) in honor of a former officer in the Quartermaster Corps.

Some other destinations for Will H. Point during her Army service are known. On 15 June 1941, the ship became the first ship to dock at the newly completed port facilities at Anchorage, Alaska. From September 1943 to January 1944, Will H. Point sailed between ports in Australia and New Guinea. Sailing mostly in convoys, Will H. Point visited Gladstone, Brisbane, Caloundra, Townsville, and Milne Bay.

After the war's end, Will H. Point is listed in the Chicago Daily Tribune as returning 11 U.S. Army personnel from Pearl Harbor to San Francisco in July 1946. The following January, Will H. Point entered the National Defense Reserve Fleet (NDRF) at Astoria, Oregon, and was withdrawn for scrapping in August.

== Bibliography ==
- Crowell, Benedict; Robert Forrest Wilson (1921). The Road to France: The Transportation of Troops and Military Supplies, 1917–1918. How America Went to War: An Account From Official Sources of the Nation's War Activities, 1917–1920. New Haven: Yale University Press. OCLC 18696066.
- Mighetto, Lisa; Carla Homstad (1997). Engineering in the Far North: A History of the U.S. Army Engineer District in Alaska, 1867–1992. Historical Research Associates. OCLC 37291726.
- "West Corum". Dictionary of American Naval Fighting Ships. Navy Department, Naval History and Heritage Command.
