= USS Californian =

Cargo ship of the United States Navy

Coordinates: 44.305°N 2.671°W

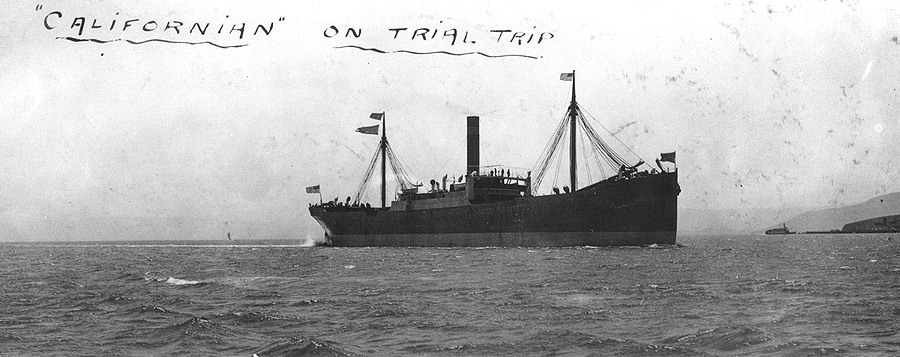
- SS Californian underway in San Francisco Bay on builder's trials in 1900.

History

United States
- Name: USS Californian
- Namesake: A resident of California (previous name retained)
- Builder: Union Iron Works, San Francisco, California
- Launched: 12 May 1900
- Completed: 1900
- Acquired: 13 May 1918
- Commissioned: 14 May 1918
- Fate: Sunk by naval mine 22 June 1918
- Notes: In commercial service as SS Californian 1900-1918

General characteristics
- Type: Cargo ship
- Tonnage: 5,658 Gross register tons
- Length: 413 ft (126 m)
- Beam: 51 ft (16 m)
- Draft: 26 ft 2 in (7.98 m) (mean)
- Propulsion: Steam engine
- Speed: 10 knots
- Complement: 78

USS Californian was a United States Navy cargo ship in commission in 1918.

SS Californian was launched on 12 May 1900 at San Francisco, California, by Union Iron Works and delivered later that year to the American-Hawaiian Steamship Company of New York City. After the United States entered World War I, the United States Shipping Board acquired Californian for war service and transferred her to the U.S. Navy on 13 May 1918. The Navy commissioned her as USS Californian on 14 May 1918.

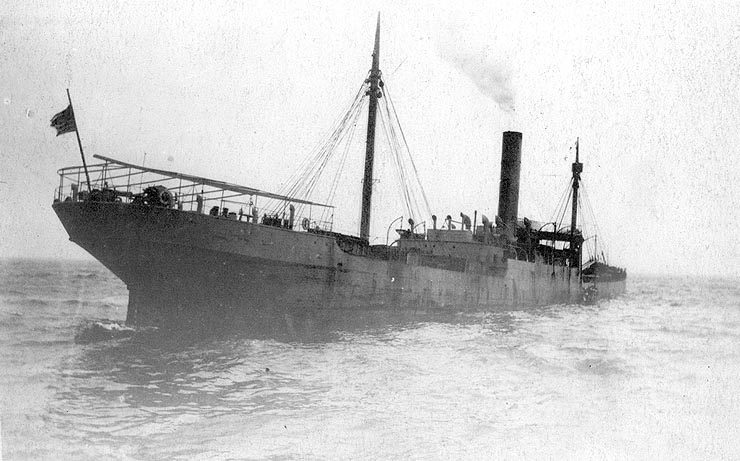
USS Californian sinking in the Bay of Biscay on 22 June 1918 after striking a naval mine.

Californian immediately loaded a cargo of coal, fuel oil, and general supplies for the American Expeditionary Force in France and departed on 31 May 1918 to join a convoy off New York City.

On 22 June 1918, while proceeding through the Bay of Biscay, Californian struck a naval mine. Although an attempt was made to tow her to port, she sank later that day. Her crew abandoned ship in good order and was picked up by the patrol vessel USS Corsair (SP-159) without suffering any casualties.

Unlike most commercial ships commissioned into U.S. Navy service during World War I, Californian never received a naval registry identification number.
