= SS Empire Miniver =

British steam merchant ship

Coordinates: 56°40′N 10°45′W

- Empire Miniver under her previous name of West Cobalt

History

United States
- Name: USS West Cobalt
- Builder: Columbia River Shipbuilding Co.; Portland, Oregon
- Yard number: 11
- Launched: 26 October 1918
- Completed: December 1918
- Commissioned: January 1919
- Decommissioned: 5 May 1919
- Identification: Hull number: ID-3836
- Fate: Returned to USSB

History
- Name: 1919: SS West Cobalt; 1940: SS Empire Miniver
- Owner: 1919: United States Shipping Board; 1933: Lykes Brothers Steamship Company; 1940: Ministry of War Transport
- Operator: 1933–1940: Lykes Brothers Steamship Company; 1940: Andrew Weir & Co, London
- Port of registry: 1919–1940: United States; 1940: United Kingdom
- Acquired: Returned from US Navy, 5 June 1919
- Identification: US Official number: 217341; UK official number: 167629
- Fate: Sunk on 18 October 1940

General characteristics
- Type: Design 1013 ship
- Tonnage: 5,724 GRT
- Displacement: 12,424 t
- Length: 410 ft 1 in (124.99 m) (LPP); 423 ft 9 in (129.16 m) (overall)
- Beam: 54 ft 0 in (16.46 m)
- Draught: 24 ft 2 in (7.37 m) (mean)
- Depth of hold: 29 ft 9 in (9.07 m)
- Propulsion: 1 × steam turbine; 1 × screw propeller
- Speed: 11 knots (20 km/h)
- Complement: 78 (as USS West Cobalt, 1919)
- Crew: 38 (as SS Empire Miniver, 1940)
- Armament: None (as USS West Cobalt, 1919)

SS Empire Miniver was a British steam merchant ship. She was originally an American merchant, launched in 1918 as SS West Cobalt. During a brief stint in the United States Navy in 1919, she was known as USS West Cobalt (ID-3836).

SS West Cobalt was built as a steam-powered cargo ship in 1918 for the United States Shipping Board (USSB). She was part of the "West" boats, a series of steel-hulled cargo ships built on the West Coast of the United States for the First World War war effort, and was the 11th ship built at Columbia River Shipbuilding Company in Portland, Oregon. Though she was completed too late for the war, she was commissioned into the Naval Overseas Transportation Service (NOTS) of the United States Navy as USS West Cobalt (ID-3836) in January 1919. After her one overseas trip for the Navy—delivering grain products to Danzig—she was decommissioned in May 1919 and returned to the USSB.

West Cobalt had a relatively uneventful merchant career for the USSB and, after her 1933 sale, for the Lykes Brothers Steamship Company. In June 1940, West Cobalt was sold to British interests and renamed Empire Miniver. Just over four months later, the ship was torpedoed and sunk by the German submarine U-99 while carrying supplies to the UK in Convoy SC 7 during the Second World War. Three crewmen were killed in the attack; the master and 34 others were rescued by a British corvette.

== Design and construction ==
The "West" ships were cargo ships of similar size and design built by several shipyards on the West Coast of the United States for the USSB for emergency use during the First World War. All were given names that began with the word "West", like West Cobalt, the ninth of some 30 "West" ships built by the Columbia River Shipbuilding Company of Portland, Oregon. West Cobalt (Columbia River Shipbuilding yard number 11) was launched on 26 October 1918, and was completed in December.

West Cobalt was 5,724 gross register tons (GRT), and was 410 feet 1 inch (124.99 m) long (between perpendiculars) and 54 feet 0 inches (16.46 m) abeam. She had a steel hull that displaced 12,424 t with a mean draught of 24 feet 2 inches (7.37 m). Her hold was 29 feet 9 inches (9.07 m) deep and she had a deadweight tonnage of 8,028 DWT. West Cobalt's power plant consisted of a single steam turbine driving a single screw propeller which moved the ship at up to 11 knots (20 km/h).

== US Navy career ==
Upon completion of West Cobalt in December 1918, a month after the end of fighting in the First World War, she was handed over to the United States Navy for use in the NOTS. She was commissioned as USS West Cobalt (ID-3836) on 29 December at the Puget Sound Navy Yard in Bremerton, Washington.

After undergoing sea trials, West Cobalt sailed for San Pedro, California, on 11 January to load a cargo of grain on behalf of the American Relief Administration. (Note: The West ships, to avoid sailing empty to the East Coast, loaded grain products intended for European ports and sailed from the East Coast without unloading or transferring their cargo. To avoid extra handling of the cargo, the United States Shipping Board, by prior arrangement, received an equivalent amount of cargo space in foreign ships for other American cargos. See: Crowell and Wilson, pp. 358–59.) Six days later, West Cobalt headed for Norfolk, Virginia, where she arrived on 10 February. After fuel replenishment, West Cobalt sailed on 19 February for Plymouth, where she arrived on 11 March, the Hook of Holland, and Danzig. After delivering her cargo, used to help feed the hungry in the aftermath of the war, she steamed for New York on 8 April. After reaching New York on 24 April, West Cobalt was decommissioned on 5 May and returned to the USSB.

== Civilian career ==
Many details of West Cobalt's post-Navy career remain undiscovered, but mentions in shipping reports in contemporary newspapers offer hints at her activities. In 1924, for example, reports in The New York Times mention a departure from New York for Manchester on 27 August, and an arrival at Liverpool on 8 September. By 1930, West Cobalt was reported in The Washington Post as sailing on a New Orleans – London route. On 15 October of that year, the captain and four other officers of West Cobalt were arrested at New Orleans after 12 US quarts (11 L) of liquor—against the law under Prohibition—were found on board the ship. The five men were held under $1,000 bond each. (Note: No further information on the outcome of legal proceedings against the men was reported in the newspaper.)

In 1933, West Cobalt was sold to the Lykes Brothers Steamship Company, which assigned her to its Ripley Steamship Company subsidiary. During the 1930s, Lykes Brothers operated cargo ships between Gulf Coast and Caribbean ports, and though there is little specific information available regarding West Cobalt's movements, it is likely that she called at Gulf coast and Caribbean ports as well. One specific mention of the ship is found in a report in The New York Times in 1937, when the newspaper reported West Cobalt's arrival in New York on 30 October, ten days after sailing from New Orleans.

== Second World War ==
In June 1940, the United States Maritime Commission (USMC) granted permission to Lykes to sell West Cobalt and three other ships to the Bank Line of Glasgow for transfer to British registry. (Note: The other three ships were Western Queen, West Harshaw, and West Quechee.) West Cobalt, loaded with scrap iron, sailed from Hampton Roads, Virginia, on 28 June for Halifax. After arriving there on 2 July, West Cobalt sailed the next day in Convoy HX 55 for Liverpool. On the night of 15/16 July, West Cobalt dropped astern of the convoy and was last sighted at 01:00 by British merchant ship Loch Don. West Cobalt continued on, however, and reached Liverpool independently on 18 July.

The ship was transferred to the Ministry of War Transport, renamed Empire Miniver, and assigned to Andrew Weir & Co. of London for operation. She sailed from Liverpool in her first wartime convoy under her new name, Convoy OB 205, on 29 August 1940. The convoy dispersed the next day after coming under attack from at least four German submarines: U-59, U-38, U-60, and U-101. Though three ships from the convoy were sunk, two were damaged, and a sixth was a total loss, Empire Miniver arrived at Hampton Roads on 15 September, and at Baltimore two days later.

After a nine-day turnaround, Empire Miniver sailed independently to Sydney, Nova Scotia, with a cargo of 4,500 tons of pig iron and 6,200 tons of steel, arriving on 2 October. At Sydney, she joined the ill-fated Convoy SC 7, bound for Newport, for her return journey. The convoy had only a single escort to start with, the sloop Scarborough. The convoy was located by a wolfpack of U-boats from 16 October, and they quickly overwhelmed the convoy, sinking many of the ships. Empire Miniver was torpedoed and sunk by U-99 at 22:06 on 18 October, while some 100 nautical miles (190 km) west by south of Barra Head. Out of a total complement of 38, three crew members were lost. The master and 34 crew members were picked up by Bluebell and were landed at Greenock on 20 October. Including Empire Miniver, 20 ships—over half of the ships in Convoy SC 7—were sunk by 8 different U-boats.

== Bibliography ==
- Crowell, Benedict; Robert Forrest Wilson (1921). The Road to France: The Transportation of Troops and Military Supplies, 1917–1918. How America Went to War: An Account From Official Sources of the Nation's War Activities, 1917–1920. New Haven: Yale University Press. OCLC 18696066.
- Naval Historical Center. "West Cobalt". Dictionary of American Naval Fighting Ships. Navy Department, Naval History and Heritage Command.
