= HMS Nairana (D05) =

1943 Nairana-class escort carrier of the Royal Navy

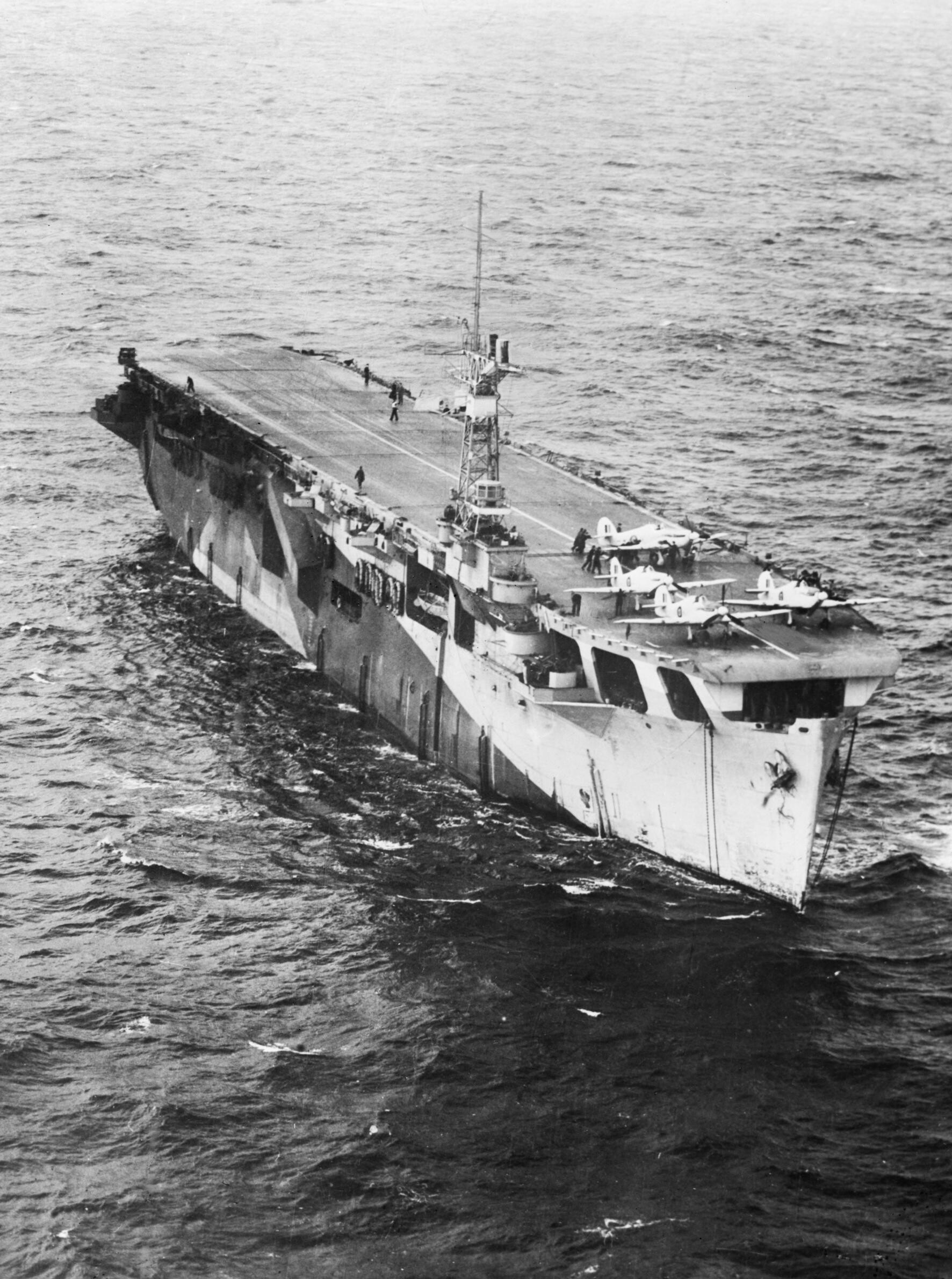
- HMS Nairana

History

United Kingdom
- Name: HMS Nairana
- Builder: John Brown & Company
- Laid down: 7 November 1941
- Launched: 20 May 1943
- Commissioned: 12 December 1943
- Decommissioned: 1946
- Identification: Pennant number D05
- Fate: Transferred to the Royal Netherlands Navy

Netherlands
- Name: HNLMS Karel Doorman
- Namesake: Karel Doorman
- Commissioned: 23 March 1946
- Decommissioned: 28 May 1948
- Fate: Returned to Royal Navy

United Kingdom
- Name: Port Victor
- Operator: Port Line
- Acquired: 1948
- Fate: Scrapped 1971

General characteristics
- Class & type: Nairana-class escort carrier
- Displacement: 14,050 long tons (14,275 t)
- Length: 528 ft 6 in (161.09 m)
- Beam: 68 ft 6 in (20.88 m)
- Draught: 21 ft (6.4 m)
- Installed power: 11,000 hp (8,200 kW)
- Propulsion: 2 × diesel engines; 2 × screws
- Speed: 17 kn (20 mph; 31 km/h)
- Complement: 728
- Armament: 2 × 4 in (100 mm) Mk XVI guns; 16 × 2-pounder (40 mm (1.57 in)) "pom pom" anti-aircraft guns (4x4); 16 × 20 mm (0.79 in) anti-aircraft autocannons (8x2)
- Aircraft carried: 15–20
- Aviation facilities: Hangar; 231 ft × 61 ft (70 m × 19 m); 1 × lift; 45 ft × 34 ft (14 m × 10 m); 8 × arrester wires

HMS Nairana (/naɪˈrɑːnə/) was the lead ship of the Royal Navy's Nairana-class escort carriers that saw service in the Second World War. She was built at John Brown & Company shipyards in Clydebank, Scotland. When construction started in 1941 she was intended as a merchant ship, but was completed and launched as an escort carrier, entering service at the end of 1943.

Nairana operated escorting convoys and doing anti-submarine work in the Atlantic and Arctic theatres. On 26 May 1944, Royal Navy Sea Hurricanes operating from Nairana claimed the destruction of three Junkers Ju 290s during the defence of a convoy. This represented 10 percent of the total German inventory of the type. She survived the war, and in 1946 was transferred to the Royal Netherlands Navy as the Karel Doorman (QH1), the first Dutch aircraft carrier. In 1948, she was replaced in the Royal Netherlands Navy by another vessel of the same name. Nairana was returned to the Royal Navy, and sold to the Port Line company, becoming the merchant ship Port Victor.

== Design and description ==
The Nairanas were a class of three escort carriers built for the Royal Navy during the Second World War. Escort carriers were designed to protect convoys of merchant ships from U-boat and aircraft attack. Following the successful conversion and operation of Activity, the Admiralty decided to take over three more merchant ships while they were still under construction and convert them into escort carriers. The three ships chosen were being built at three different shipyards Harland and Wolff in Northern Ireland, Swan Hunter in England and John Brown & Company in Scotland. The prototype was built by John Brown who supplied the other two companies with copies of the plans. The three ships were supposed to be identical but in reality they were all slightly different.

HMS Nairana—built by John Brown was launched on 20 May 1943 and completed on 12 December 1943. She had a complement of 728 men and displaced 14,050 long tons (14,275 t). Her other dimensions were a length of 528 ft 6 in (161.09 m), a beam of 68 ft 6 in (20.88 m) and a draught of 21 ft (6.4 m). Her aircraft facilities included a 495 ft (151 m) flight deck, a hangar measuring 231 ft × 61 ft (70 m × 19 m), eight arrestor wires and an aircraft lift measuring 45 ft × 34 ft (14 m × 10 m).

She had a traditional rivetted hull, steel flight decks and a closed hangar. Propulsion was provided by diesel engines connected to two shafts giving 11,000 hp (8,200 kW), which could propel the ship at 17 kn (20 mph; 31 km/h). Her armaments concentrated on anti-aircraft (AA) defence and comprised two 4 in (100 mm) dual purpose guns on a twin mount, sixteen 20 mm (0.79 in) AA autocannons on eight twin mounts and sixteen 2-Pounder "Pom Pom" AA guns on four quadruple mounts. Aircraft assigned were either anti-submarine or fighter aircraft, which could be made up of a mixture of Hawker Sea Hurricanes, Grumman Martlets or Fairey Swordfish.

== Service history ==
Nairana was commissioned in December 1943, and moved to Gourock for working up. Nairana with 835 Naval Air Squadron Fleet Air Arm on board commenced flying exercises with Activity on 27 January 1944. Both carriers left the River Clyde on 29 January with the 2nd Escort Group under the command of Captain Frederic John Walker. They were to form a "hunter killer group" in the waters west of Ireland, providing cover for two southbound convoys OS 66 and KMS 70. Weather conditions had prohibited flying until 31 January. With clearer weather Nairana turned into the wind to send off her first anti-submarine patrol. At the same time, Wild Goose reported contact with a submerged U-boat on her ASDIC. Warning Nairana that she had just turned into danger, the carrier took avoiding action. U-592 was sunk by Wild Goose and Walker's own ship Starling, while a Fairey Swordfish from Nairana circled the area.

At the end of May 1944, Nairana sailed with the 15th Escort Group. Her air group was still 835 Naval Air Squadron equipped with nine Swordfish and six Sea Hurricanes. The Swordfish patrolled day and night and some contacts were made on the air to surface vessel radar (ASV). All the contacts came to nothing; it is now known the older model ASV in Nairana's Swordfish could be detected by receivers on board U-boats. In May, they escorted convoys SL 157 (Freetown to Britain) with MKS 48 (Mediterranean to Britain) and the next group SL 158 with MKS 49.

On 25 May, the convoys were located by German Junkers Ju 290 reconnaissance aircraft. From then until the next morning, they were driven off undamaged, but one Sea Hurricane failed to pull out of a dive killing the pilot. On 26 May 1944, shortly after daybreak, a Sea Hurricane piloted by Sub-Lieutenant Burgham from Nairana shot down Ju 290 9K+FK of FAGr 5 over the Bay of Biscay. The afternoon of the same day, Sub-Lieutenants Mearns and Wallis attacked two more Ju 290s, Mearns shooting down 9V+GK piloted by Kurt Nonneberg, which ditched in the sea. The other Ju 290 disappeared on fire into cloud and was assumed to have crashed.

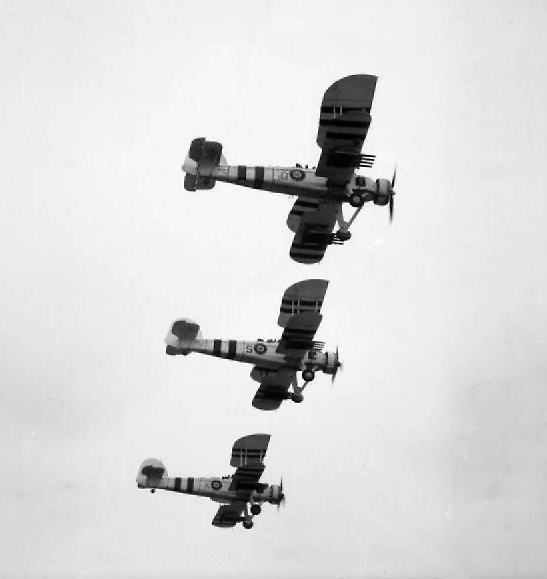
Three Fairey Swordfish armed with RP-3 rockets.

Russian convoy JW 61—which sailed on 20 October—had three escort carriers, Nairana, Vindex and Tracker. This was a large convoy of 62 merchant ships with a large escort group. Vice-Admiral Frederick Dalrymple-Hamilton was in command with Vindex as his flagship. Nairana had 835 Naval Air Squadron with 14 Swordfish IIIs and six Wildcat VIs on board for what would be their first Arctic convoy. Vindex had the same aircraft types and numbers. The third carrier—Tracker—had 10 Grumman Avengers and six Wildcats. The short Arctic days meant that most flying would be at night. The three carriers worked a system of eight-hour watches; one would be the duty carrier with its aircraft aloft, the second would be on standby with its aircraft arranged on deck ready to scramble and the third resting. The two Swordfish-equipped squadrons, because of their better night-flying equipment, shared the night hours while Tracker's Avengers worked the daylight hours.

The strength of the convoy's escort may have deterred the Germans and no U-boats or reconnaissance aircraft were detected until the convoy approached the Kola Inlet; even then the heavy escort prevented any attack and the convoy reached port safely. The return convoy RA 61 was equally as successful with only one frigate damaged by a torpedo just after leaving Kola and Vindex had to take avoiding action after detecting a torpedo coming towards her. Vindex's inexperienced squadron lost a Wildcat pilot when his plane crashed into the sea attempting to land back on board. A Swordfish crashed into the sea following a rocket-assisted take off with the loss of the two-man crew. Another Swordfish crashed on landing with the aircraft initially hung over the ship's side from its tail hook. When the hook gave way, it crashed into the sea and only the pilot was rescued. The squadron in total lost or so severely damaged eight Swordfish and two Wildcats that they could not fly again.

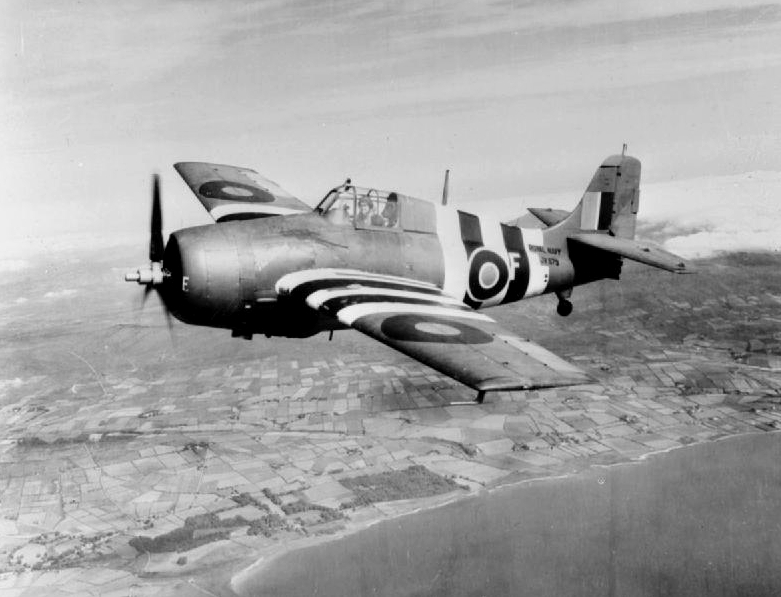
A Fleet Air Arm Grumman Wildcat.

On 6 February 1945, Nairana, Campania, the cruiser Bellona, and eight fleet destroyers joined 26 merchant ships in convoy JW64. This time, the squadrons had spare aircrews for their aircraft and Campania's squadron included a Fairey Fulmar fitted with a Royal Air Force A1 air-to-air interception radar, for use as a dedicated night fighter. Shortly after the escorts and convoy came together Campania's radar operator reported a target approaching. Both carriers scrambled two Wildcats to intercept the intruder. Campania's Wildcats arrived first and shot down a Junkers Ju 88; one of the Wildcats was also shot down with the loss of the pilot. The next morning at 07:45, Campania's radar detected aircraft approaching. Two groups of Junkers Ju 88 torpedo bombers appeared and the convoy's escorts opened fire. The ships manoeuvred to avoid the torpedo attack and Nairana's Wildcats were airborne by 08:10. No ships were hit during the attacks and the bombers evaded the fighters in the heavy cloud cover. Campania's Swordfish were flying the daylight anti-submarine patrols, with a mixed armament of four RP-3 rockets and two depth charges.

On 7 November 835 Squadron claimed a Junkers Ju 88 damaged. The long Arctic night with only four hours of light a day—together with heavy seas and low visibility—hampered operations by the Wildcats. In the darkness, the ships could hear the engines of the shadowing German aircraft closing in. Campania's night fighting Fulmar took off at 17:30, but its electrics failed as it was approaching the German aircraft and it was forced to return to the carrier. The Fulmar landed off centre and crashed into the safety barrier, putting itself and the carrier out of action. On 10 November, a Swordfish on anti-submarine patrol reported 30 Junkers Ju 88s approaching the convoy. The Wildcats took off to intercept the torpedo bombers and the escorts opened fire on them. The combined fire from the escorts and the Wildcats shot down four Ju 88s, two more were claimed as probables by the Wildcats, and another was severely damaged. Those Ju 88s that did release their torpedoes failed to hit any of the ships and a number of the torpedoes were seen to detonate in the ships' wakes, as they turned away from the attack. Two of the Wildcats were also shot down by the barrage from the escorts. The combined losses had reduced the escort's fighter cover to three aircraft, one on Campania and two on Nairana. At 11:30, another group of Ju 88 torpedo bombers were discovered approaching. Nairana's Wildcats took off and shot one down. The others, under fire from the escorts, dropped their torpedoes too soon and they all missed.

The return convoy RA 64 left Kola Inlet on the morning of 17 February. One of the escorts and a merchant ship were torpedoed almost immediately. Another merchant ship was torpedoed that afternoon. Terrible weather conditions kept all aircraft grounded until 20 February. When it began to clear, the Luftwaffe also appeared and the Wildcats were scrambled to intercept them. Two Ju 88s were shot down by the fighters, another two by the escorts, and three were damaged. The convoys had lost to enemy action two fighters, two escorts and two merchant ships. In return, they claimed 15 aircraft destroyed, seven aircraft probables and one U-boat sunk. Campania did one more Russian convoy JW 65 in March 1945, which had two merchant ships torpedoed and sunk on their approach to Kola Inlet. These were the last losses on a Russian convoy.

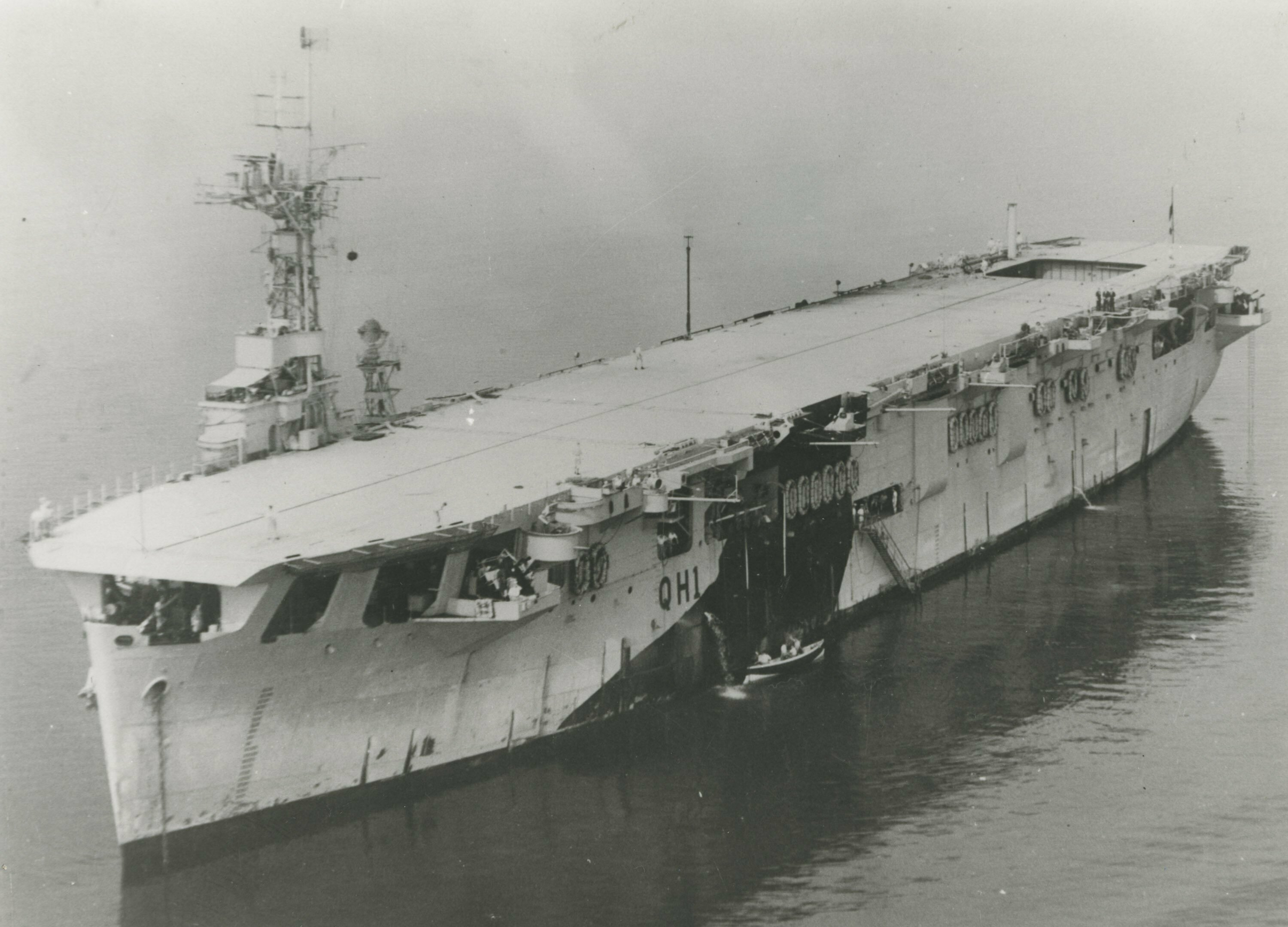
Karel Doorman (QH1) of the Royal Netherlands Navy.

With the war over there was no further need for escort carriers. Nairana was transferred to the Royal Netherlands Navy in 1946. In Dutch service, she was renamed HNLMS Karel Doorman. Before heading to the Netherlands, she and her crew performed training exercises in the British waters. After completing these exercises, Karel Doorman arrived on 5 July 1946 at the shipyard of Wilton-Fijenoord in the Netherlands. On 1 September 1946 she set course for the Dutch East Indies, with a stop at Simon's Town. She eventually arrived at Tandjong Priok on 13 October 1946. In 1947 she operated with Hawker Sea Fury fighters against communist insurgents in the Dutch East Indies. In 1948 she was converted into a merchantman named the Port Victor. Until March 1968, Port Victor was owned by the Cunard Line but managed by Blue Star Port Lines. She eventually became owned by Port Line in 1971; on 21 July, she was sent to Faslane to be scrapped.
