= Nairana-class escort carrier =

British-built class of escort carrier

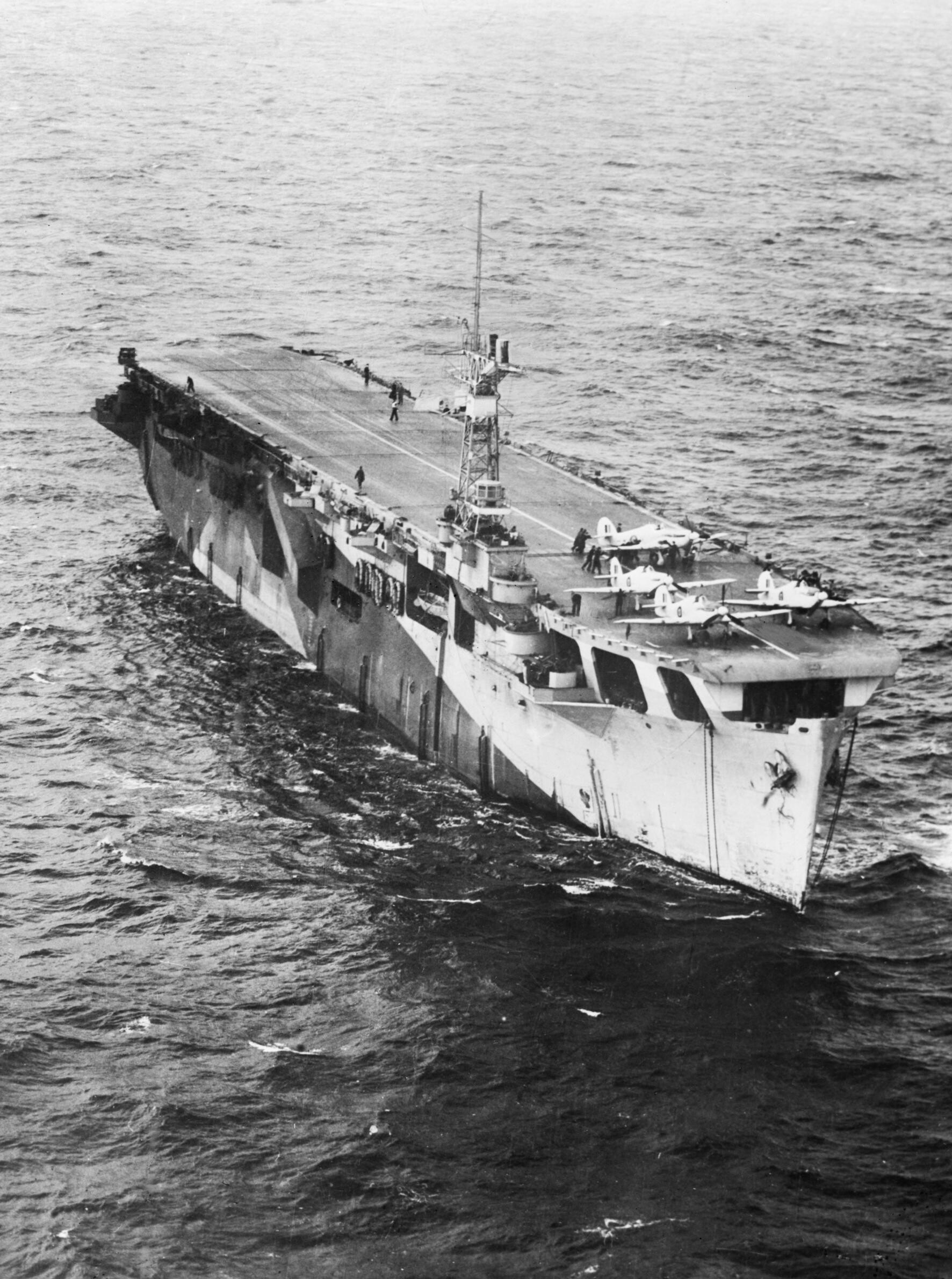
- HMS Nairana

Class overview
- Name: Nairana class escort carrier
- Builders: HMS Nairana, John Brown; HMS Campania, Harland and Wolff; HMS Vindex, Swan Hunter
- Operators: Royal Navy; Royal Netherlands Navy
- Preceded by: HMS Activity
- Succeeded by: Long Island-class escort carrier
- Built: 1941–1944
- In service: 1943–1955
- Planned: 3
- Completed: 3

General characteristics
- Type: Escort carrier
- Displacement: Campania 12,450 long tons (12,650 t); Nairana 14,050 long tons (14,280 t); Vindex 13,455 long tons (13,671 t)
- Length: Campania 540 ft (160 m); Nairana 528 ft 6 in (161.09 m); Vindex 524 ft (160 m)
- Beam: Campania 70 ft (21 m); Others 68 ft 6 in (20.88 m)
- Draught: Campania 19 ft (5.8 m); Others 21 ft (6.4 m)
- Installed power: 11,000 bhp (8,200 kW)
- Propulsion: 2 shaft diesel engines
- Speed: 17 knots (31 km/h; 20 mph)
- Complement: Campania 700; Nairana 728; Vindex 700
- Armament: 2 4 inch DP,AA guns on twin mount; 16 20 mm anti-aircraft cannons on twin mounts; 16 2 Pounder Pom Pom on quadruple mounts
- Aircraft carried: 15–20

The Nairana-class escort carrier (/naɪˈrɑːnə/) was a British-built class of three escort carriers. They were constructed one each in England, Scotland and Northern Ireland to the same basic design during the Second World War for service with the Royal Navy.

Converted from merchant ships, they were only able to accommodate a composite squadron of about 15–20 aircraft. Their armaments were mainly anti-aircraft weapons, with one twin 4 inch Dual Purpose, Anti Aircraft gun. One of the class, Campania, was the first British carrier to be fitted with an Action Information Organisation (AIO) and a Type 277 radar able to detect low-level aircraft.

Once completed the first carrier did not take part in active service until January 1944, but all three served as convoy escorts during the final year of the war. They had some success during their patrols, and anti-submarine Fairey Swordfish flying from their decks sank and damaged some German U-boats and their fighters succeeded in shooting down German long-range reconnaissance aircraft.

== Design and description ==
The Nairana-class escort carriers were a class of three escort carriers built for the Royal Navy during the Second World War. Escort carriers were designed to protect convoys of merchant ships from U-boat and aircraft attack. Following the successful conversion and operation of HMS Activity, the Admiralty decided to take over three more merchant ships while they were still under construction and convert them into escort carriers. The three ships chosen were being built at three different shipyards around the United Kingdom, Harland and Wolff in Northern Ireland, Swan Hunter in England and John Brown & Company in Scotland. The prototype was built by John Brown who supplied the other two companies with copies of the plans. The three ships were supposed to be identical but in reality they were all slightly different.

Nairana built by John Brown was launched on 20 May 1943 and completed on 12 December 1943. She had a complement of 728 men and displaced 14,050 long tons (14,280 t). Her other dimensions were a length of 528 ft 6 in (161.09 m), a beam of 68 ft 6 in (20.88 m) and a draught of 21 ft (6.4 m). Her aircraft facilities included a 495 ft (151 m) flight deck, a hangar 231 ft (70 m) by 61 ft (19 m), eight arrestor wires and an aircraft lift 45 ft (14 m) by 34 ft (10 m).

Vindex built by Swan Hunter was launched on 4 May 1943 and completed on 3 December 1943. She had a complement of 700 men and displaced 13,455 long tons (13,671 t). Her other dimensions were a length of 524 ft 0 in (159.72 m), a beam of 68 ft 6 in (20.88 m) and a draught of 21 ft (6.4 m). Her aircraft and her aircraft facilities included a 495 ft (151 m) flight deck, a hangar 231 ft (70 m) by 61 ft (19 m), six arrestor wires and an aircraft lift 45 ft (14 m) by 34 ft (10 m).

Campania built by Harland and Wolff was launched on 17 June 1943 and completed on 9 February 1944. She had a complement of 700 men and displaced 12,450 long tons (12,650 t). Her other dimensions were a length of 540 ft 0 in (164.59 m), a beam of 70 ft (21 m) and a draught of 19 ft (5.8 m). Her aircraft and her aircraft facilities included a 495 ft (151 m) flight deck, a hangar 198 ft (60 m) by 61 ft 6 in (18.75 m), six arrestor wires and an aircraft lift 45 ft (14 m) by 34 ft (10 m).

Common to all three ships was a traditional rivetted hull, steel flight decks and a closed hangar. They had the same propulsion provided by diesel engines connected to two shafts giving 11,000 brake horsepower (BHP), which could propel the ship at 17 knots (31 km/h; 20 mph). Their armaments concentrated on anti-aircraft (AA) defence and comprised two 4 inch Dual Purpose, AA guns on a twin mount, sixteen 20 mm anti-aircraft cannons on eight twin mounts and sixteen 2 Pounder Pom Pom on four quadruple mounts. Aircraft assigned were either anti-submarine or fighter aircraft, which could be made up of a mixture of the Hawker Sea Hurricane, Grumman Wildcat, Fairey Fulmar or Fairey Swordfish. The exact composition of the embarked squadrons depended upon the mission. Some squadrons were composite squadrons for convoy defence and would be equipped with anti-submarine and fighter aircraft, while other squadrons working in a strike carrier role would only be equipped with fighter aircraft.

== Service history ==
=== HMS Nairana ===
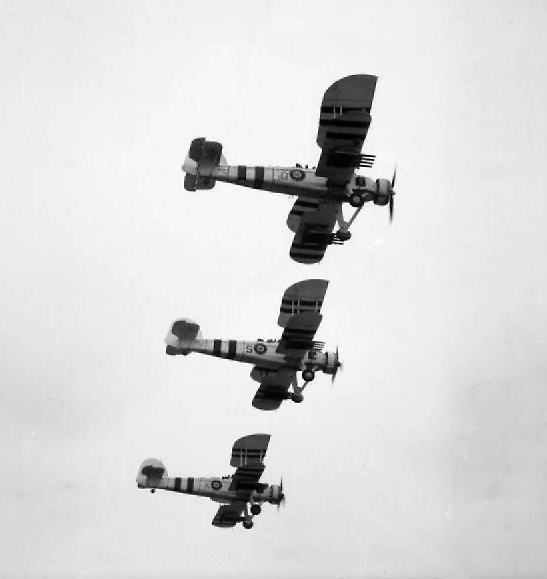
Three Fairey Swordfish armed with RP-3 rockets.

Vindex and Nairana were both commissioned within days of each other in December 1943, and moved to Gourock for working up. Nairana with 835 Naval Air Squadron Fleet Air Arm on board commenced flying exercises with HMS Activity on 27 January 1944. Both carriers left the River Clyde on 29 January with the 2nd Escort Group under the command of Captain Frederic John Walker. They were to form a "hunter killer group" in the waters west of Ireland, providing cover for two southbound convoys OS 66 and KMS 70. Weather conditions had prohibited flying until 31 January. With clearer weather Nairana turned into the wind to send off her first anti-submarine patrol. At the same time Wild Goose reported contact with a submerged U-boat on her ASDIC. Warning Nairana that she had just turned into danger, the carrier took avoiding action. The U-boat U-592 was sunk by Wild Goose and Walker's own ship Starling, while a Fairey Swordfish from Nairana circled the area.

By this stage of the war the Royal Navy had enough escort carriers available not only to double them up on a convoy escort but to permanently detach one to work with a "hunter killer group" operating outside the convoy system. The 2nd Escort Group still under the command of Walker was the group chosen with Vindex as the carrier. As she would not be supported by another carrier Vindex's air group was formed from the experienced 825 Naval Air Squadron, with a complement of 12 Fairey Swordfish Mk IIs and six Sea Hurricanes IICs. Even though there were 12 Swordfish on board they had only eight crews so the Sea Hurricanes carried out some of the daylight anti-submarine patrols. The Sea Hurricanes had been fitted with four racks for the same RP-3 rockets used by the Swordfish to attack submarines.

Leaving Northern Ireland on 9 March 1944, 2nd Escort Group moved to the area believed to hold the highest concentration of U-boats. Over the night of 12 March Swordfish on patrol had 28 contacts on their airborne to surface vessel radar (ASV). Their first attack was unsuccessful dropping two depth charges that failed to explode believed to be caused by faulty safety clips, during the attack the rear gunner in the Swordfish was killed by the U-boats anti-aircraft guns. The depth charges dropped short on a second attack and failed to explode on a third attack during the same night. On the night of 15 March two Swordfish got an ASV contact ahead of the escort group. Unable to see anything in the darkness they dropped flares and sea markers over the location. When the escort group arrived they picked up a contact on their ASDIC and the U-653 was sunk.

Weather conditions were still not perfect for flying and in the following days, one Swordfish returning from a night patrol landed in the sea alongside the carrier, the crew were reported missing believed killed. A pitching deck caused one Swordfish to crash into the sea on take-off and another Swordfish crashed into the sea on take-off when its engine failed. One Swordfish taking off clipped the island superstructure losing 4 feet (1.2 m) off both wing tips. The pilot managed to get the aircraft into the air circled around jettisoning his depth charges and landed again without mishap. Landing on the heaving deck was just as dangerous, two Sea Hurricanes and two Swordfish missed the arrestor wires and ended up crashing into the safety barriers. On 24 March 1944 a Swordfish with its engine shot up and crew injured attempted to land back on Vindex. It crash landed onto the flight deck coming to a stop 8 feet (2.4 m) from the end of the flight deck. Leaking petrol set the wreckage on fire, the crew were rescued but the fire exploded one of two depth charges stuck on their racks. A hole 8 feet (2.4 m) by 4 feet (1.2 m) was blown in the flight deck. After 16 days at sea Vindex returned to port. With two days flying lost because of the weather conditions, the Swordfish had amassed a creditable 275 flying hours and 122 deck landings by day and night. The Sea Hurricanes contributed another 47 hours flying and 39 deck landings.

At the end of May 1944 Nairana sailed with the 15th Escort Group. On board was 835 Naval Air Squadron equipped with nine Swordfish and six Sea Hurricanes. The Swordfish patrolled day and night and some contacts were made on the ASV. All the contact come to nothing, it is now known the older model ASV in Nairana's Swordfish could be detected by receivers on board U-boats. In May they escorted convoys SL 157 (Freetown to United Kingdom) with MKS 48 (Mediterranean to United Kingdom) and the next group SL 158 with MKS 49. From 25 May the convoys were located by German Junkers Ju 290 reconnaissance aircraft. On the 25 and the morning of 26 May they were driven off undamaged but one Sea Hurricane failed to pull out of a dive killing the pilot. Later the same day another two Ju 290s appeared one was shot down and the other was probably shot down. From 1946 to 1948, the ship was in service with the Royal Netherlands Navy as the HNLMS Karel Doorman (QH1).

=== HMS Vindex ===
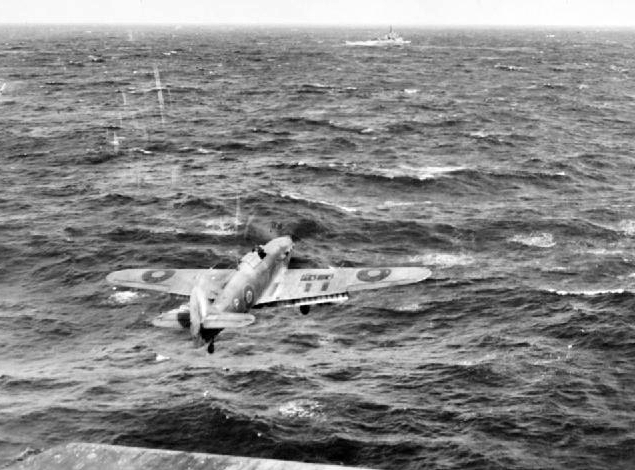
825 Naval Air Squadron Sea Hurricane takes off from HMS Vindex.

With Vindex damaged and needing a refit and Campania still not commissioned, Nairana was the only ship of her class fit for sea on 1 April 1944. She left in the first week of April with the outbound convoys OS 72 (West Africa) and KMS 46 (Gibraltar). She still had 825 Naval Air Squadron on board but this time she was overloaded with 18 aircraft: 12 Swordfish Mk IIs and six Sea Hurricanes IIcs. At the end of the month Vindex joined the 5th Escort Group. On 6 May a patrolling Swordfish was contacted by two of the escort frigates, who reported they were in contact with a submerged U-boat. The frigates carried out a depth charge attack and forced U-765 to the surface. The Swordfish despite the anti-aircraft fire from the U-boat dropped two of its depth charges which broke the submarine in half.

Flying became dangerous in the heavy seas and poor visibility. One Sea Hurricane was damaged beyond repair after a serious crash into the safety barrier and another crashed into the sea with the loss of the pilot. The Swordfish crews fared little better. Three aircraft and one crew were lost during the same period. On 9 May Vindex's aircraft lift broke down with a burnt out motor. The crew had to resort to manually cranking the lift up and down, taking an hour to go each way. They eventually repaired the lift by moving the capstan motor through holes burned into the bulkheads. During the second deployment by Vindex her aircraft flew over 400 sorties in 13 days. The strain on the aircrews began to show and only 35 per cent of the original Swordfish crews were still with the ship when they returned to port. It was during this second deployment that one of the ships officers, Sub-Lieutenant J.M. Morrison invented a blind landing system soon to be used on all the Royal Navy carriers. He modified an ASV radar set which was placed on the flight deck. The system employed the Air Directing Officer guiding aircraft to within 5 miles (8.0 km) of the ship. They could then be picked up on the ASV and brought in astern of the carrier at a height of 75 feet (23 m).

On 15 August 1944, Vindex and HMS Striker joined convoy JW 59 the first Arctic convoy to Russia of the year. Vindex still had 825 Naval Air Squadron on board but they were now equipped with the Swordfish Mk III. This version of the biplane had a Rocket-assisted take off system (RATOG) and a new ASV radar in a dome on the underside of the aircraft. The extra weight reduced the crew to two, doing away with the Telegraphist-Air-Gunner. There was a full complement of 12 Swordfish and eight Sea Hurricanes (two unassembled spares) on board. The larger Striker had 12 Swordfish and 12 Grumman Wildcats. The Swordfish claimed their first success on 22 August sinking U-354 and claimed another as possibly sunk. Her rocket armed Sea Hurricanes also claimed a U-boat damaged. Neither convoy JW 59 or the returning RA 59A lost any ships.

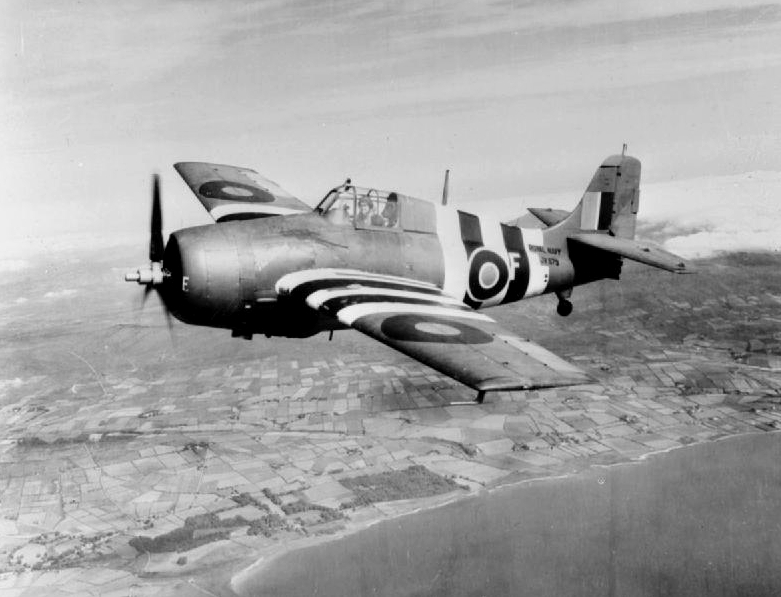
Fleet Air Arm Grumman Wildcat

Russian convoy JW 61 which sailed on 20 October had for the first time three escort carriers, Vindex, Nairana and HMS Tracker. This was a large convoy of 62 merchant ships with a large escort group. Vice-Admiral Frederick Dalrymple-Hamilton was in command with Vindex as his flagship. Nairana had 835 Naval Air Squadron with 14 Swordfish IIIs and six Wildcat VIs on board for what would be their first Arctic convoy. Vindex had a re-formed 811 Naval Air Squadron with the same aircraft types and numbers. The third carrier was HMS Tracker with 10 Grumman Avengers and six Wildcats. The short Arctic days meant that most flying would be at night. The three carriers worked a system of eight-hour watches. One would be the duty carrier with its aircraft aloft, the second would be on standby with its aircraft arranged on deck ready to scramble and the third resting. The two Swordfish equipped squadrons because of their better night flying equipment shared the night time hours while Trackers Avengers worked the daylight hours. The strength of the convoys escort may have deterred the Germans and no U-boats or reconnaissance aircraft were detected until the convoy approached the Kola Inlet. Even then the heavy escort prevented any attack and the convoy reached port safely.

The return convoy RA 61 was equally successful, with only one frigate damaged by a torpedo just after leaving Kola. Vindex had to take avoiding action after detecting a torpedo coming towards her. Vindex's inexperienced squadron lost a Wildcat pilot when his plane crashed into the sea attempting to land back on board. A Swordfish crashed into the sea following a rocket-assisted takeoff, with the loss of the two man crew. Another Swordfish crashed on landing, with the aircraft initially hung over the ship's side from its tail hook. When the hook gave way, it crashed into the sea and only the pilot was rescued. The squadron in total lost or so severely damaged eight Swordfish and two Wildcats that they could not fly again.

=== HMS Campania ===
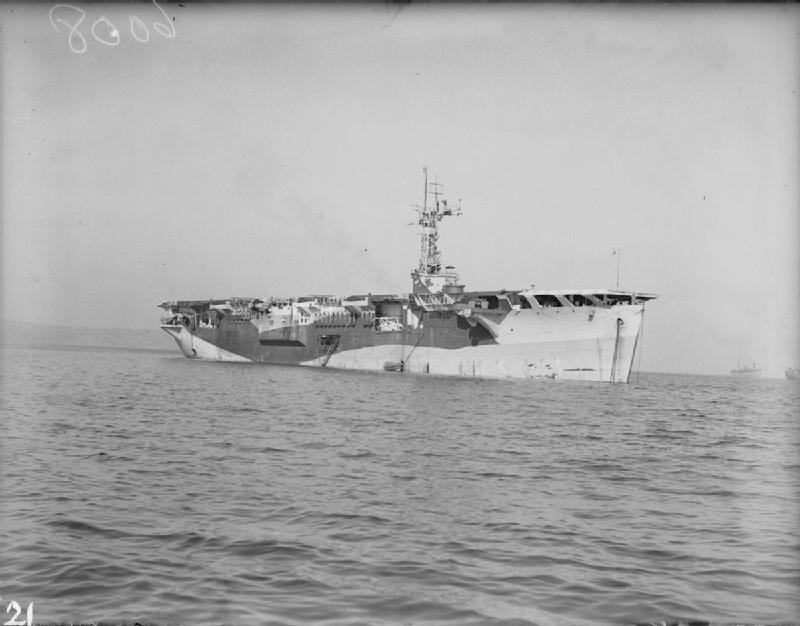
HMS Campania

Campania was commissioned in February 1944, her delay in construction meant she was the first British carrier to be fitted with Action Information Organisation (AIO) and a Type 277 Radar able to detect low-level aircraft. She had 813 Naval Air Squadron on board, equipped with 12 Swordfish Mk III, four Grumman Wildcats and three Fairey Fulmars. Her first convoy supported by the escort carrier Striker was the uneventful JW 60 to Russia. The return convoy RA 60 did have two merchant ships torpedoed for the loss of U-921. Between the two carriers five Swordfish and two Wildcats were lost. On 1 November 1944, Campania took part in Operation Golden convoys JW and RA 61A this was a small convoy with only the escorts and two passenger liners repatriating 11,000 Russians who were released prisoners of war. They left Russia 10 November with the liners bringing back Russian sailors, crews for ships being loaned to the Russian navy. Both journeys were relatively uneventful no U-boats interfered with their progress and the only action was the shooting down of two Blohm and Voss 138s by the Wildcats of 813 Naval Air Squadron. One Wildcat was lost when it crashed on take-off.

The normal Arctic convoys restarted at the end of November, Campania and Nairana were paired as part of the escort. Both ships still had their established squadrons on board 813 and 835, with Swordfish IIIs and Wildcat VIs. The first convoy JW and RA 62 were subjected to the first joint U-boat and torpedo bomber attacks since convoy PQ 18 two years previously. No ships in the convoy were lost but they did sink U-365 and shot down two Junkers Ju 88s and one Blohm and Voss 138. Two Swordfish and one Wildcat with the pilot were lost.

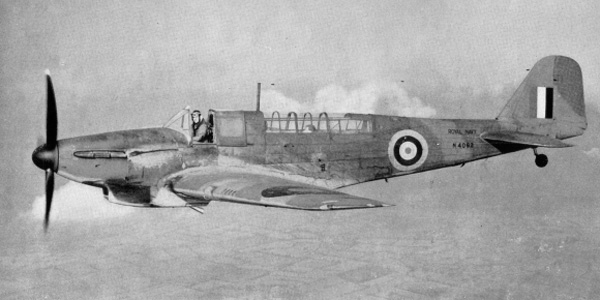
Fairey Fulmar

On 6 February 1945, Campania, Nairana, the cruiser HMS Bellona and eight fleet destroyers joined 26 merchant ships in convoy JW64. This time the squadrons had spare aircrews for their aircraft and Campania's squadron included a Fairey Fulmar fitted with a Royal Air Force AI air-to-air interception radar, for use as a dedicated night fighter. Shortly after the escorts and convoy came together Campania's radar operator reported a target approaching. Both carriers scrambled two Wildcats, to intercept the intruder. Campania's Wildcats got there first and shot down a Junkers Ju 88, one of the Wildcats was also shot down with the loss of the pilot. The next morning as 07:45 Campania's radar detected aircraft approaching. Two groups of Junkers Ju 88 torpedo bombers appeared and the convoys escorts opened fire. The ships manoeuvred to avoid the torpedo attack and Nairana's Wildcats were airborne by 08:10. No ships were hit during the attacks and the bombers evaded the fighters in the heavy cloud cover. Campania's Swordfish were flying the daylight anti-submarine patrols, with a mixed armament of four RP-3 rockets and two depth charges. On 7 November 835 Squadron claimed a Junkers Ju 88 damaged. The long Arctic night with only four hours of light a day together with heavy seas and low visibility hampered any operations by the Wildcats. During darkness the ships could hear the engines of the shadowing German aircraft closing in. Campania's night fighting Fulmar took off at 17:30, but its electrics failed as it was approaching the German aircraft and it was forced to return to the carrier. The Fulmar landed off centre crashed into the safety barrier putting itself and the carrier out of action. On 10 November a Swordfish on anti-submarine patrol reported 30 Junkers Ju 88s approaching the convoy. The Wildcats took off to intercept the torpedo bombers and the escorts opened fire on them. The combined fire from the escorts and the Wildcats shot down four Ju 88s, two more were claimed as probably shot down by the Wildcats and another was severely damaged. Those Ju 88s that did release their torpedoes failed to hit any of the ships and a number of the torpedoes were seen to detonate in the ships wakes, as they turned away from the attack. Two of the Wildcats were also shot down by the barrage from the escorts. The combined losses had reduced the escorts fighter cover three aircraft, one on Campania and two on Nairana at 11:30 another group of Junkers Ju 88 torpedo bombers were discovered approaching. Nairana's Wildcats took off and shot one down the others under fire from the escorts dropped their torpedoes too soon and they all missed. The return convoy RA 64 left Kola Inlet on the morning of 17 February, one of the escorts and a merchant ship were torpedoed almost immediately. Another merchant ship was torpedoed that afternoon. Terrible weather conditions kept all aircraft grounded until 20 November, when it began to clear the Luftwaffe also appeared and the Wildcats were scrambled to intercept them. Two Ju 88s were shot down by the fighters another two by the escorts and three were damaged. The convoys had lost to enemy action two fighters, two escorts and two merchant ships. In return they claimed 15 aircraft destroyed, seven aircraft probably destroyed and one U-boat sunk. Campania did one more Russian convoy JW 65 in March 1945, which had two merchant ships torpedoed and sunk on their approach to Kola Inlet. These were the last losses on a Russian convoy.

=== Later careers ===
With the war over there was no further need for escort carriers. HMS Nairana was transferred to the Royal Netherlands Navy in 1946. In Dutch service she was renamed the HNLMS Karel Doorman until 1948 when she was converted back into a merchantman named the Port Victor. HMS Vindex was sent out to the Far East as the flagship for Rear Admiral Cunninghame Graham. On her return she was placed in reserve and bought back by her original owner the Port Line. She was renamed Port Vindex and converted into a refrigerated cargo ship on the United Kingdom to Australia route. HMS Campania, still in escort carrier configuration, toured around the ports of Europe as the Festival of Britain ship in 1951. In October 1952, she carried the equipment to the Montebello Islands for Operation Hurricane, the first British nuclear weapons test on 3 October 1952. She returned to Britain in December 1952, and was broken up at Blyth in November 1955.

== See also ==
- List of ship classes of the Second World War
