= Pauline Baines =

British book designer and typographer (1971–2020)

Pauline Baines (née Behr; 10 September 1917 – 10 November 2020) was a British book designer and typographer. She did war work for the Ministry of Information, and worked for Thames & Hudson in London.

Born in Hove into an observant Jewish family with origins in Lithuania, although in adulthood she did not consider herself part of Anglo-Jewry. She was the second child of Moses and Sonia Behr, both originally from Lithuania. The family moved to London and she grew up in Cricklewood. She first went to a small school in Hampstead, then to Brondesbury and Kilburn School for Girls when the family moved to Willesden Green. She wanted to attend university as her brothers had done but instead went to Willesden Art School (now part of College of North West London) and the Central School of Art (now Central Saint Martins), where she trained in illustration and graphic design.

She did war work in a factory and also as a Red Cross volunteer. Later she worked for the Ministry of Information, which was in charge of publicity and propaganda. In preparation for the 1951 Festival of Britain, she developed displays for the exhibition ship HMS Campania. From 1958 until her retirement she worked for Thames & Hudson, the London-based book publishers, where she was responsible for books such as the catalogue raisonné of the French artist Honoré Daumier.

In 1952, she married Harry Baines (1910–1995), a Realist painter and muralist from Manchester. At the beginning of their married life, the couple and a group of their friends formed a co-operative housing society and commissioned Ernő Goldfinger to design a small block of flats for them. The building on the Regent's Park Road, which draws on the architect's own Hampstead home 2 Willow Road, was Grade II listed in 1998.

For the rest of their lives the Baines lived at this address in inner London, between Camden Town and Primrose Hill. The couple traveled extensively, particularly in India and Italy. She was a committee member both for her neighbourhood association and for the local Labour Party. She outlived her husband by 25 years but never remarried. She died in London, aged 103.
