= German submarine U-288 =

German World War II submarine

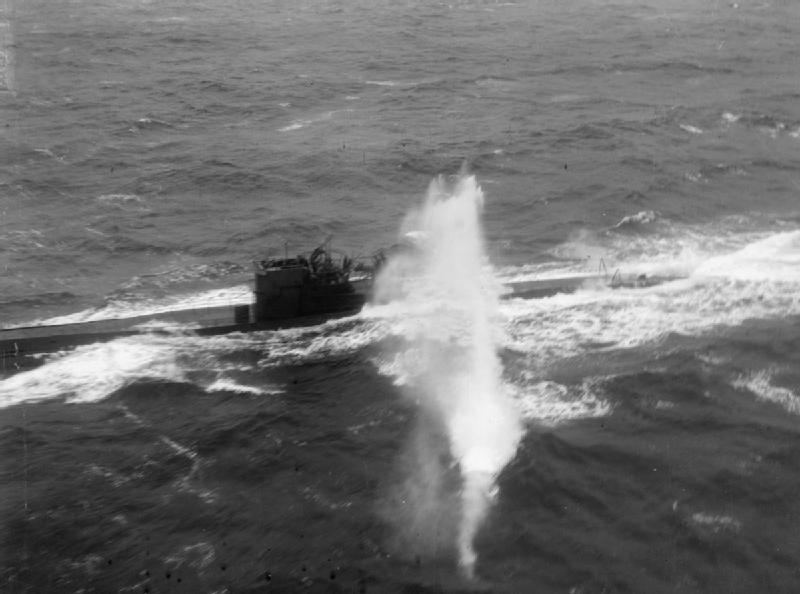
- A machine gun attack on U-288 by an Avenger aircraft on 3 April 1944

History

Nazi Germany
- Name: U-288
- Ordered: 5 June 1941
- Builder: Bremer Vulkan, Bremen-Vegesack
- Yard number: 53
- Laid down: 7 September 1942
- Launched: 15 May 1943
- Commissioned: 26 June 1943
- Fate: Sunk on 3 April 1944

General characteristics
- Class & type: Type VIIC submarine
- Displacement: 769 tonnes (757 long tons) surfaced; 871 t (857 long tons) submerged
- Length: 67.10 m (220 ft 2 in) o/a; 50.50 m (165 ft 8 in) pressure hull
- Beam: 6.20 m (20 ft 4 in) o/a; 4.70 m (15 ft 5 in) pressure hull
- Height: 9.60 m (31 ft 6 in)
- Draught: 4.74 m (15 ft 7 in)
- Installed power: 2,800–3,200 PS (2,100–2,400 kW; 2,800–3,200 bhp) (diesels); 750 PS (550 kW; 740 shp) (electric)
- Propulsion: 2 shafts; 2 × diesel engines; 2 × electric motors
- Speed: 17.7 knots (32.8 km/h; 20.4 mph) surfaced; 7.6 knots (14.1 km/h; 8.7 mph) submerged
- Range: 8,500 nmi (15,700 km; 9,800 mi) at 10 knots (19 km/h; 12 mph) surfaced; 80 nmi (150 km; 92 mi) at 4 knots (7.4 km/h; 4.6 mph) submerged
- Test depth: 230 m (750 ft); Crush depth: 250–295 m (820–968 ft)
- Complement: 4 officers, 40–56 enlisted
- Armament: 5 × 53.3 cm (21 in) torpedo tubes (four bow, one stern); 14 × torpedoes or 26 TMA mines; 1 × 8.8 cm (3.46 in) deck gun (220 rounds); 2 × twin 2 cm (0.79 in) C/30 anti-aircraft guns

Service record
- Part of: 8th U-boat Flotilla; 26 June 1943 – 31 January 1944; 13th U-boat Flotilla; 1 February – 3 April 1944
- Identification codes: M 44 937
- Commanders: Oblt.z.S. Willy Meyer; 26 June 1943 – 3 April 1944
- Operations: 2 patrols: 1st patrol: 26 February – 11 March 1944; 2nd patrol: 23 March – 3 April 1944
- Victories: None

German submarine U-288 was a Type VIIC U-boat of Nazi Germany's Kriegsmarine during World War II.

The submarine was laid down on 7 September 1942 at the Bremer Vulkan yard at Bremen-Vegesack as yard number 53. She was launched on 15 May 1943 and commissioned on 26 June under the command of Oberleutnant zur See Willy Meyer.

She did not sink or damage any ships.

She was sunk by British aircraft of the Fleet Air Arm from two escort carriers on 3 April 1944.

== Design ==
German Type VIIC submarines were preceded by the shorter Type VIIB submarines. U-288 had a displacement of 769 tonnes (757 long tons) when at the surface and 871 tonnes (857 long tons) while submerged. She had a total length of 67.10 m (220 ft 2 in), a pressure hull length of 50.50 m (165 ft 8 in), a beam of 6.20 m (20 ft 4 in), a height of 9.60 m (31 ft 6 in), and a draught of 4.74 m (15 ft 7 in). The submarine was powered by two Germaniawerft F46 four-stroke, six-cylinder supercharged diesel engines producing a total of 2,800 to 3,200 metric horsepower (2,060 to 2,350 kW; 2,760 to 3,160 shp) for use while surfaced, two AEG GU 460/8–27 double-acting electric motors producing a total of 750 metric horsepower (550 kW; 740 shp) for use while submerged. She had two shafts and two 1.23 m (4 ft) propellers. The boat was capable of operating at depths of up to 230 metres (750 ft).

The submarine had a maximum surface speed of 17.7 knots (32.8 km/h; 20.4 mph) and a maximum submerged speed of 7.6 knots (14.1 km/h; 8.7 mph). When submerged, the boat could operate for 80 nautical miles (150 km; 92 mi) at 4 knots (7.4 km/h; 4.6 mph); when surfaced, she could travel 8,500 nautical miles (15,700 km; 9,800 mi) at 10 knots (19 km/h; 12 mph). U-288 was fitted with five 53.3 cm (21 in) torpedo tubes (four fitted at the bow and one at the stern), fourteen torpedoes, one 8.8 cm (3.46 in) SK C/35 naval gun, 220 rounds, and two twin 2 cm (0.79 in) C/30 anti-aircraft guns. The boat had a complement of between forty-four and sixty.

== Service history ==
U-288 served with the 8th U-boat Flotilla for training from June 1943 to January 1944 and operationally with the 13th flotilla from 1 February.

=== First patrol ===
The boat's initial foray began with her departure from Kiel on 26 February 1944 for the Norwegian Sea and finished at Narvik on 11 March.

=== Second patrol and loss ===
She departed from Narvik on 23 March 1944. On 3 April she attacked Convoy JW 58 but was sunk by rockets and depth charges from a Fairey Swordfish of 819 Naval Air Squadron and a TBM Avenger and a Martlet, both of 846 squadron. The Swordfish had come from HMS Activity, the Avenger and the Martlet had been launched from HMS Tracker.

Forty-nine men died; there were no survivors.

=== Wolfpacks ===
U-288 took part in four wolfpacks, namely:

- Boreas (2 – 5 March 1944)
- Orkan (5 – 10 March 1944)
- Blitz (24 – 30 March 1944)
- Hammer (30 March – 3 April 1944)

== Bibliography ==
- Busch, Rainer; Röll, Hans-Joachim (1999). German U-boat commanders of World War II : a biographical dictionary. Translated by Brooks, Geoffrey. London, Annapolis, Md: Greenhill Books, Naval Institute Press. ISBN 1-55750-186-6.
- Busch, Rainer; Röll, Hans-Joachim (1999). Deutsche U-Boot-Verluste von September 1939 bis Mai 1945 [German U-boat losses from September 1939 to May 1945]. Der U-Boot-Krieg (in German). Vol. IV. Hamburg, Berlin, Bonn: Mittler. ISBN 3-8132-0514-2.
- Gröner, Erich; Jung, Dieter; Maass, Martin (1991). U-boats and Mine Warfare Vessels. German Warships 1815–1945. Vol. 2. Translated by Thomas, Keith; Magowan, Rachel. London: Conway Maritime Press. ISBN 0-85177-593-4.
