= HMS Campania (D48) =

1944 Nairana-class escort carrier of the Royal Navy

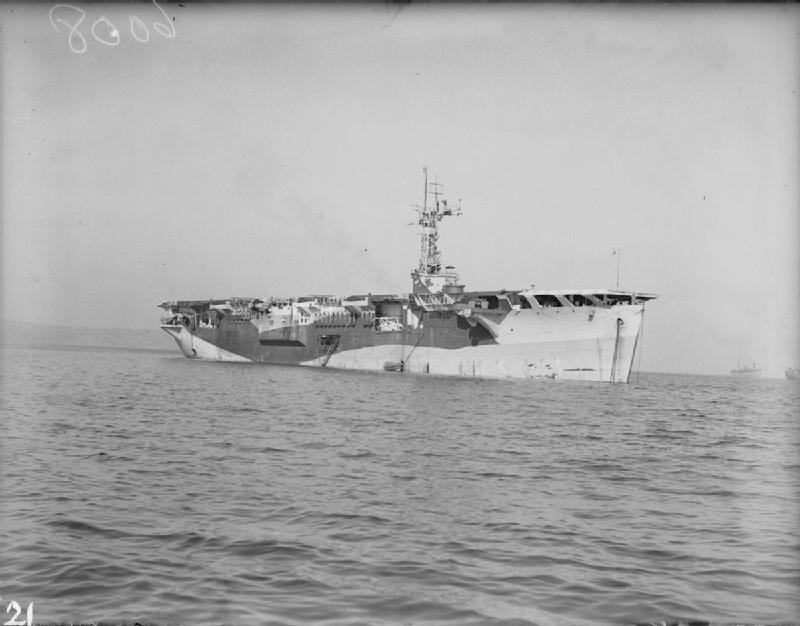
- HMS Campania

History

United Kingdom
- Name: Campania
- Builder: Harland & Wolff
- Yard number: 1091
- Laid down: 12 August 1941
- Launched: 17 June 1943
- Completed: 7 March 1944
- Commissioned: 9 February 1944
- Decommissioned: 30 December 1945
- Commissioned: June 1952
- Decommissioned: December 1952
- Identification: Pennant number: D48
- Fate: Scrapped 1955

General characteristics
- Class & type: Nairana-class escort carrier
- Displacement: 13,000 tons standard, 15,970 tons loaded
- Length: 540 ft (160 m)
- Beam: 70 ft (21 m)
- Draught: 22.8 ft (6.9 m)
- Propulsion: Two shafted diesel engines, 13,250 shp
- Speed: 18 knots (33 km/h)
- Range: 17,000 nautical miles (31,000 km) at 17 knots (31 km/h)
- Complement: 639
- Armament: 2 × 4 inch guns; 16 × 2-pounderguns (4×4); 16 × 20 mm guns (8×2)
- Aircraft carried: 18

HMS Campania was an escort aircraft carrier of the Royal Navy that saw service during the Second World War. After the war, the ship was used as a floating exhibition hall for the 1951 Festival of Britain and as the command ship for the 1952 Operation Hurricane, the test of the prototype British atomic bomb.

She was built at Harland & Wolff shipyards in Belfast, Northern Ireland. When construction started in 1941 she was intended as a refrigerated cargo ship for transporting lamb and mutton from New Zealand, but was requisitioned by the British Government during construction and completed and launched as an escort carrier, entering service in early 1944.

The ship was of a similar, but not identical design to the other ships of the Nairana class.

== Second World War ==
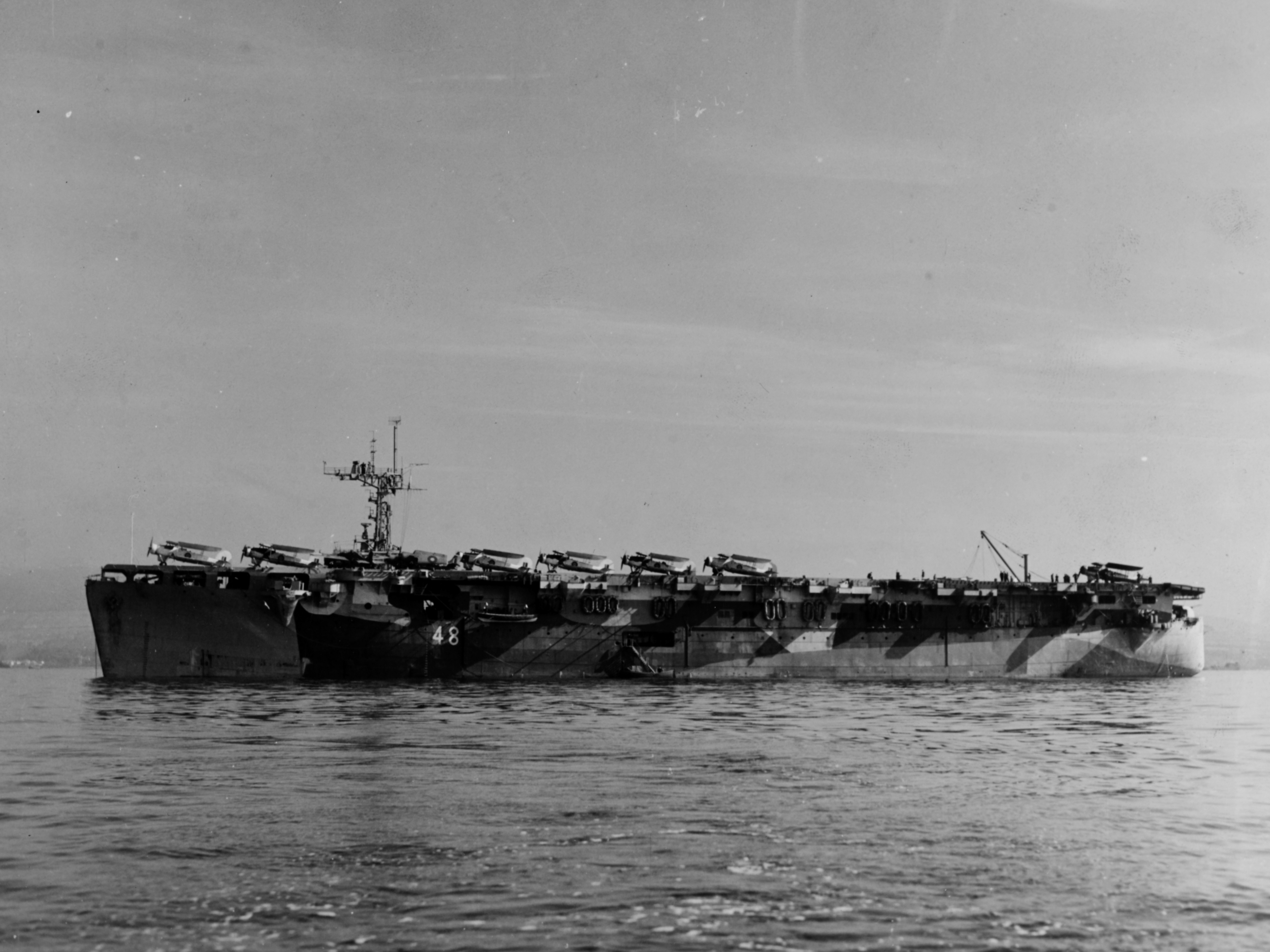
Campania in June 1944.

Campania operated escorting convoys and doing anti-submarine work in the Atlantic and Arctic theatres. In December 1944, her Swordfish aircraft from a detachment of 813 Squadron sank the German submarine U-365 while the Campania was escorting the Arctic convoy RA 62.

The ship survived the war, and unlike other Royal Navy escort carriers, was not immediately scrapped or sold. She was briefly used as an aircraft transport before being decommissioned and placed in reserve in December 1945.

== Festival of Britain ==
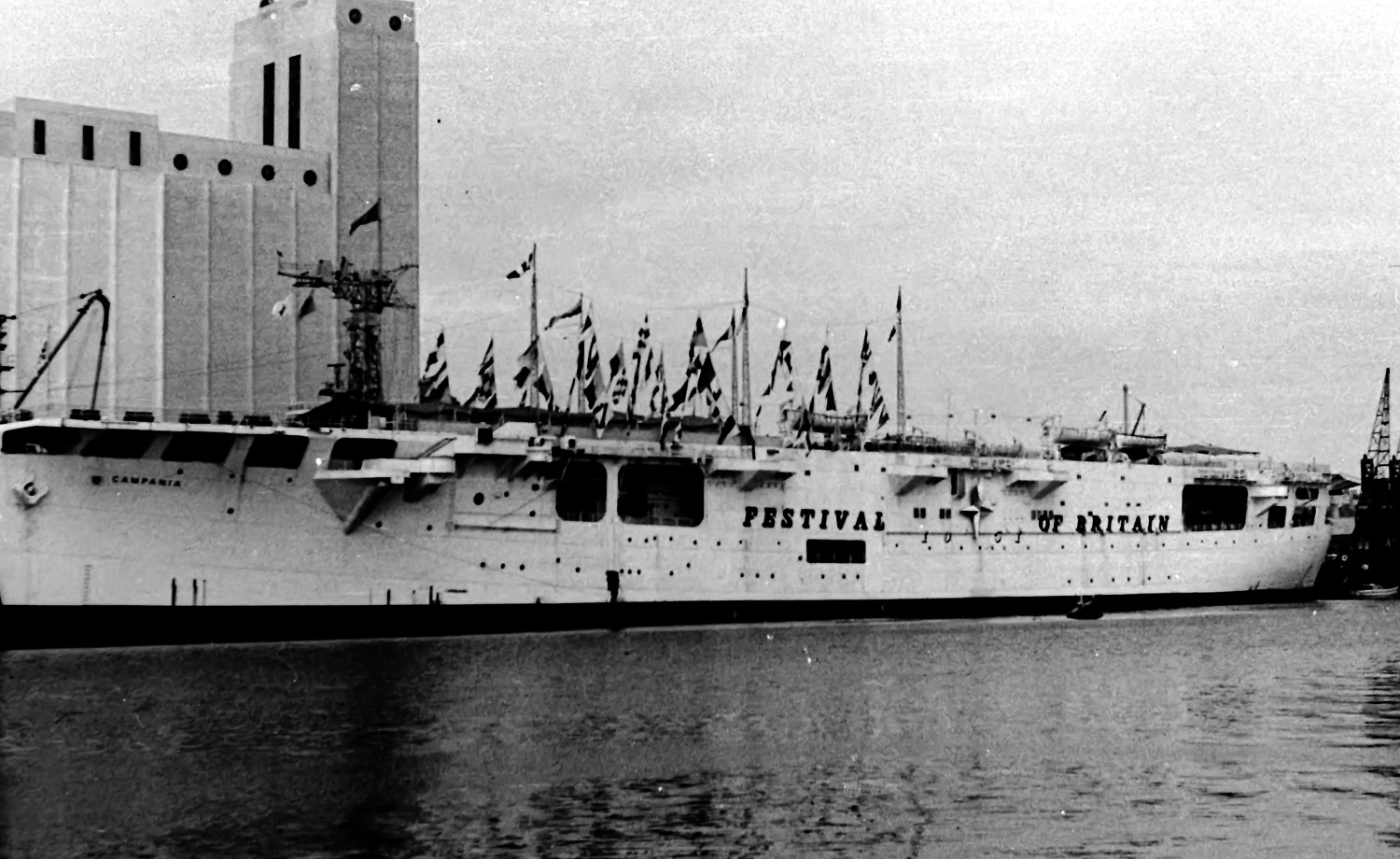
Campania in Festival Dress at Plymouth Docks.

In 1951, she was the Festival of Britain's exhibition ship, touring the country's ports with a civilian crew as the Festival Ship Campania to supplement the main exhibition in London and two thousand local events.

The Festival Office's resident designer, James Holland, considered that the vessel would "not convert easily into a showboat", but with the massive demand for shipping to help rebuild Europe after the war, he and his colleagues felt lucky to have any ship at all. One of the graphic designers who worked on the displays was Pauline Baines

Repainted white, the ship was decorated with skeleton masts and bunting. Officially named the Sea Travelling Exhibition, the exhibits were intended to reflect the main London Exhibition. Like the Festival's Land Travelling Exhibition, they were divided into three sections, the "Land of Britain", "Discovery" and "The People at Home". Between 4 May 1951 and 6 October, the ship visited Southampton, Dundee, Newcastle, Hull, Plymouth, Bristol, Cardiff, Belfast, Birkenhead and Glasgow, staying at each port for 10–14 days.

== Operation Hurricane ==
With the festival over, the ship was refitted in Birkenhead for a very different role, as the command ship for Operation Hurricane, the test of the first British atomic bomb on the Monte Bello Islands off western Australia. The refit saw the exhibition replaced by workshops, laboratories, offices and cabins, plus a desalination plant since the Monte Bello Islands did not have any indigenous fresh water source to supply the 1500 personnel who would take part in the test.

Four other ships were directly involved in the test, the landing ships Narvik, Zeebrugge, Tracker and the frigate, Plym. Tracker was designated as the health ship and extensively equipped with decontamination facilities, whilst the weapon was to be detonated aboard Plym. The flotilla was under the overall command of Rear Admiral Arthur David Torlesse.

Heavily laden with crated equipment and deck cargo, including three Westland Dragonfly helicopters and two Sea Otter aircraft and deck cargo, the re-commissioned Campania departed from Portsmouth for the islands on 2 June 1952. Eighty-five scientists were also on board as passengers, around half directly involved in British nuclear programme and the remainder from other parts of the British civil service.

The vessel arrived at the Monte Bello Islands on 8 August after calling into Gibraltar, Cape Town, Mauritius and Fremantle and the next two months were spent preparing for the test, which took place on 3 October. Campania was not found to be particularly suitable as the main base for the test, partly because it was hot and cramped, and partly because there were insufficient boats for ferrying them between the ship and the shore and the eight pinnaces intended to perform about a third of the work could not moor close to the ship at night because the water was too choppy. Most of the scientists and engineers soon moved to tented accommodation ashore.

The ship was decommissioned for the final time in December 1952 following her return to the United Kingdom, and sold and scrapped in Blyth in 1955.
