= HMS Activity =

1942 Escort carrier of the Royal Navy

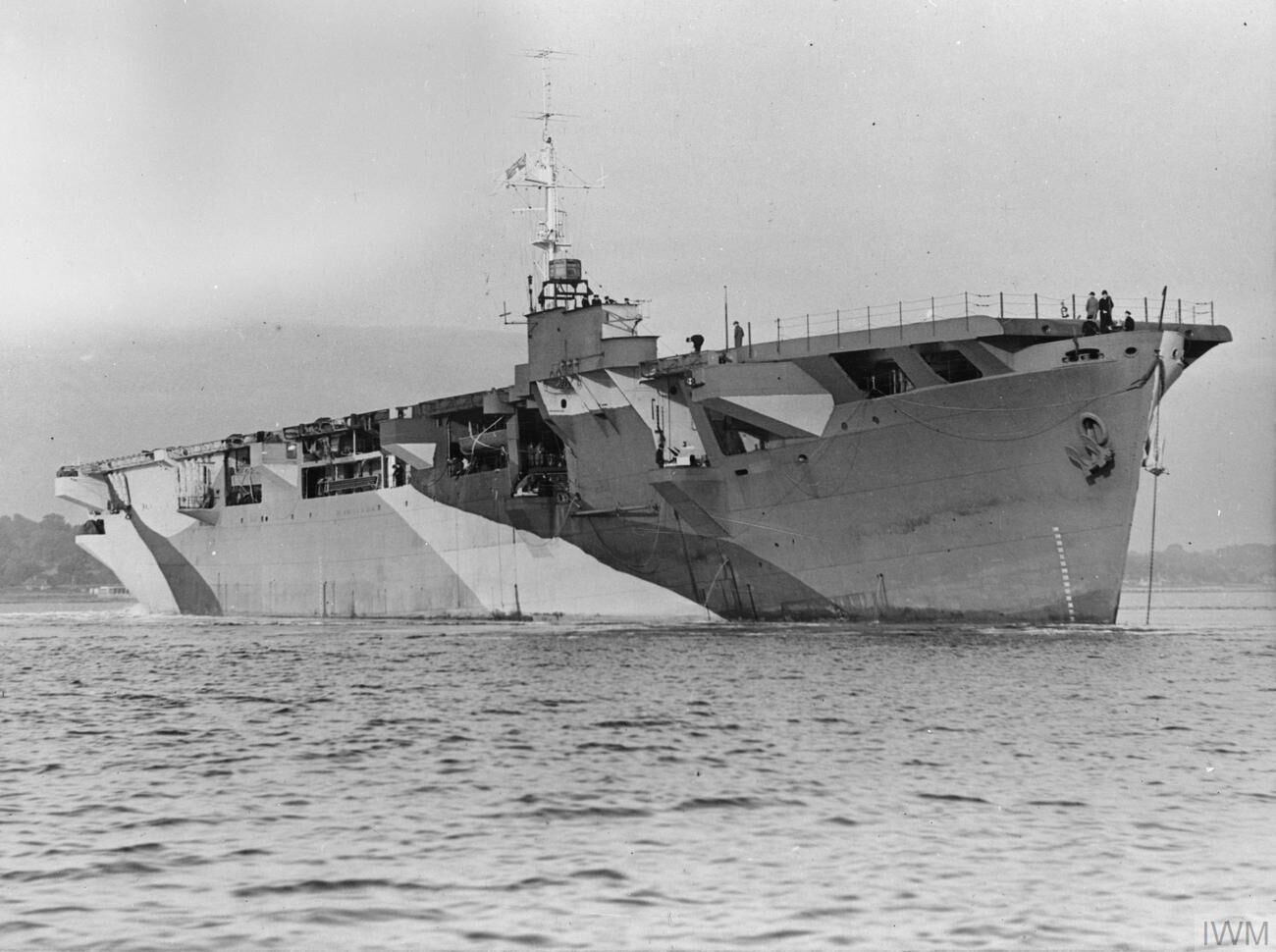
- HMS Activity underway in the Firth of Forth, October 1942.

History

United Kingdom
- Name: HMS Activity
- Builder: Caledon Shipbuilding & Engineering Company, Dundee
- Laid down: 1 February 1940
- Launched: 30 May 1942
- Commissioned: 29 September 1942
- Decommissioned: 20 October 1945
- Renamed: Empire Activity February 1941
- Honours and awards: Atlantic 1944, Arctic 1944-45
- Fate: Sold into merchant service as Breconshire, 25 March 1946

General characteristics
- Displacement: 14,250 long tons (14,479 t) fully loaded
- Length: 512 ft 9 in (156.29 m)
- Beam: 66 ft 6 in (20.27 m)
- Draught: 25 ft (7.6 m)
- Installed power: 12,000 hp (8,900 kW)
- Propulsion: 2 × diesel engines; 2 × screws
- Speed: 18 kn (21 mph; 33 km/h)
- Complement: 700
- Armament: 2 × 4 in (100 mm) guns; 20 × 20 mm (0.79 in) anti-aircraft autocannons
- Aircraft carried: 10
- Aviation facilities: 1 × lift, 42 ft × 20 ft (12.8 m × 6.1 m); 1 × catapult
- MV Breconshire, 1958

History

United Kingdom
- Name: Breconshire
- Port of registry: United Kingdom
- In service: September 1946
- Out of service: April 1967
- Fate: Sold for scrap, 24 April 1967

General characteristics
- Tonnage: 9,061 grt
- Length: 512 ft 8 in (156.26 m)
- Beam: 66 ft 4 in (20.22 m)
- Draught: Ship power=12,000 hp (8,900 kW)
- Propulsion: 2 × diesel engines; 2 × screws
- Speed: 18 kn (21 mph; 33 km/h)

HMS Activity was an escort carrier that served with the Royal Navy of the United Kingdom during the Second World War. After the war, she was sold into merchant service as the MV Breconshire, serving for over 20 years until scrapped in 1967.

== History ==
=== Royal Navy ===
HMS Activity was built at Caledon shipyards in Dundee. When construction started in 1940 she was intended to become the refrigerated cargo ship Telemachus for the Alfred Holt Line. In February 1941, she was taken over by the Ministry of War Transport and renamed Empire Activity. In January 1942, she was requisitioned by the Admiralty for conversion to an escort carrier, now named HMS Activity and carrying pennant number D94. Following her launch in May 1942 and completion in August of that year, Activity worked up at Lamlash before going to Rosyth for rectification of defects. Entering service on 1 January 1943, Activity operated as a deck landing training carrier until October 1943, when she was sent to Liverpool for a refit before entering active service.

After her refit, Activity took part in convoy escort duties in the North Atlantic. Activity embarked 819 Naval Air Squadron on 12 January 1944, and began escort duties on 29 January as part of the Second Escort Group. Activity was involved in the escort of convoys OS 66, KMS 40, ON 222, NS 28, SL 147, MKS 38, HX 277, KMS 43 and MKF 29 in the period to March 1944. Following this, Activity moved to the Arctic, escorting convoy JW 58 to Murmansk. Her aircraft—together with those from Tracker—were responsible for the sinking of U-boat U-288, and U-355, as well as damaging U-362, U-673 and U-990. The return convoy—RA 58—reached its destination without loss.

In May 1944, Activity spent some time at a shipyard on the Clyde for defect rectification before rejoining the Second Escort Group for escort duties. Activity escorted convoys OS 78, KMS 52, SL 158, MKS 49, OS 78, KMS 52, AL 159, MKS 50, SL 162, MK 53, KMF 33, MKF 33, OS 86, KMS 60, SL 167 and MKS 58.

In August 1944, Activity was designated as a ferry carrier. She transported aircraft, personnel and supplies to Trincomalee, Ceylon, arriving on 23 October 1944 and returning via Gibraltar, where she joined convoy MKF 36 back to the United Kingdom. Activity spent some time in a Clyde shipyard in December 1944 for defect rectification, after which she was reallocated to the East Indies Fleet and given a new pennant number, R301. She sailed with convoy KM 39 on 29 January 1945, arriving in Colombo on 20 February. Whilst en route to Sydney, Activity rescued the 92 survivors from SS Peter Silvester, an American liberty ship which had been sunk by U-862 on 6 February 1945, the last Allied ship sunk by enemy action in the Indian Ocean. Survivors from Peter Silvester were landed at Fremantle and Activity then continued her journey to Sydney.

Activity departed Sydney on 24 March, bound for Colombo for duty ferrying aircraft from Cochin to Colombo. After the end of the war, Activity was sent to Singapore to support the reoccupation of Singapore. She loaded ex-POWs and other passengers and sailed for Trincomalee on 15 September. Activity arrived home on the Clyde on 20 October 1945, and was then de-stored and placed in the Reserve Fleet. She was placed in the Category B Reserve on 30 January 1946, and sold to Glen Lines on 25 March 1946 for conversion to a merchant ship.

=== Merchant Navy ===
Activity was converted to a Glenearn class merchant ship by Palmers of Hebburn-on-Tyne, and renamed Breconshire, entering service with Glen Line in September 1947. She was the second Glen Line ship to be named Breconshire. She measured 9,061 gross register tons. She remained in service until April 1967, sailing from Kobe to Mihara for scrapping, arriving there on 24 April 1967.

== See also ==
- List of escort aircraft carriers of the Royal Navy
