= HMS Tracker (D24) =

1943 Attacker-class escort aircraft carrier

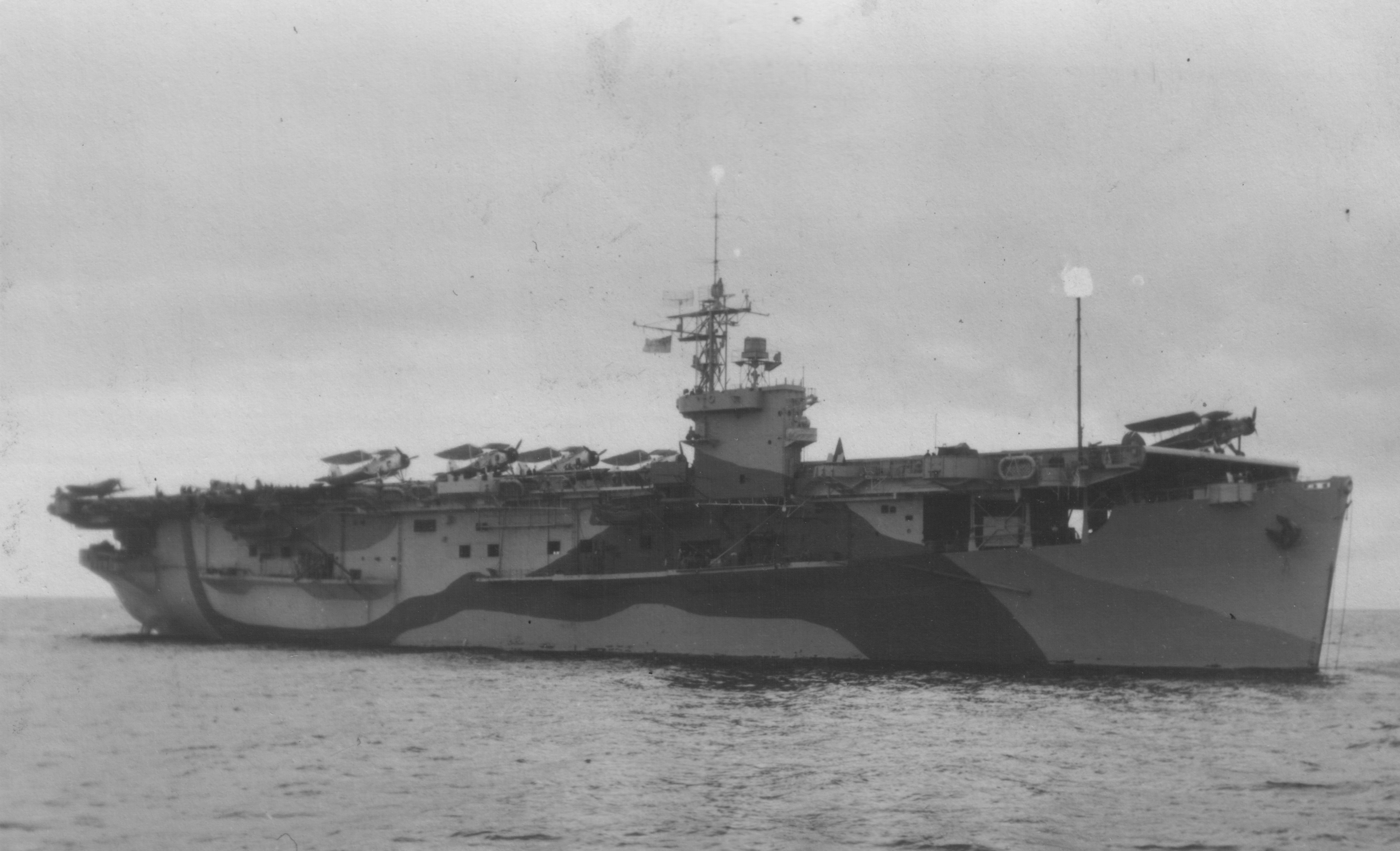
- Tracker in circa 1944 - note the Swordfish with folded wings; a solitary aircraft, probably a Seafire, is at the rear of the flight deck

History

United Kingdom
- Name: Tracker
- Ordered: as a Type C3-S-A1 hull, MCE hull 233
- Awarded: 5 October 1941
- Builder: Seattle-Tacoma Shipbuilding Corporation, Tacoma, Washington
- Cost: $17,748,185
- Yard number: 17
- Way number: 4
- Laid down: 3 November 1941
- Launched: 7 March 1942
- Commissioned: 31 January 1943
- Decommissioned: 2 November 1946
- Identification: Pennant number: D24
- Fate: Returned to US Navy, 29 November 1945

United States
- Name: Tracker
- Stricken: 21 January 1946
- Fate: Sold into merchant service, renamed Corrientes, scrapped, 24 September 1964

General characteristics
- Class & type: Attacker-class escort carrier
- Displacement: 10,200 long tons (10,360 t) (standard); 14,400 long tons (14,630 t) (full load)
- Length: 465 ft (142 m) (wl); 496 ft (151 m) (oa); 440 ft (130 m) (fd)
- Beam: 69 ft 6 in (21.18 m) wl; 82 ft (25 m) (fd); 111 ft 6 in (33.99 m) (extreme width)
- Draught: 23 ft 3 in (7.09 m) (mean); 26 ft (7.9 m) (deep load)
- Installed power: 2 × Foster-Wheeler 285 psi (1,970 kPa) boilers; 8,500 shp (6,300 kW)
- Propulsion: 1 × General Electric or Westinghouse steam turbine; 1 × Screw
- Speed: 18 kn (33 km/h; 21 mph)
- Complement: 646 officers and ratings
- Armament: 2 × 4 in (102 mm)/50 cal guns; 4 × twin 40 mm (1.57 in) Bofors guns; 8 × twin 20 mm (0.79 in) Oerlikon cannons; 10 × single Oerlikon cannons
- Aircraft carried: 16-21
- Aviation facilities: 1 × hydraulic catapult; 2 × elevators

Service record
- Operations: Battle of the Atlantic, Normandy Landings
- Victories: Sank U-288

HMS Tracker (BACV-6/D24) was an Attacker-class escort carrier that was built in the United States, but served in the Royal Navy during World War II.

== Design and description ==
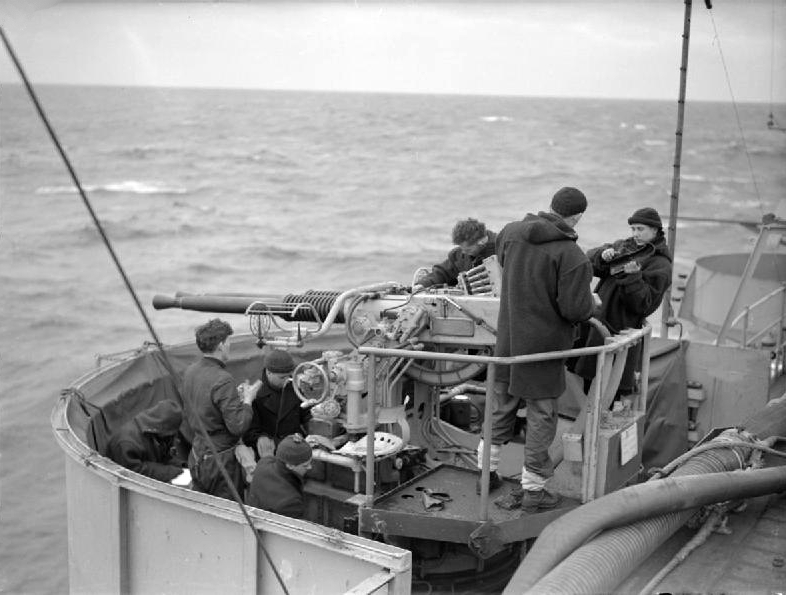
A twin 40 mm Bofors anti-aircraft gun; such weapons were mounted on Tracker

All the ships had a complement of 646 men and an overall length of 495 feet 8 inches (151.1 m), a beam of 69 feet 6 inches (21.2 m) and a draught of 24 ft 8 in (7.5 m). Propulsion was provided by two boilers connected to a steam turbine, which drove one shaft giving 8,500 shaft horsepower (6,300 kW). This arrangement could propel the ship at 18 knots (33 km/h; 21 mph).

Aircraft facilities were a small combined bridge/flight control on the starboard side, two aircraft lifts 43 by 34 feet (13.1 m × 10.4 m), one aircraft catapult and nine arrestor wires. Aircraft could be housed in the 260 by 62 feet (79.2 m × 18.9 m) hangar below the flight deck. Armament comprised: two 4"/50, 5"/38 or 5"/51 Dual Purpose guns in single mounts, sixteen 40 mm Bofors anti-aircraft guns in twin mounts and twenty 20 mm Oerlikon anti-aircraft cannons in single mounts. The ships had a maximum aircraft capacity of twenty-four which could be a mixture of Grumman Martlets, Vought F4U Corsairs or Hawker Sea Hurricane fighter aircraft and Fairey Swordfish or Grumman Avenger anti-submarine torpedo bombers.

== History ==
Tracker was laid down 3 November 1941, under a Maritime Commission (MARCOM) contract, MC hull 233, by Seattle-Tacoma Shipbuilding in Tacoma, Washington. She was originally intended to be the 2nd replacement merchant ship Mormacmail for Moore-McCormack Lines, Inc., however, before completion, the vessel was purchased by the US Navy. In 1942, she was given the designation BACV-6 and converted into an escort carrier at Willamette Iron & Steel, Portland, Oregon. She was launched on 7 March 1942, and commissioned 31 January 1943; she was transferred to the Royal Navy and renamed HMS Tracker.

Tracker served as an escort during 1943–1944, for North Atlantic and Arctic convoys. She originally carried Swordfish torpedo-bombers and Seafire fighters of 816 Naval Air Squadron; in January 1944, switching to the Grumman Avengers and Grumman Wildcats of 846 Naval Air Squadron. In April 1944, her aircraft, together with those from HMS Activity were responsible for the sinking of the German U-boat U-288 east of Bear Island, during convoy JW 58.

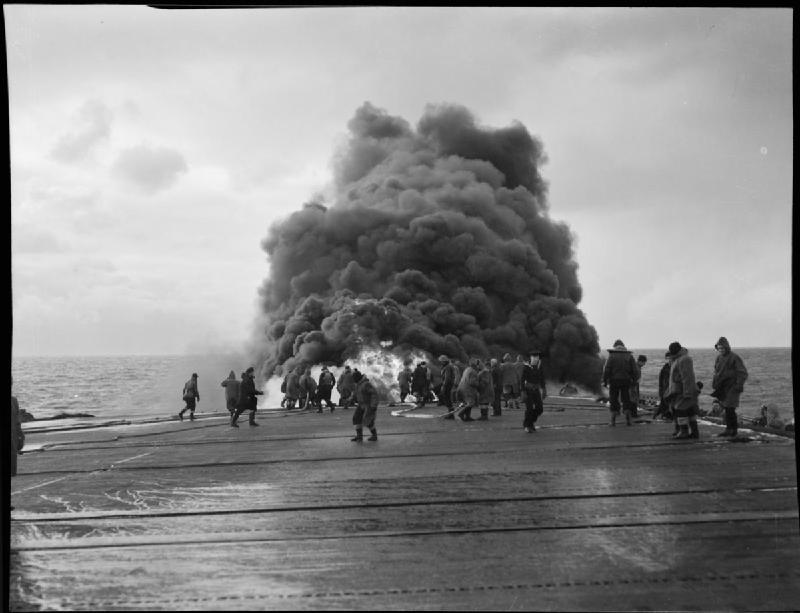
Black smoke rises after a Grumman Avenger crashes on the flight deck of Tracker whilst on Russian convoy duty

On 10 June 1944, while part of the antisubmarine screen of the Western Approaches Command for the D-Day landings, she collided with a River-class frigate of the Royal Canadian Navy, HMCS Teme, causing damage to both ships. HMS Tracker continued operations despite stove-in bows until 12 June 1944. Thereafter, she was repaired and partially refitted in Liverpool, until 7 September 1944. On 8 December 1944, the ship sailed to the US to be used as an aircraft transport, and spent the remainder of the war ferrying aircraft and personnel in the Pacific.

In August 1945, she made a final trip to the UK, being returned to the US Navy in November 1945. She was sold in November 1946, and entered service as the merchant ship Corrientes, based in Argentina. She was scrapped in 1964.

=== Battle honours ===
- 1943 - 44 Atlantic
- 1944 Arctic
- 1944 Normandy
